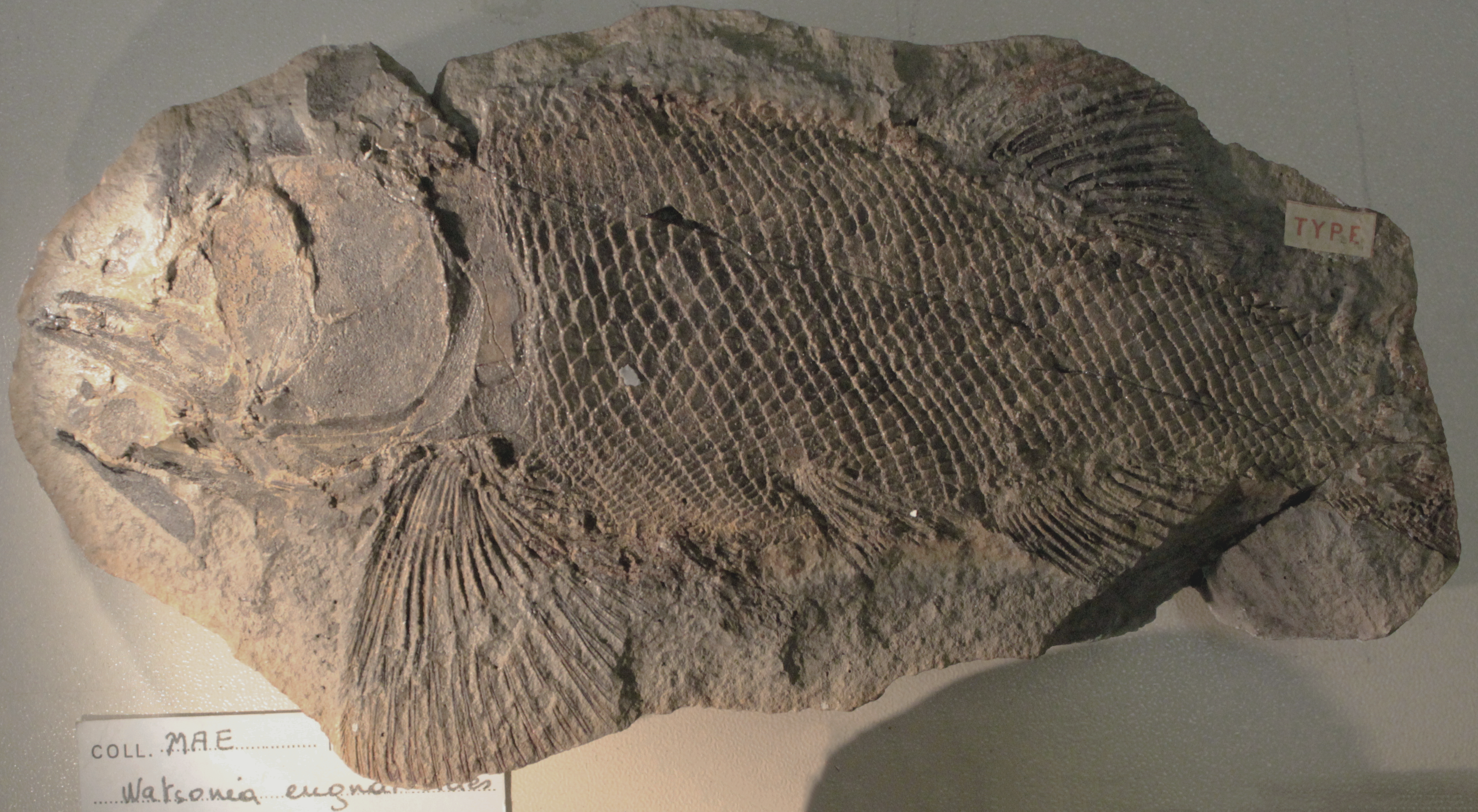
- Watsonulus eugnathoides type

Scientific classification
- Kingdom: Animalia
- Phylum: Chordata
- Class: Actinopterygii
- Order: †Parasemionotiformes
- Family: †Parasemionotidae
- Genus: †Watsonulus; Brough, 1939
- Species: †W. eugnathoides

Binomial name
- †Watsonulus eugnathoides (Piveteau, 1934)

Synonyms
- Watsonia Piveteau, 1934 (non Watsonia de Folin, 1880)

= Watsonulus =

Watsonulus Temporal range: Induan

Extinct genus of fishes

Watsonulus is an extinct genus of prehistoric ray-finned fish that lived during the Early Triassic epoch in what is now Madagascar. It may have also existed in what is now Himachal Pradesh, India, during the Induan age (Early Triassic). The type species, described by Jean Piveteau, is Watsonia eugnathoides. Because "Watsonia" was preoccupied, the new genus name Watsonulus was later erected. The genus is named after David Meredith Seares Watson.

== Classification ==
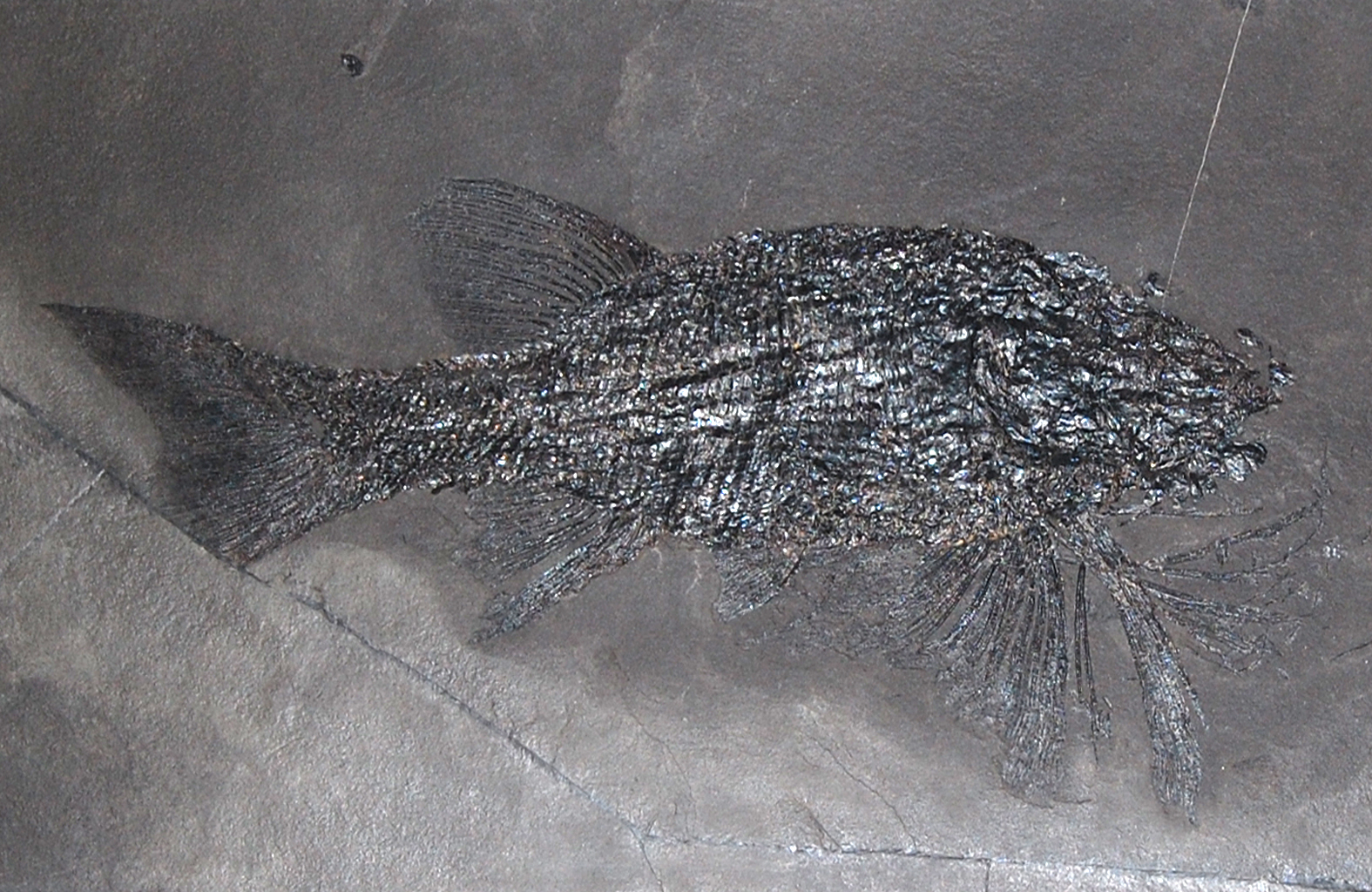
Albertonia cupidinia also had large pectoral fins

Watsonulus belongs to Parasemionotidae, a family of early neopterygians closely related with halecomorphs. Other members of Parasemionotidae include Albertonia, Candelarialepis, Icarealcyon, Jacobulus, Lehmanotus, Parasemionotus, Qingshania, Stensioenotus, Suius, and Thomasinotus.

Similar to Albertonia (Early Triassic of Canada) and Icarealcyon, the pectoral fins of Watsonulus were fairly large.

== See also ==
- Prehistoric fish
- List of prehistoric bony fish
