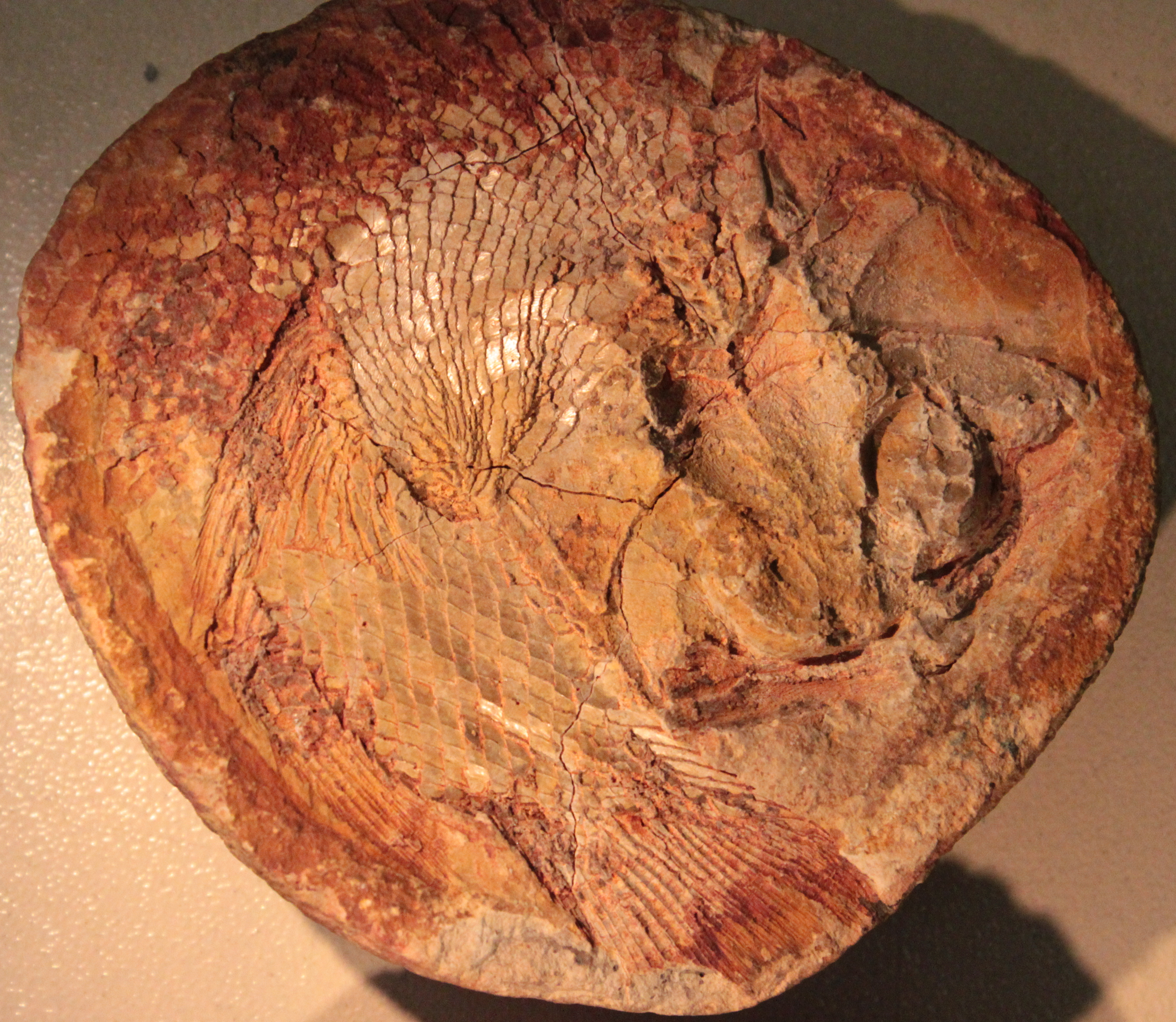
- Thomasinotus sp. fossil

Scientific classification
- Kingdom: Animalia
- Phylum: Chordata
- Class: Actinopterygii
- Order: †Parasemionotiformes
- Family: †Parasemionotidae
- Genus: †Thomasinotus; Lehman, 1952
- Species: †T. divisus

Binomial name
- †Thomasinotus divisus Lehman, 1952

= Thomasinotus =

Thomasinotus Temporal range: Induan

Extinct genus of fish

Thomasinotus is an extinct genus of small prehistoric ray-finned fish that lived in the Induan age of the Early Triassic epoch in what is now Madagascar. It belongs to the early neopterygian family Parasemionotidae together with Albertonia, Candelarialepis, Icarealcyon, Jacobulus, Lehmanotus, Parasemionotus, Qingshania, Stensioenotus, Suius, and Watsonulus.

== See also ==
- Prehistoric fish
- List of prehistoric bony fish
