= Stensionotus =

Stensionotus Temporal range: Early Triassic

Scientific classification
- Domain: Eukaryota
- Kingdom: Animalia
- Phylum: Chordata
- Class: Actinopterygii
- Order: †Parasemionotiformes
- Family: †Parasemionotidae
- Genus: †Stensionotus; Lehman, 1952

Type species
- †Stensionotus intercessus Lehman, 1952

Species
- †S. intercessus; †S. dongchangensis

Extinct genus of fishes

Stensionotus is an extinct genus of prehistoric bony fish that lived during the Early Triassic epoch in what is now Madagascar and China. It belongs to Parasemionotidae together with Albertonia, Candelarialepis, Jacobulus, Lehmanotus, Parasemionotus, Qingshania, Suius, Thomasinotus and Watsonulus. It is named after Erik Stensiö.

== See also ==
- Prehistoric fish
- List of prehistoric bony fish
