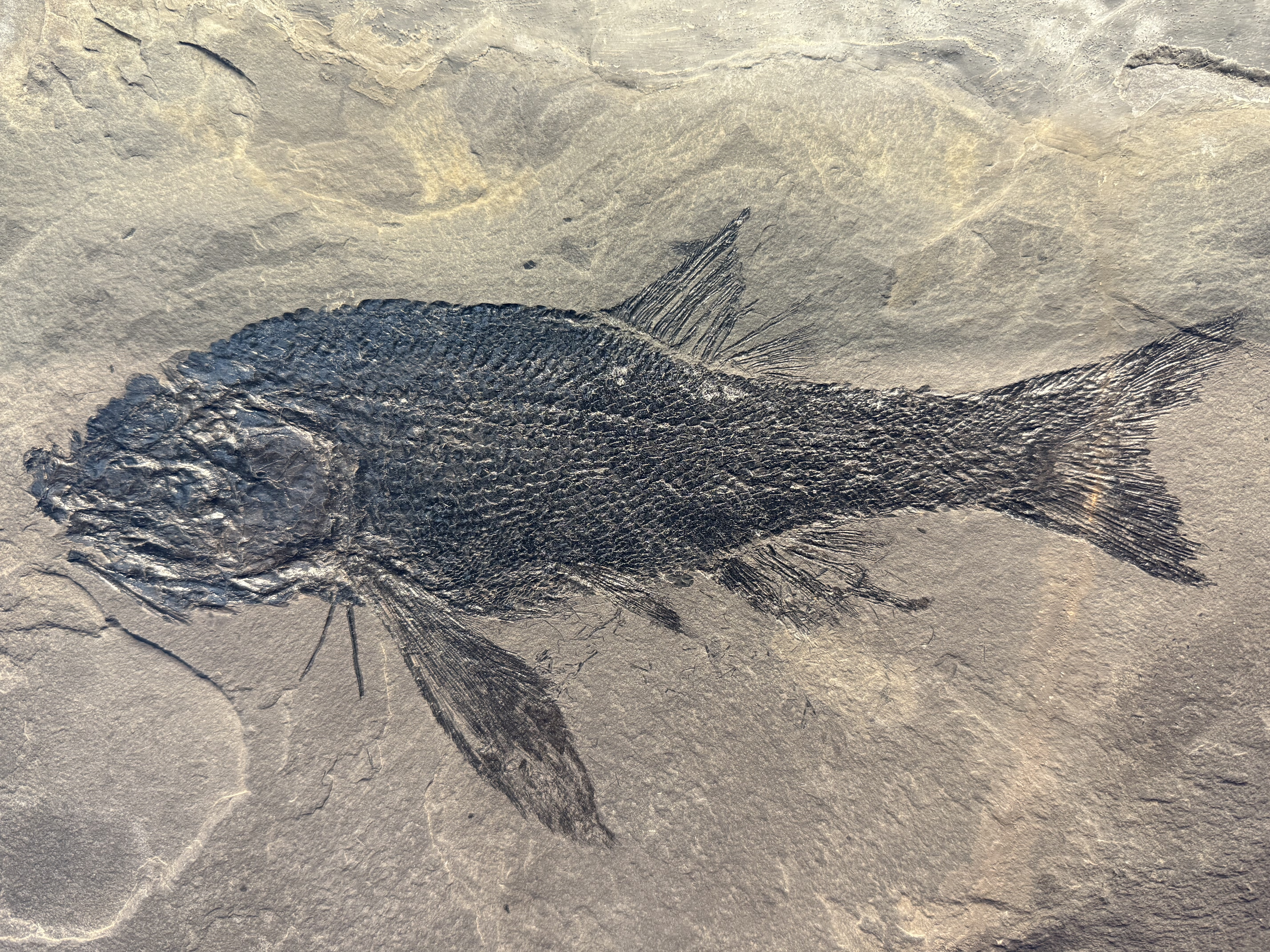
- Albertonia cupidinia

Scientific classification
- Kingdom: Animalia
- Phylum: Chordata
- Class: Actinopterygii
- Infraclass: Holostei
- Order: †Parasemionotiformes; Lehman, 1966

Families
- †Parasemionotidae Stensiö, 1932; †Promecosominidae Wade, 1940

= Parasemionotiformes =

Parasemionotiformes Temporal range: Induan-Anisian

Extinct order of ray-finned fishes

Parasemionotiformes is an extinct order of neopterygian ray-finned fish that existed globally during the Triassic period. It comprises the families Parasemionotidae and Promecosominidae. Many of the included genera are monotypic and most species lived during the Early Triassic epoch.

Parasemionotiforms were normally small to medium-sized fishes. They were predominantly marine.

== Evolutionary relationships ==
Parasemionotiformes are neopterygians, which is the clade that encompasses the vast majority of living ray-finned fishes (Actinopterygii) and about half of all living species of vertebrates. Neopterygii are divided into Teleostei and Holostei. The latter represents a depauperate group today but used to be a diverse clade especially during the Mesozoic Era. The only surviving members of the Holostei are the gars (Ginglymodi) and the bowfin (Halecomorphi).

Parasemionotiformes belong to Holostei and are one of the earliest clades of the Halecomorphi (bowfin and its extinct relatives). Parasemionotiformes are the sister group to all other halecomorphs according to cladistic analyses.

The following tree summarizes the evolutionary relationships of the Parasemionotiformes. Names accompanied by a dagger (†) represent extinct groups.

- Neopterygii
  - Teleostei
  - Holostei
    - Ginglymodi (gars and their extinct relatives)
    - Halecomorphi
      - †Parasemionotiformes
      - - †Panxianichthyiformes
        - - †Ionoscopiformes
          - Amiiformes (bowfin and its fossil relatives)

== Classification ==
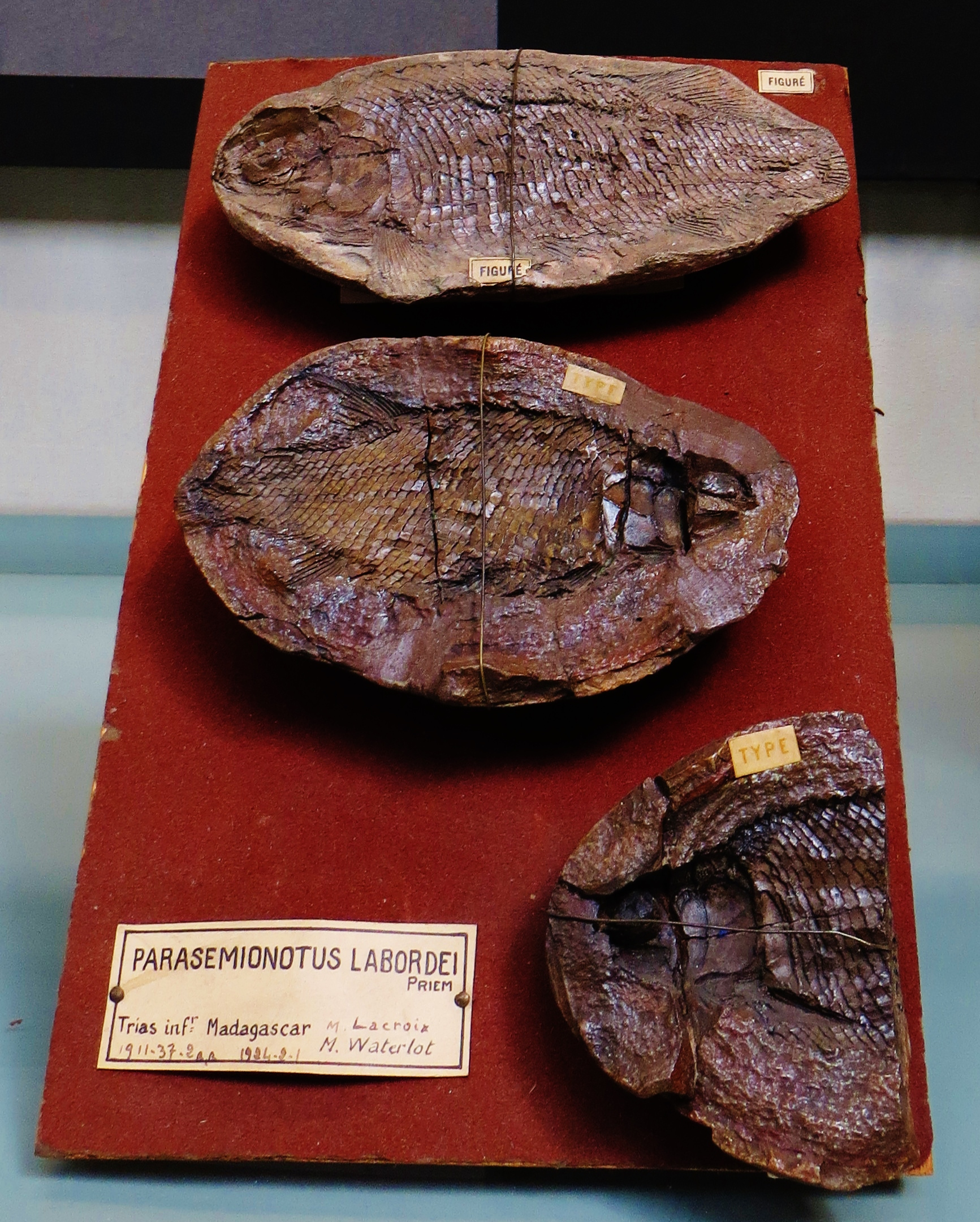
Parasemionotus labordei was the first described parasemionotiform

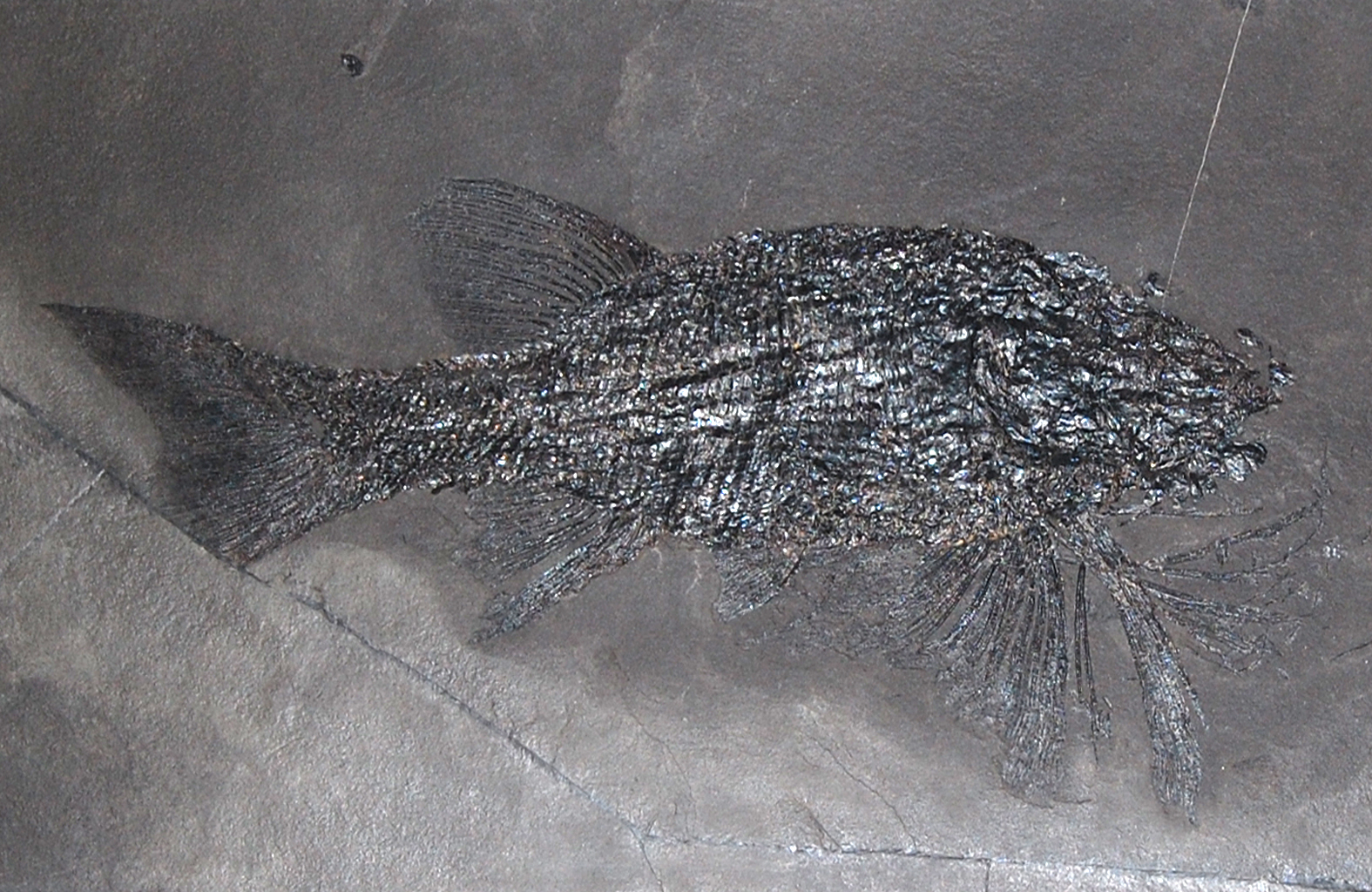
Albertonia cupidinia from the Early Triassic of Canada had large pectoral fins

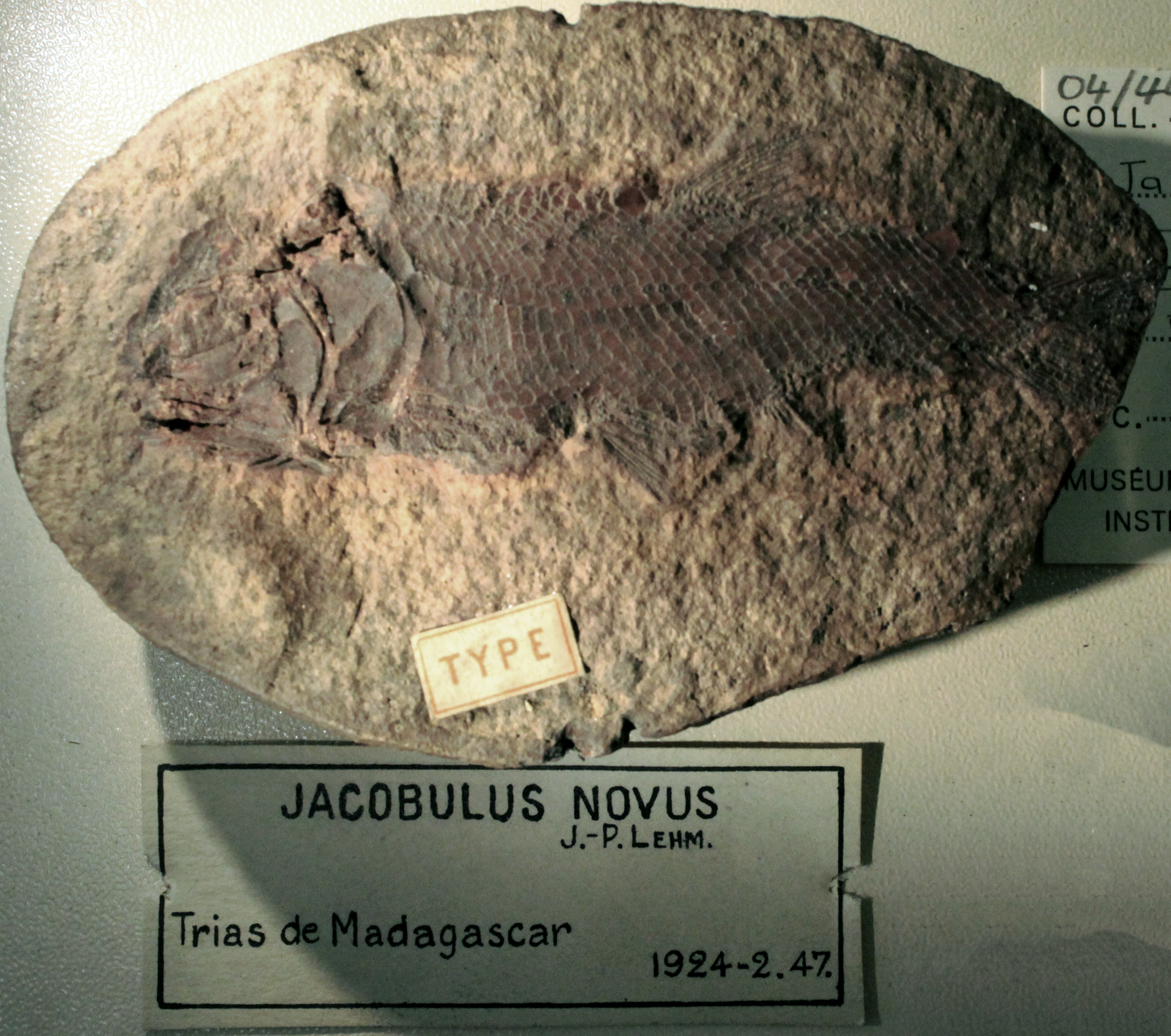
Jacobulus novus was a small parasemionotiform

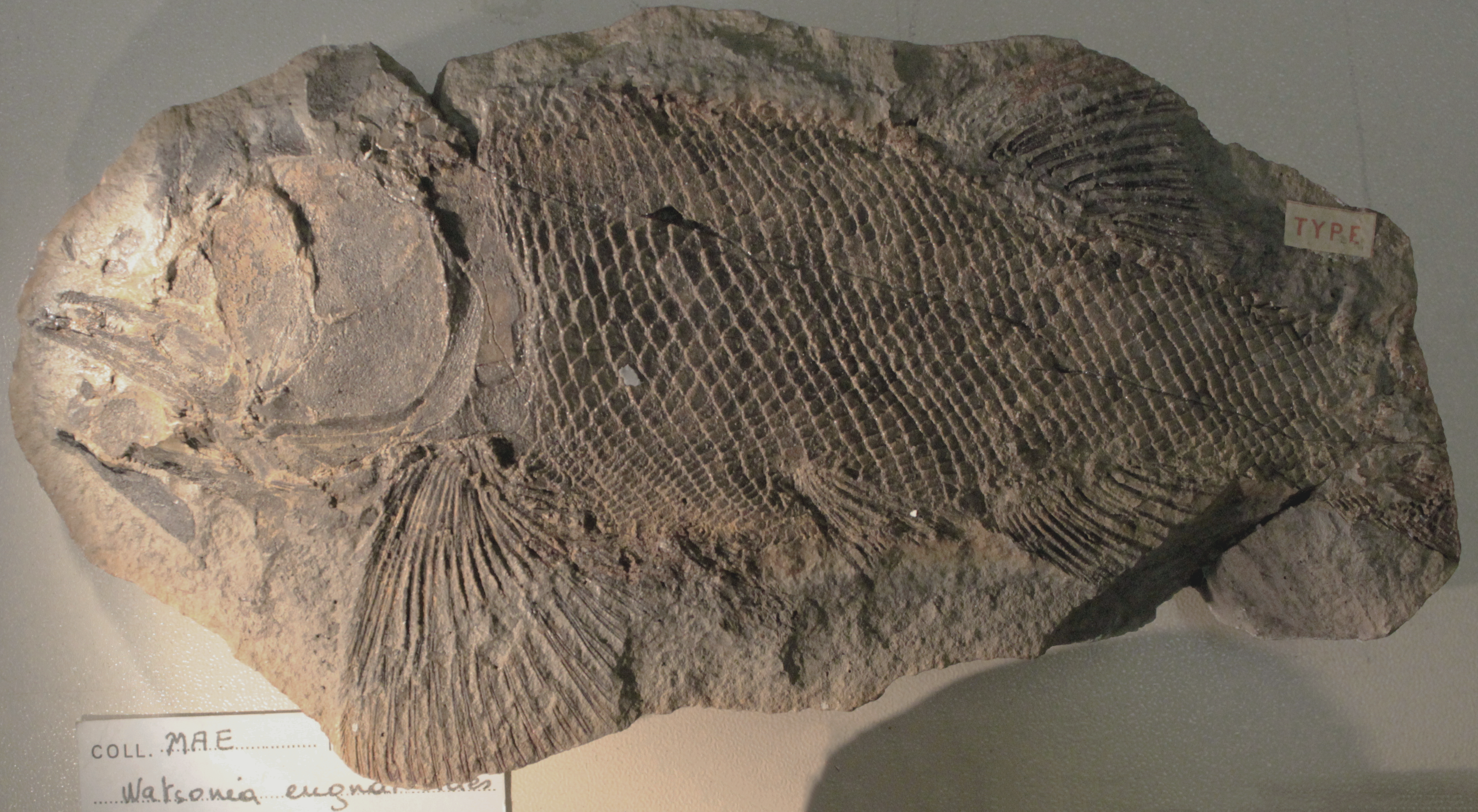
Watsonulus eugnathoides from the Early Triassic of Madagascar is one of the best known parasemionotiforms

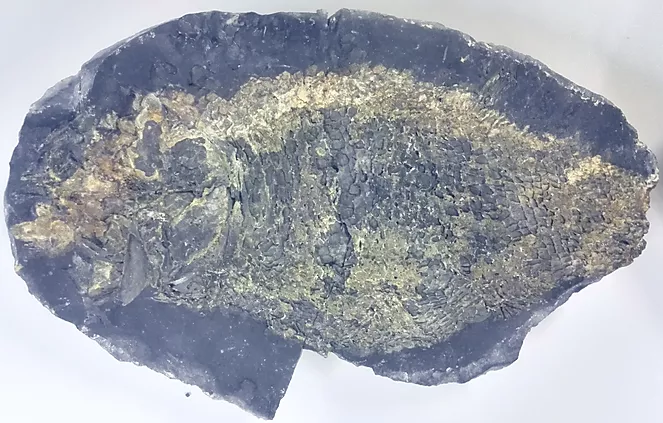
Candelarialepis argentus from the Early Triassic of Nevada was a medium-sized parasemionotiform

- Order †Parasemionotiformes Lehman, 1966
  - Family incertae sedis
    - Genus †Peia Ji, 2009
      - †Peia jurongensis Ji, 2009 (type species)
  - Family †Parasemionotidae Stensiö, 1932 (= Ospiidae Stensiö, 1932)
    - Genus †Parasemionotus Piveteau, 1929
      - †Parasemionotus labordei (Priem, 1924) (type species)
      - †Parasemionotus besairiei Lehman et al., 1959
    - Genus †Ospia Stensiö, 1932
      - †Ospia whitei Stensiö, 1932 (type species)
    - Genus †Broughia Stensiö, 1932
      - †Broughia perleididoides Stensiö, 1932 (type species)
    - Genus †Watsonulus Brough, 1939 (= Watsonia Piveteau, 1934)
      - †Watsonulus eugnathoides (Piveteau, 1934) (type species)
    - Genus †Stensionotus Lehman, 1952
      - †Stensionotus intercessus Lehman, 1952 (type species)
      - †Stensionotus dongchangensis Liu et al., 2002
    - Genus †Jacobulus Lehman, 1952
      - †Jacobulus novus Lehman, 1952 (type species)
    - Genus †Thomasinotus Lehman, 1952
      - †Thomasinotus divisus Lehman, 1952 (type species)
    - Genus †Albertonia Gardiner, 1966
      - †Albertonia cupidinia (Lambe, 1916) (type species)
    - Genus †Lehmanotus Beltan, 1968
      - †Lehmanotus markubai Beltan, 1968 (type species)
    - Genus †Devillersia Beltan, 1968
      - †Devillersia madagascariensis Beltan, 1968 (type species)
    - Genus †Piveteaunotus Beltan, 1968
      - †Piveteaunotus ifasiensis Beltan, 1968 (type species)
    - Genus †Icarealcyon Beltan, 1980
      - †Icarealcyon malagasium Beltan, 1980 (type species)
    - Genus †Jurongia Liu et al., 2002
      - †Jurongia fusiformis Liu et al., 2002 (type species)
    - Genus †Qingshania Liu et al., 2002
      - †Qingshania cercida Liu et al., 2002 (type species)
    - Genus †Suius Liu et al., 2002
      - †Suius brevis Liu et al., 2002 (type species)
    - Genus †Candelarialepis Romano et al., 2019
      - †Candelarialepis argentus Romano et al., 2019 (type species)
  - Family †Promecosominidae Wade, 1940
    - Genus †Promecosomina Wade, 1935
      - †Promecosomina formosa (Woodward, 1890) (type species) (= P. beaconensis Wade, 1935)

== See also ==
- List of prehistoric bony fish genera
