= Erik Stensiö =

Swedish paleontologist

Erik Helge Osvald Stensiö
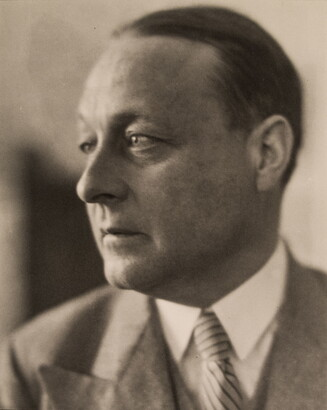
- Born: 2 October 1891; Stensjö by
- Died: 11 January 1984 (aged 92); Stockholm
- Other name: Erik Helge Oswald Andersson
- Occupation: Palaeontologist
- Title: Professor
- Spouse: Aina Laurell
- Parents: Johan Fredrik Andersson (father); Otilia Maria Erlandson (mother)
- Awards: Wollaston Medal; Linnean Medal; Darwin-Wallace Medal

Academic work
- Notable students: Meemann Chang; Erik Jarvik; Jean-Pierre Lehman; Eigil Nielsen; Tor Ørvig; Gunnar Säve-Söderbergh

Prof Erik Helge Osvald Stensiö ForMemRS HFRSE (2 October 1891 – 11 January 1984), né Andersson, was an influential Swedish paleozoologist and founder of the so-called "Stockholm School" of vertebrate paleontology. He later took his new surname, Stensiö, from his place of origin and is occasionally referred to with both names (as Erik Andersson Stensiö, Erik A. Stensiö or Erik A:son Stensiö)

== Life ==
Erik Helge Oswald Andersson, as his original name was, was born in the village of Stensjö by in Döderhult parish in Kalmar County, the son of Johan Fredrik Andersson (d.1907), a farmer, and his wife, Otilia Maria Erlandson (d.1940). He was educated at Linköping Gymnasium. He then studied science at the University of Uppsala, graduating BSc in 1912.

He received his Ph.D. and a docentship in paleontology from Uppsala University in 1921 and became professor and keeper at the Zoopaleontological (later called the Paleozoological) department of the Swedish Museum of Natural History in Stockholm in 1923, a position he held until his retirement in 1959.

Stensiö specialized in the anatomy and evolution of "lower" vertebrates. His studies of placoderms showed them to be related to modern sharks (though, now, placoderms are considered to be the sister group of all jawed vertebrates, in addition to sharks). His first major work, Triassic fishes from Spitzbergen (part I: Vienna 1921; part II: Stockholm 1925), was based on material collected during his expeditions to Spitzbergen in 1912, 1913, 1915 and 1916. For his work, The Downtonian and Devonian Vertebrates of Spitzbergen, Part I, Stensiö was awarded the Daniel Giraud Elliot Medal from the National Academy of Sciences in 1926.

In 1917 he changed his name from Andersson to Stensiö, adopting the name of his home-town.

He founded the so-called "Stockholm School" in paleozoology, continued notably by his successors in the professorship, Erik Jarvik and Tor Ørvig.

Stensiö was a member of the Royal Swedish Academy of Sciences from 1927 and was elected a Foreign Member of the Royal Society in 1946. He received the Wollaston Medal in 1953, and the Linnean Medal of the Linnean Society of London in 1957. He was awarded the Linnean Society of London's prestigious Darwin-Wallace Medal in 1958.

He died on 11 January 1984 at the Danderyd Hospital in Stockholm.

== Family ==
He was married to Aina Laurell.

== Legacy ==
Stensiö named several genera of prehistoric vertebrates:

- "Acidorhynchus" (=Saurorhynchus)
- Acrorhabdus
- Axelia
- Birgeria
- Boreaspis
- Boreosomus
- Braunosteus
- Broughia
- Buchanosteus
- Dictyonosteus
- Diplocercides
- Dobrowlania
- Endeiolepis
- "Glaucolepis" (=Pteronisculus)
- Helmolepis
- Kujdanowiaspis
- Laugia
- Meridensia
- Millerosteus
- Mylacanthus
- Ospia
- Sassenia
- Scleracanthus
- Sinamia
- Tapinosteus
- Walterosteus
- Wimania (="Leioderma")

He also named several higher taxa of prehistoric vertebrates:

- Aspinothoracidi
- Bobasatraniidae
- Coccosteomorphi
- Colobodontidae
- Dunkleosteidae
- Laugiidae
- Endeiolepididae
- Pachyosteomorphi
- Parasemionotidae (="Ospiidae")
- Phyllolepida
- Zenaspidida
- Zenaspididae

The Devonian placoderm fish Stensioella and the Triassic actinopterygian fish Stensionotus are named in his honour.

Stensöfjellet, a mountain in Sassendalen (Spitsbergen, Svalbard), is named after him.

== Selected publications ==
- Andersson, E. (1916). "Beschreibung einiger Fischreste aus Madagaskar und Siam". Bulletin of the Geological Institution of the University of Upsala (in German). 13: 227–232.
- Andersson, E. (1916). "Über einige Trias-Fische aus der Cava Trefontane, Tessin". Bulletin Géologique (in German). 15: 13–33.
- Stensiö, E. (1918). "Notes on a crossopterygian fish from the Upper Devonian of Spitzbergen". Bulletin of the Geological Institutions of the University of Upsala. 16: 115–124.
- Stensiö, E. (1918). "Notes on some fish remains collected at Hornsund by the Norwegian Spitzbergen expedition in 1917". Norsk Geologisk Tidsskrift. 5: 75–78.
- Stensiö, E. (1919). "Einige Bemerkungen über die systematische Stellung von Saurichthys mougeoti Agassiz". Senckenbergiana (in German). 1: 177–181.
- Stensiö, E. (1921). Triassic fishes from Spitzbergen 1. Wien: Adolf Holzhausen. pp. xxviii+307.
- Stensiö, E. (1922). "Über zwei Coelacanthiden aus dem Oberdevon von Wildungen". Paläontologische Zeitschrift (in German). 4 (2–3): 167–210. Bibcode:1922PalZ....4..167S. doi:10.1007/BF03041548. S2CID 186218500.
- Stensiö, E. (1925). "On the head of the macropetalichthyids, with certain remarks on the head of the other arthrodires". Chicago Field Museum of Natural History Publications 232, Geological Series. 4 (4): 87–197.
- Stensiö, E. (1925). "Triassic fishes from Spitzbergen 2". Kungliga Svenska Vetenskapsakademiens Handlingar. 3: 1–261.
- Stensiö, E. (1927). "The Downtonian and Devonian vertebrates of Spitsbergen. Part I, Family Cephalaspidae". Skrifter Om Svalbard og Nordishavet. 12: 1–391.
- Stensiö, E. (1932). "Triassic fishes from East Greenland 1–2". Meddelelser om Grønland. 83: 1–298.
- Stensiö, E. (1937). "On the Devonian coelacanthids of Germany with special reference to the dermal skeleton". Kungliga Svenska Vetenskapsakademiens Handlingar. Series 3. 16 (4): 1–56.
- Stensiö, E. (1947). "The sensory lines and dermal bones of the cheek in fishes and amphibians". Kungliga Svenska Vetenskapsakademiens Handlingar. Series 3. 22 (1): 1–195.
- Stensiö, E. (1958). "Les cyclostomes fossiles ou ostracodermes. I". In P.-P. Grassé (ed.). Traité de Zoologie XIII, 1 (in French). Paris: Masson et Cie. pp. 173–452.
- Stensiö, E. (1961). "Permian vertebrates". In G. O. Raasch (ed.). Geology of the Arctic 1. Toronto: University of Toronto Press. pp. 231–247.
- Stensiö, E. (1962). "Origine et nature des écailles placoides et des dents". Colloques Internationaux du Centre National de la Recherche Scientifique (in French). 104: 75–85.
- Stensiö, E. (1963). "Anatomical studies on the arthrodiran head. Part I". Kungliga Svenska Vetenskapsakademiens Handlingar. Series 3. 9 (2): 1–147.
- Stensiö, E. (1969). "Elasmobranchiomorphi; Placodermata; Arthrodires. I". In J. Piveteau (ed.). Traité de Paléontologie IV, 2 (in French). Paris: Masson et Cie. pp. 71–692.
