= Broughia =

Broughia Temporal range: Induan

Scientific classification
- Kingdom: Animalia
- Phylum: Chordata
- Class: Actinopterygii
- Order: †Parasemionotiformes
- Family: †Parasemionotidae
- Genus: †Broughia; Stensiö, 1932
- Species: †B. perleididoides

Binomial name
- †Broughia perleididoides Stensiö, 1932

Extinct genus of fishes

Broughia is an extinct genus of marine holostean ray-finned fish that lived during the Induan age of the Early Triassic epoch in what is now Greenland. Fossils were found in the Wordie Creek Formation. A potential concurrent record is also known from Madagascar.

== See also ==
- Prehistoric fish
- List of prehistoric bony fish
