= Korutichthys =

Korutichthys Temporal range: Earliest Triassic (Induan)

Scientific classification
- Kingdom: Animalia
- Phylum: Chordata
- Class: Actinopterygii
- Order: †Elonichthyiformes
- Genus: †Korutichthys; Kazantseva-Selezneva, 1980
- Species: †K. korutensis

Binomial name
- †Korutichthys korutensis Kazantseva-Selezneva, 1980

Extinct genus of fishes

Korutichthys is an extinct genus of prehistoric freshwater ray-finned fish that lived during the Induan (earliest Triassic) stage. It contains a single species, K. korutensis from the Maltseva Formation in what is now Krasnoyarsk Krai, Russia. It was initially thought to date to the Late Permian, and first referred to the family Amblypteridae, a view that was later questioned.

Alongside a concurrent fish from the same time and region, Avamia, Korutichthys suddenly appears in strata of the Maltseva Formation immediately following the Permian-Triassic boundary, suggesting a total turnover in local fish faunas following the Permian-Triassic extinction event. Uniquely, both these genera do not appear to be closely related to any of the fish that inhabited eastern Europe during the Late Permian or later parts of the Triassic, and instead most closely resemble fish that inhabited North America and western Europe during the Late Carboniferous and Early Permian.

== See also ==
- Prehistoric fish
- List of prehistoric bony fish
