= Wordie Creek Formation =

Geologic formation in Greenland

- Stratigraphic range: late Changhsingian–early Dienerian
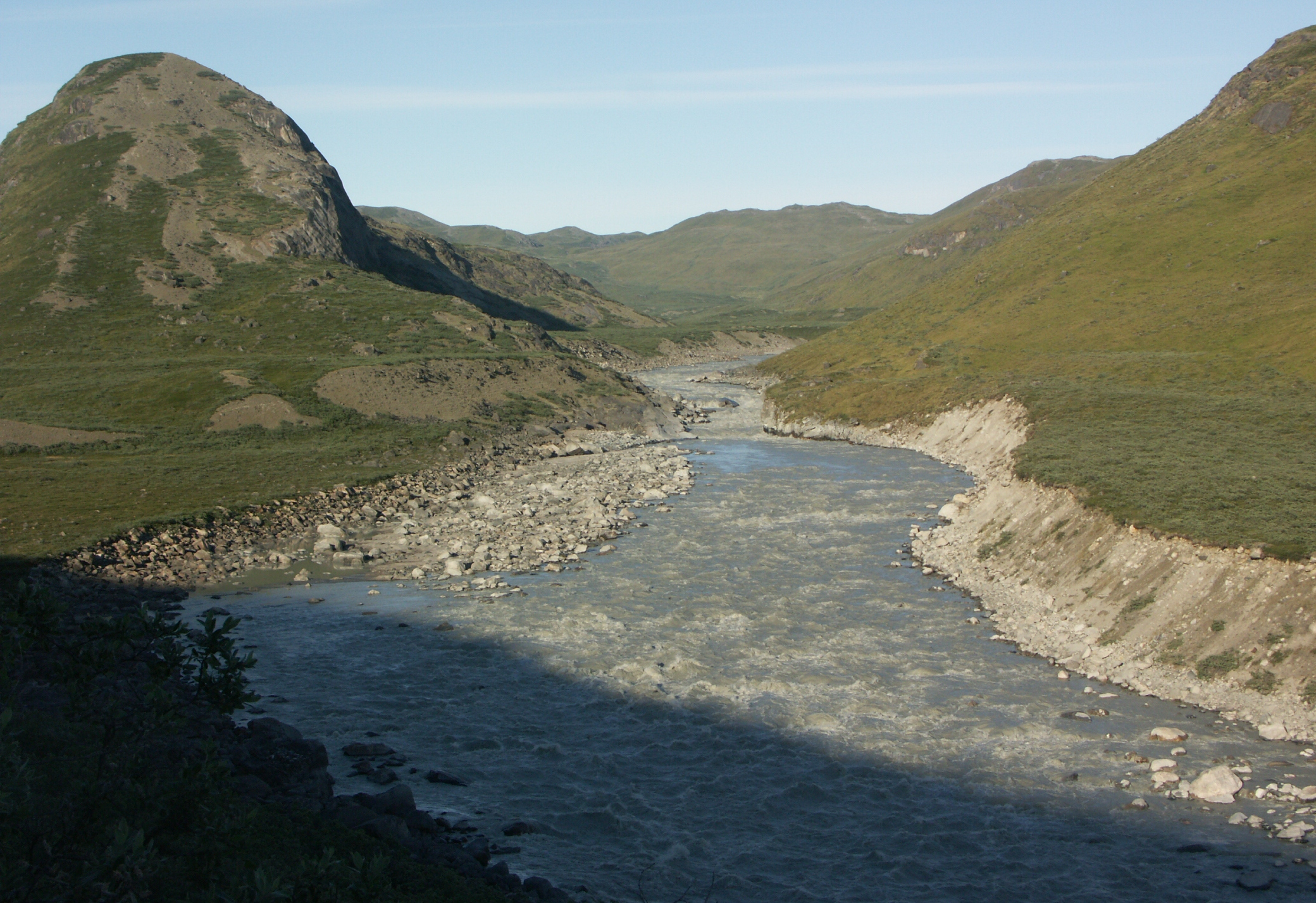
- The “Roapaluk Fjord” track site at the Wordie Creek Formation
- Type: Formation
- Unit of: Scoresby Land Group
- Underlies: Pingo Dal Formation
- Overlies: Schuchert Dal Formation

Lithology
- Primary: Mudstone
- Other: Sandstone, conglomerate

Location
- Region: Clavering Ø, Hold with Hope (Kap Stosch), Gauss Halvø, Traill Ø, Jameson Land
- Country: Greenland
- Wordie Creek Formation (Greenland)

The Wordie Creek Formation is an uppermost Permian and Lower Triassic geologic formation in Greenland, outcrops of which are located in Northeast Greenland National Park (until 2008 Tunu County, Danish: Østgrønland, English: East Greenland). In 2017, it was suggested to be raised to group status, as the Wordie Creek Group.

The Lower Triassic sediments in the region were discovered in 1926 independently by James Wordie and Lauge Koch, and the latter named the formation. The rock layers preserve fossils of invertebrates (e.g., ammonoids, gastropods), fishes (coelacanths, ray-finned fish, cartilaginous fish) and temnospondyl amphibians, dating back to the Induan age.

== Geology ==
Following Surlyk et al., the Wordie Creek Group is subdivided into two formations, the Kap Stosch Formation and the overlying Godthåb Golf Formation. The Kap Stosch Formation was deposited in relatively deep, partly isolated turbiditic basin, and the Godthåb Golf Formation under relatively shallow marine conditions.

In 1935, Eigil Nielsen recognized five fossil-bearing horizons ("fish zones 1–5") corresponding to three ammonoid zones (in ascending order):

- Otoceras zone ("fish zones 1 and 2")
- Vishnuites zone ("fish zones 3 and 4")
- Proptychites zone ("fish zone 5")

The first two ammonoid zones are Griesbachian in age and the last one is Dienerian in age (Induan). The Kap Stosch Formation corresponds to these three zones. A sixth fossiliferous layer, the "Stegocephalian horizon", is present above, which belongs to the Godthåb Golf Formation (Dienerian). The Hypophiceras triviale ammonoid zone below Nielsen's "fish zones" is dated late Changhsingian.

The Kap Stosch Formation is subdivided into the following eight members (in ascending order):

- Nebalopok Member (upper Changhsingian–lower Griesbachian)
- Immaqa Member (lower Griesbachian)
- Fiskeplateau Member (lower Griesbachian)
- Knolden Member (lower Griesbachian)
- Pyramiden Member (lower–upper Griesbachian)
- Naasut Member (upper Griesbachian)
- Falkeryg Member (lower Dienerian)
- Vestplateau Member (lower Dienerian)

The Godthåb Golf Formation is not subdivided into members.

== Paleobiota ==
A diverse vertebrate fauna composed of temnospondyl amphibians and fishes is known from the formation. Fossil fishes are also known from the Permian Ravnefjeld Formation ("Posidonomya shale") of Greenland.

=== Amphibians ===
Color key: Taxon / Reclassified taxon / Taxon falsely reported as present / Dubious taxon or junior synonym / Ichnotaxon / Ootaxon / Morphotaxon	Notes; Uncertain or tentative taxa are in small text; ~~crossed out~~ taxa are discredited.

Temnospondyls of the Wordie Creek Formation
Taxon / Genus	Species	Subunit	Notes	Images
Luzocephalus	L. johannsoni	?	A lydekkerinid stereospondyl, originally described as "Lyrocephalus"	Tupilakosaurus
Luzocephalus	L. kochi	Kap Stosch Formation, Pyramiden Member ("Fish zone 2"), Falkeryg Member ("Fish zone 5")	A lydekkerinid stereospondyl, originally described as "Lyrocephalus"	Tupilakosaurus
Luzocephalus	L. rapax	Kap Stosch Formation, Falkeryg Member ("Fish zone 5")	A lydekkerinid stereospondyl, originally described as "Lyrocephalus"	Tupilakosaurus
Selenocara	S. groenlandica	Godthåb Golf Formation ("Stegocephalian horizon")	A mastodonsauroid, originally described as Wetlugasaurus groenlandicus	Tupilakosaurus
Stoschiosaurus	S. nielseni	Godthåb Golf Formation ("Stegocephalian horizon")	A trematosaurid	Tupilakosaurus
Tupilakosaurus	T. heilmani	Kap Stosch Formation, Falkeryg Member ("Fish zone 5")	A tupilakosaurid dvinosaur	Tupilakosaurus

=== Fish ===
==== Lobe-finned ====
Color key: Taxon / Reclassified taxon / Taxon falsely reported as present / Dubious taxon or junior synonym / Ichnotaxon / Ootaxon / Morphotaxon	Notes; Uncertain or tentative taxa are in small text; ~~crossed out~~ taxa are discredited.

Sarcopterygii of the Wordie Creek Formation
Taxon / Genus	Species	Subunit	Notes	Images
Laugia	L. groenlandica	Kap Stosch Formation, Pyramiden Member ("Fish zones 2–3")	A laugiid coelacanth	Laugia
Laugia	Laugia sp.	Kap Stosch Formation ("Fish zone 1")	A laugiid coelacanth	Laugia
Sassenia	S. groenlandica	?	A rhabdodermatid coelacanth that was originally referred to as Sassenia sp. The genus is also known from the Vikinghøgda Formation of Spitsbergen	Laugia
Whiteia	W. nielseni	?	A whiteiid coelacanth that was originally described as Whiteia sp. and "undetermined coelacanth". The genus Whiteia had a cosmopolitan distribution during the Triassic	Laugia

==== Ray-finned ====
Color key: Taxon / Reclassified taxon / Taxon falsely reported as present / Dubious taxon or junior synonym / Ichnotaxon / Ootaxon / Morphotaxon	Notes; Uncertain or tentative taxa are in small text; ~~crossed out~~ taxa are discredited.

Actinopterygii of the Wordie Creek Formation
Taxon / Genus	Species	Subunit	Notes	Images
Australosomus	A. kochi	Kap Stosch Formation, Pyramiden Member ("Fish zones 2–4") and Falkeryg Member ("Fish zone 5")	A pholidopleuriform neopterygian. The genus had a cosmopolitan distribution during the Early Triassic epoch	Birgeria
Australosomus	A. simplex	Kap Stosch Formation (Pyramiden Member, "Fish zone 2")	A pholidopleuriform neupterygian. The genus had a cosmopolitan distribution during the Early Triassic epoch	Birgeria
Australosomus	A. aff. simplex	Kap Stosch Formation, Falkeryg Member ("Fish zone 5")	A pholidopleuriform neupterygian. The genus had a cosmopolitan distribution during the Early Triassic epoch	Birgeria
Australosomus	A. pholidopleuroides	Kap Stosch Formation (Pyramiden Member, "Fish zone 2")	A pholidopleuriform neupterygian. The genus had a cosmopolitan distribution during the Early Triassic epoch	Birgeria
Birgeria	B. groenlandica	Kap Stosch Formation, Pyramiden Member ("Fish zone 2"), Falkeryg Member ("Fish zone 5")	A birgeriid. The genus had a cosmopolitan distribution during the Triassic	Birgeria
Bobasatrania	B. groenlandica	Kap Stosch Formation, Pyramiden Member ("Fish zones 2–3")	A bobasatraniform The genus had a cosmopolitan distribution during the Triassic	Birgeria
Bobasatrania	Bobasatrania sp.	Nebalopok Member	A bobasatraniform. One of the few Permian occurrences of the genus	Birgeria
Boreosomus	B. piveteaui	Kap Stosch Formation, Pyramiden Member ("Fish zones 2–4"), Falkeryg Member ("Fish zone 5")	A ptycholepid. The genus had a cosmopolitan distribution during the Early Triassic epoch	Birgeria
Broughia	B. perleididoides	Kap Stosch Formation, Pyramiden Member ("Fish zone 3"), Falkeryg Member ("Fish zone 5")	A parasemionotiform neopterygian	Birgeria
Helmolepis	H. gracilis	Kap Stosch Formation, Pyramiden Member ("Fish zones 2–4")	A platysiagid neopterygian. The genus had a cosmopolitan distribution during the Early Triassic	Birgeria
Ospia	O. whitei	Kap Stosch Formation, Pyramiden Member ("Fish zone 3"), Falkeryg Member ("Fish zone 5")	A parasemionotiform neopterygian	Birgeria
Pteronisculus	P. arcticus	Kap Stosch Formation, Pyramiden Member ("Fish zone 2")	A rhadinichthyid or turseoid, It was originally described as Glaucolepis arctica, but later referred to the genus Pteronisculus because the genus name Glaucolepis is preoccupied	Birgeria
Pteronisculus	P. aldingeri	Kap Stosch Formation, Pyramiden Member ("Fish zones 2 and 4")	A rhadinichthyid or turseoid, It was originally described as Glaucolepis aldingeri, but later referred to the genus Pteronisculus because the genus name Glaucolepis is preoccupied	Birgeria
Pteronisculus	P. gunnari	Kap Stosch Formation, Pyramiden Member ("Fish zones 2?–3")	A rhadinichthyid or turseoid, It was originally described as Glaucolepis gunnari, but later referred to the genus Pteronisculus because the genus name Glaucolepis is preoccupied	Birgeria
Pteronisculus	P. magnus	Kap Stosch Formation, Falkeryg Member ("Fish zone 5")	A rhadinichthyid or turseoid, It was originally described as Glaucolepis magna, but later referred to the genus Pteronisculus because the genus name Glaucolepis is preoccupied	Birgeria
Pteronisculus	P. stensioei	Kap Stosch Formation, Falkeryg Member ("Fish zone 5")	A rhadinichthyid or turseoid, It was originally described as Glaucolepis stensioei, but later referred to the genus Pteronisculus because the genus name Glaucolepis is preoccupied	Birgeria
Pteronisculus	Pteronisculus sp.	Kap Stosch Formation, Pyramiden Member ("Fish zones 2–4"), Godthåb Golf Formation ("Stegocephalian horizon")	A rhadinichthyid or turseoid, It was originally referred to the genus Glaucolepis, a homonym of Pteronisculus	Birgeria
Saurichthys	S. aff. dayi	Kap Stosch Formation, Pyramiden Member ("Fish zone 2"), Falkeryg Member ("Fish zone 5")	A saurichthyiform with a dense squamation	Birgeria
Saurichthys	S. cf. ornatus	Kap Stosch Formation, Falkeryg Member ("Fish zone 5")	A three-dimensionally preserved skull of a saurichthyiform, which was analyzed using μCT-aided tomography	Birgeria
Teffichthys	T. stoschiensis	Kap Stosch Formation, Pyramiden Member ("Fish zones 2–4"), Falkeryg Member ("Fish zone 5")	A perleidiform neopterygian. It was originally described as Perleidus stoschiensis. Early Triassic species of Perleidus were subsequently referred to the genus Teffichthys	Birgeria

==== Cartilaginous ====
Color key: Taxon / Reclassified taxon / Taxon falsely reported as present / Dubious taxon or junior synonym / Ichnotaxon / Ootaxon / Morphotaxon	Notes; Uncertain or tentative taxa are in small text; ~~crossed out~~ taxa are discredited.

Chondrichthyes of the Wordie Creek Formation
Taxon / Genus	Species	Subunit	Notes	Images
Polyacrodus	P. claveringensis	Kap Stosch Formation, Pyramiden Member ("Fish zone 2")	A polyacrodontid hybodontiform shark. Known from isolated teeth and partial skeletons with fin spines	Hybodus
Nemacanthus?	N.? sp.	"Fish zone 1"	Fin spines of the Nemacanthus-type	Hybodus
Edestidae	Gen. et sp. indet	Kap Stosch Formation, Pyramiden Member ("Fish zone 2")	Symphyseal tooth whorl of a eugeneodontid holocephalian	Hybodus
Hybodontiformes	Gen. et sp. indet	"Fish zone 1"	Fin spines of the Hybodus/Acrodus-type	Hybodus

== See also ==
- List of fossiliferous stratigraphic units in Greenland
