= Ospia =

Ospia Temporal range: Induan

Scientific classification
- Kingdom: Animalia
- Phylum: Chordata
- Class: Actinopterygii
- Order: †Parasemionotiformes
- Family: †Parasemionotidae
- Genus: †Ospia; Stensiö, 1932
- Species: †O. whitei

Binomial name
- †Ospia whitei Stensiö, 1932

Extinct genus of fishes

Ospia is an extinct genus of neopterygian ray-finned fish that lived during the Induan age of the Early Triassic epoch in what is now Greenland. Fossils were found in the Wordie Creek Formation.

== See also ==
- Prehistoric fish
- List of prehistoric bony fish
