= Jean-Pierre Lehman =

French paleontologist

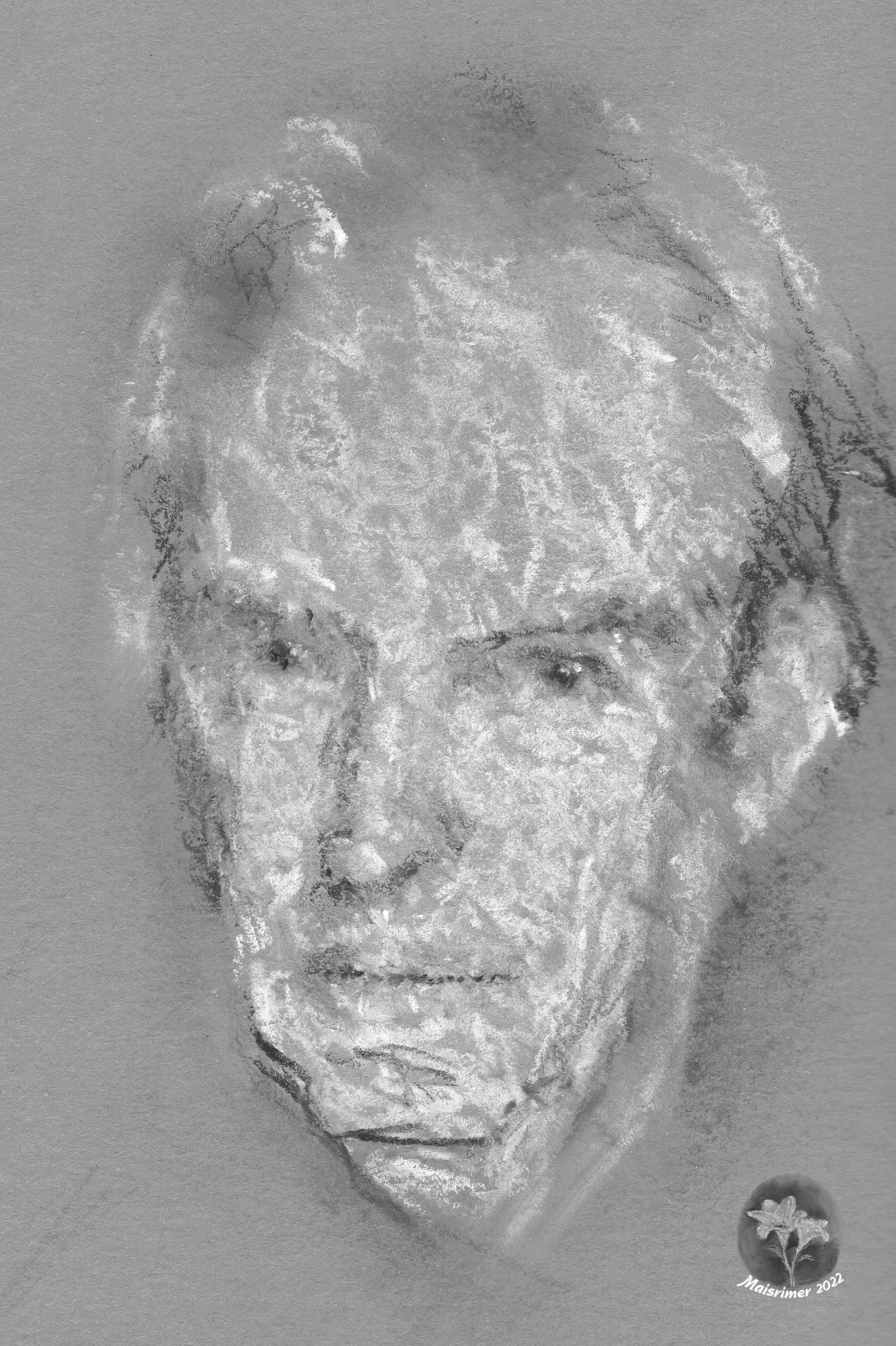
- charcoal drawing
- Born: 10 August 1914; Caen
- Died: 26 February 1981 (aged 66); 5th arrondissement of Paris
- Occupation: Palaeontologist
- Title: Professor
- Spouse: Ingegärd Eneström
- Parents: Gaston Lehman (father); Madeleine Auvray (mother)

Academic background
- Doctoral advisor: Erik Stensiö, Fritz Brotzen

Jean-Pierre Lehman (10 August 1914 – 26 February 1981) was a French paleontologist who specialized on tetrapods and actinopterygians. He followed early ideas comparative anatomy to study evolution through cladistic ideas and making use of biogeographical affinities.

Lehman was born in Caen to Madeleine Auvray and civil engineer Gaston Lehman. Educated at Lycée Carnot, and the Sorbonne he also went to Grenoble where he met and married Ingegärd Eneström, daughter of Swedish physician Erik Hjalmar Eneström. Visits to Sweden brought him into contact with Erik Stensiö at the Museum of Natural History of Stockholm where he worked on the vertebrates of the Upper Devonian of Scania in 1936–37. His thesis on the scales of thelodonts and acanthodians was criticized and led to a restudy of the material by J.M.J. Vergoossen. He worked as a high school teacher in Nice from 1940 to 1945 and made visits to Stockholm between 1945 and 1949. In 1950 he moved to the geology laboratory of the faculty of science in Paris and became a professor in 1956. In 1969 he went on a collection trip to Spitsbergen (Svalbard). He also examined fossil fish from Africa and Madagascar.

He was a follower of Stensiö's ideas in cladistics and defended them. His students worked on paleoanatomy and built up the institut de paléontologie.

He edited Les annales de paléontologie and was elected fellow of the French academy of sciences in 1979.

== Legacy ==
The Triassic ray-finned fish Lehmanotus and the Devonian arthrodire placoderm fish Lehmanosteus are named in his honour.

Lehman named the iconic Devonian placoderm Dunkleosteus in 1956. He also named several other genera of fossil fish, among others: Errolichthys, Jacobulus, Nielsenia, Oervigia, Paraceratodus, Piveteauia, Sakamenichthys, Soederberghia, Stensionotus and Thomasinotus. He furthermore named the temnospondyl amphibians Tertremoides and Wantzosaurus.

== Selected publications ==
- Lehman, J.-P. (1948). "Sur la présence du genre Birgeria (Paléoniscoïdé) dans l'Eotrias de Madagascar". Comptes Rendus Hebdomadaires des Séances de l'Académie des Sciences de Paris (in French). 226: 426–428.
- Lehman, J.-P. (1952). "Etude complémentaire des poissons de l'Eotrias de Madagascar". Kungliga Svenska Vetenskapsakademiens Handlingar (in French). 4: 1–192.
- Lehman, J.-P. (1953). "Etude d'un Perleidus du Trias de Madagascar". Annales de Paléontologie (in French). 39: 3–18.
- Lehman, J.-P. (1956). "Compléments à l'étude des genres Ecrinesomus et Bobasatrania de l'Eotrias de Madagascar". Annales de Paléontologie (in French). 42: 67–94.
- Lehman, J.-P. (1956). "Les arthrodires du Dévonien supérieur du Tafilalet (Sud Marocain)". Notes et Mémoires. Service Géologique du Maroc (in French). 129: 1–170.
- Lehman, J.-P. (1959). "Les dipneustes du Dévonien supérieur du Groenland". Meddelelser om Grønland (in French). 160: 1–58.
- Lehman, J.P.; Château, C.; Laurain, M.; Nauche, M. (1959). "Paléontologie de Madagascar XXVII, Les poissons de la Sakamena moyenne". Annales de Paléontologie (in French). 45: 175–219.
- Lehman, J.-P. (1964). "Etude d'un Saurichthydé de la région d'Oden (Espagne)". Annales de Paléontologie (Vertébrés) (in French). 50: 25–30.
- Lehman, J.-P. (1965). "Les progrès récents de la paleontologie des vertébrés du Trias au sud de la méditerranée". Israel Journal of Ecology and Evolution (in French). 14: 173–184.
- Lehman, J.-P. (1966). "Actinopterygii". In J. Piveteau (ed.). Traité de paléontologie IV, 3 (in French). Paris: Masson. pp. 1–242.
- Lehman, J.-P. (1975). "A propos de Ceratodus sturii Teller, 1891". Bulletin du Muséum National d'Histoire Naturelle. 3ème Série (in French). 345: 241–245.
- Lehman, J.-P. (1979). "Note sur les poissons du Trias de Lunz 1. Thoracopterus Bronn". Annalen des Naturhistorischen Museums in Wien (in French). 82: 53–66.
- Lehman, J.-P. (1980). "Le genre Scanilepis Aldinger du Rhétien de la Scanie (Suede)". Bulletin of the Geological Institutions of the University of Uppsala (in French). 8: 113–132.
- Lehman, J.-P. (1981). "Le genre Hyllingea Aldinger du Rhétien de la Scanie". Bulletin of the Geological Institutions of the University of Uppsala. New Series (in French). 9: 13–28.
