= Dictyonosteus =

Dictyonosteus Temporal range: Devonian

Scientific classification
- Kingdom: Animalia
- Phylum: Chordata
- Family: †Diplocercidae
- Genus: †Dictyonosteus; Stensiö, 1918

Extinct genus of fishes

Dictyonosteus is a genus of prehistoric coelacanth fish which lived during the Late Devonian period. Fossils have been found in Spitsbergen, Norway.
