= Oervigia =

Scientific classification
- Domain: Eukaryota
- Kingdom: Animalia
- Phylum: Chordata
- Clade: Sarcopterygii
- Class: Dipnoi
- Family: †Rhinodipteridae
- Genus: †Oervigia; Lehman, 1959

Type species
- †Oervigia nordica Lehman, 1959 Lehman, 1959

Extinct genus of fishes

Oervigia is an extinct genus of lungfish in the family Rhinodipteridae from the Devonian of Greenland.

== See also ==
- Sarcopterygii
- List of sarcopterygians
- List of prehistoric bony fish
