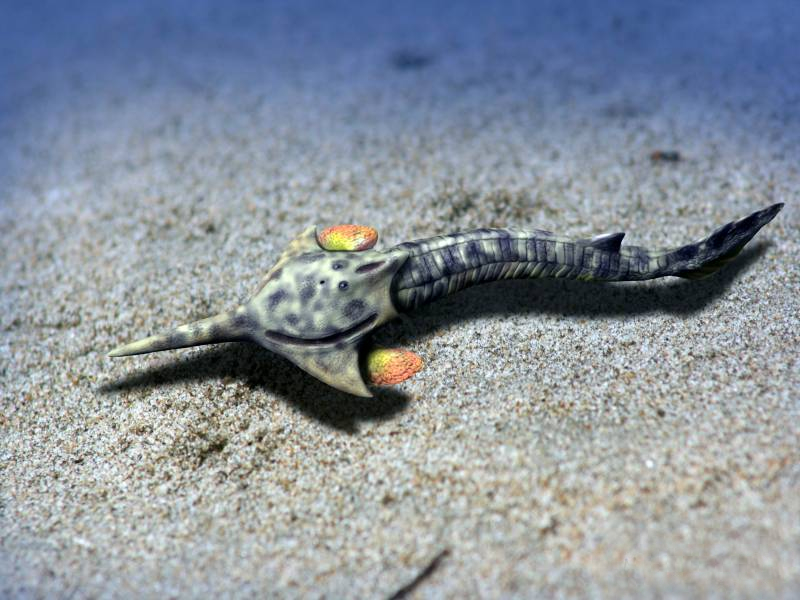
- CGI reconstruction of B. rostrata

Scientific classification
- Kingdom: Animalia
- Phylum: Chordata
- Infraphylum: Agnatha
- Class: †Osteostraci
- Order: †Benneviaspidida
- Family: †Boreaspididae
- Genus: †Boreaspis; Stensiö, 1927

Species
- †B. rostrata Stensiö, 1927 (type); †B. batoides Wangsjö, 1952; †B. macrorhynchus Wangsjö, 1952; †B. puella Wangsjo, 1952; †B. spinicornis Wangsjö, 1952; †B. triangularis Wangsjö, 1952; †"B." ceratops Wangsjo, 1952; †"B." intermedia Wangsjö, 1952

= Boreaspis =

Boreaspis Temporal range: Pragian-Emsian

Extinct genus of jawless fishes

Boreaspis (meaning "Boreas's Shield") is an extinct genus of osteostracan agnathan vertebrate that lived in the Devonian period.

Fourteen different species of Boreaspis have been found in sandstone of the lagoons and estuaries of Devonian Spitsbergen; however, some of these likely do not belong to the genus. The species B. robusta and B. costata have been reassigned to Spatulaspis; and B. circinus, B. curtirostris, and B. gracilis now belong to Dicranaspis.

Species of Boreaspis were very small, with head shields about 2 centimetres (0.79 in) long. All species possessed a long spathe-like rostrum derived from the anterior-most end of the head shield, which would have enhanced the fish's hydrodynamics and was probably also used to root out food buried beneath the substrate.
