= Peia (fish) =

Peia Temporal range: Early Triassic

Scientific classification
- Kingdom: Animalia
- Phylum: Chordata
- Class: Actinopterygii
- Order: †Parasemionotiformes
- Family: †Parasemionotidae
- Genus: †Peia; Li, 2009

Type species
- †Peia jurongensis (Li, 2009)

Extinct genus of Triassic fishes

Peia is an extinct genus of prehistoric ray-finned fish that lived during the Early Triassic in what is now the Jiangsu Province in China. Its species name is derived from Jurong, where it was discovered in Qingshan Quarry. It is currently known from a single specimen, collected in 1997.

== See also ==
- Prehistoric fish
- List of prehistoric bony fish
