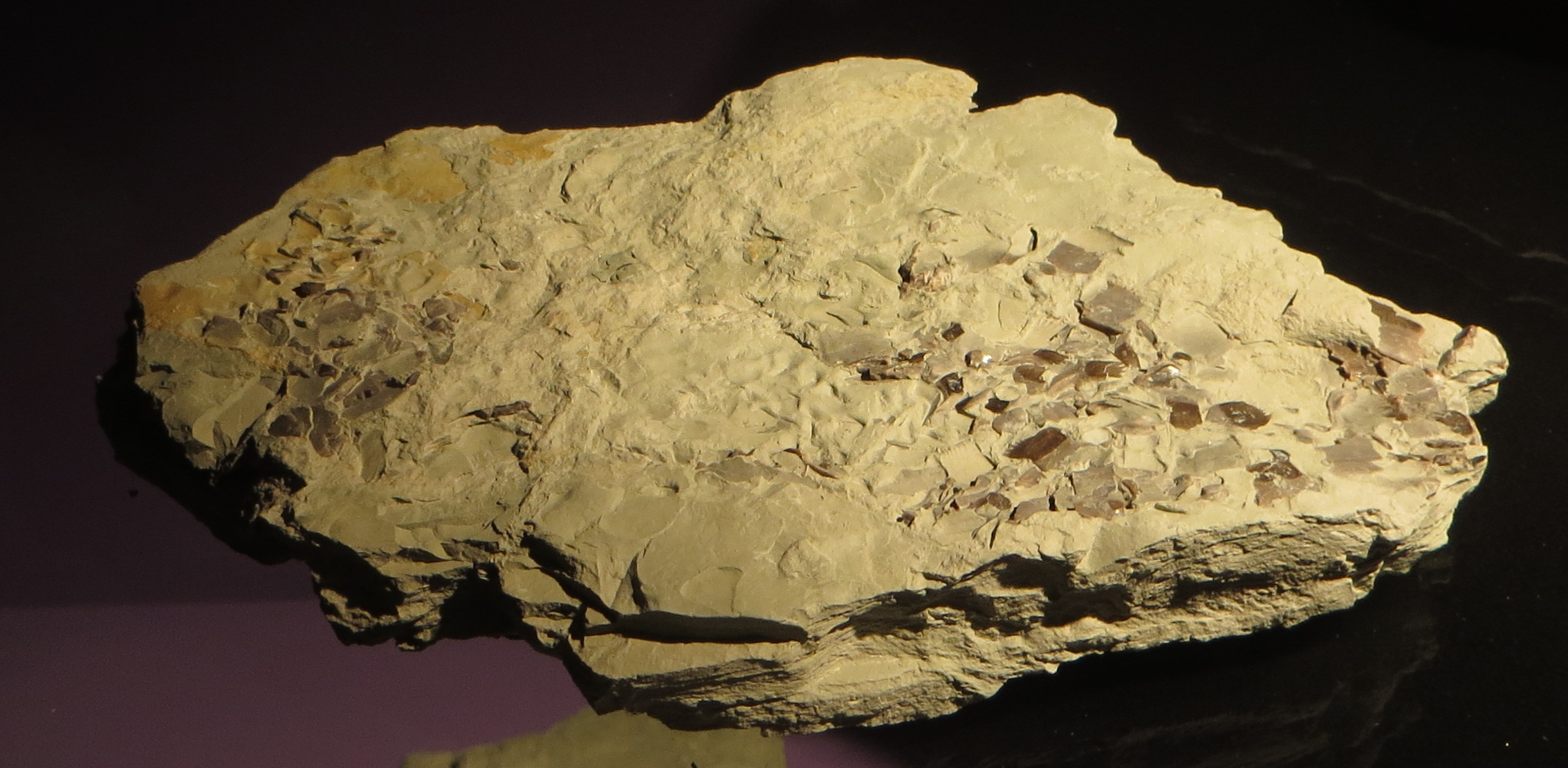
- Fossil

Scientific classification
- Kingdom: Animalia
- Phylum: Chordata
- Class: Actinopterygii
- Subclass: Neopterygii
- Genus: †Dollopterus; Abel, 1906

Species
- D. brunsvicensis Stolley, 1920; D. subserratus Stolley, 1920; D. volitans (Compter, 1892)

= Dollopterus =

Dollopterus Temporal range: Anisian

Extinct genus of fishes

Dollopterus (meaning "Dollo's wing") is an extinct genus of prehistoric marine ray-finned fish that lived during the Anisian stage of the Middle Triassic epoch. It contains several species known primarily from the Muschelkalk of Germany.

The following species are known:

- D. brunsvicensis Stolley, 1920 - Anisian of North Rhine-Westphalia and Lower Saxony
- D. subserratus Stolley, 1920 - Anisian of Lower Saxony
- D. volitans (Compter, 1892) - Anisian of Lower Saxony

Indeterminate remains are known from the Netherlands.

== See also ==
- Prehistoric fish
- List of prehistoric bony fish
