= Stensjö by =

Coordinates: 57.345514°N 16.465765°E

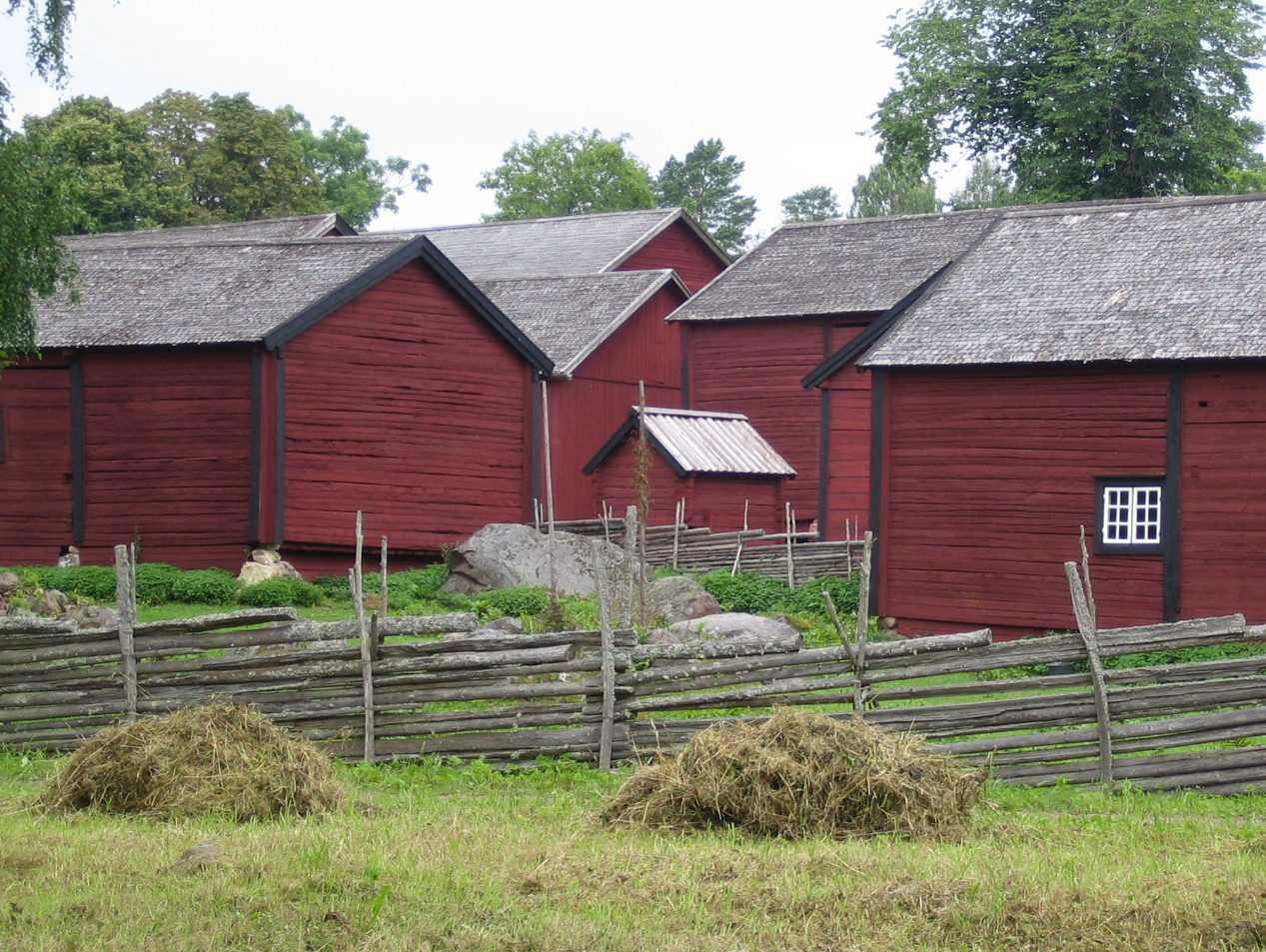
Stensjö by

Stensjö by is a hamlet located about 10 kilometers north of Oskarshamn in Sweden. The hamlet and the surrounding landscape are well preserved from the 18th and 19th centuries.

== General information ==
Stensjö by is owned by the Royal Swedish Academy of Letters, History and Antiquities since 1960. The aim is to preserve the hamlet and its lands in its state from the early 1900s. The hamlet itself consists of a cluster of old wooden buildings painted in red. The surrounding landscape also has an important cultural value. It is well preserved with pastures surrounded by roundpole fences. Here cows, sheep and pigs are still grazing. Stensjö by was the film site for many of the scenes in the filmed version of Astrid Lindgren's The Six Bullerby Children, as well as in the film Emil i Lönneberga.

== Photo gallery ==
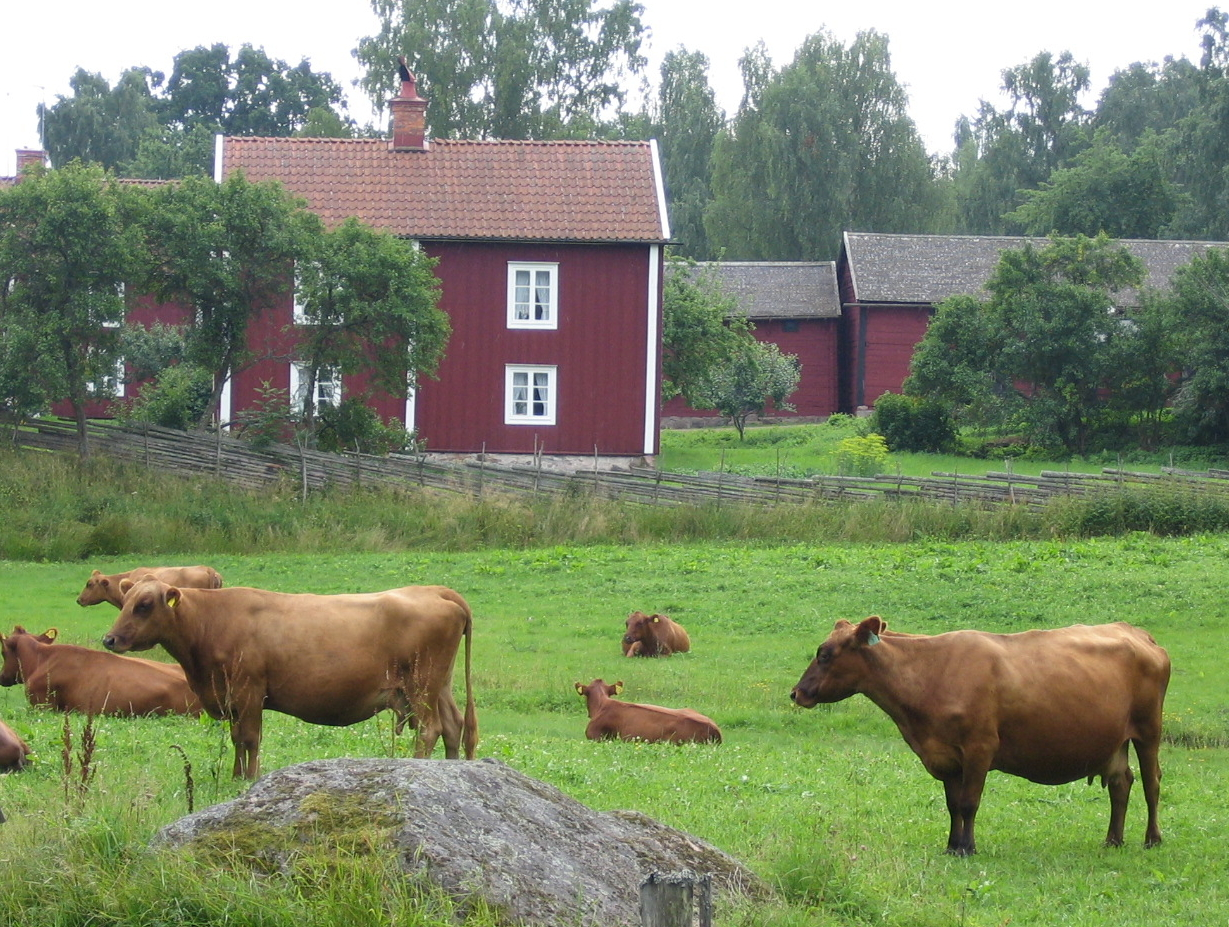

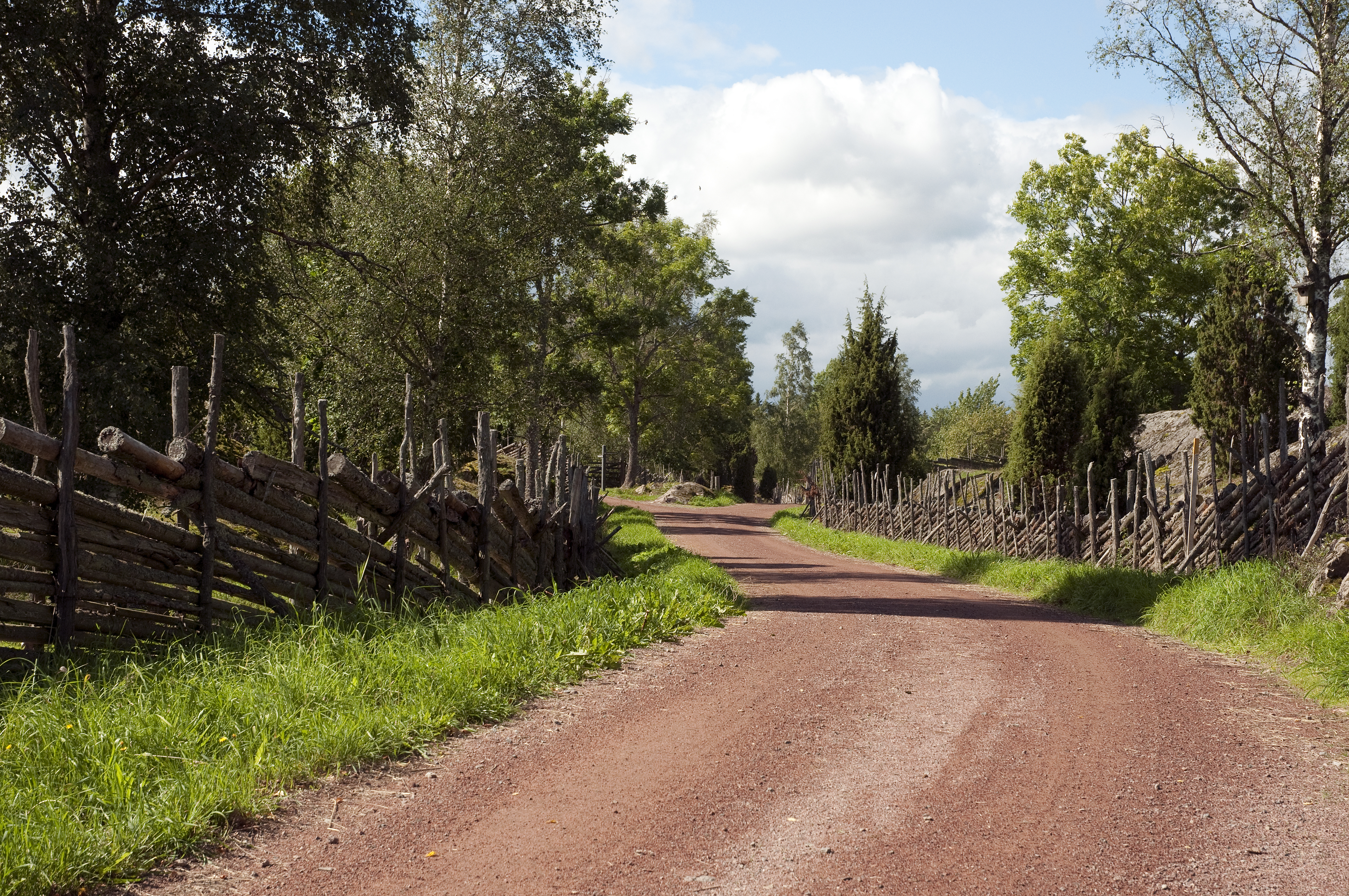

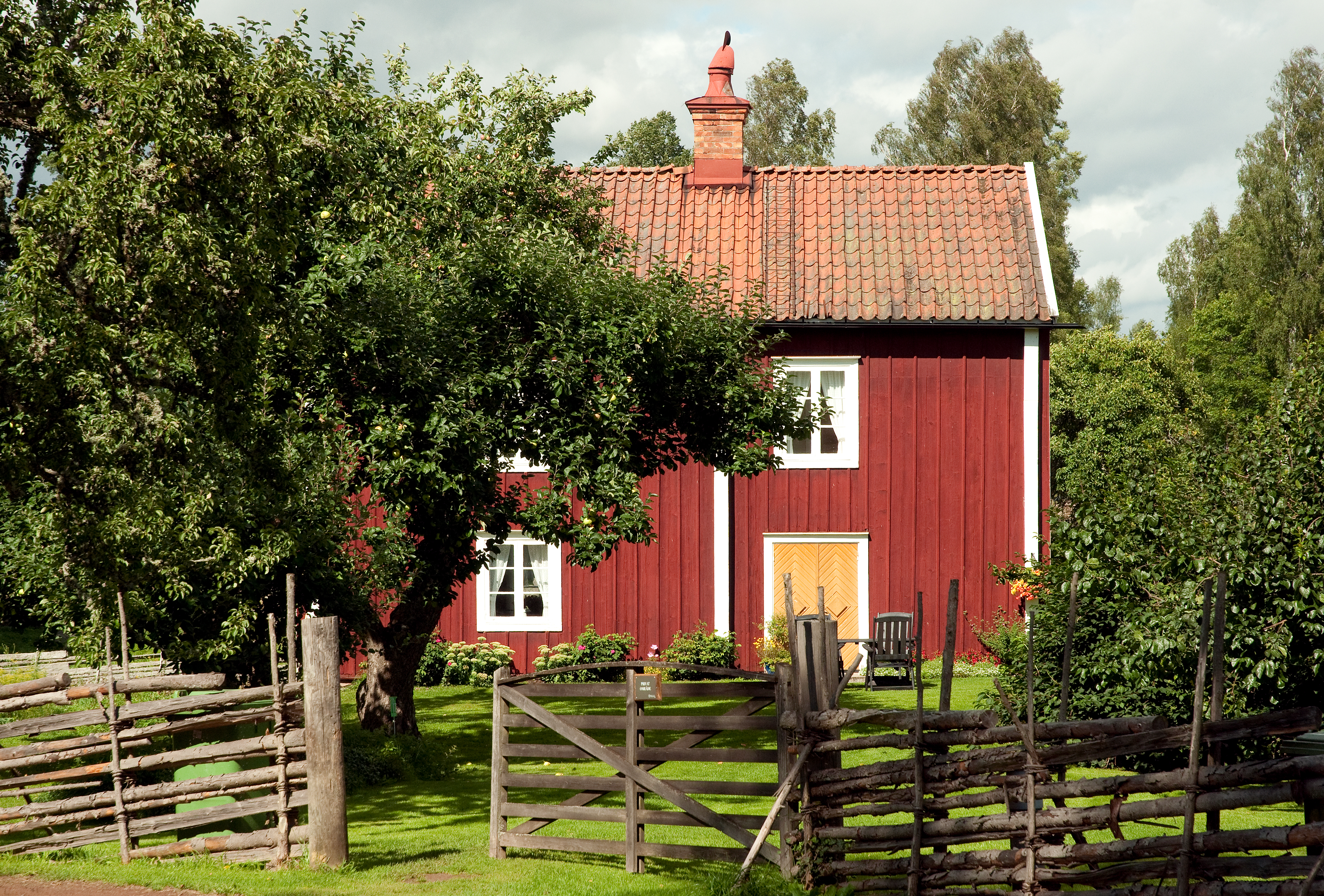

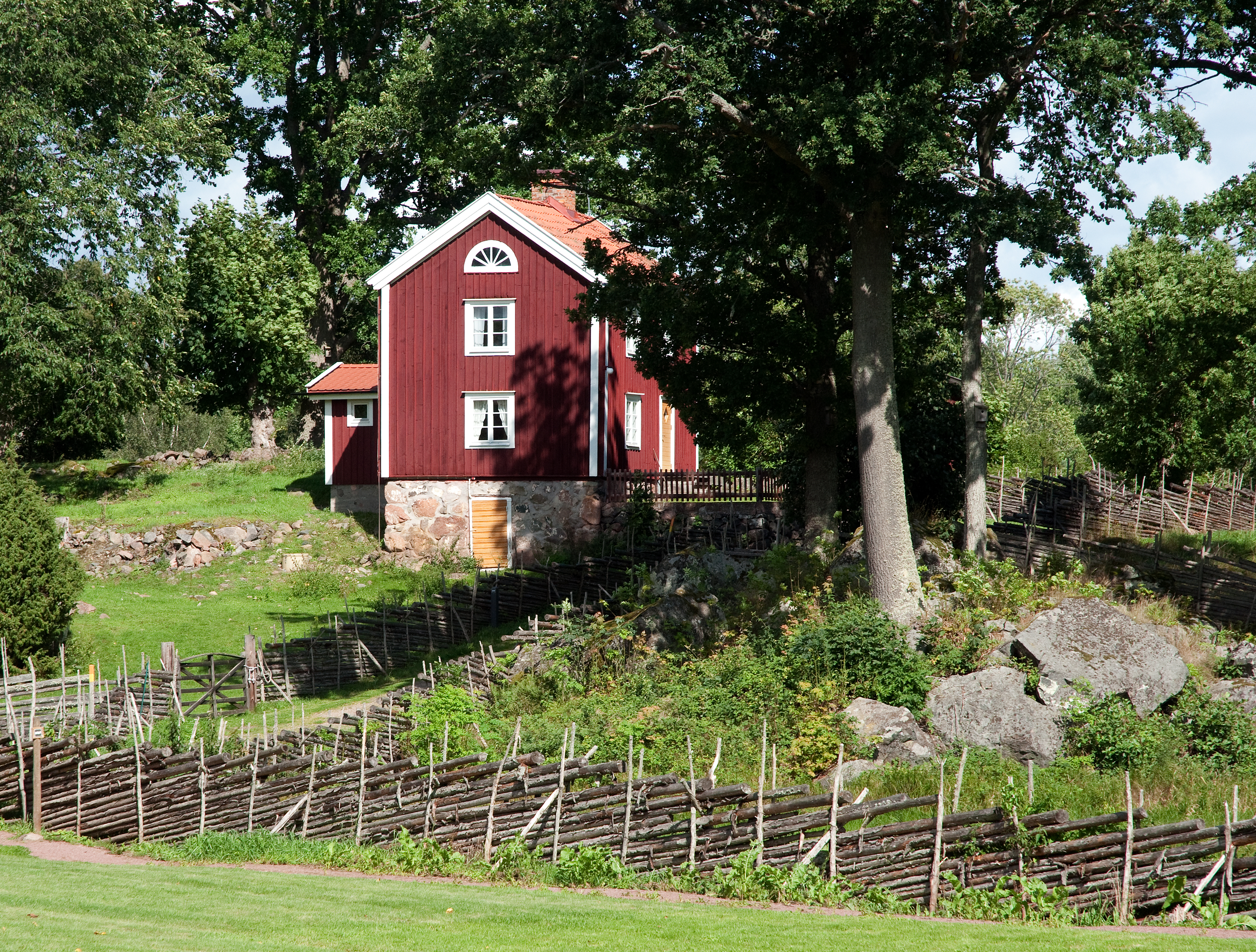
