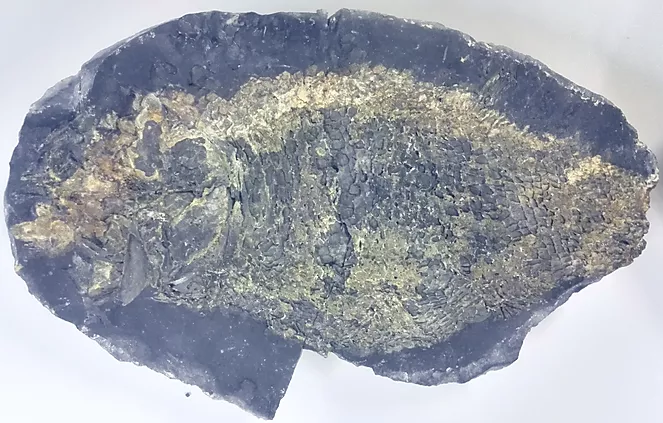
- Candelarialepis from the Candelaria Formation of Nevada, USA

Scientific classification
- Domain: Eukaryota
- Kingdom: Animalia
- Phylum: Chordata
- Class: Actinopterygii
- Order: †Parasemionotiformes
- Family: †Parasemionotidae
- Genus: †Candelarialepis; Romano et al., 2019

Type species
- †Candelarialepis argentus Romano et al., 2019

= Candelarialepis =

Candelarialepis Temporal range: Induan

Extinct genus of fishes

Candelarialepis is an extinct genus of prehistoric marine ray-finned fish that lived during the Induan age of the Early Triassic epoch in what is now Nevada. It contains a single species, C. argentus. It was described from the Candelaria Formation.

== See also ==
- List of prehistoric bony fish
- Paleontology in Nevada
