= Lehmanotus =

Lehmanotus Temporal range: Early Triassic (Induan)

Scientific classification
- Kingdom: Animalia
- Phylum: Chordata
- Class: Actinopterygii
- Order: †Parasemionotiformes
- Family: †Parasemionotidae
- Genus: †Lehmanotus; Beltan, 1968
- Species: †L. markubai

Binomial name
- †Lehmanotus markubai Beltan, 1968

Extinct genus of fishes

Lehmanotus is an extinct genus of prehistoric marine parasemionotid ray-finned fish that lived during the Early Triassic. It contains a single species, L. markubai, known from the Induan of what is now Madagascar. It is named after Jean-Pierre Lehman.

== See also ==
- Prehistoric fish
- List of prehistoric bony fish
