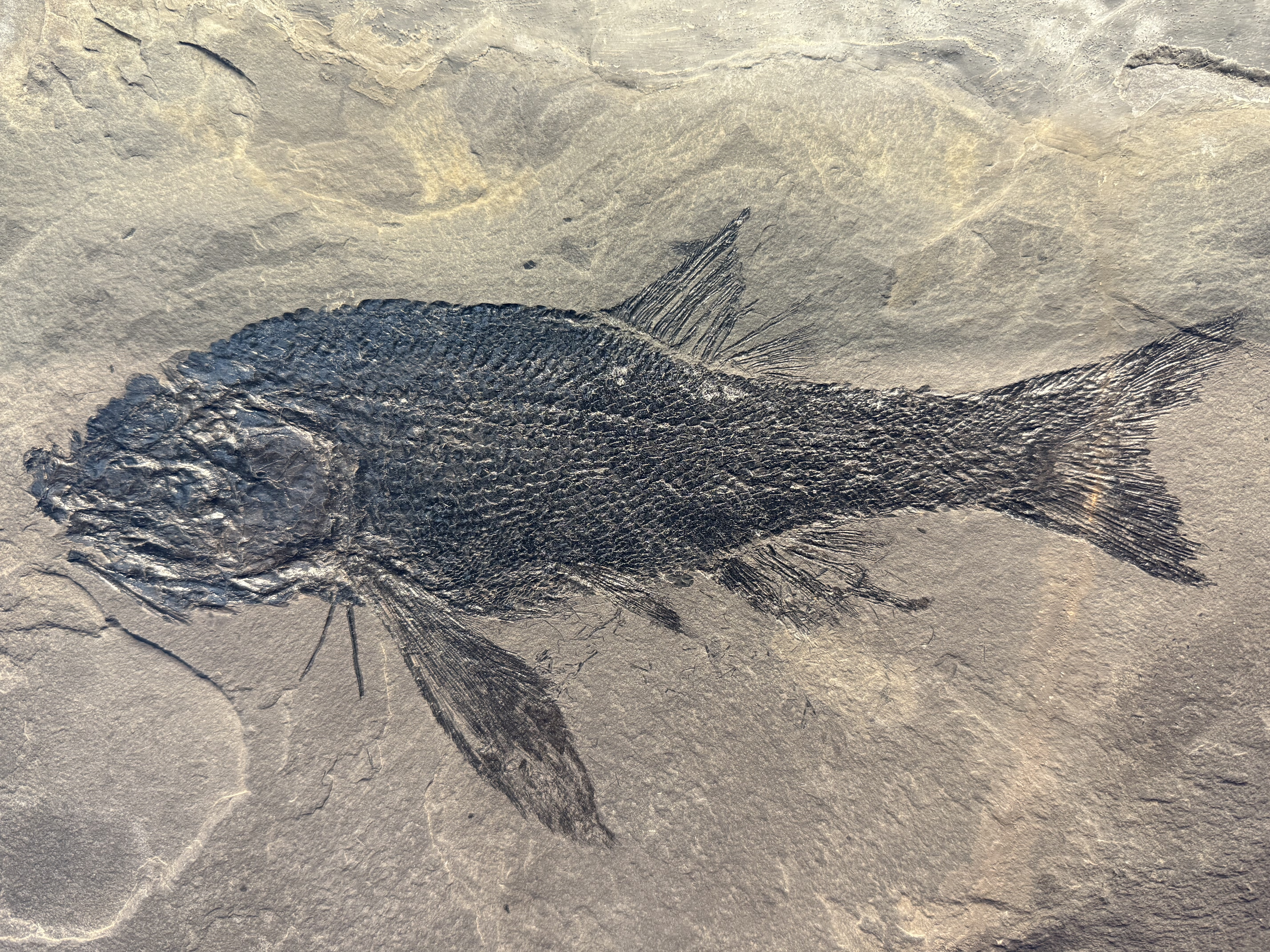
- A. cupidinia from Wapiti Lake (B.C.), on display at the ROM

Scientific classification
- Kingdom: Animalia
- Phylum: Chordata
- Class: Actinopterygii
- Order: †Parasemionotiformes
- Family: †Parasemionotidae
- Genus: †Albertonia; Gardiner, 1966

Type species
- Albertonia cupidinia Lambe, 1916

Synonyms
- Elonichthys cupidineus (Lambe, 1916); Dollopterus cupidineus (Lambe, 1936)

= Albertonia =

Albertonia Temporal range: Early Triassic (Olenekian)

Extinct genus of fishes

Albertonia is an extinct genus of parasemionotid ray-finned fish from the Early Triassic of Alberta and British Columbia, Canada. The most complete material assigned to the genus has been found in the Sulfur Mountain Formation near Wapiti Lake. It was a large member of the family, having a standard length of 250 millimetres (9.8 in). The most notable feature of its anatomy are its very large pectoral fins that are over half the length of the body.

== History ==
The material eventually assigned to Albertonia was first described by Lawrence M. Lambe in 1916. The holotype (NMC 757, 757a), was collected at a railway cut near Banff-Massive, Alberta by L. D. Burling in 1915. The specimen is made up of a trunk section containing most of the body and a portion of the skull. Similar to a number of other earlier actinopterygians, this specimen was assigned to the wastebasket genus Elonichthys resulting in the name Elonichthys cupidinia. Even at the time, Lambe stated that features such as the size of the paired fins disagreed with its placement within the genus. In 1936, Leo S. Berg instead placed the species within the genus Dollopterus based on its large pectoral fins. Similar to Lambe before, Berg also suggests that the fish should potentially be placed in its own genus. This would take place in a 1966 catalog of fossil fishes by Brian G. Gardiner in which the species was placed in Albertonia. A more proper description of the fish with the inclusion of new material was later done by Bobb Schaeffer and Marlyn Mangus in 1976. This new material came from Banff-Massive, the Sulphur Mountain Formation, and Toad-Grayling Formation. The most recent and detailed description of the genus comes from a 1986 thesis by Andrew G. Neuman. In 1997, Graham R. Davies published on a specimen of the fish found in a core sample of the Montney Formation in Alberta.

== Taxonomy ==
In the naming of the genus, Gardiner suggested that Albertonia was a member of Perleididae. This placement was countered by Schaeffer and Magnus in 1976, with them suggesting that the fish should instead be placed within Parasemionotidae. In later papers, such as a 2022 publication by Zhiwei Yuan and coauthors, refer to this placement as "supposed" due to a lack of a formal cladistic analysis.

== Description ==
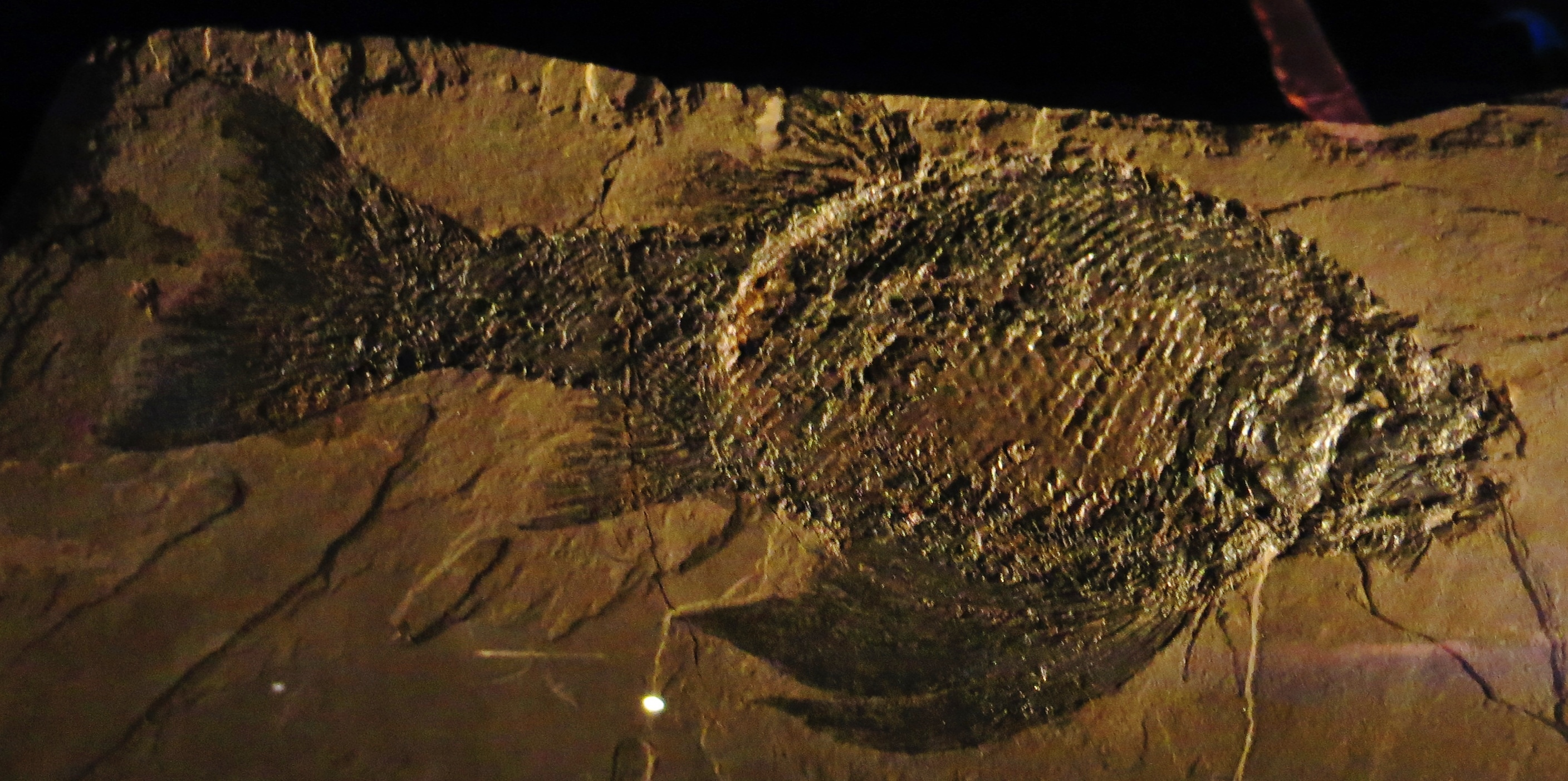
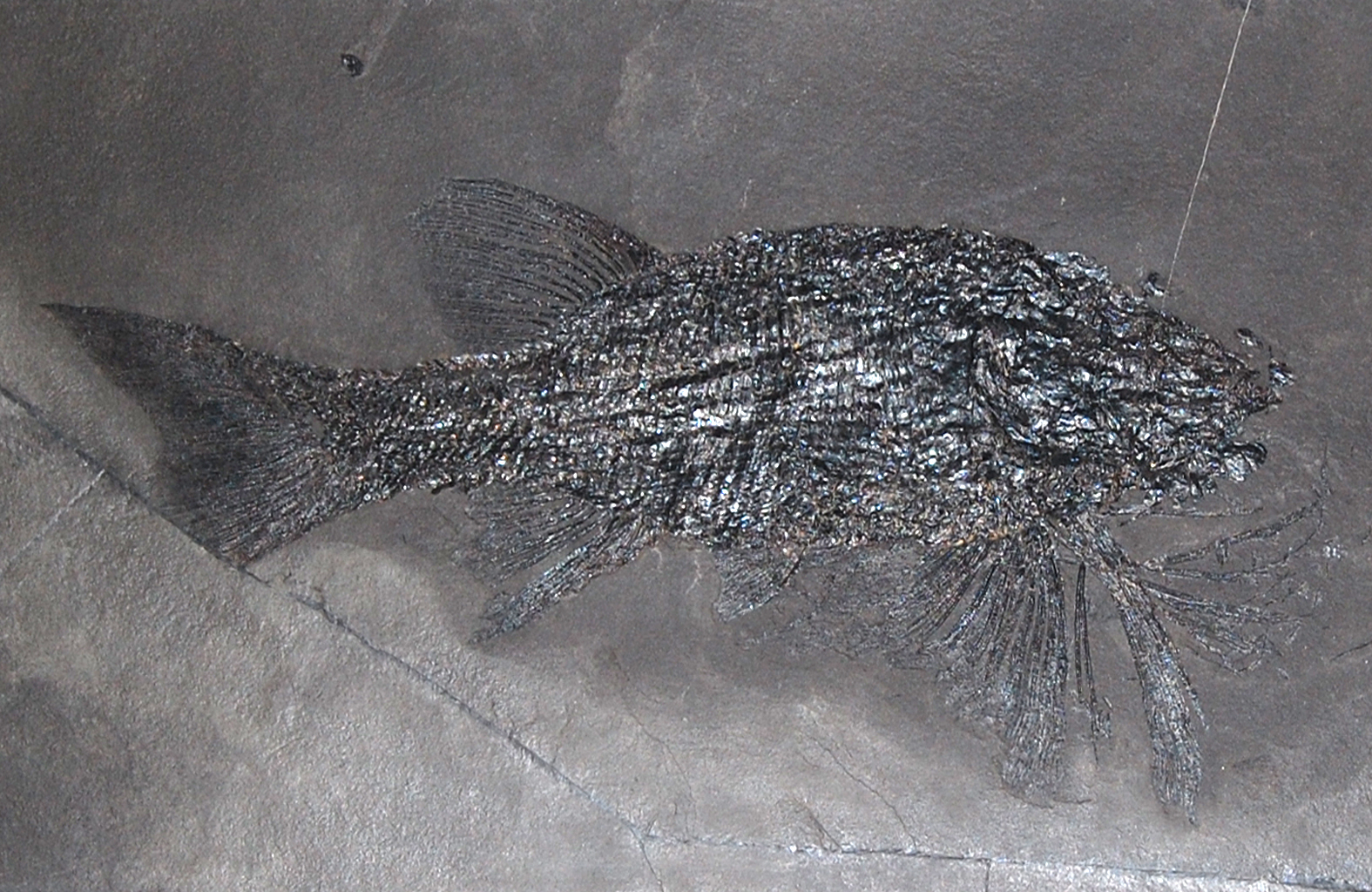

Albertonia is a large, deep-bodied parasemionotid that has a standard length of 200–250 millimetres (7.9–9.8 in) and a maximum depth of 100 millimetres (3.9 in). The deepest portion of the body is located at about the level of the pelvic fins.

=== Skull ===
The skull of the fish is very short and, due to the deep-bodied nature of the fish, is nearly as deep as it is long. Due to the poor preservation of the fossils at the main locality Albertonia is known from, the exact shapes of the bones that make up the skull roof are difficult to determine. Even with this being the case a large amount of ridges and tubercles are seen on these bones. The upper jaw is large, with the maxilla taking up 40% of the skull length. The supramaxilla is located on the dorsal edge of the bone. The bone increases in height until its midpoint, after which it becomes rapidly more shallow. Though present in specimens, the exact shape of the premaxilla is unknown due to it being partially covered by the antorbital. Like other holosteans, the mandible of Albertonia is deep. The dentition on both the top and bottom jaws are generally similar to one another. The top dentition is made up of thirteen fairly large teeth on the premaxilla and a much larger amount of smaller teeth on the maxilla. On the bottom jaw, both the tooth count and size are very similar to those seen on the maxilla. The orbit of Albertonia is located in the anterior region of the skull, similar to other parasemionotids. The ventral and posterior edges of the orbit are made up of a total of four infraorbitals. The posterior-most in the series slightly overlap the anterior-most bone of the opercular series, the preopercle. The dorsal edge of the orbit is made up by two supraorbitals. Both bones are around the same height but the front supraorbital is longer, being more rectangular in shape.

The opercular series of Albertonia makes up a large amount of the skull length with the opercular making up between 40 and 47% of length. The preopercle is not well preserved on any specimens but it was most likely broad like in other members of the family. Also as in other members of the family, the back of the bone is thicker due to the preopercular canal that runs through it. The opercle is a large, deep bone that has a convex anteroventral edge that straightens out. The subopercle, a bone located under the opercle, is smaller and has a projection on the anterodorsal edge. It runs between the preopercle and a portion of the opercle. The interopercle is fairly large though still much smaller than other bones in the opercular series.

=== Postcranium ===
The postcranial anatomy of Albertonia is overall similar to other members of Parasemionotidae. Like in other members of the family, the cleithrum is "C"-shaped though the exact morphology of the other bones of the pectoral girdle is unknown. The large pectoral fins of the fish are the most notable feature of its anatomy, making up around half of the body length of the fish. This length results in the end of the fins reaching to approximately the origin of the anal fin. The pectoral fin is made up of a total of twenty one fin rays. The pelvic fins are much smaller and located close to the anal fin. Each of the fins are made up of twelve to thirteen rays. The dorsal fin inserts just in front of the anal fin and is triangular in shape. It is made up of sixteen to seventeen rays. The anal fin is similar in shape to the dorsal fin and is made up of fifteen to sixteen rays. The caudal fin of Albertonia is hemiheterocercal, having a vertebral column that makes up a small portion of the upper lobe. It is made up of about thirty fin rays.

The scales of Albertonia, like in other parasemionotids, are rhombic with serrations on their posterior edge. Depending on the specimen, there are between forty and forty-two rows of scales between the pectoral girdle and caudal fin of the fish.

== Paleobiology ==
=== Paleoecology ===
Based on the small dentation of Albertonia, it is most likely that the fish was a grazer. Features of the preservation of the fossils such as the lack of floating post-mortem suggest that it swam deeper in the water column with authors even suggesting that it could have lived near the oxygen minimum zone. In these environments, it's likely that the fish was a slow but strong swimmer.

=== Paleoenvironment ===
The Sulfur Mountain Formation, where a majority of specimens of the genus are from, represents a fairly deep marine environment located between 32° and 34° North latitude. The formation was formed within a basin known as the Peace River Embayment. Within it, there was an open shelf marine environment that became more shallow in more eastern areas. The combination of tidal influences and deltas on the coastlines suggest an environment roughly analogous to shallow shelf environments in the Atlantic Ocean along with potentially the Wadden Sea. The surrounding land of what is now Western Canada was regionally arid and contained aeolian dunes. Though arid, the region would have had a megamonsoonal climate with wind direction changes that would result in seasonal reversals. Other ray-finned fish, coelacanths, some of the youngest eugeneodonts, early ichthyosaurs, and thlattosaurs have also been found in the Sulfur Mountain Formation.
