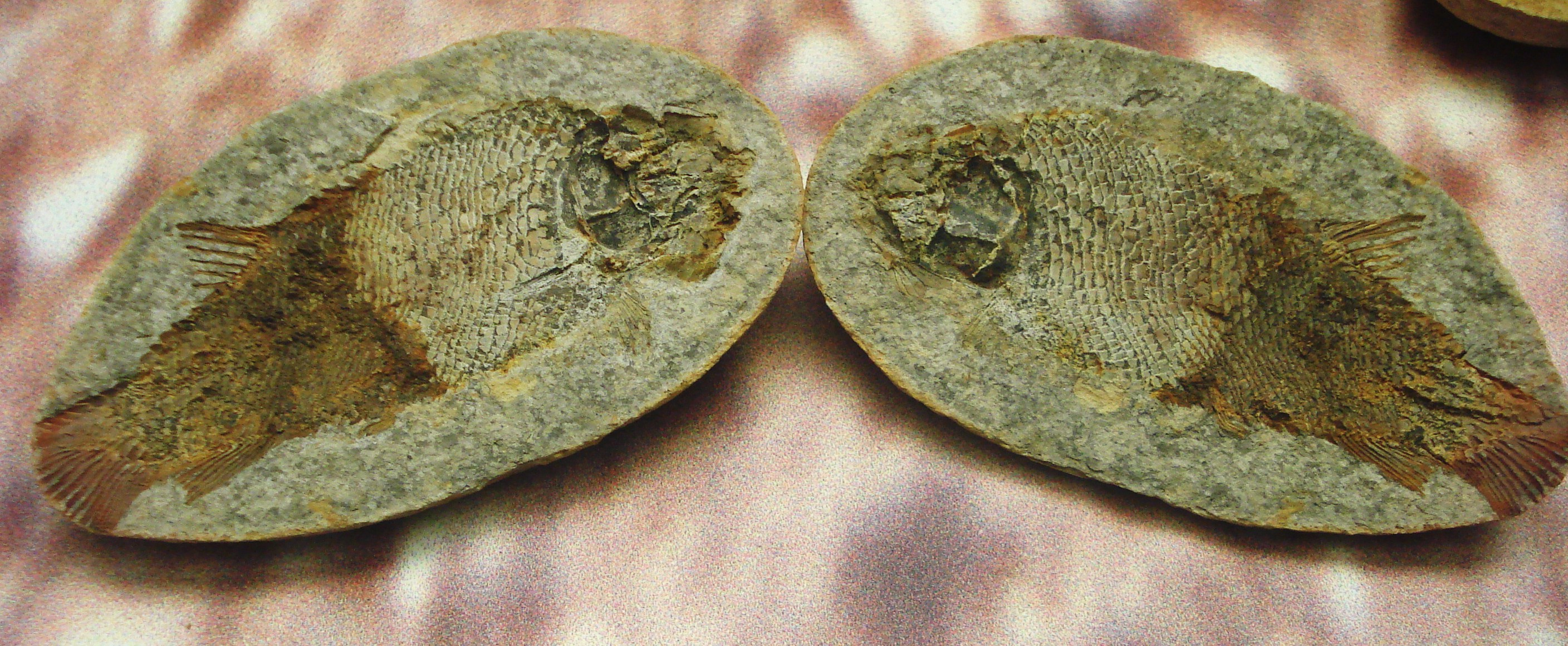
- Parasemionotus from the Sakamena Formation of Madagascar

Scientific classification
- Domain: Eukaryota
- Kingdom: Animalia
- Phylum: Chordata
- Class: Actinopterygii
- Order: †Parasemionotiformes
- Family: †Parasemionotidae
- Genus: †Parasemionotus; Piveteau, 1929

Type species
- †Parasemionotus labordei (Priem, 1924)

= Parasemionotus =

Parasemionotus Temporal range: Induan

Extinct genus of fishes

Parasemionotus is an extinct genus of prehistoric bony fish that lived in the Induan age of the Early Triassic epoch in what is now Madagascar. It is the name giving genus of the family Parasemionotidae and the order Parasemionotiformes.

The type species Parasemionotus labordei was first described under the name Semionotus labordei by Ferdinand Priem. Jean Piveteau later erected the new genus name Parasemionotus for this species. It is not closely related with Semionotus.

== See also ==
- Prehistoric fish
- List of prehistoric bony fish
