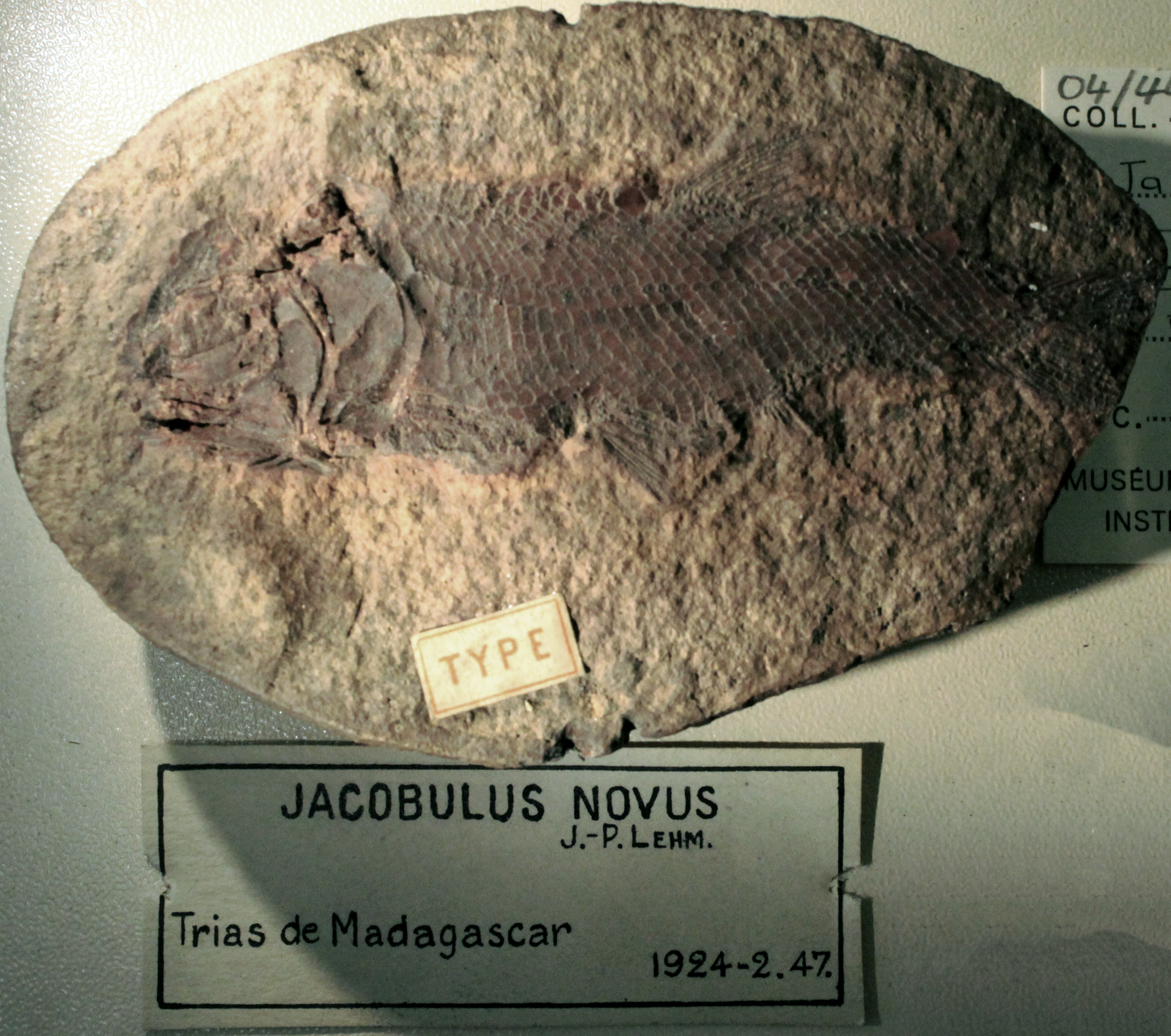
- Jacobulus novus type

Scientific classification
- Kingdom: Animalia
- Phylum: Chordata
- Class: Actinopterygii
- Order: †Parasemionotiformes
- Family: †Parasemionotidae
- Genus: †Jacobulus; Lehman, 1952
- Species: †J. novus

Binomial name
- †Jacobulus novus Lehman, 1952

= Jacobulus =

Jacobulus Temporal range: Early Triassic (Olenekian)

Extinct genus of fishes

Jacobulus is an extinct genus of prehistoric marine ray-finned fish that lived during the Early Triassic epoch. It contains a single species, J. novus, known from what is now northern Madagascar during the Olenekian stage. It was a small fish less than 10 centimetres (3.9 in) in length. and appears to have been a grazer-detritivore.

== See also ==
- Prehistoric fish
- List of prehistoric bony fish
