= Jean Piveteau =

French scientist (1899–1991)

- Born: 23 September 1899; Rouillac
- Died: 7 March 1991 (aged 91); Paris
- Occupation: Palaeontologist

Jean Piveteau (23 September 1899 – 7 March 1991) was a distinguished French vertebrate paleontologist. He was elected to the French Academy of Sciences in 1956 and served as the institute's president in 1973.

== Legacy ==
Two genera of Triassic fish, the actinopterygian Piveteaunotus and the actinistian Piveteauia, and a genus of Middle Jurassic theropod dinosaur, Piveteausaurus, are named in his honor.
