= Induan =

First age of the Early Triassic epoch

- 251.902 ± 0.024 – 249.9 Ma
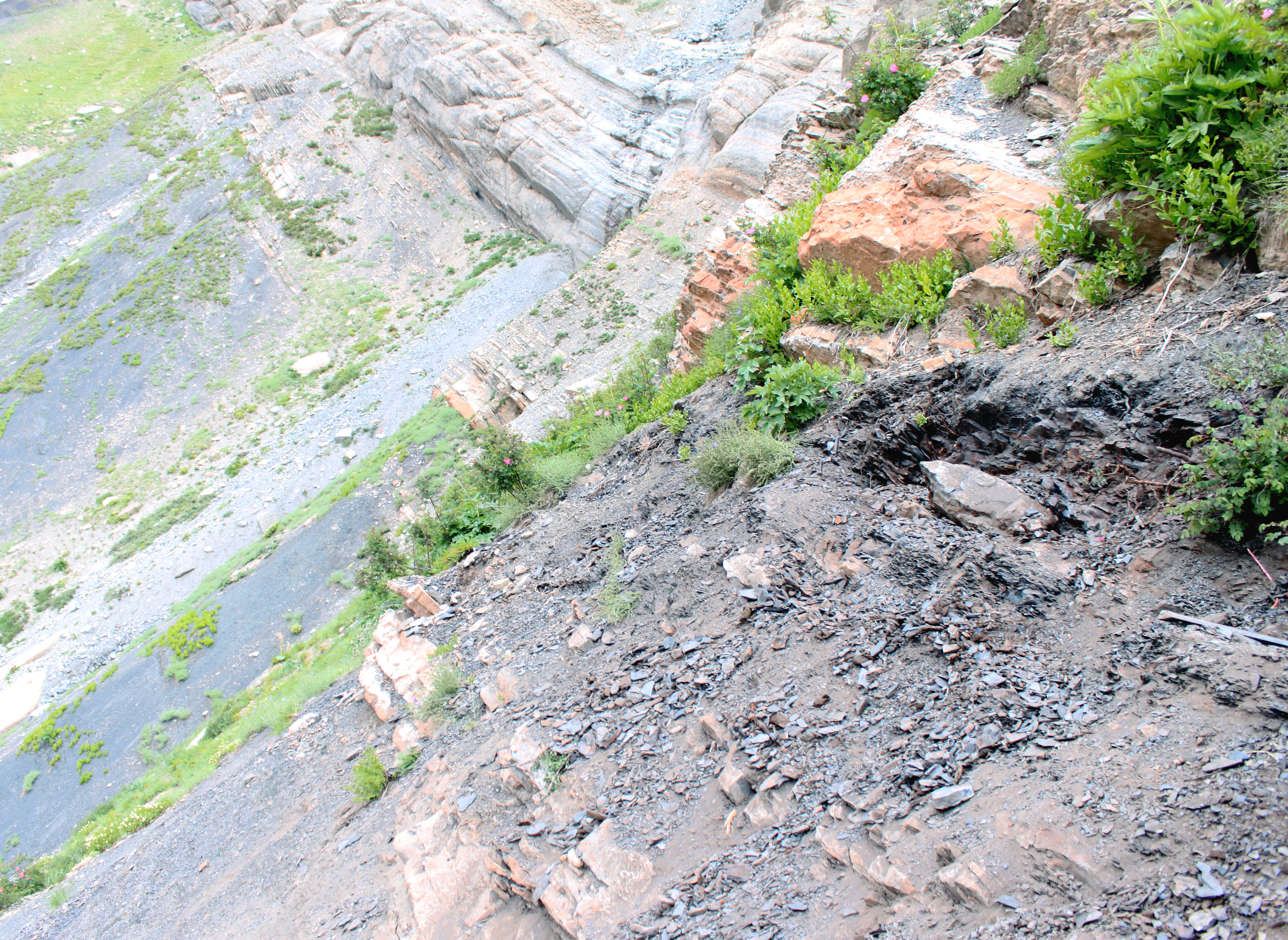
- Induan aged rock layers of the Mikin Formation (Lahaul and Spiti district, India)

Chronology
← / Triassic–Jurassic extinction event; ← / Scleractinian corals & calcified sponges; ← / Carnian pluvial episode; ← / Manicouagan impact; ← / Coals return; ← / Full recovery of woody trees; ← / Smithian–Spathian boundary event; ← / Permian-Triassic extinction event
Subdivision of the Triassic according to the ICS, as of 2024. Vertical axis scale: Millions of years ago

Etymology
- Name formality: Formal

Usage information
- Celestial body: Earth
- Regional usage: Global (ICS)
- Time scale(s) used: ICS Time Scale

Definition
- Chronological unit: Age
- Stratigraphic unit: Stage
- Time span formality: Formal
- Lower boundary definition: FAD of the Conodont Hindeodus parvus
- Lower boundary GSSP: Meishan, Zhejiang, China; 31.0798°N 119.7058°E
- Lower GSSP ratified: 2001
- Upper boundary definition: Not formally defined
- Upper boundary definition candidates: FAD of the Conodont Neospathodus waageni
- Upper boundary GSSP candidate section(s): Mud (Muth) village, Spiti valley, India

The Induan is the first age of the Early Triassic epoch in the geologic timescale, or the lowest stage of the Lower Triassic series in chronostratigraphy. It spans the time between 251.902 Ma and 249.9 Ma (million years ago). The Induan is sometimes divided into the Griesbachian and the Dienerian subages or substages. The Induan is preceded by the Changhsingian (latest Permian) and is followed by the Olenekian.

The Induan is roughly coeval with the regional Feixianguanian Stage of China.

== Geology ==
=== Stratigraphy ===
The Triassic is the first period of the Mesozoic era. It is subdivided into the Lower, Middle, and Upper Triassic series, which are further subdivided into stages. The Induan is the first stage of the Lower Triassic, from 251.9 million to 249.9 million years ago, spanning the first 2 million years after the Permian–Triassic extinction event.

Stages can be defined globally or regionally. For global stratigraphic correlation, the International Commission on Stratigraphy (ICS) ratifies global stages based on a Global Boundary Stratotype Section and Point (GSSP) from a single formation (a stratotype) identifying the lower boundary of the stage. The GSSP for the Induan is defined as the bottom of Bed 27c of the Meishan Section, China, 31°4′47.28″N 119°42′20.9″E, with the appearance of the conodont Hindeodus parvus as its primary marker (biostratigraphy), and minimum zones (negative anomalies) of ^{13}C and ^{18}O (corresponding to the extinction event) as its secondary marker. Bed 27c comprises a medium-bedded section of limestone, overlain by clay and a medium-bedded section of dolomitic, argillaceous calcimicrite. Calcimicrite is a type of limestone that contains more micrite than allochem, and the diameter of any particle measures less than 20 microns.

The Induan is succeeded by the Olenekian, whose GSSP is defined at the bottom of Bed A-2 of the Mikin Formation near Mud village, Spiti, India, with the appearance of the conodont Neospathodus waageni and a ^{13}C peak.

=== History ===
There have been several propositions for the organization of the Triassic timescale. Most of the Triassic stages and sub-stages, which are still used today, were coined in an 1895 publication by Austro-Hungarian geologist Johann August Georg Edmund Mojsisovics von Mojsvar, Austrian geologist Carl Diener, and German geologist Wilhelm Heinrich Waagen. They were defined using ammonite research conducted in large part by Mojsisovics and Diener in primarily Austria, Italy, and Bosnia; as well as Waagen's work in the Pakistani Salt Range. They divided the Triassic into four series (from lowest to highest): the Scythian, Dinaric, Tyrolean, and Bavarian. The Scythian was divided (from lowest to highest) into the Brahmanian and Jakutian stages. The Brahmanian's lower boundary was defined by the appearance of the ammonite Otoceras woodwardi in the Himalayas (Austrian paleontologist Carl Ludolf Griesbach had already proposed this ammonite demarcate the beginning of the Triassic in 1880), and its upper boundary by a section of sandstone in the Salt Range characterized by ceratite ammonites.

In 1956, Soviet paleontologists Lubov D. Kiparisova and Yurij N. Popov decided to divide the Lower Triassic series into, what they coined, the Induan and Olenekian stages. The Induan honors the Indus River, as they also bounded it using the same criteria and sites as Mojsisovics' Brahmanian in the Indus region, though they resided in Siberia at the time. That is, the Induan is synonymous with the Brahmanian.

In the 1960s, English paleontologist Edward T. Tozer (sometimes collaborating with American geologist Norman J. Silberling) crafted Triassic timescales based on North American ammonoid zones (further refining it in the following decades), based on the works of Frank McLearn in British Columbia and Siemon Muller in Nevada who pieced together the ammonoid fossil record of the North American Cordillera. Tozer's nomenclature was largely derived from Mojsisovics's work, but he redefined them using North American sites. He recommended the Lower Triassic series be divided into the: Griesbachian, Dienerian, Smithian, and Spathian. The former two roughly correspond with the Induan. Tozer's timescale became popular in the Americas. He named the Griesbachian after Griesbach Creek on Axel Heiberg Island, Canada, and further split it into the Gangetian and Ellesmarian substages; the former he defined by the ammonite zones of O. concavum and O. boreale, and the latter by Ophiceras commune and Proptychites striatus. He named the Dienerian after Diener Creek on Ellesmere Island, Canada, and defined it by the ammonite zones P. candus and Vavilovites sverdrupi.

In the 1970s, the ICS was founded to globally standardize stratigraphy. They erected the Subcommission on Triassic Stratigraphy (STS), which published its first timescale to Triassic stratigraphy in 1985. They divided it into the Lower, Middle, and Upper series; the Lower Triassic divided into the Induan and Olenekian stages; and the Induan further divided into the Griesbachian and Dienerian substages. In a revised 1991 timescale, they dropped several more of Tozer's considerations, and likewise did away with Induan substages entirely, though Tozer's original definition of them are still in use in ammonoid research.

In the 1990s, detailed studies of Otoceras sites in Tibet, Kashmir, Himalayas, Greenland, Svalbard and the Arctic territories of North America have revealed the problematic interval of existence of this genus. By the same decade, most geologists had moved away from ammonite zones, preferring conodonts. Consequently, in 1996, the STS moved the Induan's GSSP to Meishan, China, with the appearance of H. parvus. It was the first GSSP approved by the STS.

=== Coal gap ===
Coal is formed when plant matter decays into peat, which is then buried and subjected to heat and pressure over a long time. Following the Permian extinction, there is a conspicuous lack of coal seams dating to the Early Triassic, and only a few thin ones have been identified dating to the Middle Triassic. The apparent marginalization of peat-producing plants has variously been explained to be a consequence of: high global elevation, excess acidity due to volcanic sulfur dioxide emissions or nitrous oxides from bolide (meteor) impact, the transition from an icehouse to a greenhouse Earth (the melting of the poles and surging global temperatures), excess plant predation by herbivores (insects or tetrapods) which evolved more efficient eating strategies (though they were quite diverse before even the Permian), or mass die-off of peat-producing plants.

== Paleogeography ==
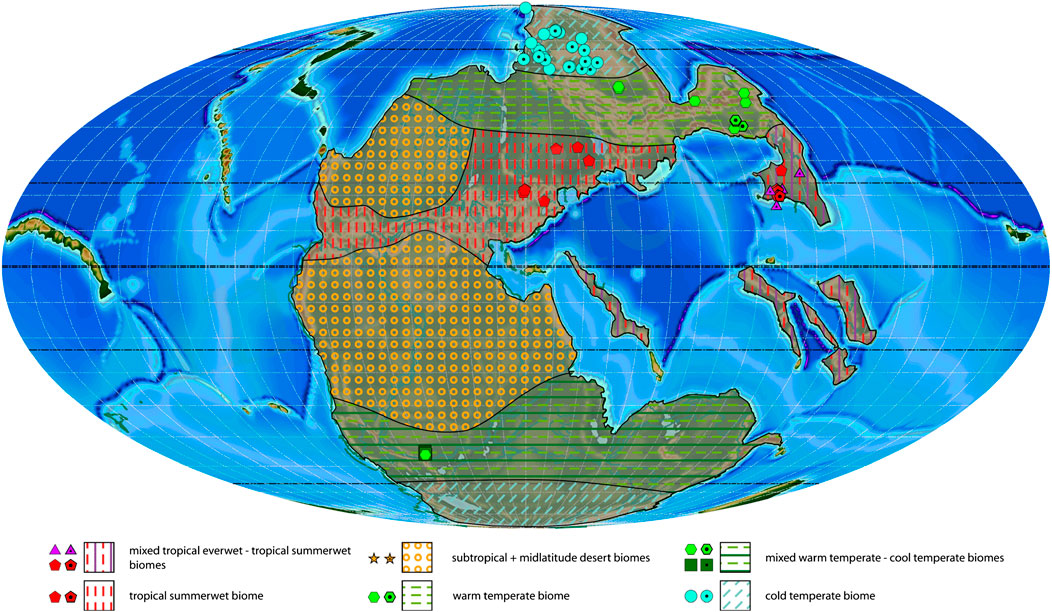
Paleoclimatic reconstruction of Pangea during the Induan

During the Induan, all major landmasses had already amalgamated into the supercontinent Pangea, the northern portion referred to as Laurasia, and the southern portion Gondwana. At this point in time, Antarctica was near but not on the South Pole. Eastern Gondwana lay south of 60°S, and the western part north.

A major rifting zone existed on Madagascar, which was wedged in between the African and the Indian Plate, gradually pushing them apart. This action would eventually expand the newly forming Neo-Tethys Ocean at the expense of the Paleo-Tethys Ocean. Behind the burgeoning Neo-Tethys lay a major rift pushing India away from western Australia, which promulgated volcanoes across the area. During the Permian extinction, this volcanic activity created the Panjal Traps. In eastern Australia, the Hunter-Bowen orogeny and related magmatic activity was shutting down. The fold belts from this event, as well as the first phase of those at Cape Fold Belt in what is now the South African coast, were being degraded by the Gondwanide orogeny.

== Induan life ==
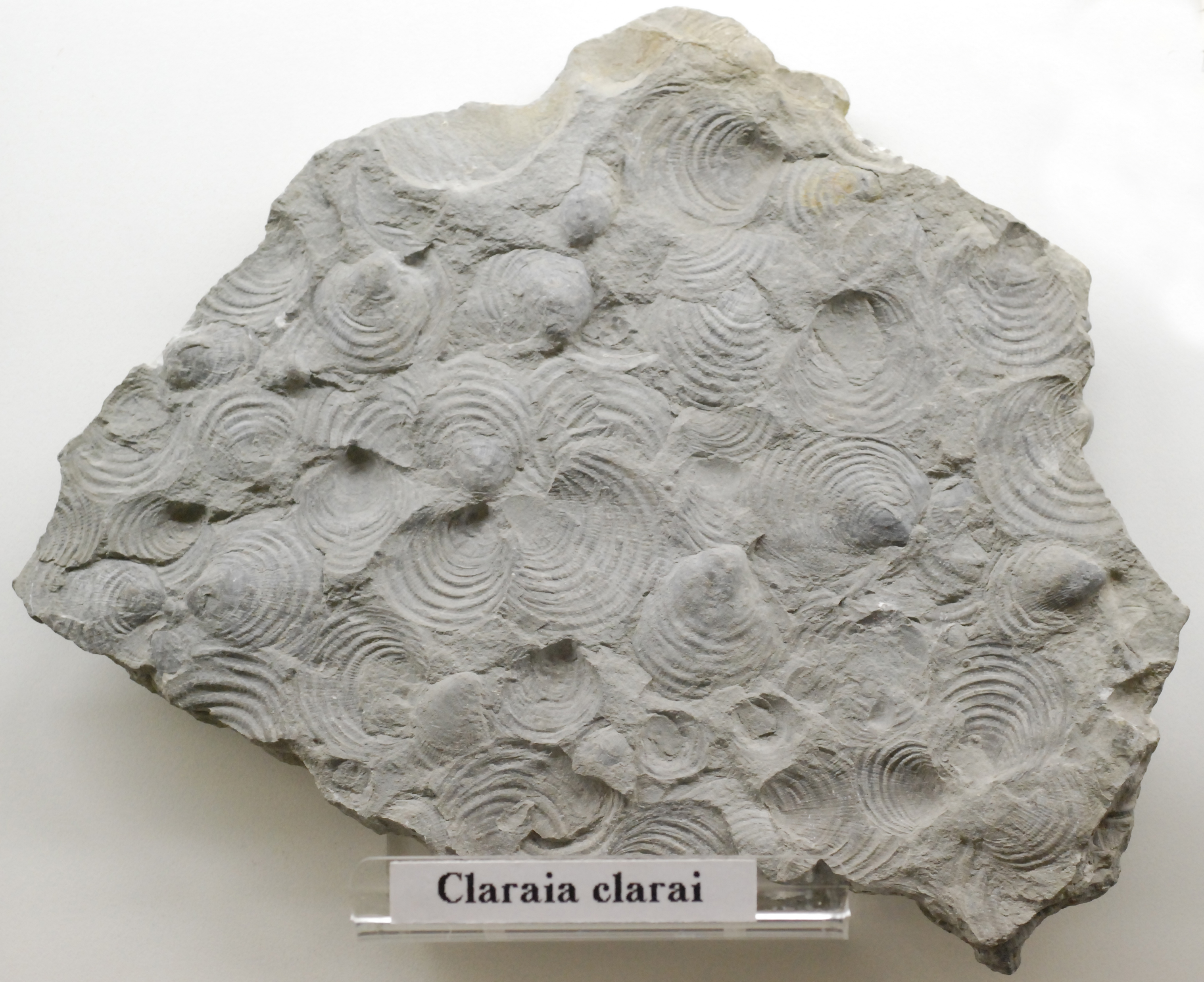
Fossils of Claraia clarai

The Induan followed the mass extinction event at the end of the Permian period, and historically, it was thought recovery was delayed by as much as five million years to the Middle Triassic. The 21st century discoveries of diverse arrays of conodonts, ammonoids, bivalves, benthic foraminifera, and other ichnotaxa suggest that recovery instead took under 1.5 million years. Marine black shale deposits are common especially in the Dienerian substage of the Induan. These point to low oxygenation in the ocean. The discovery of the Induan aged Guiyang biota shows that at least some locations hosted reasonably complex ecosystems.

Much of the supercontinent Pangea remained almost lifeless, deserted, hot, and dry. Both global biodiversity and community-level (alpha) diversity remained low through much of the Induan. In higher latitudes, the flora during the Griesbachian was gymnosperm dominated but became lycopod dominated (e.g. Pleuromeia) in the Dienerian. This change reflects a shift in global climate from cool and dry in the Griesbachian to hot and humid in the Dienerian and points to an extinction event during the Induan, c. 500,000 years after the end-Permian mass extinction event. It led to the extinction of the Permian Glossopteris flora.

The lystrosaurids and the proterosuchids were the only groups of land animals to dominate during the Induan Stage. Other animals, such as the ammonoids, insects, and the tetrapods (cynodonts, amphibians, reptiles, etc.) remained rare and terrestrial ecosystems did not recover for some 30 million years. Both the seas and much of the freshwater during the Induan were anoxic, predominantly during the Dienerian subage. Microbial reefs were common, possibly due to lack of competition with metazoan reef builders as a result of the extinction.

Regarding bony fish, ray-finned fishes remained largely unaffected by the Permian-Triassic extinction event and coelacanths exhibit their highest post-Devonian diversity during the Early Triassic. Many genera show a cosmopolitan distribution during the Induan and Olenekian (e.g. Australosomus, Birgeria, Bobasatrania, Parasemionotidae, Pteronisculus, Ptycholepidae, Saurichthys, Whiteia). This is well exemplified in the Griesbachian aged fish assemblages of the Wordie Creek Formation (East Greenland), the Dienerian aged assemblages of the Middle Sakamena Formation (Madagascar), Candelaria Formation (Nevada, United States), Mikin Formation (Himachal Pradesh, India), and Daye Formation (Guizhou, China), the Smithian (Olenekian) aged assemblages of the Vikinghøgda Formation (Spitsbergen, Norway), and Thaynes Group (western United States), the Spathian aged Helongshan Formation (Anhui, China), and several Early Triassic layers of the Sulphur Mountain Formation (western Canada).

Induan chondrichthyan fishes include hybodonts, neoselachians, ctenacanths, and a few surviving lineages of eugeneodontid holocephalians, the latter two being mainly Palaeozoic groups. Cartilaginous fishes were seemingly rare during the Induan.

Crocodile-shaped, marine temnospondyl amphibians (e.g. Aphaneramma, Wantzosaurus) were geographically widespread during the Induan and Olenekian ages. Their fossils are found in Greenland, Spitsbergen, Pakistan and Madagascar.

The bivalve Claraia was widespread and common in the Panthalassa and Tethys oceans. The geologically oldest oysters (Liostrea) are known from the Induan. They grew on the shells of living ammonoids.

== Notable formations ==
- Candelaria Formation (Nevada, USA)
- Daye Formation (Guizhou, China)
- Dinwoody Formation (western USA)
- upper Guodikeng Formation (Xinjiang, China)
- lower Jiucaiyuan Formation (Xinjiang, China)
- middle Sakamena Formation (Madagascar)
- Vardebukta Formation (Svalbard, Norway)
- Werfen Formation (Austria, Bosnia and Herzegovina, Italy)
- Wordie Creek Formation (Greenland)

== See also ==
- Geologic time scale – System that relates geologic strata to time

== Sources ==
- Brack, P.; Rieber, H.; Nicora, A. & Mundil, R.; 2005: The Global boundary Stratotype Section and Point (GSSP) of the Ladinian Stage (Middle Triassic) at Bagolino (Southern Alps, Northern Italy) and its implications for the Triassic time scale, Episodes 28(4), pp. 233–244.
- Gradstein, F. M.; Ogg, J. G. & Smith, A. G.; 2004: A Geologic Time Scale 2004, Cambridge University Press.
- Kiparisova, Lubov Dmitrievna & Popov, Yurij Nikolaivitch; 1956: Расчленение нижнего отдела триасовой системы на ярусы (Subdivision of the lower series of the Triassic System into stages), Doklady Akademii Nauk SSSR 109(4), pp 842–845 (in Russian).
