= Aesopichthys =

Aesopichthys Temporal range: Late Serpukhovian (Namurian E2b), 324 Ma

Scientific classification
- Kingdom: Animalia
- Phylum: Chordata
- Class: Actinopterygii
- Family: †Aesopichthyidae
- Genus: †Aesopichthys; Poplin & Lund, 2000
- Species: †A. erinaceus

Binomial name
- †Aesopichthys erinaceus Poplin & Lund, 2000

Extinct genus of fishes

Aesopichthys ("Aesop fish") is an extinct genus of palaeoniscoid ray-finned fish from North America. Its fossils are currently only known from the Bear Gulch Limestone located in central Montana which dates to the late Mississippian, also known as the Serpukhovian. It was a deep-bodied member of the group, though not to the extent of what is seen in genera like Platysomus. It possessed a short, blunt snout along with partially-webbed fins. There is only a single species in the genus being A. erinaceus.

== History and naming ==
Aesopichthys is known from a number of specimens with the holotype, CM 48550, being a natural cast and its counterpart found southwest of Becket, Montana. The animal was originally described, along with Proceramala, in 2000 by Cécile Poplin and Richard Lund though in previous papers it was referred under the nickname "Aesopich". The name Aesopichthys derives from Ancient Greek and translates to "Aesop fish" in reference to the hump the fish shares with the Greek fabulist, Aesop. The species name on the other hand, "erinaceus", derives from Ancient Latin and refers to the spikes on the fish's head and shoulder girdle that are reminiscent to those seen in hedgehogs.

== Description ==
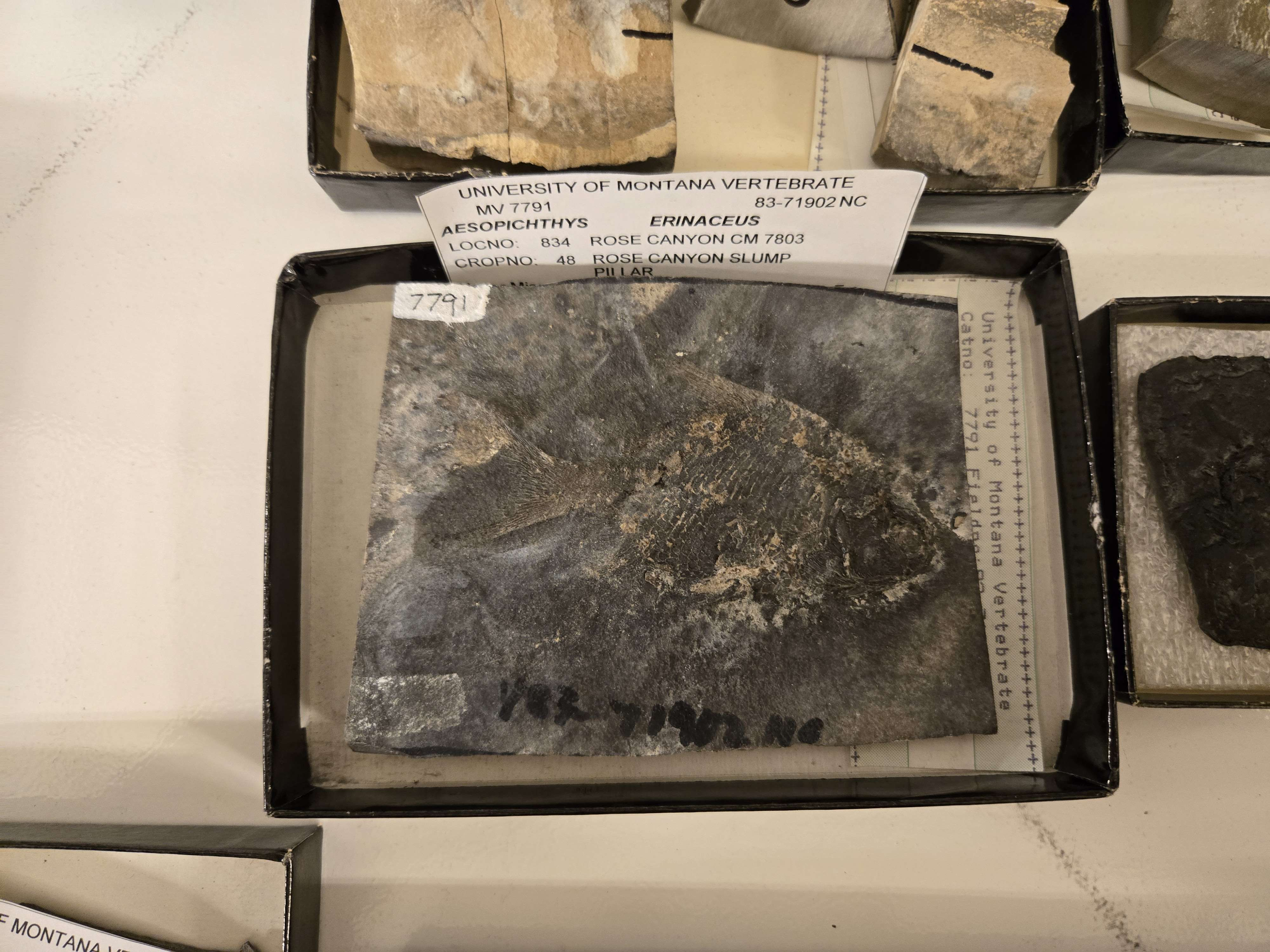
Specimen of Aesopichthys erinaceus from the Bear Gulch Limestone of Montana

=== Skull ===
Aesopichthys had a short skull with a blunt, high snout; there is only a notch for the anterior naris present in the nasals with there not being one present for the posterior naris. This nasal bone also forms the front half of the orbit, while being in contact with the dermosphenotic, frontal, and third infraorbital. The premaxille do not meet at the midline of the skull, rather being loosely below the antorbitals. The bones that make out the snout are loosely attached due to the presence of a rostral notch along with gaps in multiple places of the snout. These features increased the flexibility of the skull and is similar to what is seen between Aesopichthys' suborbitals and preoperculum. Just like in other deep-bodied fish, its tall preoperculum is upright. The mouth is near the bottom of the head and has its gape reduced due to the fish's mandibular coronoid process that only reaches to the back of the orbit. A single row of small teeth are present on the animal's premaxilla, maxilla, and dentary.

Due to the fact that the skull roof has not been observed in its entirety, it has been suggested that it rose in a similar way to the shape of the body. The supraorbital of the canal enters the parietal by going through the frontal; this bone then goes into the short anterior pit line. This pit line, along with the transverse pit line, is short though the posterior pit line is long and is directed towards the dermopterotic. The infraorbital canal passes through this bone though it does not enter the dermosphenotic, instead entering the later extrascapular, which causes the bone to be anamestic. Backward-facing tubercles are present in multiple areas of the skull roof along with others seen on the first infraorbital and extrascapulars. The braincase of Aesopichthys is short with the postorbital process being much more ossified than the other areas and is overlapped by the third infraorbital.

=== Postcrania ===
The pectoral girdle of Aesopichthys lacks specialized postcleithral scales and has a tall, broad ventral limb. It processes two pairs of extrascapulars with a wide lateral one and a thick, rounded medium one. There are backwards projecting spikes on the posterior lamina of the lateral extrascapular. The presupracleithrum is preserved incompletely in specimens though most likely makes contact of the neurocranium.

One of the most notable features of Aesopichthys is the hump that reaches its full height right before the dorsal fin, only for the body to slope back downwards until the base of the caudal fin. The dorsal fin is made up of an average of 51 rays with rays 13-15 being almost the length of the entire fin base. These rays form a deep, downwards curve after the longest rays, only to increase in height once again towards in end of the dorsal fin. At the back of the dorsal fin, the rays radiate from a fine-scaled lobe and decrease in density overall. The top of the caudal fin is made up of a scaled lobe like other palaeoniscoids which is extends past the last fin ray and is erected at between a 27° and 30° angle to the axis of the body, the average number of rays of this fin is 26.8. All rays of the fin are finely segmented with the leading rays of the ventral lobe having fringing fulcra present and are more closely packed than the tapering rays that make up the lower part. In both of the caudal and dorsal fins, these more well-spaced areas are more flexible than the tightly-packed regions. The anal fin of Aesopichthys is triangular in shape and is made up of an average of 18.5 rays with all but the first 2-3 being articulated. Most of the rays behind these are tightly packed with the last 5-6 being more spaced out.

The pectoral fins of Aesopichthys are made up of up to 14 well-spaced rays supported by a fine-scaled lobe. The space between these rays suggests an extensive inter-ray membrane being present. The pelvic fins are located at the mid-abdominal region of the body and is made up of an average of 12.4 long, strong rays with fine fulcra. The total body size of the largest specimen of Aesopichthys 9 cm (3.54 in).

== Classification ==
In the original description of the genus, it was suggested to be a palaeoniscimorph due to the presence of features such as a more anteriorly-placed orbit and maxilla with a postorbital plate, though showing much deeper cheeks than other members of the group. Shown below is the phylogenetic tree in the description, showing the relationships between Aesopichthyidae and "Rhadinichthyid group" fish.

- - outgroup
  - - Cheirolepis
    - - Platysomus
      - - Proceramala
        - Aesopichthys
        - - Cyranorhis
          - - Rhadinichthyidae
            - - Wendyichthys dicksoni
              - Wendyichthys lautreci

Since the description, Aesopichthys has appeared in the phylogenies of other papers, such as in Ren & Guang-Hui (2021), which place the animal near other genera such as Kalops and Cosmoptychius due to traits such as the presence of jointed radials that support the pectoral fins and the lobe seen in the caudal fin. Shown below is the phylogeny from said paper.

- Actinopterygii
  - Cheirolepis
  - - Raynerius
    - - - Howqualepis
        - - Mimipiscis
          - - Osorioichthys
            - Moythomasia
      - - Kentuckia
        - - - Amphicentrum
            - - Fouldenia
              - Styracopterus
          - - Melanecta
            - - Woodichthys
              - - - - Cyranorhis
                    - Pteronisculus
                  - - Boreosomus
                    - - Mesopoma
                      - - Cosmoptychius
                        - - Beagiascus
                          - - Aesopichthys
                            - Kalops
                - - Australosomus
                  - - Cladistia
                    - Actinopteri

== Paleobiology ==
=== Locomotion ===
Aesopichthys was most likely adapted to move through complex environments due to the anatomy of its fins, mostly due to the two distinct parts seen in their morphology. The more tightly-packed areas of the dorsal fin would have helped to stabilized the body during turns while the more wide-spaced areas would have allowed the fish maneuver more easily.

=== Feeding ===
Though comparable to rhadinichthyids, the feeding mechanism was much more specialized in many ways. The presence of thick ganoine ridges would have contributed to the strengthening of the notch on the antorbital. Along with this, due to the lack of firm attachment points with other bones, this bone along with the premaxilla were mobile. The extremely deep maxilla had a large amount of shearing area and has ganione ridges, that along with corresponding ridges on the inner surface, suggests the origin the adductor mandibularis musculature may have when to the front of the maxilla rather than the cheek bones. Its sharp teeth would have been able to occlude simultaneously when the mouth closed. When the mouth was closed, it is possible for the notch in the rostrum to have been able to suction in small particles. These features along with a small gape and vertical suspensorium suggest that Aesopichthys had an extremely strong bite that would have closed rapidly. Along with this, the deep maxilla would have potentially allowed for the increase in volume of the buccal cone.

Due to this large amount of specializations, it is most likely that Aesopichthys would have been chasing after invertebrates and larval fish in the near-shore environment the fish has been found in. With the amount specializations the teeth have, it is possible that Aesopichthys would have browsed on organisms such as algae and bryozoans.

== Paleoenvironment ==
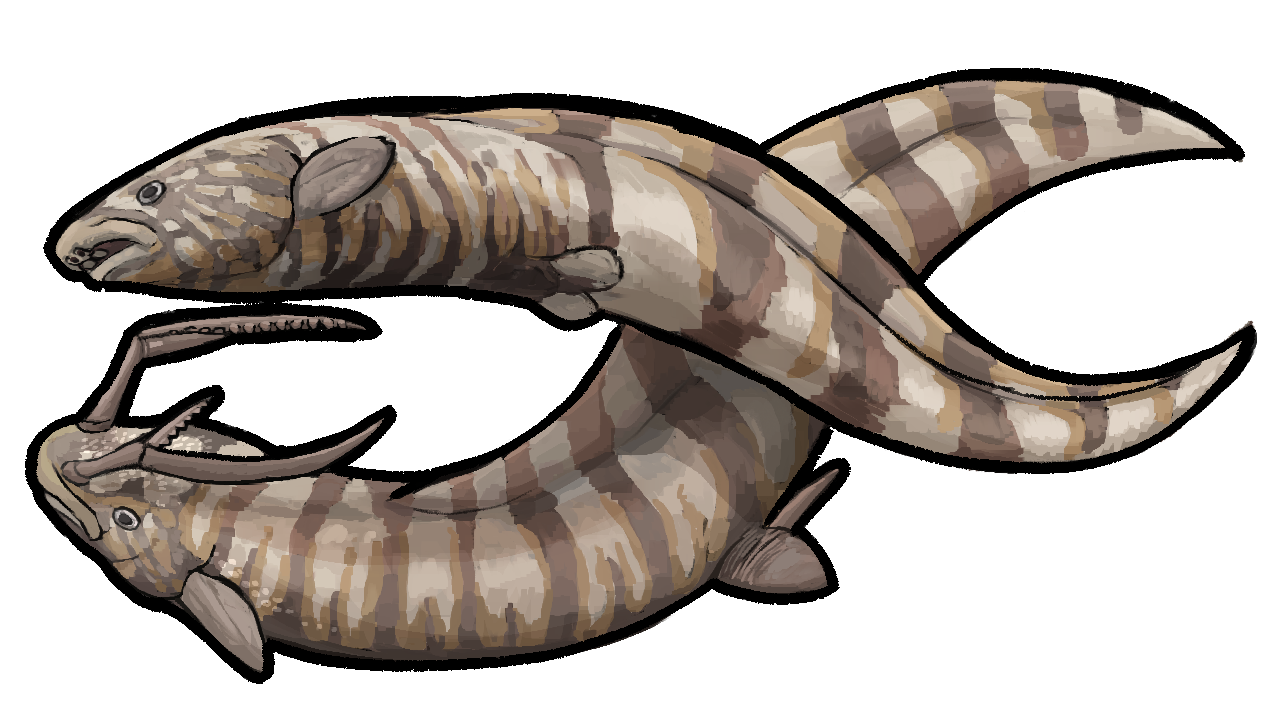
Harpagofututor, a member of the Bear Gulch fauna

The Bear Gulch Limestone as a whole is a near-shore environment positioned between the latitudes of 10° and 12° north of the equator. The area had a seasonal climate that would move between tropical and semi-arid conditions. While the environment has a high amount of vertebrate diversity including Chondrichthyans like Harpagofututor and Falcatus along with the early coelacanth Allenypterus. However, the invertebrate diversity of Bear Gulch is not as well understood with one of the few examples being the strange potential mollusk Typhloesus. Aesopichthys itself was specifically found in sediments associated with a high amounts of sponges and algae.
