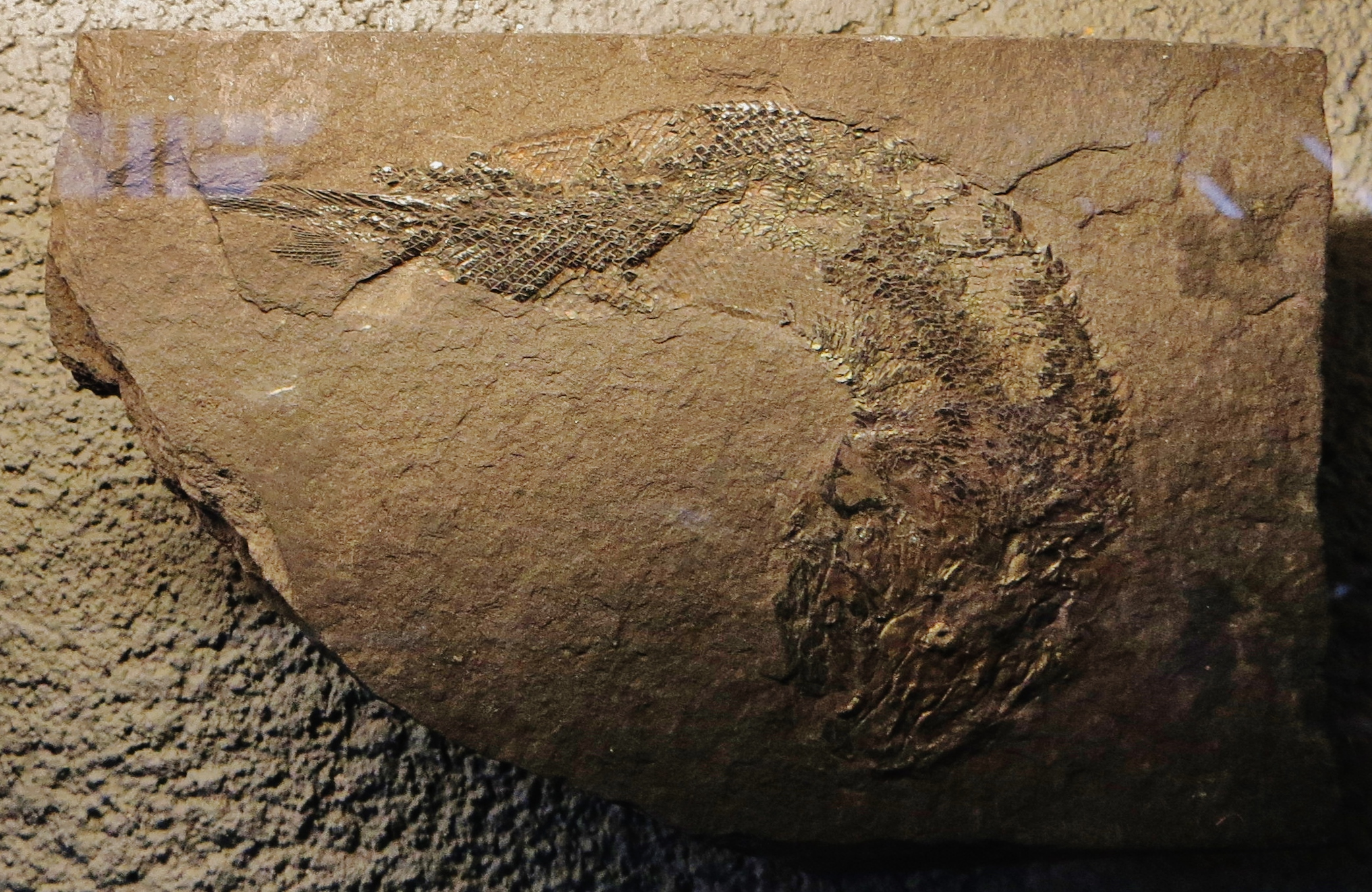
- Palaeoniscum freieslebeni fossil

Scientific classification
- Kingdom: Animalia
- Phylum: Chordata
- Class: Actinopterygii
- Order: †Palaeonisciformes
- Suborder: †Palaeoniscoidei
- Family: †Palaeoniscidae; Bonaparte, 1846

= Palaeoniscidae =

Palaeoniscidae Temporal range: Guadalupian-Lopingian

Extinct family of fishes

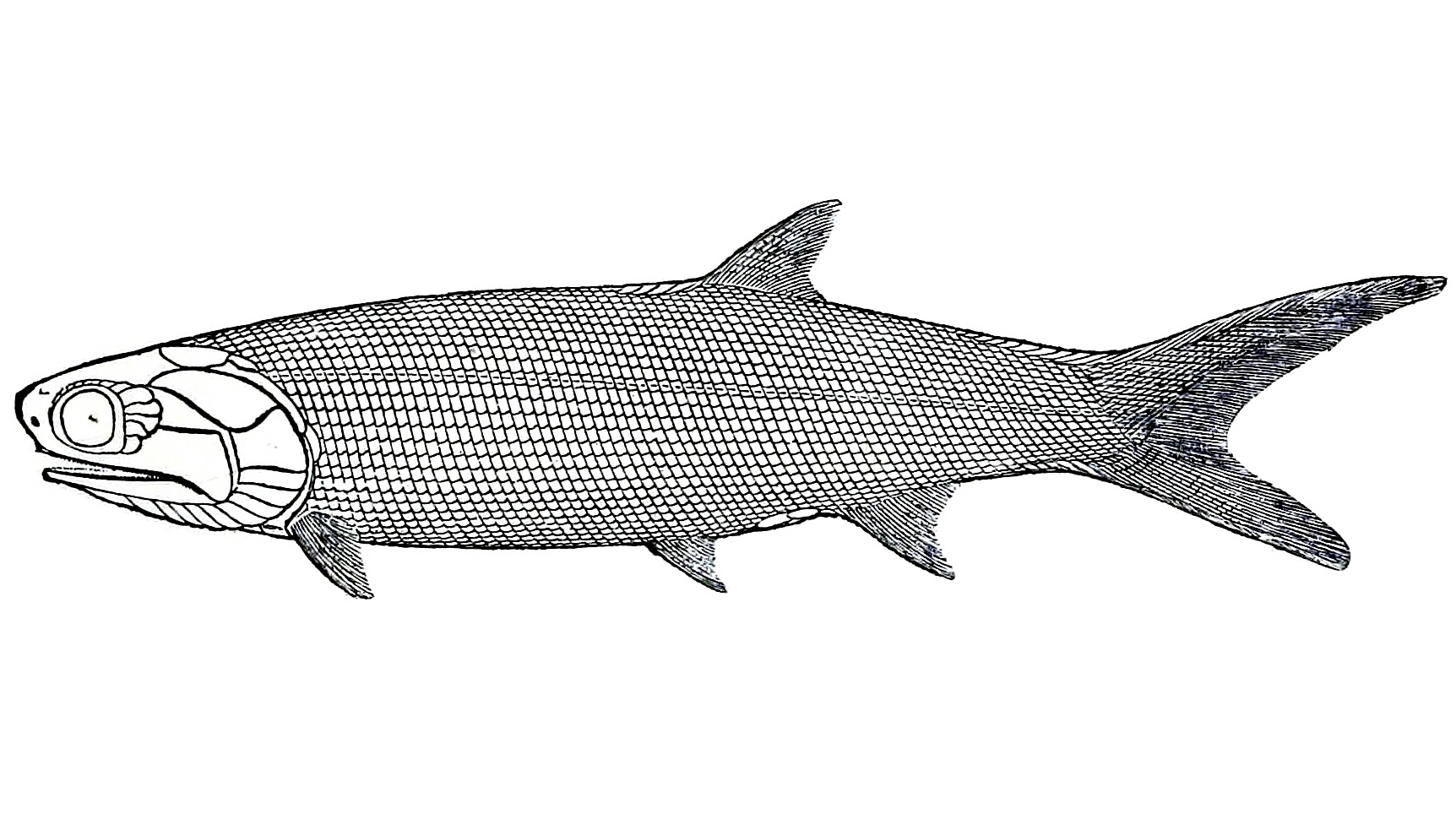
Restoration of Palaeoniscum freieslebeni showing the typical morphology of most taxa that have been referred to Palaeoniscidae

Palaeoniscidae is an extinct family of "palaeoniscoid" ray-finned fishes (Actinopterygii). The family includes the genus Palaeoniscum and potentially other Palaeozoic and Mesozoic early actinopterygian genera. The name is derived from the Ancient Greek words παλαιός (palaiós, ancient) and ὀνίσκος (oniskos, 'cod-fish' or woodlouse).

== Historic background ==
The family was first named "Palaeoniscini" by Charles Lucien Bonaparte in 1846, and "Palaeonisciden" by Carl Vogt in 1851. Later, the family name was standardized to Palaeoniscidae. The authorship of the family Palaeoniscidae is variably attributed to either Bonaparte or Vogt in the literature. Vogt ascribed the following genera to Palaeoniscidae: Palaeoniscum, Platysomus (misspelled as Platysemius), Amblypterus, Eurynotus, Pygopterus, and Acrolepis. With the exception of Palaeoniscum, these genera were later placed in separate families (Platysomidae, Amblypteridae) or are considered incertae sedis.

Over the years, many other genera of Palaeozoic and Mesozoic early actinopterygians have been referred to Palaeoniscidae due to superficial similarities with the type genus Palaeoniscum from the Guadalupian-Lopingian (middle-late Permian) of Europe. Similarities were noted in their general morphology, such as the bullet shaped head and forward position of the relatively large eyes, the large gape and oblique jaw support, the body being covered with small, rhombic scales that often show peg-and-socket articulation, and the arrangement and structure of the fins, including the heterocercal caudal fin. However, these features are plesiomorphic for actinopterygians. Many taxa ascribed to Palaeoniscidae lack apomorphies that would securely affiliate them with Palaeoniscum. As a result, Palaeoniscidae sensu lato has become a wastebasket taxon (probably paraphyletic).

In the strict sense, the Palaeoniscidae should only encompass the genus Palaeoniscum and only those genera that are closely related to it. However, due to insufficient knowledge of Palaeoniscum and many other early actinopterygians, and because most of these taxa have never been included in cladistic analyses, it is still uncertain which genera other than Palaeoniscum should be placed in Palaeoniscidae sensu stricto to make this a monophyletic group.

== Classification ==
The following list includes species and genera that have been referred to Palaeoniscidae in the past, usually because of broad resemblance with Palaeoniscum freieslebeni. Many of these taxa are poorly known and have never been analyzed in cladistic studies. Their inclusion in Palaeoniscidae is in most cases doubtful and requires confirmation by cladistic analyses. The listed taxa would imply that the temporal range of the family Palaeoniscidae stretched from the early Permian to the Cretaceous. If only species of Palaeoniscum are included, the temporal range of the family would be restricted to the middle-late Permian.

- Family †Palaeoniscidae Vogt, 1852
  - Genus ?†Agecephalichthys Wade, 1935
    - Species †Agecephalichthys granulatus Wade, 1935
  - Genus ?†Atherstonia Woodward, 1889 [Broometta Chabakov, 1927]
    - Species †Atherstonia scutata Woodward, 1889 [Atherstonia cairncrossi Broom, 1913; Amblypterus capensis Broom, 1913; Broometta cairncrossi Chabakov, 1927]
    - Species †Atherstonia minor Woodward, 1893
  - Genus ?†Cryphaeiolepis Traquair, 1881
    - Species †Cryphaeiolepis scutata Traquair, 1881
  - Genus ?†Cteniolepidotrichia Poplin & Su, 1992
    - Species †Cteniolepidotrichia turfanensis Poplin & Su, 1992
  - Genus †Dicellopyge Brough, 1931
    - Species †Dicellopyge macrodentata Brough, 1931
    - Species †Dicellopyge lissocephalus Brough, 1931
  - Genus ?†Duwaichthys Liu et al., 1990
    - Species †Duwaichthys mirabilis Liu et al., 1990
  - Genus ?†Ferganiscus Sytchevskaya & Yakolev, 1999
    - Species †Ferganiscus osteolepis Sytchevskaya & Yakolev, 1999
  - Genus †Gyrolepis Agassiz, 1833 non Kade, 1858
    - Species †G. albertii Agassiz, 1833
    - Species †G. gigantea Agassiz, 1833
    - Species †G. maxima Agassiz, 1833
    - Species †G. quenstedti Dames, 1888
    - Species †G. tenuistriata Agassiz, 1833
  - Genus †Gyrolepidoides Cabrera, 1944
    - Species †G. creyanus Schaeffer, 1955
    - Species †G. cuyanus Cabrera, 1944
    - Species †G. multistriatus Rusconi, 1948
  - Genus ?†Palaeoniscinotus Rohon, 1890
    - Species †P. czekanowskii Rohon, 1890
  - Genus †Palaeoniscum de Blainville, 1818 [Palaeoniscus Agassiz, 1833 non Von Meyer, 1858; Palaeoniscas Rzchak, 1881; Eupalaeoniscus Rzchak, 1881; Palaeomyzon Weigelt, 1930; Geomichthys Sauvage, 1888]
    - Species †P. angustum (Rzehak, 1881) [Palaeoniscas angustus Rzehak, 1881]
    - Species †P. antipodeum (Egerton, 1864) [Palaeoniscus antipodeus Egerton, 1864]
    - Species †P. antiquum Williams, 1886
    - Species †P. arenaceum Berger, 1832
    - Species †P. capense (Bloom, 1913) [Palaeoniscus capensis Bloom, 1913]
    - Species †P. comtum (Agassiz, 1833) [Palaeoniscus comtus Agassiz, 1833]
    - Species †P. daedalium Yankevich & Minich, 1998
    - Species †P. devonicum Clarke, 1885
    - Species †P. elegans (Sedgwick, 1829) [Palaeoniscus elegans Sedgwick, 1829]
    - Species †P. freieslebeni de Blainville, 1818 [Eupalaeoniscus freieslebeni (de Brainville, 1818); Palaeoniscus freieslebeni (de Brainville, 1818)]
    - Species †P. hassiae (Jaekel, 1898) [Galeocerdo contortus hassiae Jaekel, 1898; Palaeomyzon hassiae (Jaekel, 1898)]
    - Species †P. kasanense Geinitz & Vetter, 1880
    - Species †P. katholitzkianum (Rzehak, 1881) [Palaeoniscas katholitzkianus Rzehak, 1881]
    - Species †P. landrioti (le Sauvage, 1890) [Palaeoniscus landrioti le Sauvage, 1890]
    - Species †P. longissimum (Agassiz, 1833) [Palaeoniscus longissimus Agassiz, 1833]
    - Species †P. macrophthalmum (McCoy, 1855) [Palaeoniscus macrophthalmus McCoy, 1855]
    - Species †P. magnum (Woodward, 1937) [Palaeoniscus magnus Woodward, 1937]
    - Species †P. moravicum (Rzehak, 1881) [Palaeoniscas moravicus Rzehak, 1881]
    - Species †P. promtu (Rzehak, 1881) [Palaeoniscas promtus Rzehak, 1881]
    - Species †P. reticulatum Williams, 1886
    - Species †P. scutigerum Newberry, 1868
    - Species †P. vratislavensis (Agassiz, 1833) [Palaeoniscus vratislavensis Agassiz, 1833]
  - Genus †Palaeothrissum de Blainville, 1818
    - Species †P. elegans Sedgwick, 1829
    - Species †P. macrocephalum de Blainville, 1818
    - Species †P. magnum de Blainville, 1818
  - Genus ?†Shuniscus Su, 1983
    - Species †Shuniscus longianalis Su, 1983
  - Genus ?†Suchonichthys Minich, 2001
    - Species †Suchonichthys molini Minich, 2001
  - Genus ?†Trachelacanthus Fischer De Waldheim, 1850
    - Species †Trachelacanthus stschurovskii Fischer De Waldheim, 1850
  - Genus ?†Triassodus Su, 1984
    - Species †Triassodus yanchangensis Su, 1984
  - Genus ?†Turfania Liu & Martínez, 1973
    - Species †T. taoshuyuanensis Liu & Martínez, 1973
    - Species †T. varta Wang, 1979
  - Genus ?†Turgoniscus Jakovlev, 1968
    - Species †Turgoniscus reissi Jakovlev, 1968
  - Genus ?†Weixiniscus Su & Dezao, 1994
    - Species †Weixiniscus microlepis Su & Dezao, 1994
  - Genus ?†Xingshikous Liu, 1988
    - Species †Xingshikous xishanensis Liu, 1988
  - Genus ?†Yaomoshania Poplin et al., 1991
    - Species †Yaomoshania minutosquama Poplin et al., 1991
