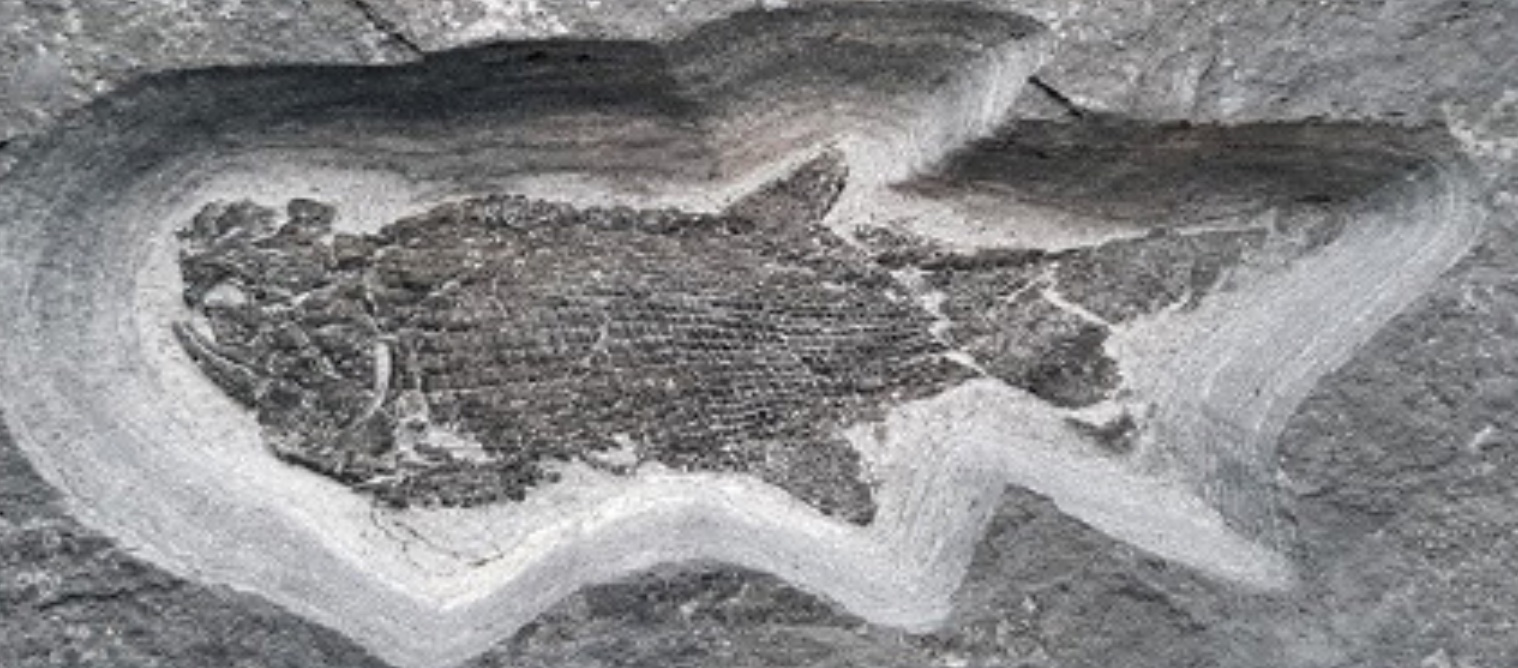
- Stegotrachelus finlayi fossil

Scientific classification
- Kingdom: Animalia
- Phylum: Chordata
- Class: Actinopterygii
- Order: †Palaeonisciformes
- Genus: †Stegotrachelus; Woodward & White, 1926

Type species
- †Stegotrachelus finlayi Woodward & White, 1926

= Stegotrachelus =

Stegotrachelus Temporal range: Middle Devonian

Extinct genus of ray-finned fishes

Stegotrachelus is an extinct genus of ray-finned fish that lived during the Givetian Stage of the Middle Devonian in what is now Shetland, Scotland.
