= Whiteichthys =

Whiteichthys Temporal range: Tournaisian

Scientific classification
- Kingdom: Animalia
- Phylum: Chordata
- Class: Actinopterygii
- Order: †Palaeonisciformes
- Genus: †Whiteichthys; Moy-Thomas, 1942
- Species: †W. greenlandicus

Binomial name
- †Whiteichthys greenlandicus Moy-Thomas, 1942

Extinct genus of ray-finned fishes

Whiteichthys is an extinct genus of ray-finned fish that lived during the Tournaisian age of the Mississippian epoch in what is now Greenland.

It is named after Errol Ivor White.

== Classification ==
Whiteichthys was variably classified in the families Palaeoniscidae, Canobiidae or Whiteichthyidae.
