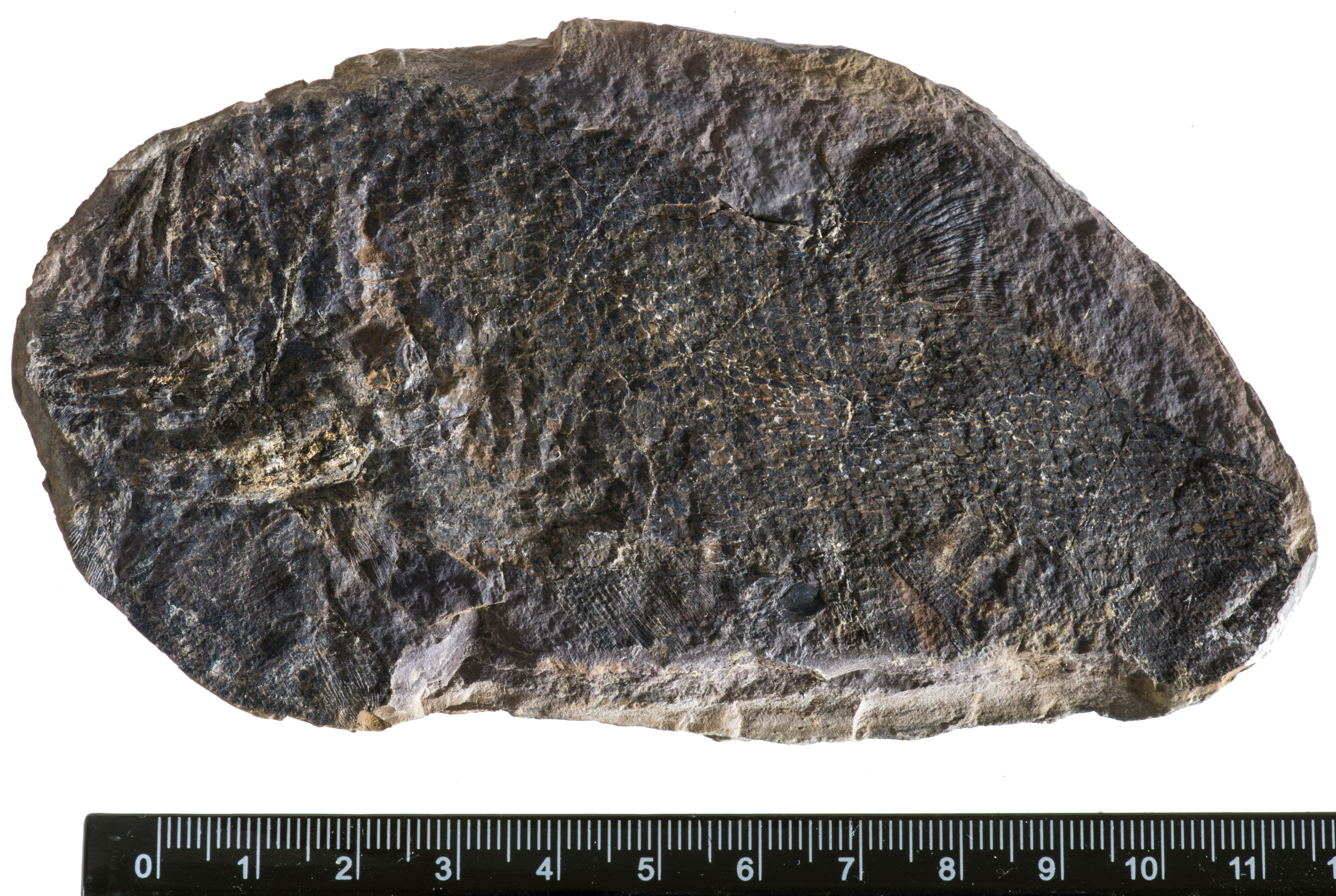
- Amblypterus latus fossil

Scientific classification
- Kingdom: Animalia
- Phylum: Chordata
- Class: Actinopterygii
- Order: †Paramblypteriformes
- Genus: †Amblypterus; Agassiz, 1833

Type species
- †Amblypterus latus Agassiz, 1833

Species
- See text

= Amblypterus =

Amblypterus Temporal range: Gzhelian to Artinskian

Extinct genus of fishes

Amblypterus (from Greek: ἀμβλύς amblys, 'blunt' and Greek: πτερόν pteron 'wing' or 'fin') is an extinct genus of freshwater ray-finned fish that lived during the Gzhelian (upper Carboniferous) and Cisuralian (lower Permian) epoch in what is now Europe (France & Germany) and possibly India, the United States and Argentina. Potential indeterminate records stretch as far back as the early Carboniferous.

== Taxonomy ==
This genus displays close similarities to Paramblypterus, to the extent that both may be synonymous, although presently they are considered distinct. The type specimen of A. latus is lost.

=== Species ===
The following species are known:

- A. arcuatus Egerton, 1850 - Early Permian (Sakmarian) of Germany (Goldlauterer Formation)
- A. baylei Sauvage, 1890 - - Early Permian (Asselian) of France (Muse Formation)
- A. beaumonti Egerton, 1850 - Asselian of France (Muse Formation)
- A. berthieri Sauvage, 1893 - Asselian of France (Assise de Millery Formation)
- A. bibractensis Sauvage, 1893 - Asselian of France (Assise de Millery Formation)
- A. decorus Egerton, 1850 - Late Carboniferous (Gzhelian) of France (Commentry Shales)
- A. kashmiriensis Woodward & Seward, 1905 - Early Permian (Artinskian) of Jammu & Kashmir, India (Mamal Formation)
- A. latus Agassiz, 1833 (type species) - Asselian of Germany (Meisenheim & Lebacher Schichten Formations)
- A. magnus Sauvage, 1890 - Asselian of France (Muse Formation)
- A. stewarti Romer, 1942 - Late Carboniferous (Kasimovian to Gzhelian) of West Virginia, US (Uniontown Limestone)
- A. symmetricus Woodward, 1905 - Artinskian of Jammu & Kashmir, India (Mamal Formation)
- A. traquairi Woodward, 1891 - Asselian of Germany (Meisenheim & Lebacher Schichten Formations)

=== Synonymy ===
- Amblypterus agassizi (Munster, 1835) → Gyrolepis agassizi Munster, 1835
- Amblypterus blainvillei (Agassiz, 1833) → Aeduella blainvillei (Agassiz, 1833) [= Palaeoniscus blainvillei Agassiz, 1833, Palaeothrissum inaequilobum Blainville, 1818]
- Amblypterus eurypterygius Agassiz, 1833 → Rhabdolepis macroptera (Bronn, 1829)
- Amblypterus duvernoyi Agassiz, 1833 → Paramblypterus duvernoyi (Agassiz, 1833)
- Amblypterus lateralis Agassiz, 1833 → Amblypterus latus Agassiz, 1833
- Amblypterus orientalis Eichwald, 1860 → ?Tetragonolepis murchisoni von Waldheim, 1842
- Amblypterus ornatus Emmons, 1857 (=A. carolinae Hay, 1902) → ?Turseodus sp.
- Amblypterus macropterus (Bronn, 1829) → Rhabdolepis macroptera (Bronn, 1829)

== See also ==
- Prehistoric fish
- List of prehistoric bony fish
