= Charleuxia =

Charleuxia Temporal range: Asselian

Scientific classification
- Kingdom: Animalia
- Phylum: Chordata
- Class: Actinopterygii
- Family: †Charleuxiidae; Heyler, 2000
- Genus: †Charleuxia; Heyler, 1969
- Species: †C. autunensis

Binomial name
- †Charleuxia autunensis Heyler, 1967

Extinct genus of fishes

Charleuxia is an extinct genus of prehistoric freshwater ray-finned fish that lived during the Asselian age (Cisuralian/early Permian epoch) in what is now Burgundy, France (Autun). It may possibly belong to the genus Paramblypterus.

== See also ==
- Prehistoric fish
- List of prehistoric bony fish
