= Tienshaniscus =

Tienshaniscus Temporal range: Lopingian

Scientific classification
- Domain: Eukaryota
- Kingdom: Animalia
- Phylum: Chordata
- Class: Actinopterygii
- Order: †Palaeonisciformes
- Genus: †Tienshaniscus; Liu & Wang, 1978
- Species: †T. longipterus

Binomial name
- †Tienshaniscus longipterus Liu & Wang, 1978

Extinct genus of fishes

Tienshaniscus is an extinct genus of prehistoric bony fish that lived during the Lopingian (late Permian) epoch in what is now Xinjiang, China.

== See also ==
- Prehistoric fish
- List of prehistoric bony fish
