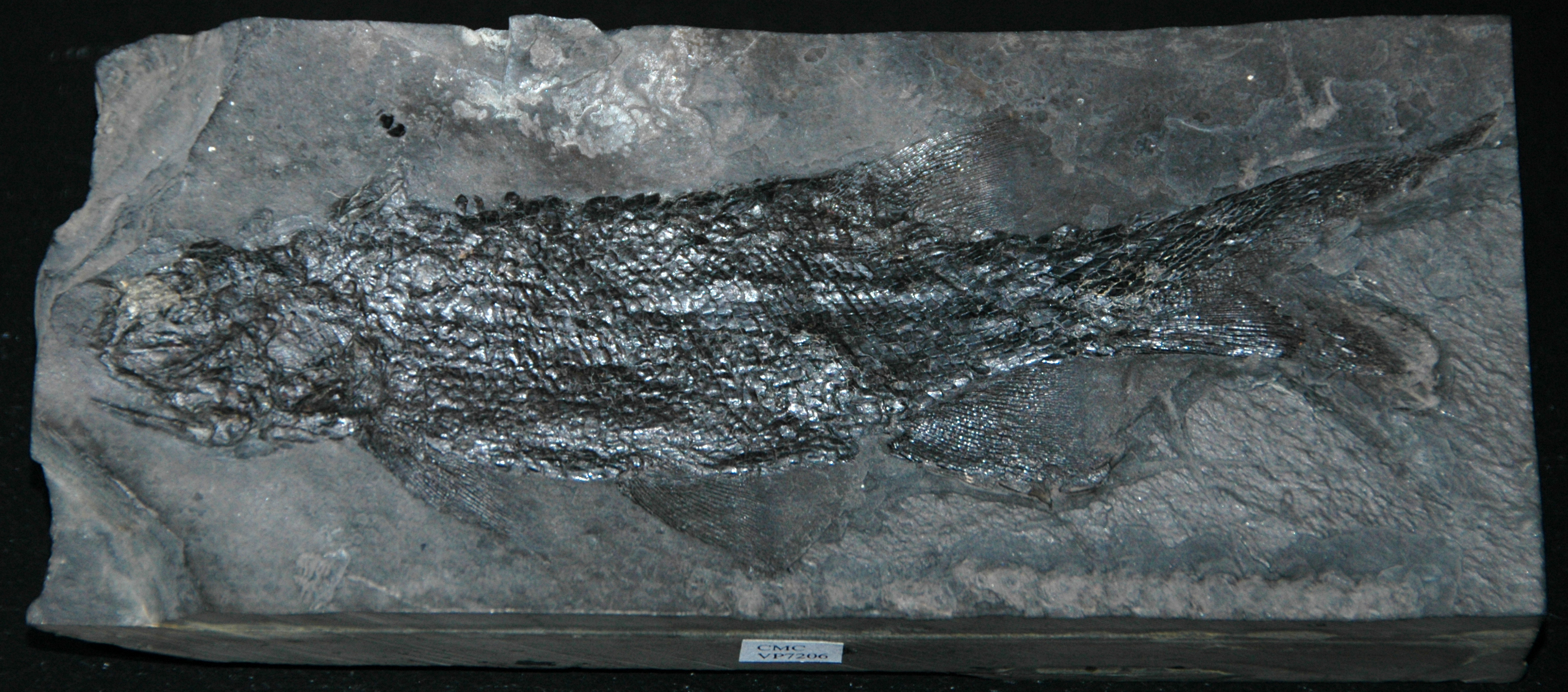
- Rhabdolepis macroptera fossil

Scientific classification
- Kingdom: Animalia
- Phylum: Chordata
- Class: Actinopterygii
- Order: †Palaeonisciformes
- Genus: †Rhabdolepis; Troschel, 1857

Type species
- †Palaeoniscum macropterum Bronn, 1829

Species
- †R. macroptera (Bronn, 1829); †R. saarbrueckensis Gardiner, 1963

= Rhabdolepis =

Rhabdolepis Temporal range: Asselian

Extinct genus of fishes

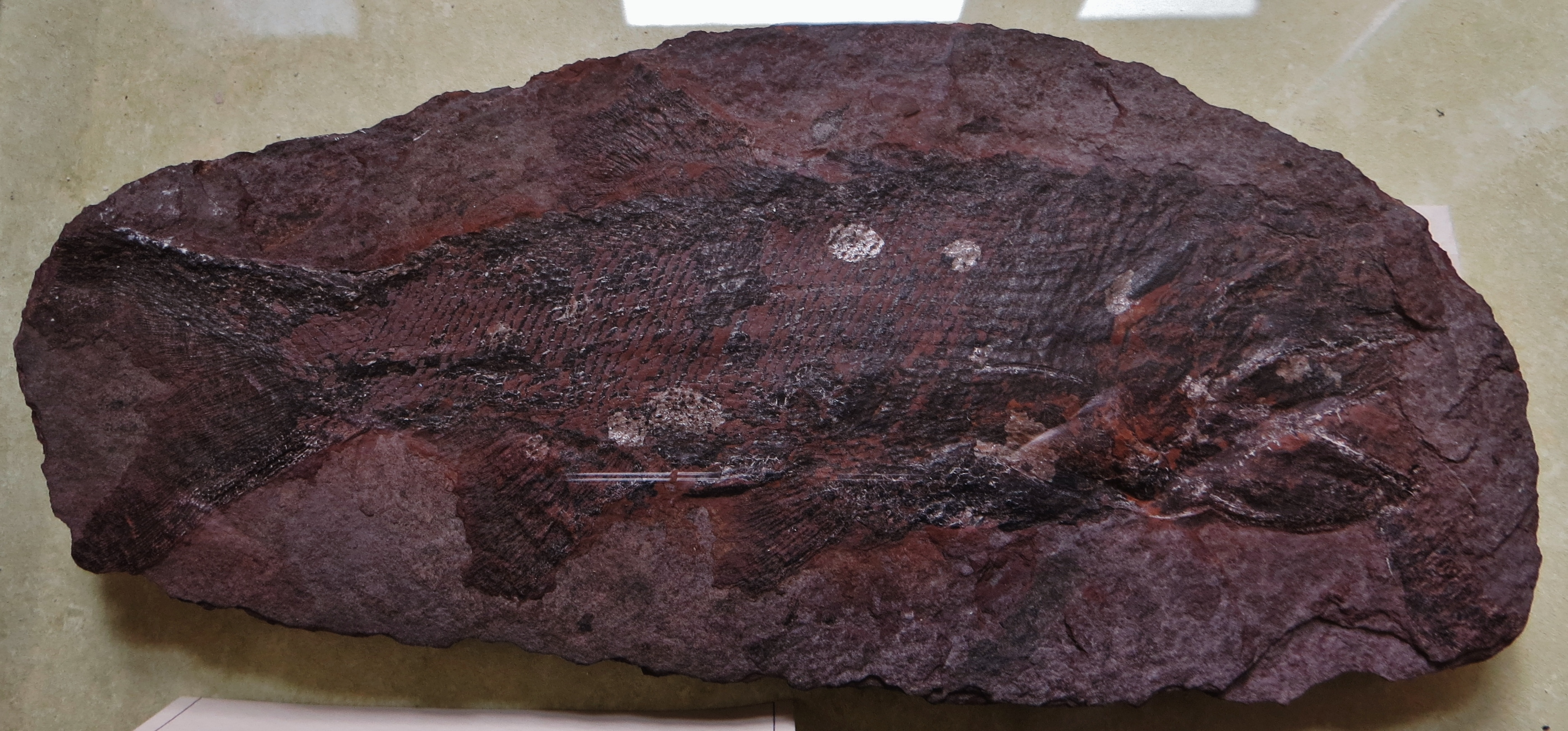
Rhabdolepis macroptera fossil

Rhabdolepis is an extinct genus of prehistoric bony fish that lived during the Asselian age of the Cisuralian (early Permian) epoch in what is now Germany (Rhineland-Palatine, Saarland) and France (Burgundy).

Two species are known, Rhabdolepis macroptera (=Amblypterus macropterus (Bronn, 1829)) and R. saarbrueckensis.

== See also ==
- Prehistoric fish
- List of prehistoric bony fish
