= Songanella =

Songanella Temporal range: Early Tithonian

Scientific classification
- Kingdom: Animalia
- Phylum: Chordata
- Class: Actinopterygii
- Order: †Palaeonisciformes
- Genus: †Songanella; Saint-Seine & Casier, 1962

Extinct genus of fishes

Songanella is an extinct genus of prehistoric bony fish that lived during the early Tithonian stage of the Late Jurassic epoch.

== See also ==
- Prehistoric fish
- List of prehistoric bony fish
