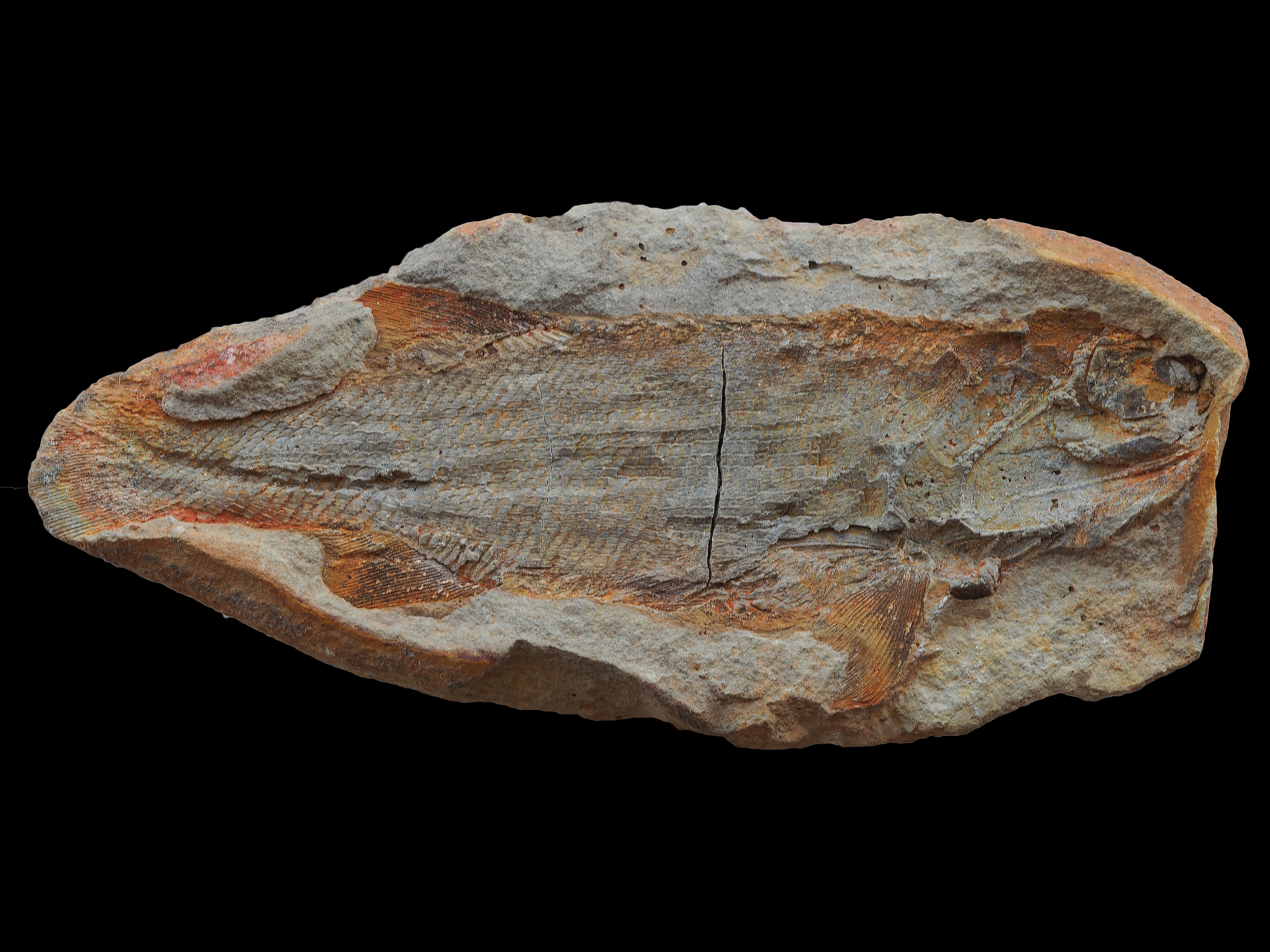
- Pteronisculus cicatrosus White, 1933 from the Triassic of Madagascar

Scientific classification
- Domain: Eukaryota
- Kingdom: Animalia
- Phylum: Chordata
- Class: Actinopterygii
- Family: †Turseoidae (?)
- Genus: †Pteronisculus; White, 1933

Type species
- †Pteronisculus cicatrosus White, 1933

Other species
- †P.? laetus (Lambe, 1916); †P. gyrolepidoides (Stensiö, 1921); †P. arcticus (Stensiö, 1932); †P. macropterus White, 1933; †P. stensioi (Nielsen, 1942); †P. gunnari (Nielsen, 1942); †P. magnus (Nielsen, 1942); †P. aldingeri (Nielsen, 1942); †P. arambourgi Lehman, 1952; †P. broughi Lehman, 1952; †P. nielseni Xu et al., 2014; †P. nevadanus Romano et al., 2019; †P. changae Ren & Xu, 2021

Synonyms
- †Glaucolepis Stensiö, 1921 (non Glaucolepis Braun, 1917)

= Pteronisculus =

Pteronisculus Temporal range: Induan–Anisian

Extinct genus of ray-finned fishes

Pteronisculus is an extinct genus of prehistoric ray-finned fish that lived during the Early Triassic and Middle Triassic epochs of the Triassic period worldwide.

It was first described under the name "Glaucolepis" by Erik Stensiö in 1921 and was later shown to be a synonym of Pteronisculus described by Errol White in 1933. However, because the name "Glaucolepis" is preoccupied (it had already been given to the extant lepidopteran insect Glaucolepis Braun, 1917), Pteronisculus became the valid genus name for the Triassic fish.

== Appearance and distribution ==
Like many other early ray-finned fishes, Pteronisculus had a bullet-shaped skull with large eyes near the front end, and a large gape armed with small to large, conical teeth. Its body was covered with small rhombic scales that show peg-and-socket articulation. Pteronisculus had enlarged pectoral fins and small pelvic fins. The dorsal and anal fins were virtually opposed to each other. The caudal fin was heterocercal.

Pteronisculus had a wide geographic range during the Early Triassic. Fossils were collected in Greenland, Madagascar, Spitsbergen and the United States. It is possibly also present in the Early Triassic of British Columbia, Canada; a species described as Acrolepis laetus by Lawrence Lambe has been tentatively referred to Pteronisculus. From the Middle Triassic, it is only known from South China. Its occurrence in the Permian of South Africa has been questioned. About 13 species have been described to date, ranging from 11 centimetres (0.36 ft) to 40 centimetres (1.3 ft) in length.

== Classification ==
Pteronisculus was originally referred to the family Palaeoniscidae, but was removed due to differences to Palaeoniscum. Based on similarities with the Late Triassic Turseodus, it was provisionally included in Turseoidae. A synapomorphy of Pteronisculus and Turseodus is the tooth-bearing lachrymal. However, Turseodus is incompletely known and a close relationship with Pteronisculus has not yet been tested with a cladistic analysis. In the cladistic analysis by Ren & Xu, Pteronisculus was recovered in a sister group relationship with the Carboniferous Cyranorhis, a genus that has been referred to the probably paraphyletic family Rhadinichthyidae.

== See also ==
- Prehistoric fish
- List of prehistoric bony fish
