= Paralogoniscus =

Paralogoniscus Temporal range: Cisuralian

Scientific classification
- Domain: Eukaryota
- Kingdom: Animalia
- Phylum: Chordata
- Class: Actinopterygii
- Order: †Palaeonisciformes
- Genus: †Paralogoniscus; Kazantseva-Selezneva, 1981
- Species: †P. lautus

Binomial name
- †Paralogoniscus lautus Kazantseva-Selezneva, 1981

Extinct genus of fishes

Paralogoniscus is an extinct genus of prehistoric bony fish that lived during the Cisuralian (early Permian) epoch in what is now East Kazakhstan, Kazakhstan. It could reach body lengths of up to ca. 50 cm (20 in).

== See also ==
- Prehistoric fish
- List of prehistoric bony fish
