= Uydenia =

Uydenia Temporal range: Cisuralian

Scientific classification
- Domain: Eukaryota
- Kingdom: Animalia
- Phylum: Chordata
- Class: Actinopterygii
- Order: †Palaeonisciformes
- Genus: †Uydenia; Kasantseva-Selezneva, 1980

Type species
- Uydenia latifrons Kasantseva-Selezneva, 1980

Extinct genus of fishes

Uydenia is an extinct genus of prehistoric bony fish from the Cisuralian (early Permian) of Kazakhstan (East Kazakhstan).

== See also ==
- Prehistoric fish
- List of prehistoric bony fish
