= Neuburgella =

Neuburgella Temporal range: Cisuralian

Scientific classification
- Domain: Eukaryota
- Kingdom: Animalia
- Phylum: Chordata
- Class: Actinopterygii
- Order: †Palaeonisciformes
- Genus: †Neuburgella; Kazantseva-Selezneva, 1981
- Species: †N. cognominis

Binomial name
- †Neuburgella cognominis Kazantseva-Selezneva, 1981

Extinct genus of fishes

Neuburgella is an extinct genus of prehistoric bony fish that lived during the Cisuralian (early Permian) epoch in what is now Kazakhstan (East Kazakhstan).

== See also ==
- Prehistoric fish
- List of prehistoric bony fish
