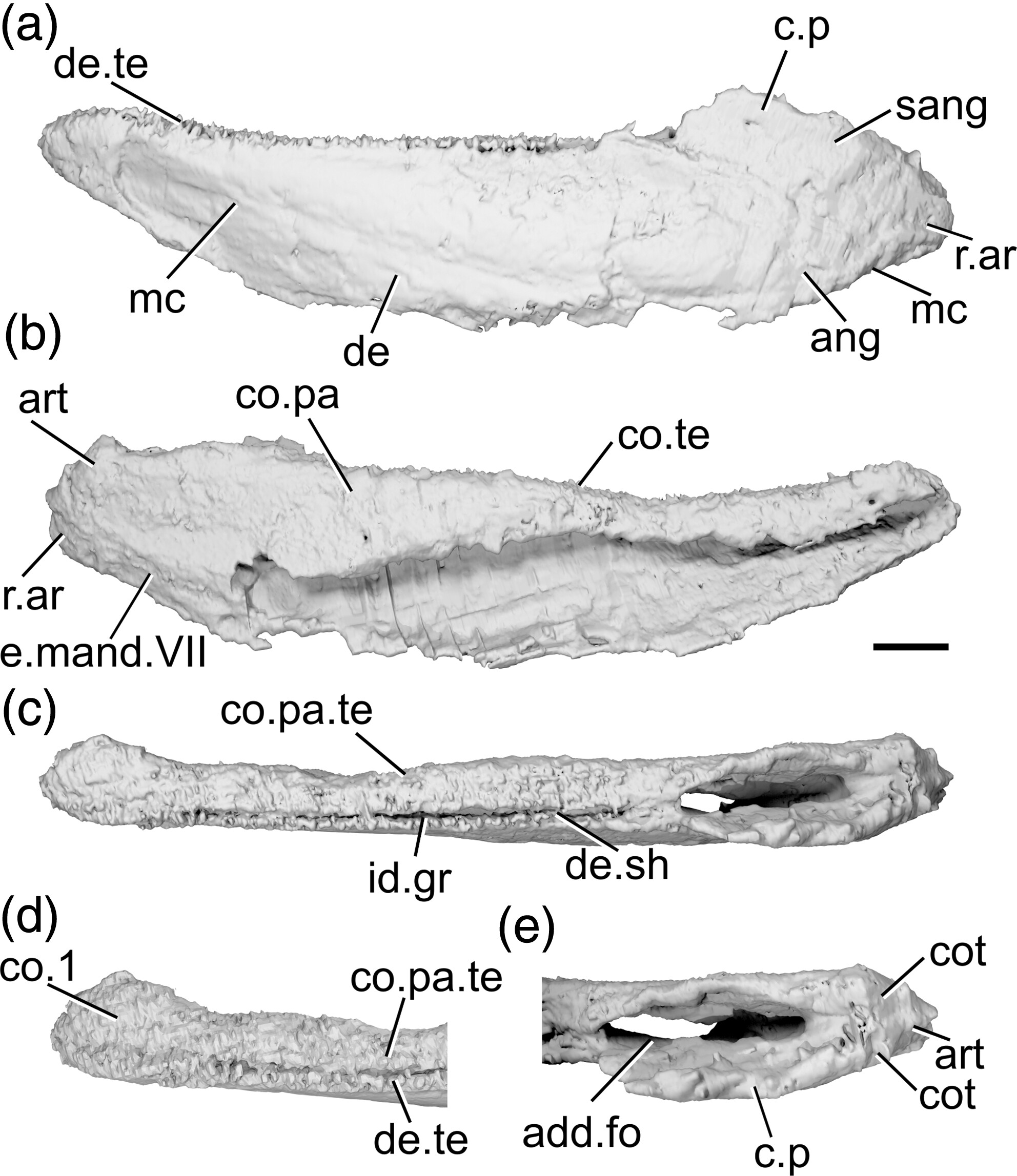
- Mandible of O. marginis

Scientific classification
- Kingdom: Animalia
- Phylum: Chordata
- Class: Actinopterygii
- Order: †Palaeonisciformes
- Genus: †Osorioichthys; Casier, 1954

= Osorioichthys =

Extinct genus of ray-finned fishes

Osorioichthys is an extinct genus of ray-finned fish.
