= Kalops =

Kalops Temporal range: Carboniferous (Serpukhovian to Moscovian), 324–311 Ma

Scientific classification
- Kingdom: Animalia
- Phylum: Chordata
- Class: Actinopterygii
- Genus: †Kalops; Poplin & Lund, 2002

Species
- †K. diophrys Poplin & Lund, 2002; †K. monophrys Poplin & Lund, 2002; †K. loganensis Shen, 2025

Extinct genus of actinopterygian fish

Kalops is an extinct genus of marine "palaeoniscoid" ray-finned fish from the Carboniferous of North America, known from the late Mississippian to the mid-Pennsylvanian. It is known from complete articulated skeletons described from two different localities in different parts of the United States.

The following species are known:

- K. diophrys Poplin & Lund, 2002 - late Mississippian (Serpukhovian) of Montana, US (Bear Gulch Limestone)
- K. loganensis Shen, 2025 - mid-Pennsylvanian (Moscovian) of Indiana, US (Logan Quarry Shale of Staunton Formation)
- K. monophrys Poplin & Lund, 2002 - late Mississippian (Serpukhovian) of Montana, US (Bear Gulch Limestone)

The genus name Kalops, meaning "beautiful look" in Greek, references the orbital bone series overhanging over the eyes, giving off the appearance of eyelashes.

Kalops displayed a fusiform body plan and appears to have been an epipelagic genus that inhabited tropical marine habitats. Its pelagic lifestyle may have allowed it to withstand the dramatic drop in sea levels associated with the Carboniferous glaciation, which drove more nearshore fish to extinction, hence its occurrence in both Mississippian and Pennsylvanian deposits.
