= Styracopterus =

Styracopterus Temporal range: Tournaisian

Scientific classification
- Kingdom: Animalia
- Phylum: Chordata
- Class: Actinopterygii
- Order: †Eurynotiformes
- Family: †Styracopteridae
- Genus: †Styracopterus; Traquair, 1890
- Species: †S. fulcratus

Binomial name
- †Styracopterus fulcratus Traquair, 1890

Synonyms
- ?Fouldenia White, 1927; ?Holurus Traquair, 1890

Extinct genus of ray-finned fishes

Styracopterus is an extinct genus of ray-finned fish that lived during the Tournaisian stage of the Mississippian epoch of Scotland and Eastern European Platform, Russia.
