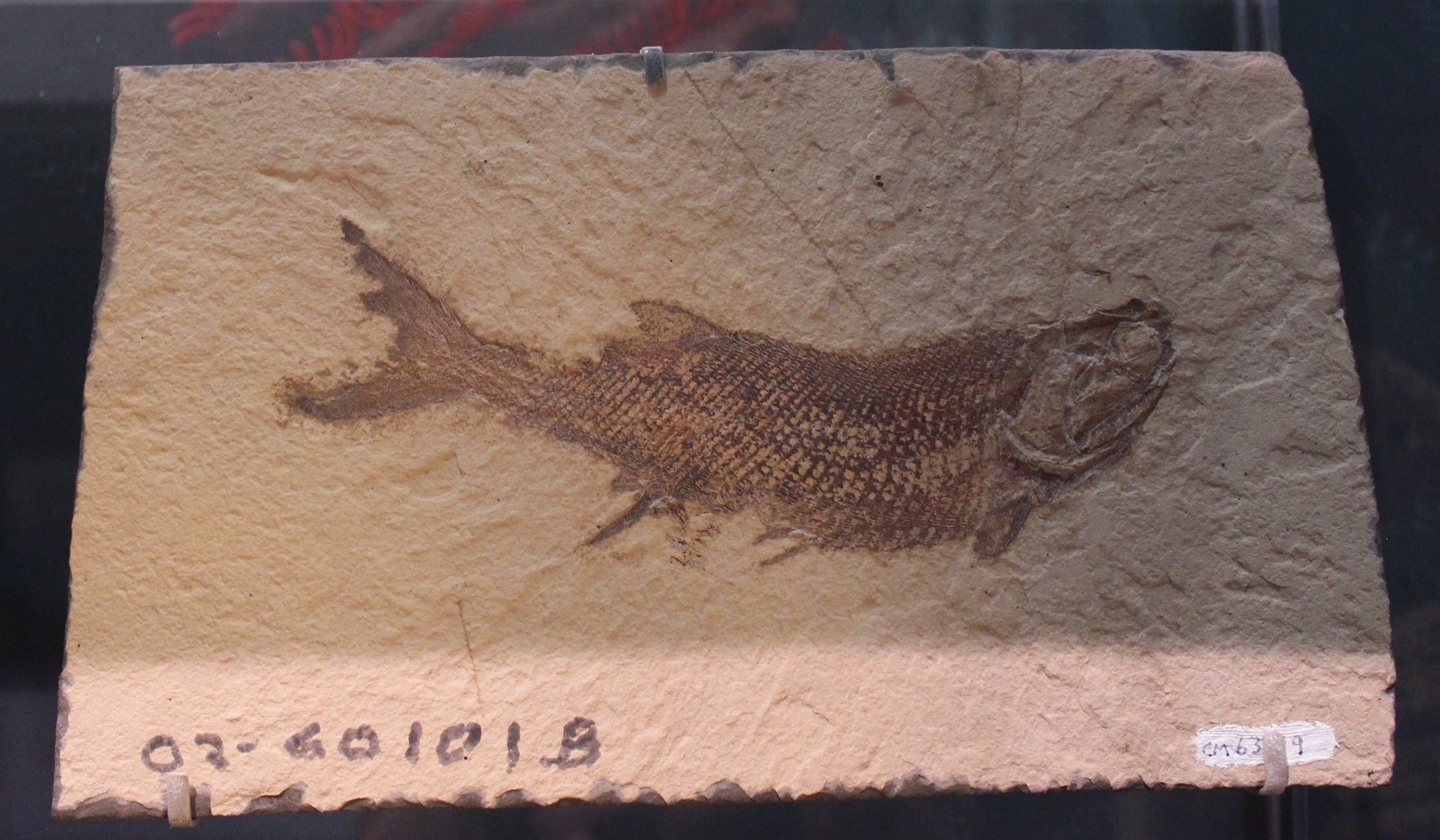
- C. bergeraci fossil, National Museum of Natural History

Scientific classification
- Domain: Eukaryota
- Kingdom: Animalia
- Phylum: Chordata
- Class: Actinopterygii
- Family: †Rhadinichthyidae
- Genus: †Cyranorhis; Lund & Poplin, 1997
- Species: †C. bergeraci

Binomial name
- †Cyranorhis bergeraci Lund & Poplin, 1997

= Cyranorhis =

Cyranorhis Temporal range: Serpukhovian

Extinct genus of ray-finned fishes

Cyranorhis is an extinct genus of marine ray-finned fish that lived during the Serpukhovian age of the Carboniferous period. One species is known, C. bergeraci in the Bear Gulch Limestone what is now Montana, United States. It is named after French novelist Cyrano de Bergerac.

== Classification ==
It is a member of the Rhadinichthyidae, a family of basal ray-finned fish that was formerly placed in the now-paraphyletic order Palaeonisciformes. Based on the cladistic analysis by Ren & Xu, Cyranorhis was recovered in a sister group relationship with the Triassic Pteronisculus which may thus represent a late-surviving rhadinichthyid.
