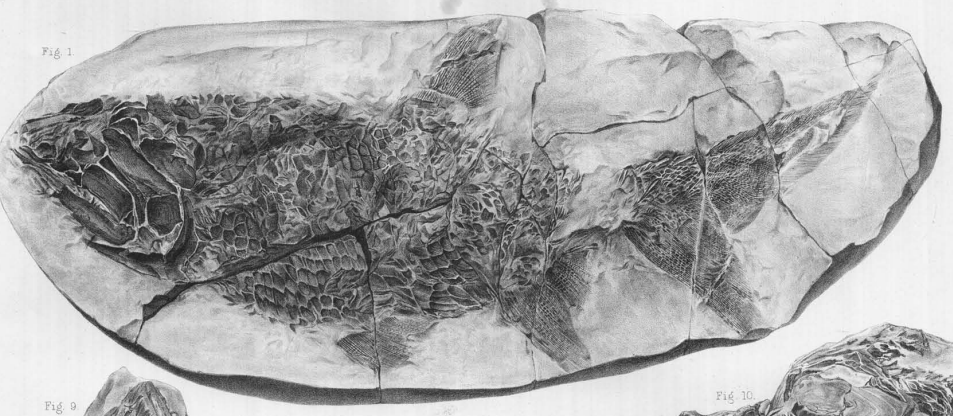
- Specimen of C. striatus

Scientific classification
- Kingdom: Animalia
- Phylum: Chordata
- Class: Actinopterygii
- Family: †Cosmoptychiidae; Gardiner, 1963
- Genus: †Cosmoptychius; Traquair, 1877
- Species: †C. striatus

Binomial name
- †Cosmoptychius striatus (Agassiz, 1835)

Synonyms
- †Amblypterus striatus Agassiz, 1835; †Cosmoptygius Traquair, 1877 (misspelling)

= Cosmoptychius =

Cosmoptychius Temporal range: Viséan

Extinct genus of ray-finned fishes

Cosmoptychius is an extinct genus of freshwater and estuarine ray-finned fish that lived during the Mississippian epoch. It contains a single species, C. striatus from the Visean of Scotland. It has a wide stratigraphic range in the Wardie Shale, with many specimens known.

Initially classified as either a palaeonisciform (a now-paraphyletic group of basal actinopterygians) or the earliest stem-group neopterygian, it is now generally considered a stem-group actinopteran.
