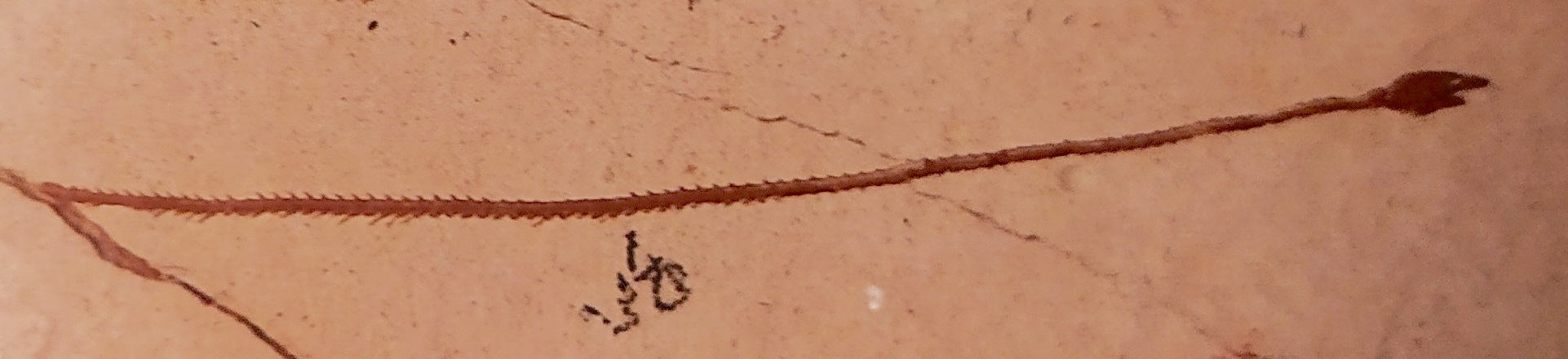
- fossil of W. breviculus

Scientific classification
- Domain: Eukaryota
- Kingdom: Animalia
- Phylum: Chordata
- Class: Actinopterygii
- Order: Anguilliformes
- Genus: †Whitapodus; Blot, 1981

= Whitapodus =

Whitapodus Temporal range: Early- Middle Eocene

Extinct genus of fishes

Whitapodus is an extinct genus of prehistoric bony fish that lived from the early to middle Eocene.

== See also ==
- Prehistoric fish
- List of prehistoric bony fish
