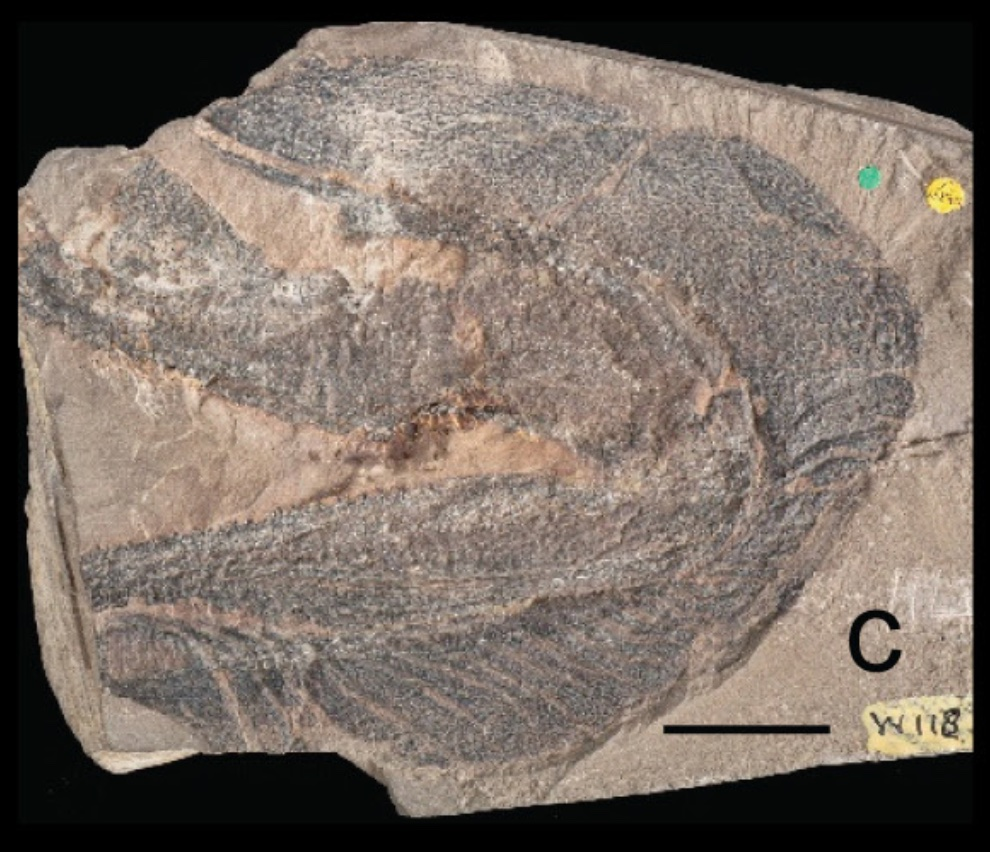

Scientific classification
- Kingdom: Animalia
- Phylum: Chordata
- Class: Actinopterygii
- Order: †Palaeonisciformes (?)
- Genus: †Agecephalichthys; Wade, 1935
- Species: †A. granulatus

Binomial name
- †Agecephalichthys granulatus Wade, 1935

= Agecephalichthys =

Agecephalichthys Temporal range: Anisian

Extinct genus of fishes

Agecephalichthys is an extinct genus of prehistoric freshwater "palaeonisciform" ray-finned fish that lived during the Anisian age (Middle Triassic epoch). It contains a single species, A. granulatus from the Hawkesbury Sandstone in what is now New South Wales, Australia.

== See also ==
- Prehistoric fish
- List of prehistoric bony fish
