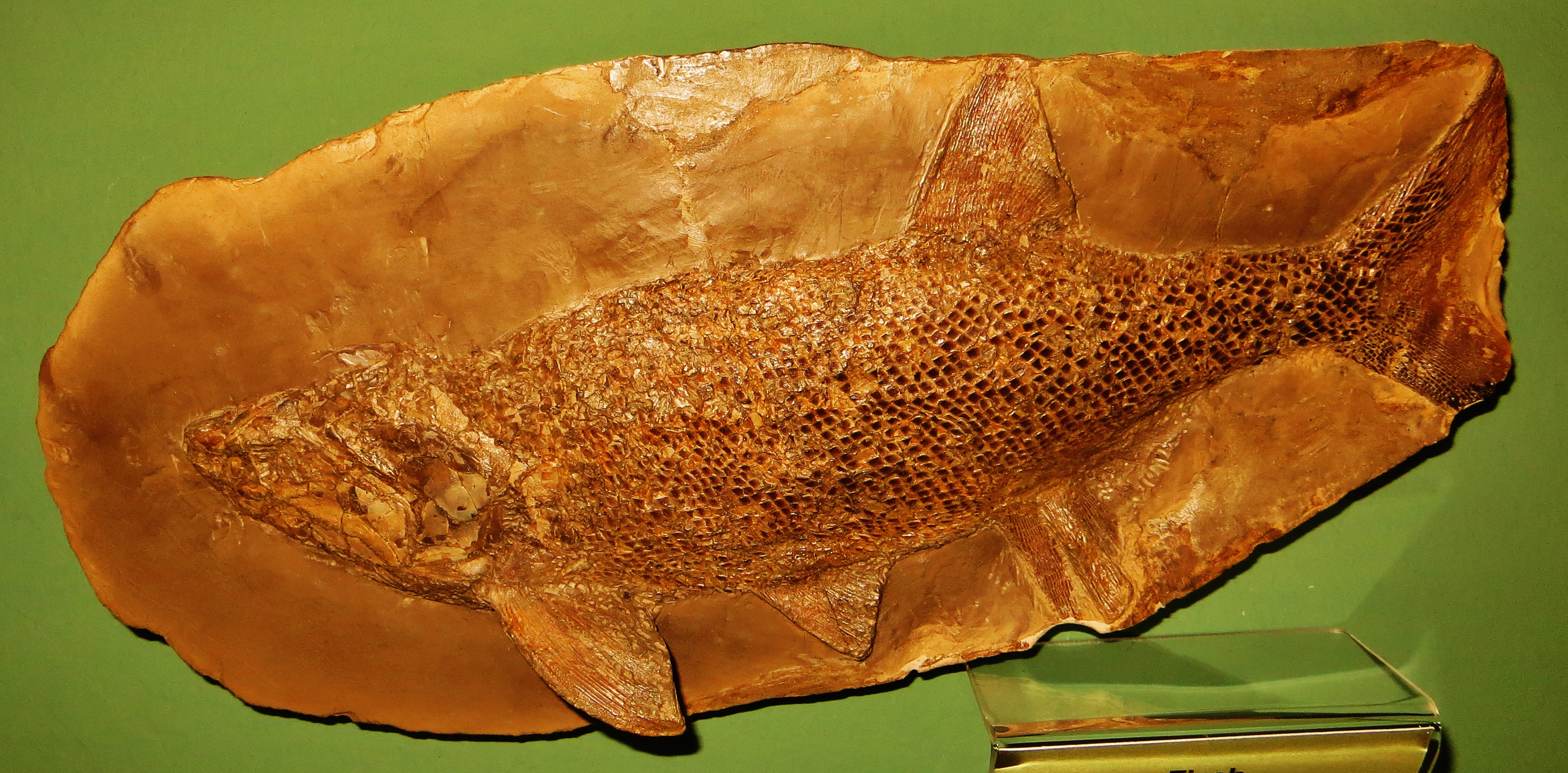
- Gyrolepis albertii fossil

Scientific classification
- Kingdom: Animalia
- Phylum: Chordata
- Class: Actinopterygii
- Order: †Palaeonisciformes
- Family: †Palaeoniscidae
- Genus: †Gyrolepis; Agassiz, 1835

Type species
- Gyrolepis albertii Agassiz, 1835

Other species
- †G. agassizi (Münster, 1835); †G. angulisulcatus Oertle, 1927; †G. quenstedti Dames, 1888; †G. parcisquamosus Oertle, 1927; †G. pompeckji Oertle, 1927

= Gyrolepis =

Gyrolepis Temporal range: Anisian-Rhaetian

Extinct genus of fishes

Gyrolepis is an extinct genus of prehistoric marine ray-finned fish from the Middle-Late Triassic epochs in what is now Europe. It is known both from complete specimens and isolated skeletal elements, such as scales or teeth.

== Taxonomy ==
The following species are placed in this genus:

- G. agassizi (Münster, 1835) - Anisian of Germany (Muschelkalk), Ladinian of France
- G. albertii Agassiz, 1835 (type species) - Anisian of the Netherlands (Vossenveld Formation of Muschelkalk), Poland (Wellenkalk Formation), late Anisian/early Ladinian of Germany (Muschelkalk), Norian of Austria (Seefelder Formation) & Belgium (Grès de Mortinsart Formation), Rhaetian of England (Westbury Formation) and France, potentially Anisian of Spain (Muschelkalk)
- G. angulisulcatus Oertle, 1927 - Ladinian of Germany (Muschelkalk)
- G. ornatus Giebel in Dames, 1888 - Anisian of Germany (Muschelkalk)
- G. quenstedti Dames, 1888 - Ladinian of Germany (Muschelkalk)
- G. parcisquamosus Oertle, 1927 - Ladinian of Germany (Muschelkalk)
- G. pompeckji Oertle, 1927 - Ladinian of Germany (Muschelkalk)
- G. tenuidentatus Oertle, 1928 - late Anisian/early Ladinian of Germany (Muschelkalk)

An indeterminate species is known from the Besano Formation of Italy & Switzerland. A potential species is also known from the Rhaetian of China.

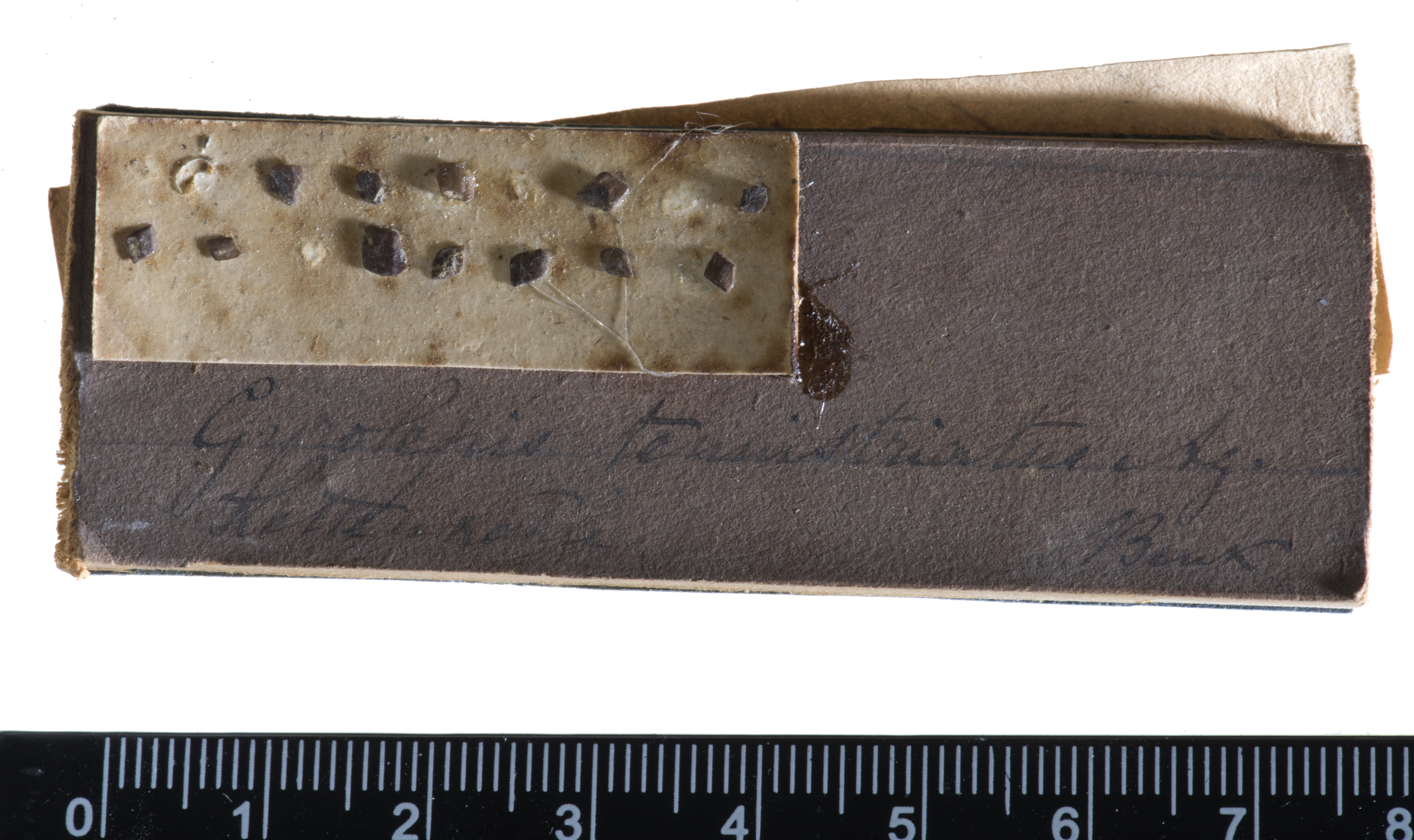
Isolated teeth and scales ascribed to Gyrolepis

== Distribution ==
Gyrolepis fossils have been found across much of the Northern Hemisphere, but the genus was by far most common in Europe. G. albertii, the type species of the genus, is a ubiquitous component of Rhaetian biotas in Europe.

== See also ==
- Prehistoric fish
- List of prehistoric bony fish
