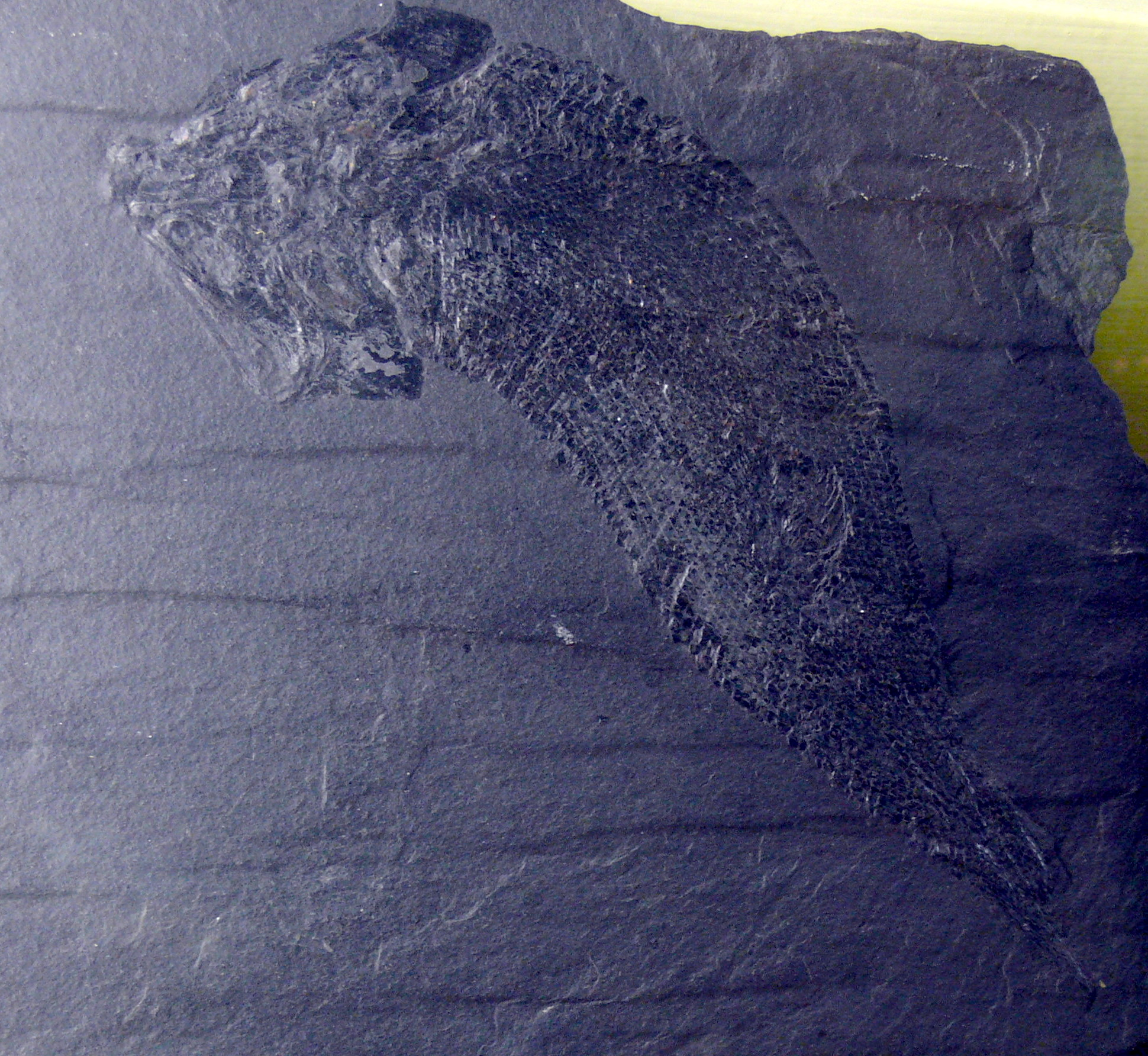
- Palaeoniscum freieslebeni fossil

Scientific classification
- Kingdom: Animalia
- Phylum: Chordata
- Class: Actinopterygii
- Order: †Palaeonisciformes
- Family: †Palaeoniscidae
- Genus: †Palaeoniscum; Blainville, 1818

Type species
- †Palaeoniscum freieslebeni Blainville, 1818

Other species
- see list

Synonyms
- †Palaeoniscus Agassiz, 1833 non Von Meyer, 1858; †Palaeoniscas Rzchak, 1881; †Eupalaeoniscus Rzchak, 1881; †Palaeomyzon Weigelt, 1930; †Geomichthys Sauvage, 1888

= Palaeoniscum =

Palaeoniscum Temporal range: Guadalupian-Lopingian

Extinct genus of fishes

Palaeoniscum (from Greek: παλαιός palaiós, 'ancient' and Greek: ὀνίσκος onískos 'cod-fish' or 'woodlouse') is an extinct genus of ray-finned fish from the Middle to Late Permian period (Guadalupian-Lopingian) of England, Germany, Turkey, North America and Greenland, and possibly other regions. The genus was named Palaeoniscum in 1818 by Henri Marie Ducrotay de Blainville, but was later misspelled as Palaeoniscus by Blainville and other authors (notably Louis Agassiz). Palaeoniscum belongs to the family Palaeoniscidae.

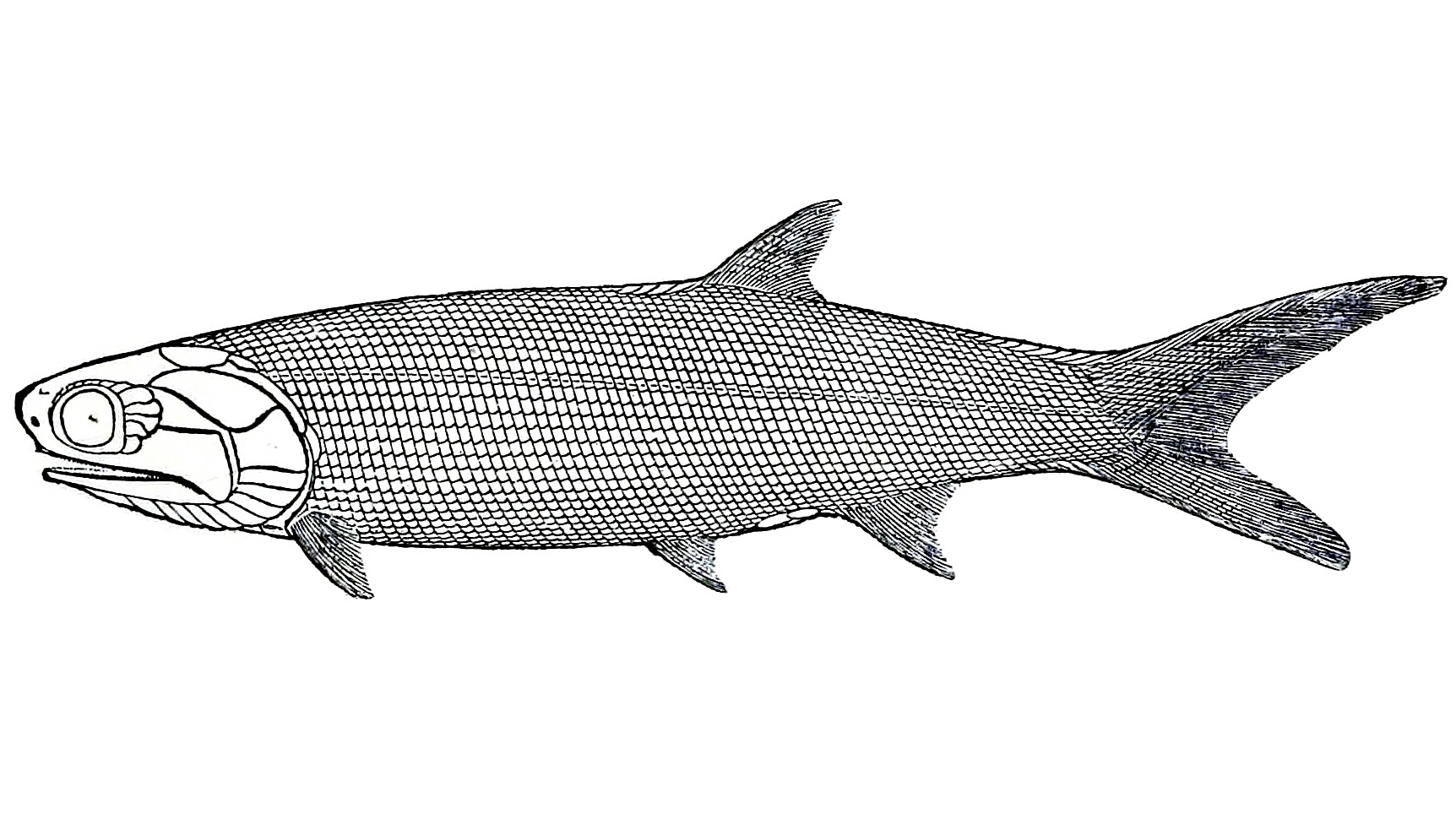
Restoration of Palaeoniscum

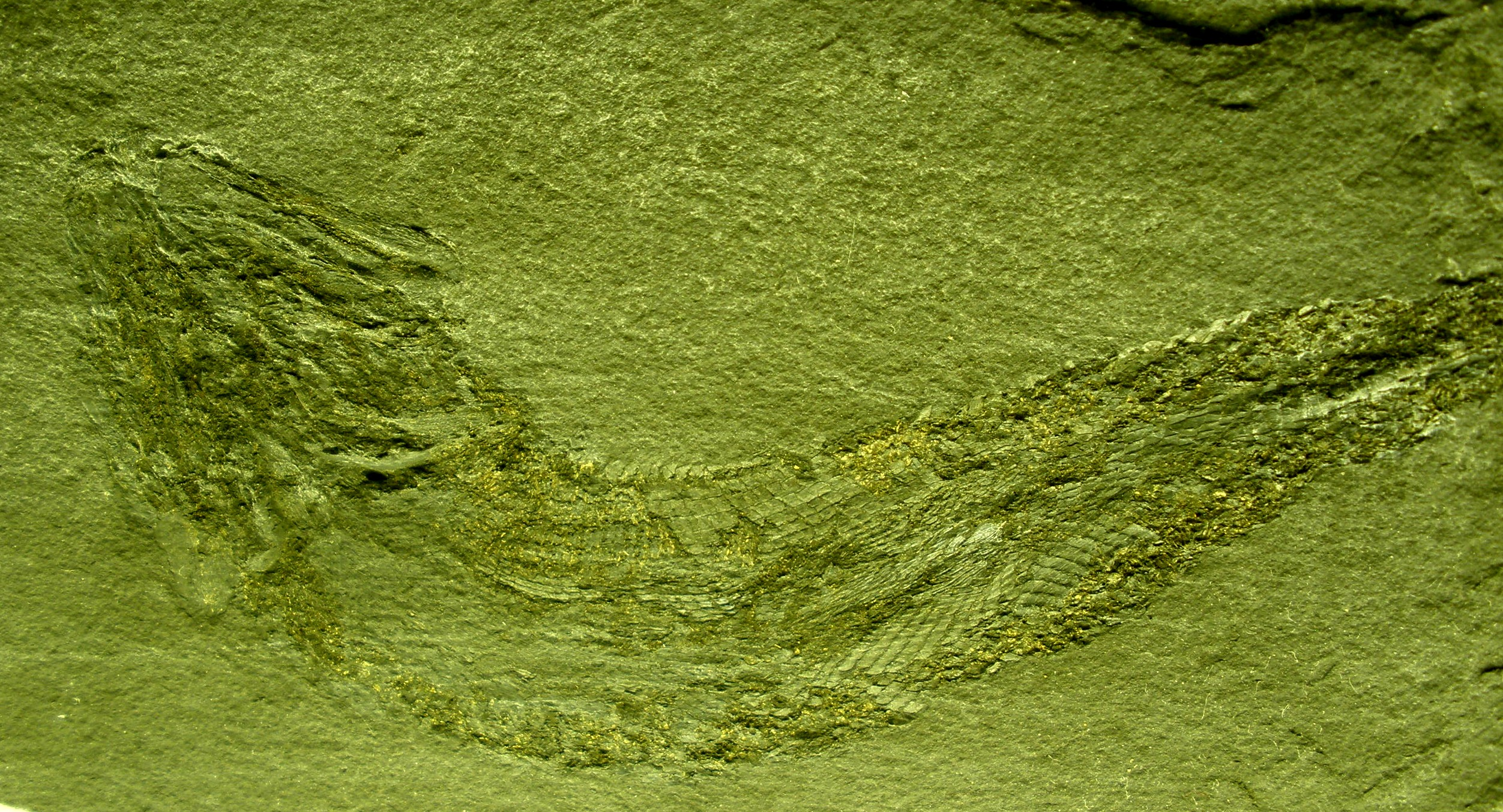
P. vratislavensis fossil

The type species Palaeoniscum freieslebeni was named after Johann Carl Freiesleben (1774–1846), mining commissioner of Saxony. P. freieslebeni is the most common taxon in the Wuchiapingian aged Kupferschiefer and Marl Slate, where it constitutes 80% of all fish fossils. The genus is considered to be a poorly defined wastebasket taxon.

Palaeoniscum had a torpedo-shaped body 30 cm (12 in) in length, with a deeply forked caudal fin and tall dorsal fin, indicating that it was a fast swimmer. It was probably an active predator, feeding on other freshwater fish. Its sharp teeth could be replaced when lost, a trait also seen in modern sharks. Like other early ray-finned fish, Palaeoniscum had air sacs connected to the mouth, which served as a primitive swim bladder.

Several Palaeozoic and Mesozoic species that have been ascribed to the genus Palaeoniscum were later shown to be only distantly related with P. freieslebeni. These species were subsequently removed and transferred to other genera (e.g., Acentrophorus, Aeduella, Paramblypterus, see list below). The allocation of other species to Palaeoniscum (see list below) is often doubtful and mostly based on superficial resemblance with P. freieslebeni.

Palaeoniscum is the name giving taxon of the extinct Palaeonisciformes (or Palaeoniscoidei), a polyphyletic group comprising several superficially similar looking but not closely related early actinopterygian taxa. Palaeonisciformes is considered a wastebasket taxon by modern taxonomic standards.

== Species ==
- †Palaeoniscum angustum (Rzehak, 1881) [†Palaeoniscas angustus Rzehak, 1881]
- †Palaeoniscum antipodeum (Egerton, 1864) [†Palaeoniscus antipodeus Egerton, 1864]
- †Palaeoniscum antiquum Williams, 1886
- †Palaeoniscum arenaceum Berger, 1832
- †Palaeoniscum capense (Bloom, 1913) [†Palaeoniscus capensis Bloom, 1913]
- †Palaeoniscum comtum (Agassiz, 1833) [†Palaeoniscus comtus Agassiz, 1833]
- †Palaeoniscum crassum (Woodward, 1908) [†Palaeoniscus crassus Woodward, 1908]
- †Palaeoniscum daedalium Yankevich & Minich, 1998
- †Palaeoniscum devonicum Clarke, 1885
- †Palaeoniscum elegans (Sedgwick, 1829) [†Palaeoniscus elegans Sedgwick, 1829]
- †Palaeoniscum freieslebeni de Blainville, 1818 (type species) [†Eupalaeoniscus freieslebeni (de Brainville, 1818); †Palaeoniscus freieslebeni (de Brainville, 1818); †Palaeoniscus macropomus Agassiz, 1833; †Palaeoniscus magnus Woodward, 1937]
- †Palaeoniscum hassiae (Jaekel, 1898) [†Galeocerdo contortus hassiae Jaekel, 1898; †Palaeomyzon hassiae (Jaekel, 1898)]
- †Palaeoniscum kasanense Geinitz & Vetter, 1880
- †Palaeoniscum katholitzkianum (Rzehak, 1881) [†Palaeoniscas katholitzkianus Rzehak, 1881]
- †Palaeoniscum landrioti (le Sauvage, 1890) [†Palaeoniscus landrioti le Sauvage, 1890]
- †Palaeoniscum longissimum (Agassiz, 1833) [†Palaeoniscus longissimus Agassiz, 1833]
- †Palaeoniscum macrophthalmum (McCoy, 1855) [†Palaeoniscus macrophthalmus McCoy, 1855]
- †Palaeoniscum moravicum (Rzehak, 1881) [†Palaeoniscas moravicus Rzehak, 1881]
- †Palaeoniscum promtus (Rzehak, 1881) [†Palaeoniscas promtus Rzehak, 1881]
- †Palaeoniscum reticulatum Williams, 1886
- †Palaeoniscum scutigerum Newberry, 1868

== Species moved to other genera ==
- †Palaeoniscum abbsi Kirkby, 1862 → †Acentrophorus varians (Kirkby, 1862)
- †Palaeoniscum glaphyrus (Agassiz, 1835) [†Palaeoniscus glaphyrus] Agassiz, 1835 → †Acentrophorus glaphyrus (Agassiz, 1835)
- †Palaeoniscum blainvillei (Agassiz, 1833) [†Palaeoniscus blainvillei Agassiz, 1833] → †Aeduella blainvillei (Agassiz, 1833)
- †Palaeoniscum delessei (Sauvage, 1878) → †Aeduella blainvillei (Agassiz, 1833)
- †Palaeoniscum gelberti Goldfuss, 1847 → †Paramblypterus duvernoyi (Agassiz, 1833)
- †Palaeoniscum vratislaviensis (Agassiz, 1833) [†Palaeoniscus vratislaviensis Agassiz, 1833] → †Paramblypterus vratislaviensis (Agassiz, 1833)
