= Trachelacanthus =

Trachelacanthus Temporal range: Late Permian

Scientific classification
- Domain: Eukaryota
- Kingdom: Animalia
- Phylum: Chordata
- Class: Actinopterygii
- Order: †Palaeonisciformes
- Genus: †Trachelacanthus; Fischer De Waldheim, 1850
- Species: †T. stschurovskii

Binomial name
- †Trachelacanthus stschurovskii Fischer De Waldheim, 1850

Extinct genus of fishes

Trachelacanthus is an extinct genus of prehistoric bony fish that lived during the Late Permian epoch.

== See also ==
- Prehistoric fish
- List of prehistoric bony fish
