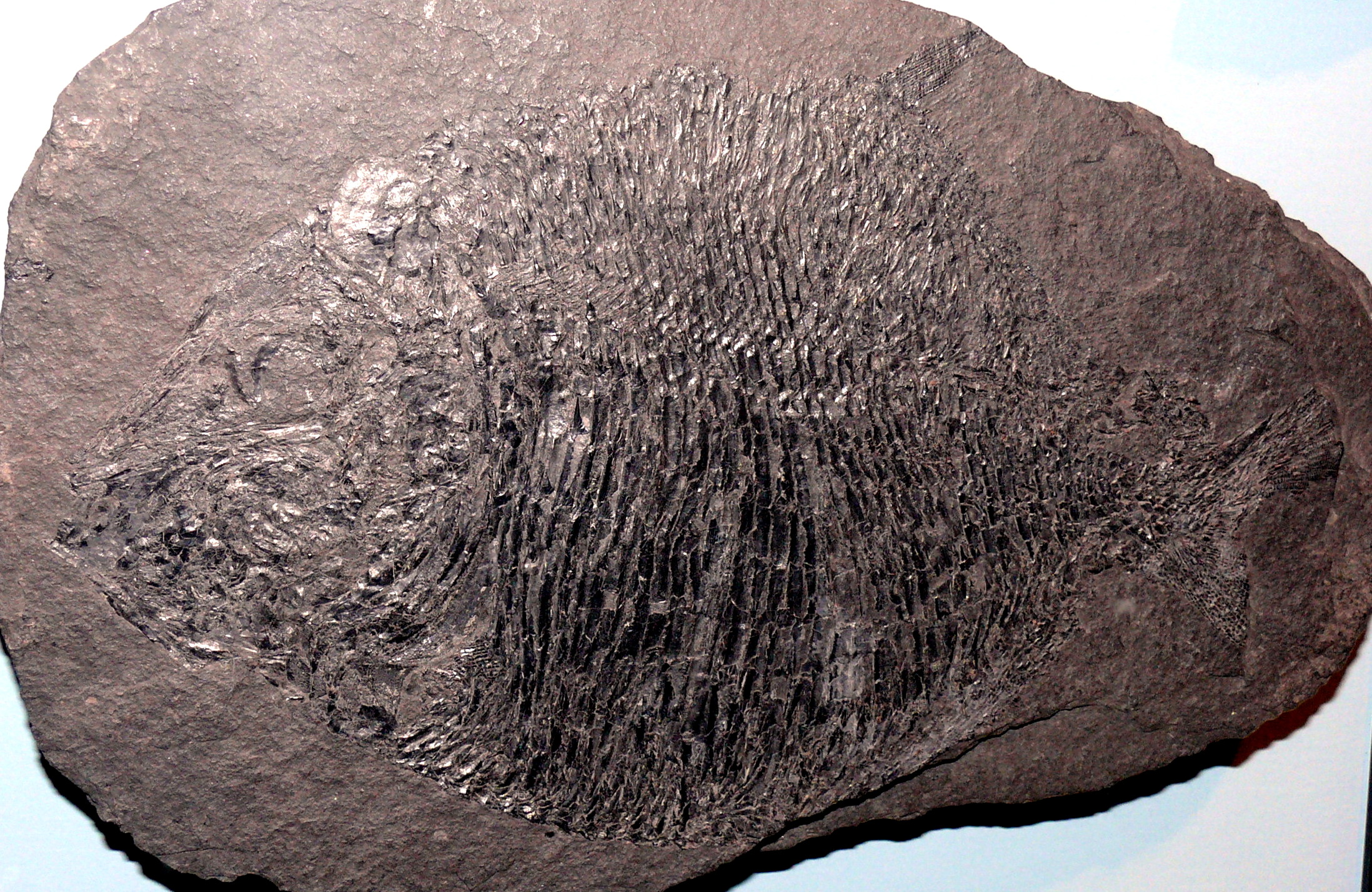
- Platysomus gibbosus

Scientific classification
- Kingdom: Animalia
- Phylum: Chordata
- Class: Actinopterygii
- Order: †Platysomiformes
- Family: †Platysomidae
- Genus: †Platysomus; Agassiz, 1833

Type species
- †Platysomus striatus Agassiz, 1833

Other species
- †Platysomus bashkirus Minich, 1992; †Platysomus biarmicus Eichwald, 1860; †Platysomus palmaris Cope, 1891; †Platysomus parvulus; †Platysomus solikamskensis Minich, 1998; †Platysomus soloduchi Minich, 1992

Synonyms
- †Schaefferichthys Dalquest, 1966

= Platysomus =

Platysomus Temporal range: Early Carboniferous–Late Permian

Extinct genus of fishes

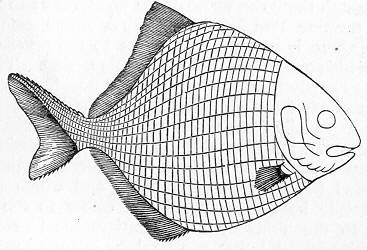
Platysomus gibbosus

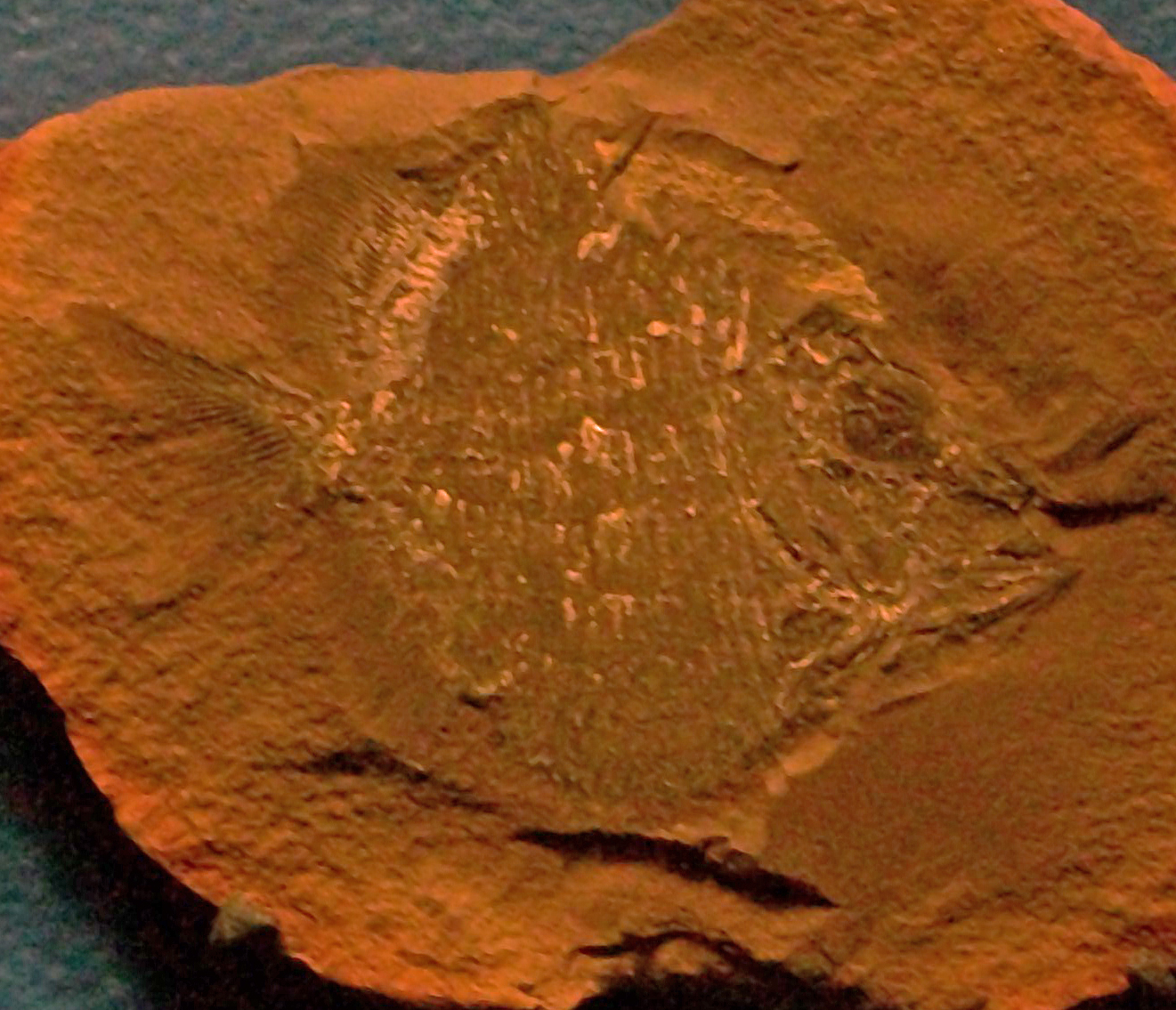
Fossil of Platysomus circularis in the Field Museum of Natural History, Chicago

Platysomus (from Greek: πλατύς platys, 'broad' and Greek: σῶμα sôma 'body') is an extinct genus of ray-finned fish that lived in the Carboniferous and Permian periods. Fossils have been found worldwide.

Platysomus was about 18 centimetres (7.1 in) long, and shaped similarly to the discus fish, having the same flattened body and elongated dorsal and anal fins. Its jaws were placed vertically under the braincase, giving it a wide gape. Platysomus is thought to have fed on plankton, and lived in both fresh and salt water.
