= Errol White =

British geologist (1901–1985)

Errol Ivor White
- Born: 30 June 1901; London
- Died: 11 January 1985 (aged 83); London
- Occupation: Palaeontologist
- Awards: Murchison Medal; Linnean Gold Medal

Errol Ivor White CBE FRS FLS FGS (30 June 1901 – 11 January 1985) was a British geologist who was president of the Ray Society from 1956 to 1959 and president of the Linnean Society of London from 1964 to 1967.

White was educated at Highgate School and King's College London (Tennant Prizeman). In 1922 he joined the Geology Department of the Natural History Museum under Arthur Smith Woodward. He became Woodward's deputy in 1939.

White was elected a Fellow of the Royal Society in 1956. He was awarded the Murchison Medal in 1962 and the Linnean Gold Medal in 1970.

== Legacy ==
A genus of Devonian arthrodire placoderm fish, Errolosteus, a genus of Carboniferous actinopterygian fish, Whiteichthys, a genus of Triassic ray-finned fish, Errolichthys, a genus of Triassic actinistian fish, Whiteia, and two Eocene genera of teleost fish, Whitapodus and Whitephippus, are named in his honour.
