= Gyrolepidoides =

Gyrolepidoides Temporal range: Middle to Late Triassic

Scientific classification
- Kingdom: Animalia
- Phylum: Chordata
- Class: Actinopterygii
- Genus: †Gyrolepidoides; Cabrera, 1944

species
- G. cuyanus Cabrera, 1944; G. multistriatus Rusconi, 1948

Extinct genus of fishes

Gyrolepidoides is an extinct genus of dubious prehistoric freshwater bony fish that lived during the Late Triassic epoch in what is now Argentina. It is known from two species, both of which are known from extremely fragmentary associated remains that cannot be confidently assigned to a particular taxon, and are thus nomina dubia.

The following species are known:

- G. cuyanus Cabrera, 1944 - Late Triassic (Norian) of Argentina (Cacheuta Formation)
- G. multistriatus Rusconi, 1948 - mid-late Triassic of Argentina (Agua de Zorra Formation)

The fragmentary remains of both Gyrolepidoides species closely resemble each other in scale morphology. They may be potentially conspecific with Challaia due to the close similarities in scales, but this is not definite.

== See also ==
- Prehistoric fish
- List of prehistoric bony fish
