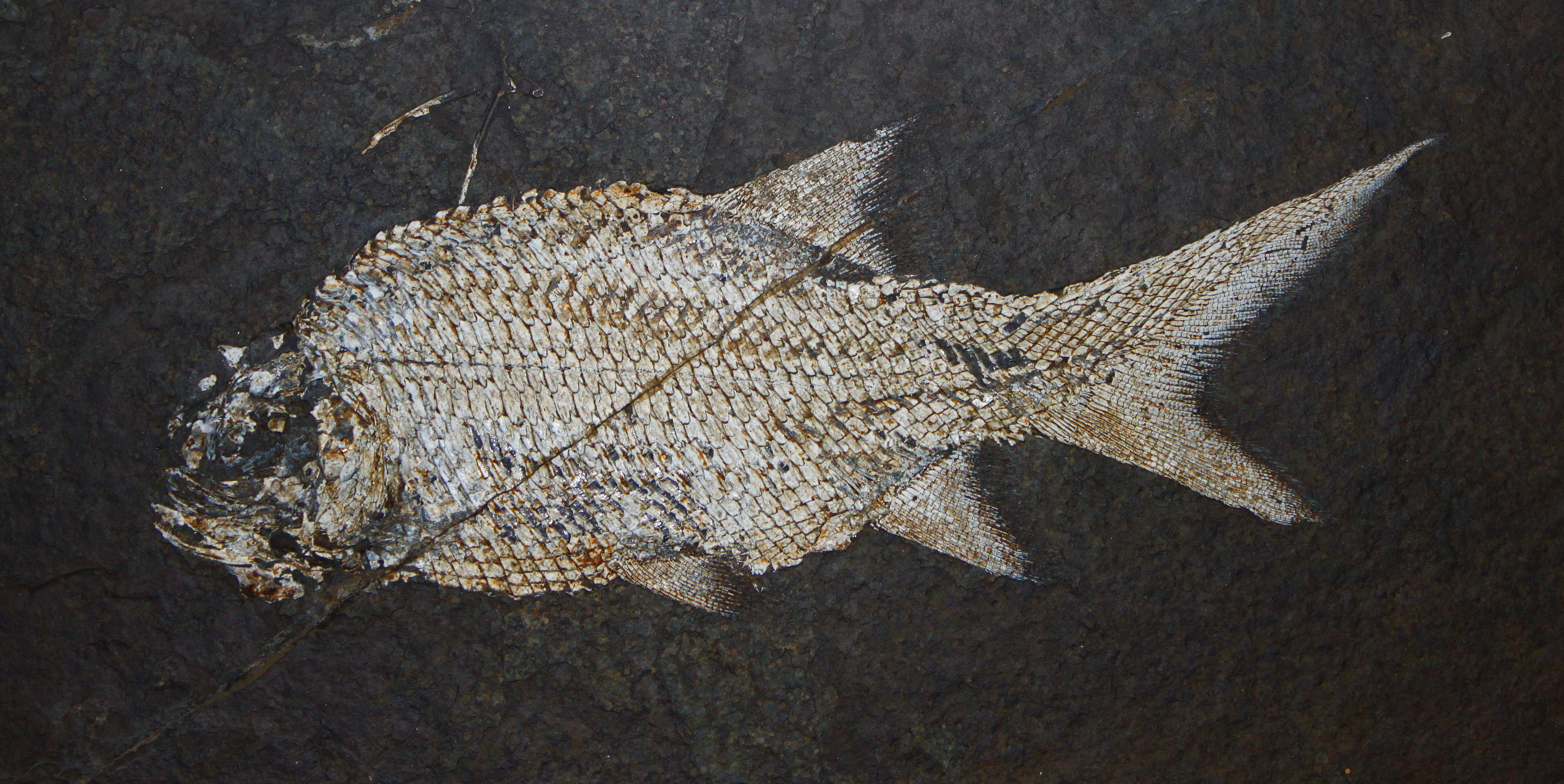
- Paramblypterus species, Carboniferous, Germany

Scientific classification
- Domain: Eukaryota
- Kingdom: Animalia
- Phylum: Chordata
- Class: Actinopterygii
- Genus: †Paramblypterus; Blot, 1966

= Paramblypterus =

Paramblypterus Temporal range: Carboniferous–Permian

Extinct genus of fishes

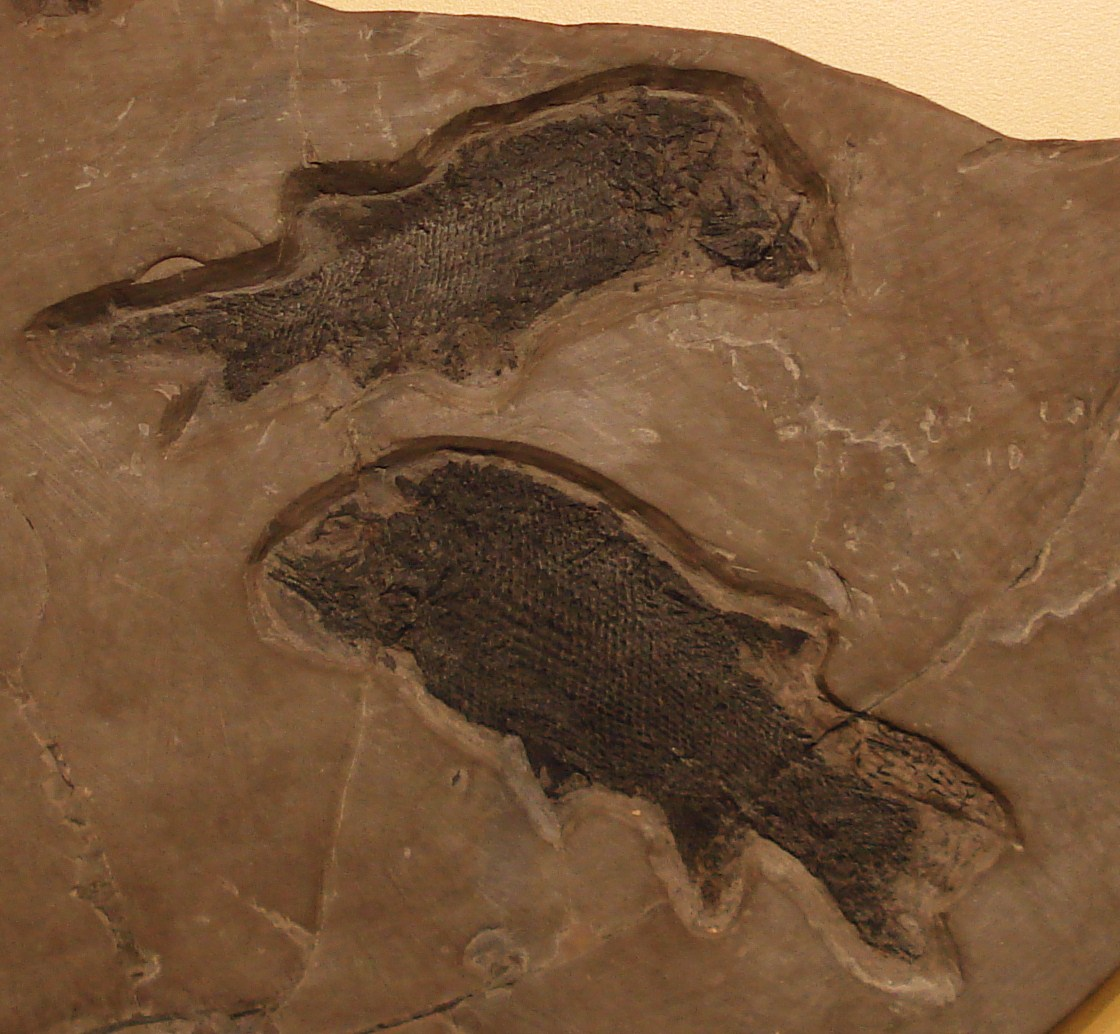
Pair

Paramblypterus is an extinct genus of Paleozoic bony fish. This taxon would often fall under predation from Paleozoic tetrapods such as Sclerocephalus

== See also ==
- Prehistoric fish
- List of prehistoric bony fish
