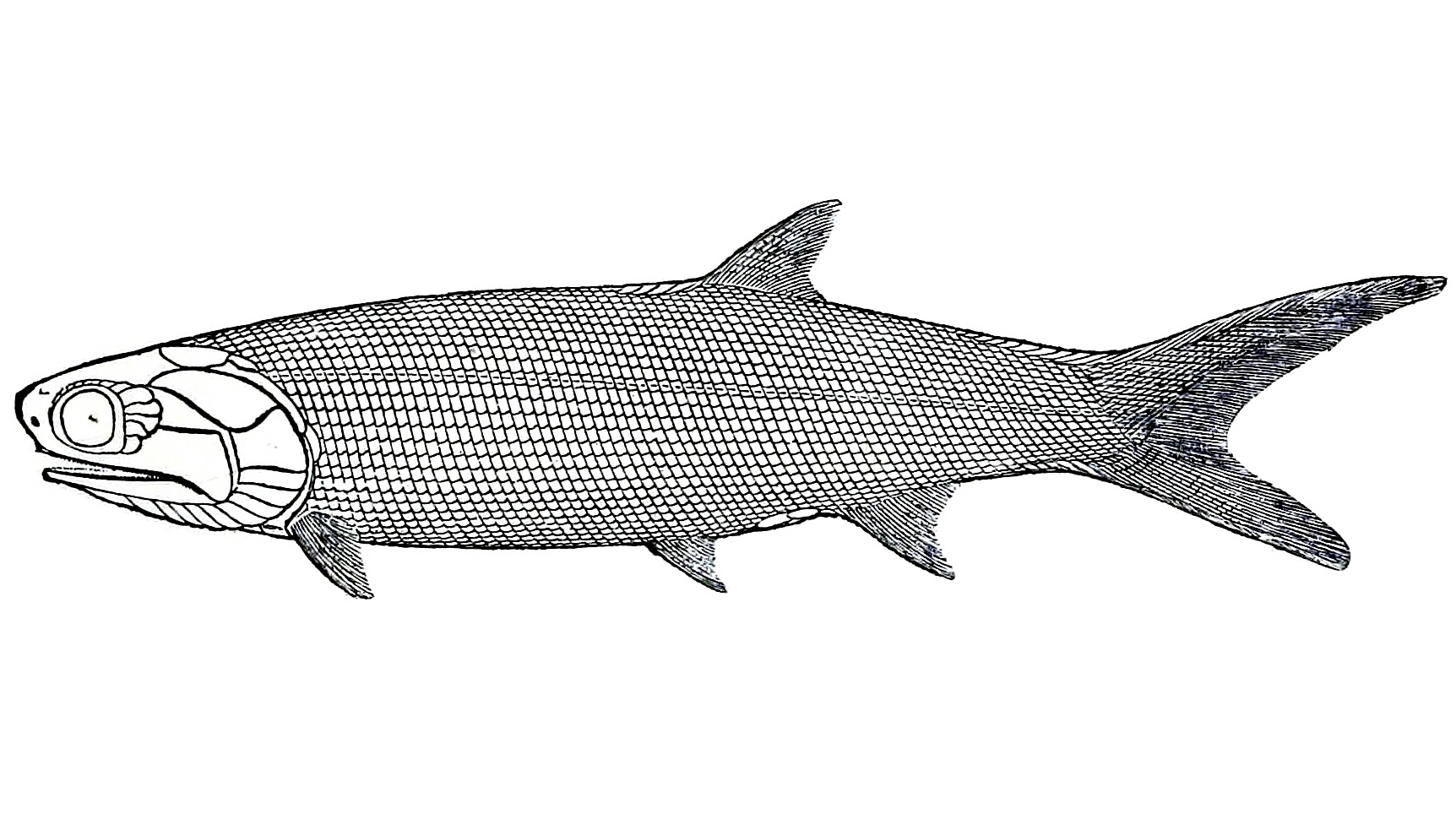
- †Palaeoniscum restoration

Scientific classification
- Kingdom: Animalia
- Phylum: Chordata
- Class: Actinopterygii
- Order: †Palaeonisciformes; Hay 1902

Suborders
- †Palaeoniscoidei Berg 1937; †Platysomoidei Berg 1937

Synonyms
- Palaeoniscida Moy-Thomas & Miles 1971

= Palaeoniscoid =

Palaeoniscoid Temporal range: Late Silurian–Cretaceous

Extinct order of fishes

Palaeoniscoids (also spelled paleoniscoid, or alternatively paleoniscids) are an extinct grouping of primitive ray-finned fish (Actinopterygii), spanning from the Silurian/Devonian to the Cretaceous. Though often assigned to their own order, the Palaeonisciformes (or superorder Palaeoniscimorpha), they are generally considered paraphyletic, but their exact relationships to living ray-finned fish are uncertain. While some and perhaps most palaeoniscoids likely belong to the stem-group of Actinopteryii (less closely related to modern ray-finned fish groups than all modern ray-finned fish are to each other) it has been suggested that some may belong to the crown group, with some of these possibly related to Cladistia (containing bichirs) and/or Chondrostei (which contains sturgeons and paddlefish). Many palaeoniscoids share a conservative body shape and a similar arrangement of skull bones, though paleoniscoids as a whole exhibit considerable diversity in body shape.

== Historic background ==
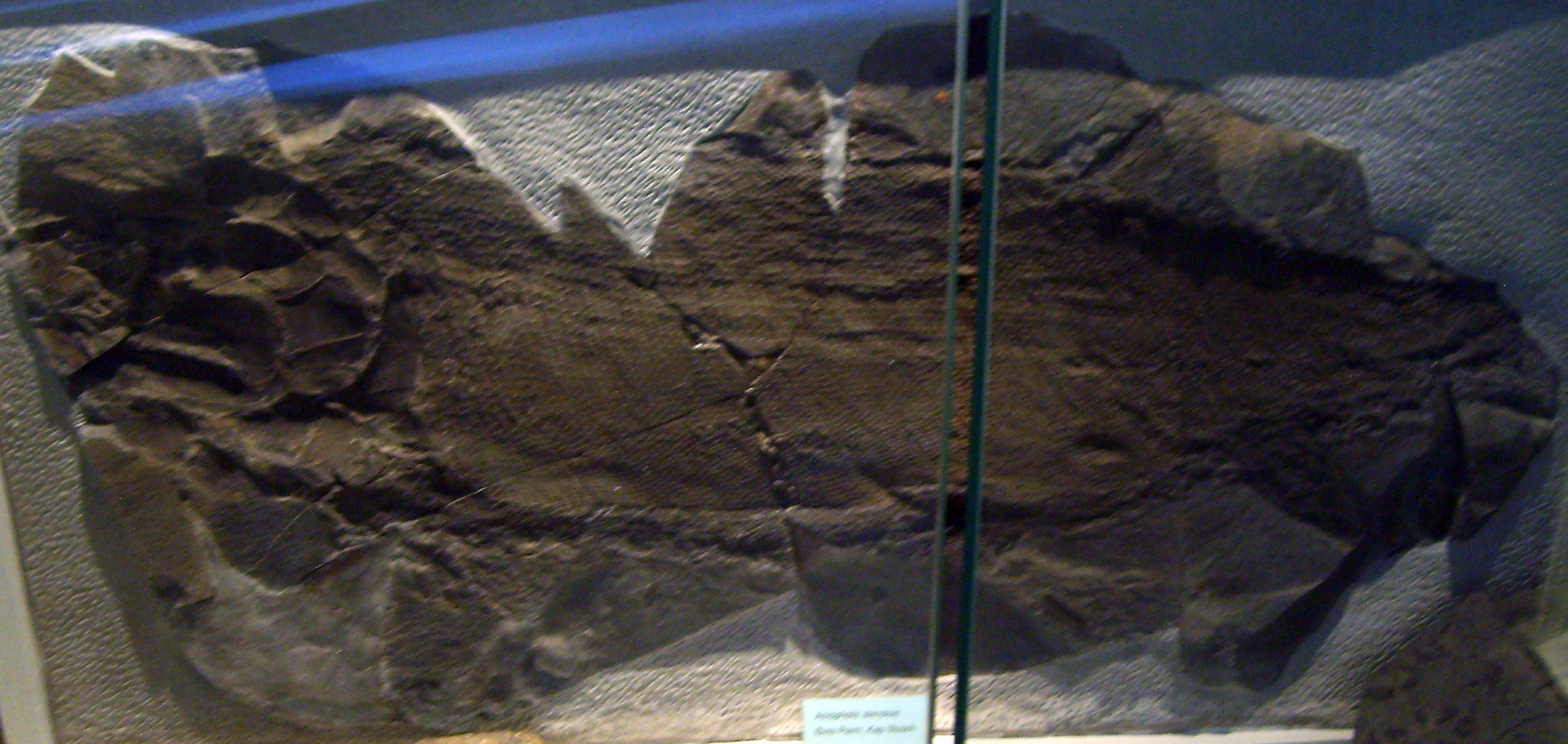
Acropholis stensioei (fossil at the Geological Museum in Copenhagen) is a taxon referred to Palaeonisciformes based on superficial resemblance with Palaeoniscum

The systematics of fossil and extant fishes has puzzled ichthyologists since the time of Louis Agassiz, who first grouped all Palaeozoic ray-finned fishes together with Chondrostei (sturgeons, paddlefishes), gars, lungfishes, and acanthodians in his Ganoidei. Carl Hermann Müller later proposed to divide actinopterygians into three groups: Chondrostei, Holostei, and Teleostei. Later, Edward Drinker Cope included these three groups within Actinopteri. The same classification is also used today, though the definitions of these groups have changed significantly over the years. The sister group to Actinopteri are the Cladistia, which include Polypterus (bichirs), Erpetoichthys and their fossil relatives. All together are grouped as Actinopterygii.

A few additional classification schemes were proposed over the years. Lev Berg erected the superorder Palaeonisci, in which he included early actinopterygians that belonged to neither Chondrostei nor Polypteri (Cladistia). Mostly following Berg, Jean-Pierre Lehman grouped the Actinopterygii into 26 orders, among others the Palaeonisciformes with the two suborders Palaeoniscoidei and Platysomoidei.

Numerous genera of early actinopterygians have been referred to either Palaeonisciformes or to one of its suborders based on superficial resemblance with either Palaeoniscum (Palaeoniscoidei) or Platysomus (Platysomoidei), especially during the early and middle parts of the 20th century. Palaeonisciformes, Palaeoniscoidei, and Platysomoidei have therefore become wastebasket taxa. They are not natural groups, but instead paraphyletic assemblages of the early members of several ray-finned fish lineages. Palaeoniscoidei have traditionally encompassed most Paleozoic actinopterygians, except those that exhibit atypical body forms (such as the deep-bodied Platysomoidei, or those assigned securely to any of the living groups of ray-finned fishes. The same can also be said about the family Palaeoniscidae sensu lato, to which several genera not closely related to Palaeoniscum have been referred in the past.

The grouping of "palaeonisciforms" was based largely on shared plesiomorphic features, such as the forward position of the eye, the large gape or the presence of rhombic scales. However, such symplesiomorphies are not informative with regard to phylogeny, but rather an indication of common ancestry. In modern biology, taxonomists group taxa based on shared apomorphies (synapomorphies) in order to detect monophyletic groups (natural groups). They use computer software (e.g., PAUP) to determine the most likely evolutionary relationships between taxa, thereby putting previous hypotheses of such relationships to the test. As a consequence, many genera have been subsequently removed from Palaeonisciformes and referred to distinct orders (e.g., Saurichthyiformes).

The term Palaeonisciformes has mostly disappeared from the modern literature or is nowadays only used to refer to the "primitive" morphology of a taxon (e.g., "palaeonisciform skull shape" or "palaeoniscoid body shape"). In order to make the Paleonisciformes, Palaeoniscoidei or Palaeoniscidae monophyletic, these terms should only be used in a strict sense, i.e., when referring to the clade of actinopterygians that includes Palaeoniscum and the taxa closely related to it.

A monophyletic clade including several taxa classically referred to the Palaeonisciformes (e.g., Aesopichthys, Birgeria, Boreosomus, Canobius, Pteronisculus, Rhadinichthys) was recovered in the cladistic analysis by Lund et al. This clade, coined Palaeoniscimorpha, is also used in subsequent publications. Recent cladistic analyses also recovered clades containing several genera that have historically been grouped within Palaeonisciformes, while excluding others. Due to the delicate nature of fossils of ray-finned fishes and the incomplete knowledge of several taxa (especially with regard to the internal cranial anatomy), there is still no consensus about the evolutionary relationships of several early actinopterygians previously grouped within Palaeonisciformes.

In a 2026 study determining the interrelationships of early ray-finned fish, a monophyletic clade comprising the vast majority of "palaeoniscoid" fish (in addition to several other groups) from the Late Devonian to the earliest Triassic was identified, and described as the new clade Permocarbonimorpha. This group was identified as the sister group to all extant actinopterygians.

== Classification ==
The following list includes species that have been referred to Palaeonisciformes (or Palaeoniscidae, respectively), usually because of superficial resemblance with Palaeoniscum freieslebeni. Many of these species are poorly known and have never been included in any cladistic analysis. Their inclusion in Palaeonisciformes (or Palaeoniscidae) is in most cases doubtful and requires confirmation by cladistic studies. Which taxa should be included in Palaeonisciformes sensu stricto (or Palaeoniscidae sensu stricto) and which ones moved to other orders or families, respectively, is a matter of ongoing research.

- Order †Palaeonisciformes Hay, 1902 sensu stricto [Palaeoniscida Moy-Thomas & Miles, 1971]
  - Family †Palaeoniscidae Vogt, 1852
    - Genus ?†Agecephalichthys Wade, 1935
      - Species †Agecephalichthys granulatus Wade, 1935
    - Genus ?†Atherstonia Woodward, 18989 [Broometta Chabakov, 1927]
      - Species †Atherstonia scutata Woodward, 1889 [Atherstonia cairncrossi Broom, 1913; Amblypterus capensis Broom, 1913; Broometta cairncrossi Chabakov, 1927]
      - Species †Atherstonia minor Woodward, 1893
    - Genus ?†Cryphaeiolepis Traquair, 1881
      - Species †Cryphaeiolepis scutata Traquair, 1881
    - Genus ?†Cteniolepidotrichia Poplin & Su, 1992
      - Species †Cteniolepidotrichia turfanensis Poplin & Su, 1992
    - Genus †Dicellopyge Brough, 1931
      - Species †Dicellopyge macrodentata Brough, 1931
      - Species †Dicellopyge lissocephalus Brough, 1931
    - Genus ?†Duwaichthys Liu et al., 1990
      - Species †Duwaichthys mirabilis Liu et al., 1990
    - Genus ?†Ferganiscus Sytchevskaya & Yakolev, 1999
      - Species †Ferganiscus osteolepis Sytchevskaya & Yakolev, 1999
    - Genus †Gyrolepis Agassiz, 1833 non Kade, 1858
      - Species †G. albertii Agassiz, 1833
      - Species †G. gigantea Agassiz, 1833
      - Species †G. maxima Agassiz, 1833
      - Species †G. quenstedti Dames, 1888
      - Species †G. tenuistriata Agassiz, 1833
    - Genus †Gyrolepidoides Cabrera, 1944
      - Species †G. creyanus Schaeffer, 1955
      - Species †G. cuyanus Cabrera, 1944
      - Species †G. multistriatus Rusconi, 1948
    - Genus ?†Palaeoniscinotus Rohon, 1890
      - Species †P. czekanowskii Rohon, 1890
    - Genus †Palaeoniscum de Blainville, 1818 [Palaeoniscus Agassiz, 1833 non Von Meyer, 1858; Palaeoniscas Rzchak, 1881; Eupalaeoniscus Rzchak, 1881; Palaeomyzon Weigelt, 1930; Geomichthys Sauvage, 1888]
      - Species †P. angustum (Rzehak, 1881) [Palaeoniscas angustus Rzehak, 1881]
      - Species †P. antipodeum (Egerton, 1864) [Palaeoniscus antipodeus Egerton, 1864]
      - Species †P. antiquum Williams, 1886
      - Species †P. arenaceum Berger, 1832
      - Species †P. capense (Bloom, 1913) [Palaeoniscus capensis Bloom, 1913]
      - Species †P. comtum (Agassiz, 1833) [Palaeoniscus comtus Agassiz, 1833]
      - Species †P. daedalium Yankevich & Minich, 1998
      - Species †P. devonicum Clarke, 1885
      - Species †P. elegans (Sedgwick, 1829) [Palaeoniscus elegans Sedgwick, 1829]
      - Species †P. freieslebeni de Blainville, 1818 [Eupalaeoniscus freieslebeni (de Brainville, 1818); Palaeoniscus freieslebeni (de Brainville, 1818)]
      - Species †P. hassiae (Jaekel, 1898) [Galeocerdo contortus hassiae Jaekel, 1898; Palaeomyzon hassiae (Jaekel, 1898)]
      - Species †P. kasanense Geinitz & Vetter, 1880
      - Species †P. katholitzkianum (Rzehak, 1881) [Palaeoniscas katholitzkianus Rzehak, 1881]
      - Species †P. landrioti (le Sauvage, 1890) [Palaeoniscus landrioti le Sauvage, 1890]
      - Species †P. longissimum (Agassiz, 1833) [Palaeoniscus longissimus Agassiz, 1833]
      - Species †P. macrophthalmum (McCoy, 1855) [Palaeoniscus macrophthalmus McCoy, 1855]
      - Species †P. magnum (Woodward, 1937) [Palaeoniscus magnus Woodward, 1937]
      - Species †P. moravicum (Rzehak, 1881) [Palaeoniscas moravicus Rzehak, 1881]
      - Species †P. promtu (Rzehak, 1881) [Palaeoniscas promtus Rzehak, 1881]
      - Species †P. reticulatum Williams, 1886
      - Species †P. scutigerum Newberry, 1868
      - Species †P. vratislavensis (Agassiz, 1833) [Palaeoniscus vratislavensis Agassiz, 1833]
    - Genus †Palaeothrissum de Blainville, 1818
      - Species †P. elegans Sedgwick, 1829
      - Species †P. macrocephalum de Blainville, 1818
      - Species †P. magnum de Blainville, 1818
    - Genus ?†Shuniscus Su, 1983
      - Species †Shuniscus longianalis Su, 1983
    - Genus ?†Suchonichthys Minich, 2001
      - Species †Suchonichthys molini Minich, 2001
    - Genus ?†Trachelacanthus Fischer De Waldheim, 1850
      - Species †Trachelacanthus stschurovskii Fischer De Waldheim, 1850
    - Genus ?†Triassodus Su, 1984
      - Species †Triassodus yanchangensis Su, 1984
    - Genus ?†Turfania Liu & Martínez, 1973
      - Species †T. taoshuyuanensis Liu & Martínez, 1973
      - Species †T. varta Wang, 1979
    - Genus ?†Turgoniscus Jakovlev, 1968
      - Species †Turgoniscus reissi Jakovlev, 1968
    - Genus ?†Weixiniscus Su & Dezao, 1994
      - Species †Weixiniscus microlepis Su & Dezao, 1994
    - Genus ?†Xingshikous Liu, 1988
      - Species †Xingshikous xishanensis Liu, 1988
    - Genus ?†Yaomoshania Poplin et al., 1991
      - Species †Yaomoshania minutosquama Poplin et al., 1991
  - Brachydegma

=== Other families attributed to Palaeonisciformes ===
This list includes families that at one time or another were placed in the order Palaeonisciformes. The species included in these families are often poorly known, and a close relationship with the family Palaeoniscidae is therefore doubtful unless confirmed by cladistic analyses. These families are therefore better treated as Actinopterygii incertae sedis for the time being. The evolutionary relationships of early actinopterygians is a matter of ongoing studies.

- †Acropholidae Kazantseva-Selezneva, 1977
- †Atherstoniidae Gardiner, 1969
- †Brazilichthyidae Cox & Hutchinson, 1991
- †Centrolepididae Gardier, 1960
- †Coccolepididae Berg, 1940 corrig.
- †Commentryidae Gardiner, 1963
- †Cryphiolepididae MoyThomas, 1939 corrig.
- †Dwykiidae Gardiner, 1969
- †Holuridae Moy-Thomas, 1939
- †Igornichthyidae Heyler, 1977
- †Irajapintoseidae Beltan, 1978
- †Monesedeiphidae Beltan, 1989
- †Moythomasiidae Kazantseva, 1971
- †Rhabdolepididae Gardiner, 1963
- †Stegotrachelidae Gardiner, 1963
- †Thrissonotidae Berg, 1955
- †Tienshaniscidae Lu & Chen, 2010
- †Turseodontidae Bock, 1959 corrig.
- †Uighuroniscidae Jin, 1996
- †Urosthenidae Woodward, 1931

== Timeline of genera ==
Andreolepis hedei, previously grouped within Palaeonisciformes, has proven so far to be the earliest-known actinopterygiian, living around 420 million years ago (Late Silurian in Russia, Sweden, Estonia, and Latvia. Actinopterygians underwent an extensive diversification during the Carboniferous, after the end-Devonian Hangenberg extinction.
