= Besano Formation =

Geological formation in Italy and Switzerland

- Stratigraphic range: Late Anisian (Illyrian)–Early Ladinian (Fassanian); ~242 Ma
- Type: Geological formation
- Underlies: San Giorgio Dolomite
- Overlies: Lower San Salvatore Dolomite

Lithology
- Primary: Dolomite, shale

Location
- Coordinates: 45.9°N 8.9°E
- Approximate paleocoordinates: 7.5°N 21.0°E
- Region: Lombardy, Piedmont, Ticino
- Country: Italy; Switzerland
- Extent: Southwestern Limestone Alps

Type section
- Named for: Besano
- Besano Formation (Switzerland) Besano Formation (Italy)

The Besano Formation is a geological formation in the southern Alps of northwestern Italy and southern Switzerland. This formation, a thin but fossiliferous succession of dolomite and black shale, is famous for its preservation of Middle Triassic (Anisian–Ladinian) marine life including fish and aquatic reptiles. It is exposed in the Monte San Giorgio and Besano area. It is among the formations responsible for the area being designated as a UNESCO World Heritage Site. In Switzerland, it is also known as the Grenzbitumenzone. The Anisian-Ladinian boundary lies in the upper part of the Besano Formation.

== Geology ==
=== General geology ===
The formation is a relatively thin band of dark dolomite and shale, approximately 5 to 16 metres (16 to 52 ft) in total thickness. It extends about 10 kilometres (6.2 mi) from east to west along the northern edge of Monte San Giorgio and across the Swiss-Italian border towards Besano. In individual outcrops, the Grenzbitumenzone overlies the lower part of San Salvatore Dolomite, a thick and widespread carbonate-rich formation. The later parts of the San Salvatore Formation, exposed north of Monte San Giorgio, are partially isochronous with the Grenzbitumenzone (formed at the same time). At its upper extent, the Grenzbitumenzone grades into the San Giorgio Dolomite, a formation with fewer fossils and a lower concentration of organic matter. The San Giorgio Dolomite itself is succeeded by the fossil-rich Meride Limestone.

As its name indicates, the sediments of the formation are bituminous, rich in organic matter to the point that they burn readily. Grey laminated (finely-layered) dolomite with about 20% organic matter comprises the majority of the formation. The width of laminae in these dolomite layers vary widely from sub-millimeter to sub-centimeter scales, as a function of mineral or grain size variation. Invertebrate fossils and isolated quartz grains are common in the dolomite, while vertebrates and radiolarian molds are preserved less often. Finely-laminated black shale with up to 40% organic matter makes up a smaller portion. Radiolarians and vertebrate fossils are common in the shale. However, invertebrates are practically absent, and crystals of dolomite and detrital quartz are rare. These major dolomite or shale layers show very little evidence of bioturbation or disturbance. Pyrite is present but uncommon, likely a consequence of low iron availability. The organic matter can be characterized as type II kerogen, enriched in hopane and porphyrin compounds, though strongly depleted in Carbon-13. These biomarkers, when combined, indicate that most of the organic material was derived from cyanobacteria.

Other sediments and rock types are uncommon in the formation. Thin layers of fine-grained laminated dolomite with a white color extend over a wide area. They have very little organic matter and instead contain shell fragments and peloids. This white dolomite likely represents distal turbidite deposits, collapsed from nearby carbonate sources. A similar origin is inferred for massive (unbedded) dolomite layers, which have a porous texture and heterogenous grain sizes. There is some evidence of reworking, as thin dolomite layers rarely show wavy layering or are ripped up into clasts by deep currents. The black shale layers occasionally preserve bands of chert, derived from radiolarian blooms. Numerous narrow bentonite layers (volcanic tuffs) occur throughout the formation. They are mostly composed of illite and montmorillonite, with occasional crystals of sanidine. Unlike most Triassic tuffs from the Southern Alps, plagioclase crystals are completely absent.

=== Palaeoenvironment ===
The formation is representative of a small intraplatform basin, a deep and stable marine environment which would have been positioned among shallow-water reefs and carbonate platforms. The carbonate platforms themselves are preserved in thick sequences, such as the San Salvatore Dolomite further north and west, and the Esino Limestone further east. The Grenzbitumenzone basin may be up to 20 km wide, if the Perledo-Varenna Formation east of Lake Como also belongs to the basin. This system of carbonate platforms and basins developed along a western tongue of the Tethys Ocean, which transgressed eastwards during the Middle Triassic.

Alternations between dolomite and shale in the Grenzbitumenzone are probably a consequence of sea level fluctuations. Raised sea levels would have submerged the carbonate platforms, which may have enhanced dolomite deposition in the basin. Alternatively, it would have connected the basin to other nutrient-rich areas, leading to phytoplankton blooms and thus more shale deposition. Laminations within dolomite layers correspond to fluctuating carbonate levels, possibly linked to runoff from carbonate platforms during storms.

The sediments of the Grenzbitumenzone are undisturbed by benthic (seabed-living) organisms, while well-preserved fossils, organic matter, and heavy metal ions are prevalent. This evidence supports the traditional view that the seabed of the basin was completely anoxic – stagnant, oxygen-deprived, and lifeless. However, abundant fossils of nektonic (swimming) and planktonic (free-floating) life indicate that oxygen was more concentrated in seawater closer to the surface. There has been debate over the origin or intensity of this strong stratification in oxygen content. The basin, though relatively deep, was likely too shallow for stratification via deep saline currents or a strong temperature gradient. The traditional view places blame on a concentration of planktonic bacteria at mid-level in the water column, dividing an oxic upper part of the basin from the anoxic lower part. There is little evidence for microbial activity on the seabed during the deposition of the Grenzbitumenzone.

Later studies have argued that the seabed could have been dysoxic – with low oxygen levels, though still greater than in anoxic waters. Among the most common fossils belong to Daonella, a bivalve with strong debate over its habitat preferences. Early studies argued that it was pseudoplanktonic (attached to floating objects) or washed in from shallower areas, congruent with an anoxic Grenzbitumenzone seabed. However, Daonella is now believed to have lived in place at the bottom of the basin, specializing in a dysoxic environment inhospitable to most other benthic animals. Disarticulation and reorientation of Grenzbitumenzone fossils have favored the presence of weak and oxygenated bottom currents. Early evidence for bottom currents was controversial and perhaps based on a misdrawn illustration, but further specimen sampling supports the same general conclusion.

=== Taphonomy ===
Grenzbitumenzone fossils are usually well-preserved, but most are compressed between sediment layers. Compaction is much more pronounced in the thin shale layers than the thicker dolomite layers. Soft tissue preservation is rare but not unheard of: it includes calcified shark cartilage, phosphatized coprolites and gut contents, and organic remnants of reptile scales. In a dysoxic environment, preservation may have been facilitated by bacterial mats, adhering and sealing a skeleton onto the substrate. However, direct evidence for bacterial mats is not present.

Two ways to quantify a skeleton's preservation are completeness (the proportion of a skeleton present in a fossil) and articulation (the proportion of a skeleton preserved in life position). The completeness and articulation of Serpianosaurus fossils are variable, though are fairly high on average. The two factors are most clearly linked in the head, a heavy part of the skeleton which is most likely to sink first, detaching from the rest of a floating body. Even so, headless and relatively incomplete specimens are rare, so bodies are unlikely to fall apart while floating for an extended period. The vertebrae and ribs tend to be disarticulated, though only over a short distance. Peripheral elements such as the toes are also prone to disarticulation. Disarticulation is probably a result of subtle deep-water currents, during a long period of slow decay on the seabed. Heads and tails tend to curve in the same direction, which may be a consequence of current flow.

Saurichthys fossils of the Grenzbitumenzone are often well-preserved, though disarticulated and twisted specimens are more common than in the Cassina beds of the Meride Limestone. This may be due to the low sedimentation rate of the Grenzbitumenzone relative to the Meride Limestone, providing more time for the influence of bottom currents prior to burial. The Cassina beds also have more direct evidence for microbial mats, which could have played a role in stabilizing decaying carcasses.

Conversely, ichthyosaur fossils of the Grenzbitumenzone tend to have higher completeness than those found in Early Jurassic formations elsewhere in Europe. There is no specific region of the body with significantly lower completeness, arguing that the fossils were unaffected by preferential scavenging. Fossil completeness may have been enhanced by the relatively small and isolated nature of the Grenzbitumenzone basin, protected from the influence of stronger marine currents.

== Paleobiota ==
The largest collections of fossils from the Besano Fomration are housed by the Natural History Museum of the University of Zurich, the Civic Museum of Fossils of Besano, the Cantonal Museum of Natural History of Lugano and a local museum in Meride.

=== Reptiles ===
==== Archosauromorpha ====
Archosauromorphs of the Besano Formation
Genus	Species	Notes	Images
Macrocnemus	M. bassanii	A fairly common basal tanystropheid up to 1.2 m (3.9 ft) in length. It was an agile and terrestrial carnivore or insectivore, superficially similar (but unrelated) to monitor lizards, with a low skull, large eyes, a slender form, and a shorter neck than more derived tanystropheids. Like some living lizards, it may have been capable of running bipedally, thanks to its long tail and large hindlimbs. Known from multiple specimens, including nearly complete skeletons.	
Macrocnemus	M. cf. fuyuanensis	A rare terrestrial basal tanystropheid. Only known from a disarticulated skeleton (PIMUZ T 1559) which is more similar to Macrocnemus fuyuanensis from the Zhuganpo Formation of China, rather than Macrocnemus bassanii.	
Tanystropheus	T. hydroides	A large and fairly common tanystropheid with presumably semiaquatic habits. Previously considered an adult form ("large morphotype") of Tanystropheus longobardicus, but differentiated in 2020 according to histological work and distinctive skull characteristics, such as a flattened form and a "fish-trap" of long interlocking fangs. One of the largest known non-archosaur archosauromorphs, up to 5.25 metres (17.2 feet) in total length, around half of which is neck. Known from multiple specimens, including nearly complete skeletons.	
Tanystropheus	T. longobardicus	A small and common tanystropheid with presumably semiaquatic habits. When first described in the 1880s, it was misidentified as a pterosaur ("Tribelesodon"), but the discovery of more fossils in the 1920s allowed it to be recognized as a long-necked reptile instead. Significantly smaller than T. hydroides, at less than 2 metres (6.6 feet) in length, with a more triangular skull and tricuspid (three-pointed) teeth in the back of the jaw. Known from many specimens, including nearly complete skeletons.	
Ticinosuchus	T. ferox	A pseudosuchian (crocodile-line) archosaur, one of the few terrestrial reptiles preserved in the formation. It was a large quadrupedal predator, primarily known from a complete skeleton (PIMUZ T 4779) reaching a length of 2.5 m (8.2 ft). Upon its initial description in 1965, it was classified among a grade of archosaurs historically known as "rauisuchians". As one of the earliest "rauisuchians" known from good fossil remains (in terms of both geological age and history of study), it served to illucidate their anatomy and relation to enigmatic Chirotherium footprints. Ticinosuchus is currently considered a very close relative to Paracrocodylomorpha, the group of suchians encompassing other "rauisuchians" and their descendants, the crocodylomorphs.	

==== Ichthyosauria ====
Ichthyosaurs of the Besano Formation
Genus	Species	Notes	Images
Besanosaurus	B. leptorhynchus	A large merriamosaurian ichthyosaur, with a maximum length of around 8 meters (26 ft). Its skull was relatively small but also extremely thin, suggesting that fish or squid may have been its primary prey. Besanosaurus is sometimes labelled as a "shastasaurid" due to its body form and position in ichthyosaur evolution, though its relations to other "shastasaurids" is not fully resolved. Known from multiple specimens, including nearly complete skeletons. Some smaller specimens were formerly named as Mikadocephalus gracilirostris, a species which is now generally regarded as a junior synonym.	
Cymbospondylus	C. buchseri	A large and rare cymbospondylid ichthyosaur based on a single partial skeleton (PIMUZ T 4351) with a skull 68 cm (2 ft 3 in) in length. Though one of the largest marine predators of the Besano Formation, with an estimated total length around 5.5 m (18 ft), it was a relatively small species of Cymbospondylus. The skeleton may belong to a juvenile, indicating that it could have grown larger.	
Mixosaurus	M. cornalianus	A fairly small and common mixosaurid ichthyosaur, up to 1.5 m (4.9 ft) in length. One of the earliest marine reptiles known to develop a dorsal fin, as well as a viviparous mode of reproduction. Known from many specimens, including nearly complete skeletons.	
Mixosaurus	M. kuhnschnyderi	A small ichthyosaur based on a single specimen (PIMUZ T 1324). Initially named in its own genus, Sangiorgiosaurus.	
Phalarodon	P. sp.	A small ichthyosaur based on a single specimen (PIMUZ T 1311). Phalarodon was similar to Mixosaurus in many respects, differing primarily in its dentition. The teeth of Phalarodon were more robust, implying a more durophagous diet. Some have argued that the purported Besano Formation Phalarodon should be referred to M. kuhnschnyderi.	
Wimanius	W. odontopalatus	A small ichthyosaur based on a single specimen (GPIT 1797) with a slender skull. This skull fossil, though distinct from the skulls of Mikadocephalus, is also sometimes regarded as belonging to a juvenile Besanosaurus.	

==== Sauropterygia ====
Sauropterygians of the Besano Formation
Genus	Species	Notes	Images
Cyamodus	C. hildegardis	A medium-sized cyamodontid placodont, about 1.3 m (4.3 ft) in length. Like most other advanced placodonts, it can be characterized by a triangular skull, crushing teeth, and a broad carapace (dorsal shell) made up of interlocking armor plates.	
Eusaurosphargis	E. dalsassoi	A small and enigmatic reptile often classified near the base of Sauropterygia, potentially as a helveticosaurid. Fossils from the Besano Formation are rare and fragmentary, but a nearly complete juvenile skeleton is known from the nearby Prosanto Formation, which was deposited around the same time. It had a wide body, thin armor, and small limbs which may point towards a terrestrial or semi-aquatic lifestyle.	
Helveticosaurus	H. zollingeri	A large and uncommon helveticosaurid, an enigmatic type of reptile sometimes classified as a basal sauropterygian. It is known from a small number of fossils, including a nearly complete skeleton (PIMUZ T 4352) with a preserved length of 2.5 m (8.2 ft) and an estimated total length of 3.6 m (12 ft). This fossil shows an eclectic combination of features including a short snout, massive fang-like teeth, robust limbs, and a paddle-like tail.	
Nothosaurus	N. giganteus	A large nothosaur based on a complete skeleton with a skull 49 cm (1.61 ft) in length and a total body length of 3.8 m (12 ft). Apart from ichthyosaurs, it was likely the most massive marine predators known from the formation, and one of the largest known nothosaurs. Nothosaurs are far less common in the Besano Formation compared to succeeding layers or other European marine deposits of the Middle Triassic. The gigantic skeleton was initially given the name Paranothosaurus amsleri, but it has subsequently been referred to Nothosaurus giganteus.	
Nothosaurus	N. cf. juvenilis	A small nothosaur based on a disarticulated skeleton.	
Odoiporosaurus	O. terruzzii	A rare pachypleurosaur known from a single partial skeleton discovered in very early layers of the Besano Formation.	
Paraplacodus	P. broilii	A medium-sized basal placodont, with the most complete skeleton approaching 1.5 m (4.9 ft) in length. It had a stocky but unarmored body, a long tail, and a skull with both protruding teeth (at the front) and blunt crushing teeth (at the back). This dentition, though not as specialized as the completely flat teeth of more derived placodonts, was still well-suited for a durophagous diet.	
Serpianosaurus	S. mirigolensis	An abundant small pachypleurosaur (maximum length of 75 cm (2.46 ft)) known from numerous skeletons of varying preservation quality. One of the most distinctive and common marine reptiles of the formation. Many fossils of this species were previously lumped under "Pachypleurosaurus" edwardsii or "Phygosaurus perledicus", as the systematics of Monte San Giorgio pachypleurosaurs remained poorly resolved until 1989. Like other pachypleurosaurs, it was a slender reptile with long extremities and a semiaquatic or fully aquatic lifestyle. In younger strata exposed on Monte San Giorgio above the Besano Formation, Serpianosaurus is succeeded by several species of Neusticosaurus.	
Silvestrosaurus	S. buzzii	A fairly small lariosaurine nothosaur known from a single incomplete skeleton (PIMUZ T 2804) with a skull 8 cm (3.1 in) in length. It was originally named as a species of Lariosaurus, a nothosaur genus which is prevalent in other Middle Triassic marine deposits in the area.	

==== Thalattosauria ====
Thalattosaurs of the Besano Formation
Genus	Species	Notes	Images
Askeptosaurus	A. italicus	A medium-sized askeptosauroid, around 2.5–3 m (8.2–9.8 ft) in length. It had a long snout filled with slender homodont teeth, a long tail, and comparatively unspecialized limbs retaining claws. Known from multiple specimens, including nearly complete skeletons.	
Clarazia	C. schinzi	A rather small and rare claraziid thalattosauroid, at least 1 m (3.3 ft) in length. Known from a complete skeleton (PIMUZ T 4778) with small limbs and a robust skull bearing blunt teeth suitable for a durophagous diet.	
Hescheleria	H. rubeli	A rather small and rare claraziid thalattosauroid, around 1 m (3.3 ft) in length. Known from a disarticulated skeleton (PIMUZ T 2469), with the skull reconstructed as having an unusual downturned snout and a conical structure on the lower jaw.	

=== Fish ===
==== Sarcopterygians (lobe-finned fish) ====
Sarcopterygians of the Besano Formation
Genus	Species	Notes	Images
Holophagus?	cf. H. picenus	A large coelacanth based on scales and fragments of the skull and tail fin. It is tentatively referable to Holophagus picenus (also known as Undina picnea), a fragmentary Triassic coelacanth species described from the Dolomia Principale in the 19th century.	
Rieppelia	R. heinzfurreri	A large (63 cm (2.07 ft) long) latimeriid coelacanth. Like its sister taxon Foreyia, it was a particularly specialized member of the subfamily Ticinepomiinae, with a massive blunt-snouted skull and a relatively short body.	
Ticinepomis	T. peyeri	A small (18 cm (7.1 in) long) latimeriid coelacanth It was a rather unspecialized member of the subfamily Ticinepomiinae, lacking the unusual proportions of Foreyia and Rieppelia.	

==== Actinopterygians (ray-finned fish) ====
The actinopterygian fauna of the Besano Formation was described in detail by James Brough (1939) and Toni Bürgin (1992).

Actinopterygians of the Besano Formation
Genus	Species	Notes	Images
Aetheodontus	A. besanensis	A very small (5.5 cm (2.2 in) long) "perleidid" neopterygian with crushing-style dentition.	
Altisolepis	A. bellipinnis	A small (7 cm (2.8 in) long) "perleidid" neopterygian with deepened flank scales. Previously considered a species of Peltoperleidus.	
Altisolepis	A. elongignathus	A small "perleidid" neopterygian with deepened flank scales. Previously considered a species of Peltoperleidus.	
Besania?	B. micrognathus	A very small (4.4 cm (1.7 in) long) halecostomian neopterygian with deepened flank scales, provenance uncertain.	
Birgeria	B. stensioei	A predatory and pelagic birgeriid chondrostean, by far the largest actinopterygian in the formation. The best-preserved skeleton from the Besano Formation (and the best fossil of the entire genus) was around 1.2 m (3.9 ft) in length, though even larger specimens could reach 2 m (6.6 ft).	
Bobasatrania	B. ceresiensis	A medium-sized and deep-bodied bobasatraniiform chondrostean.	
Cephaloxenus	C. macropterus	A small (10 cm (3.9 in) long) peltopleuriform neopterygian with deepened flank scales.	
Cephaloxenus	C. squamiserratus	A small peltopleuriform neopterygian	
Colobodus	C. bassanii	A large colobodontid neopterygian up to 70 cm (2.3 ft) in length. It was a strongly-built and durophagous fish, with crushing-style dentition for eating hard-shelled invertebrates. Some sources have suggested that Colobodus is a wastebasket taxon which should be split into multiple genera and species.	
Crenilepis	C. "divaricatus"	A large colobodontid neopterygian similar to Colobodus, if not synonymous.	
Ctenognathichthys	C. bellottii	A medium-sized (17 cm (6.7 in) long) "perleidiform" neopterygian with grasping-style dentition.	
Eoeugnathus	E. megalepis	A small halecomorph neopterygian.	
Eosemionotus	E. ceresiensis	A small macrosemiid ginglymodian.	
Gracilignathichthys	G. microlepis	A medium-sized (15 cm (5.9 in) long) pholidopleuriform neopterygian	
Gyrolepis	G. sp.	A palaeoniscid actinopterygian primarily based on scales	
Habroichthys	H. griffithi	A medium-sized peltopleuriform neopterygian	
Luganoia	L. lepidosteoides	A very small (5 cm (2.0 in) long) luganoiiform neopterygian with deepened flank scales.	
Marcopoloichthys	M. mirigioliensis	A tiny suction-feeding teleosteomorph in the family Marcopoloichthyidae. The smallest known fossil teleosteomorph, at 3.2 cm (1.3 in) in length. Only found in the earliest few meters of the formation.	
Meridensia	M. meridensis	A small (10 cm (3.9 in) long) "perleidid" neopterygian with deepened flank scales and crushing-style dentition.	
Nannolepis	N. sp.	A small peltopleuriform neopterygian	
Ophiopsis	O. sp.	A small halecomorph neopterygian	
Peltoperleidus	P. ducanensis	A very small (4.1 cm (1.6 in) long) "perleidid" neopterygian with deepened flank scales and seizing-style dentition.	
Peltoperleidus	P. macrodontus	A small "perleidid" neopterygian.	
Peltoperleidus	P. obristi	A small "perleidid" neopterygian.	
Peltoperleidus	P. triseries	A small "perleidid" neopterygian.	
Peltopleurus	P. lissocephalus	A very small (5.5 cm (2.2 in) long) peltopleuriform neopterygian with deepened flank scales, robust grasping-style dentition, and an anal fin modified into a conical reproductive organ.	
Peltopleurus	P. nothocephalus	A small peltopleuriform neopterygian.	
Peltopleurus	P. rugosus	A small peltopleuriform neopterygian.	
Peripeltopleurus	P. vexillipinnis	A small (6.5 cm (2.6 in) long) peltopleuriform neopterygian with deepened flank scales.	
Pholidopleurus	P. ticinensis	A small (10 cm (3.9 in) long) to medium-sized pholidopleuriform neopterygian with deepened flank scales.	
Placopleurus	P. besanensis	A very small peltopleuriform neopterygian	
Placopleurus	P. gracilis	A very small peltopleuriform neopterygian	
Platysiagum	P. minus	A small (9 cm (3.5 in) long) platysiagid neopterygian	
Ptycholepis	P. barboi	A medium-sized ptycholepiform actinopterygian	
Ptycholepis	P. magnus	A medium-sized ptycholepiform actinopterygian	
Ptycholepis	P. priscus	A medium-sized ptycholepiform actinopterygian	
Ptycholepis	P. schaefferi	A medium-sized ptycholepiform actinopterygian	
Saurichthys	S. breviabdominalis	A medium-sized (>36 cm (14 in) long) saurichthyid chondrostean. It had a relatively stout build, reduced dentition, and laterally-oriented eyes relative to other Saurichthys species.	
Saurichthys	S. costasquamosus	A very large and particularly elongated saurichthyid chondrostean, up to 80 cm (2.6 ft) in length. It had a fairly thin snout, well-developed dentition, and dorsolaterally-oriented eyes, suggesting it was adapted for hunting in the upper layers of the water column.	
Saurichthys	S. paucitrichus	A medium-sized (25 cm (9.8 in) long) saurichthyid chondrostean, with a very thin snout and reduced dentition. It was intermediate in form (and presumably ecology) between S. breviabdominalis and S. costasquamosus.	
Saurichthys	S. rieppeli	A large (60 cm (2.0 ft) long) saurichthyid chondrostean. Compared to the other three species from the Besano Formation, it had strongly reduced scalation more similar to fully pelagic saurichthyids.	
Stoppania	S. ornata	A small and deep-bodied polzbergiid neopterygian. Previously considered a species of Dipteronotus.	
Ticinolepis	T. crassidens	A small (11 cm (4.3 in) long) basal ginglymodian with a durophagous diet, previously referred to Archaeosemionotus	
Ticinolepis	T. longaeva	A medium-sized (25 cm (9.8 in) long) basal ginglymodian, previously referred to Archaeosemionotus	

==== Chondrichthyes (cartilaginous fish) ====
Chondrichthyans of the Besano Formation
Genus	Species	Notes	Images
Acrodus	A. georgii	A large and fairly common hybodont shark with a durophagous diet. Known from a variety of fossil remains, including disarticulated cartilaginous skeletons, articulated dentition, and dorsal fin spines. Some fin spines could reach 31.1 cm (12.2 in) in height, indicating a total body length of 2–3 m (6.6–9.8 ft).	
Acronemus	A. tuberculatus	A small euselachian shark, around 30–35 cm (12–14 in) in total length. Its affinities are unclear: its fin spines are structurally similar to ctenacanths, the teeth are closer to durophagous hybodonts, and the braincase shows similarities to both hybodonts and neoselachians (modern-style sharks). Fossils of this species were previously classified as Nemacanthus tuberculatus (fin spines) and Acrodus bicarinatus (teeth).	
Asteracanthus (Strophodus)	A. reticulatus	A large durophagous hybodont shark, variably placed within the genus Asteracanthus or Strophodus. In either case, the Besano Formation has produced the oldest remains of this long-lasting form, with both flat, hypermineralized teeth and ridged scales recovered from the formation.	
Hybodus	H. cf. plicatilis	A large hybodont shark, known from rare teeth indicative of a predatory diet.	
Palaeobates	P. angustissimus	A medium-sized durophagous hybodont shark. One partial skeleton (specimen PIMUZ T 3838) has a fin spine 13.8 cm (5.4 in) in height.	

=== Cephalopods ===
The cephalopod fauna of the Besano Formation was described in detail by Hans Rieber in the 1960s and 1970s. Most fossils are concentrated at Point 902, occupying several distinct biostratigraphic zones recorded through the outcrop, bed-by-bed.

Cephalopods of the Besano Formation
Genus	Species	Notes	Images
Celtites	C. sp.	A danubitid ceratite ammonoid	
Breviconoteuthis	B. breviconus	A phragmoteuthid coleoid	
Chieseiceras	C. chiesense	A ceratitid ceratite ammonoid	
Enoploceras	E. riebari	A tainoceratid nautiloid	
Epigymnites	E. ecki	A gymnitid ceratite ammonoid	
Flexoptychites	F. acutus	A ptychitid ceratite ammonoid	
Germanonautilus	G. aff. ellipticus	A tainoceratid nautiloid	
Gymnites	G. cf. bosnensis	A gymnitid ceratite ammonoid	
Lecanites	L. misanii	A lecanitid ceratite ammonoid	
Longobardites	L. zsigmondyi	A longobarditid ceratite ammonoid	
Mojsisovicsteuthis	M. boeckhi	An enigmatic coleoid	
Mojsisovicsteuthis	M.? meneghini	An enigmatic coleoid	
Mojsisovicsteuthis	M.? cf. subrotundus	An enigmatic coleoid	
Monophyllites	M. sp.	A ussuritid ceratite ammonoid	
Nevadites	N. ambrosionii	A ceratitid ceratite ammonoid	
Norites	N. gondola	A noritid ceratite ammonoid	
Parakellnerites	P. carinatus	A ceratitid ceratite ammonoid	
Parakellnerites	P. frauenfelderi	A ceratitid ceratite ammonoid	
Parakellnerites	P. merianii	A ceratitid ceratite ammonoid	
Phragmoteuthis	P.? ticinensis	A phragmoteuthid coleoid based on soft-tissue remains lacking shell material.	
Proarcestes	P. extralabiatus	An arcestid ceratite ammonoid	
Repossia	R. acutenodosa	A ceratitid ceratite ammonoid	
Serpianites	S. airaghii	A ceratitid ceratite ammonoid	
Serpianites	S. curionii	A ceratitid ceratite ammonoid	
Serpianites	S. serpianensis	A ceratitid ceratite ammonoid	
Serpianites	S. zinae	A ceratitid ceratite ammonoid	
Syringonautilus	S. sp.	A syringonautilid nautiloid	
Stoppaniceras	S. artinii	A ceratitid ceratite ammonoid	
Stoppaniceras	S. grandinodosus	A ceratitid ceratite ammonoid	
Stoppaniceras	S. variabile	A ceratitid ceratite ammonoid	
Ticinites	T. polymorphus	A ceratitid ceratite ammonoid	
Ticinites	T. ticinensis	A ceratitid ceratite ammonoid	
Ticinoteuthis	T. chuchichaeschtli	A straight-shelled coleoid similar to Mojsisovicsteuthis	
Trematoceras	T. elegans	A pseudorthocerid nautiloid. Some specimens were previously described as "Michelinoceras" campanile.	

=== Other molluscs ===
Some of the most abundant fossils in the Besano Formation belong to the bivalve Daonella, with multiple species evolving in a sequence through the formation (according to the stratigraphic implications of Point 902).

Non-cephalopod molluscs of the Besano Formation
Genus	Species	Notes	Images
Bakevellia		A rare bivalve	
Daonella	D. airaghii	An abundant halobiid bivalve	
Daonella	D. angulata	An abundant halobiid bivalve	
Daonella	D. caudata	An abundant halobiid bivalve	
Daonella	D. elongata	An abundant halobiid bivalve	
Daonella	D. fascicostata	An abundant halobiid bivalve	
Daonella	D. golana	An abundant halobiid bivalve	
Daonella	D. luganensis	An abundant halobiid bivalve	
Daonella	D. obtusa	An abundant halobiid bivalve	
Daonella	D. pseudomoussoni	An abundant halobiid bivalve	
Daonella	D. serpianensis	An abundant halobiid bivalve	
Daonella	D. ticinensis	An abundant halobiid bivalve	
Daonella	D. vaceki	An abundant halobiid bivalve	
Frederikella	F. cf. cancellata	A liotiid gastropod	
Gervillia		A rare bivalve	
Omphaloptycha	O. spp.	A coelostylinid gastropod	
Peribositria		A rare posidoniid bivalve	
Worthenia	W.? aff. microstriata	A lophospirid gastropod	
Trachynerita	T. sp.	A neritariid neritoid gastropod	

=== Other invertebrates ===
- Conodonts (Neogondolella)
- Brachiopods (Coenothyris, extremely rare)
- One echinoid (sea urchin) spine
- Crustaceans (Antrimpos, Atropicaris)
- Arachnids (Protobuthus ziliolii)

=== Plants ===
- Calcareous algae (Diplopora)
- Leaves and branches of voltzialean conifers (Voltzia)
