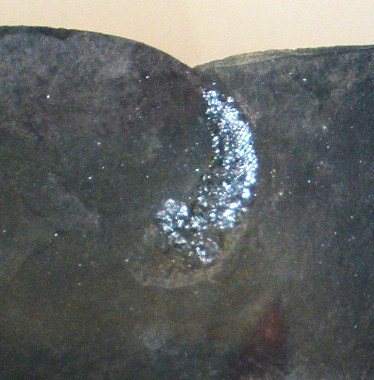
- Fossil of Besania sp. at Civic Museum of Fossils of Besano

Scientific classification
- Kingdom: Animalia
- Phylum: Chordata
- Class: Actinopterygii
- Subclass: Neopterygii
- Genus: †Besania; Brough, 1939

Type species
- †Besania micrognathus Brough, 1939

Other species
- †B. schaufelbergerae Herzog & Bürgin, 2005

= Besania =

Besania Temporal range: Anisian–Ladinian

Extinct genus of fishes

Besania is an extinct genus of prehistoric marine ray-finned fish that lived during the Anisian and Ladinian ages of the Middle Triassic epoch in what is now southern/southeastern Switzerland and northern Italy. Fossils were recovered from the Besano Formation of Monte San Giorgio area (Swiss-Italian borderland) and the Prosanto Formation of canton Graubünden, Switzerland.

Initially considered a perleidiform or luganoiiform, it is now thought to be an indeterminate "halecostome" or basal neopterygian. There are two known species, Besania micrognathus (type species) and B. schaufelbergerae. Both are quite small (31 mm (1.2 in)–44 mm (1.7 in) in standard length).

The genus is named after the Italian town of Besano, Lombardy, near Monte San Giorgio.

== See also ==
- Prehistoric fish
- List of prehistoric bony fish
