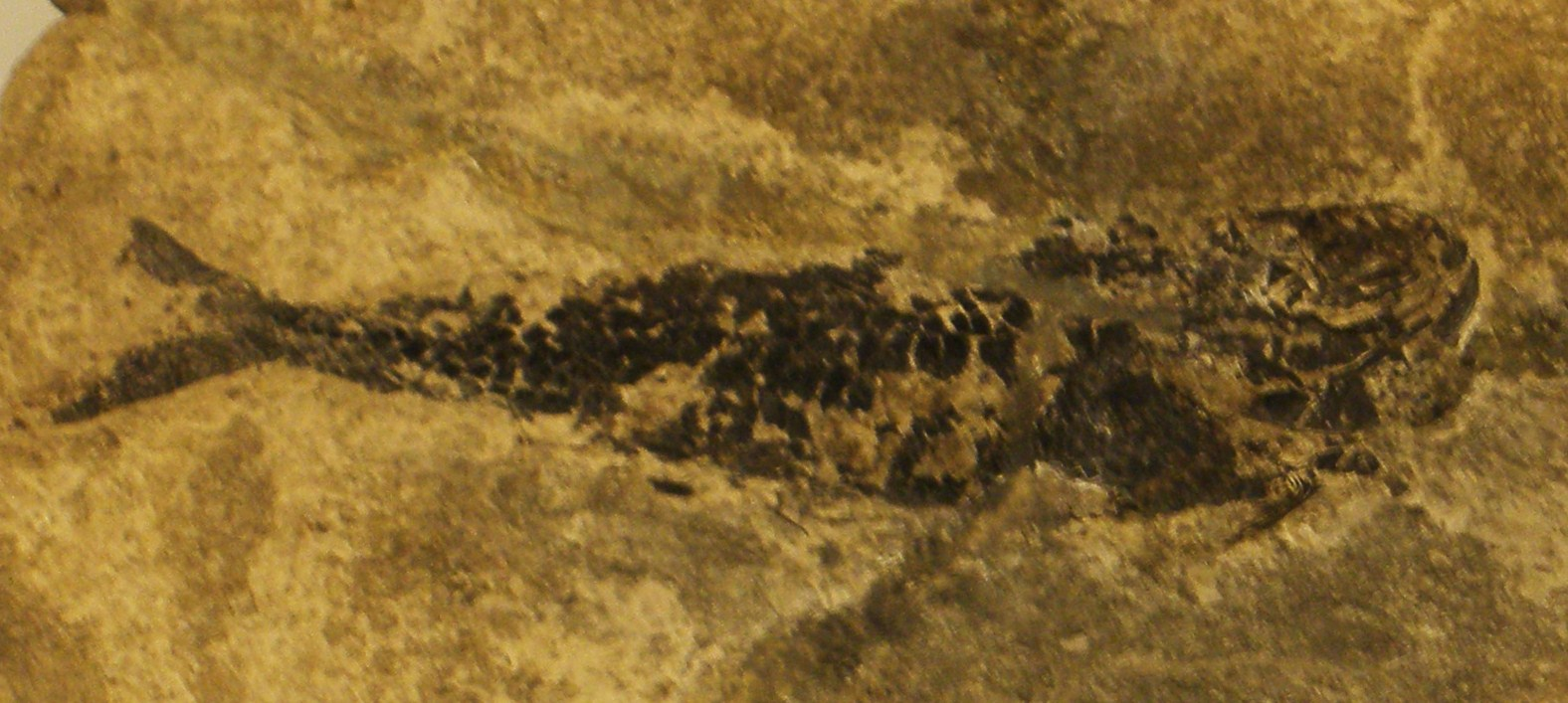
- Meridensia meridensis fossil

Scientific classification
- Kingdom: Animalia
- Phylum: Chordata
- Class: Actinopterygii
- Order: †Perleidiformes
- Genus: †Meridensia; Andersson, 1916

Type species
- †Meridensia meridensis (de Alessantri, 1910)

= Meridensia =

Meridensia Temporal range: Anisian–Ladinian

Extinct genus of fishes

Meridensia is an extinct genus of prehistoric ray-finned fish that lived during the Anisian and Ladinian ages of the Middle Triassic epoch in what is now southern Switzerland and northern Italy. Fossils were recovered from the Besano Formation of Monte San Giorgio and Besano area at the Swiss-Italian boundary.

The type species is Meridensia meridensis (= Meridensia gibba). Its name refers to the Swiss town of Meride on Monte San Giorgio.

== See also ==
- Prehistoric fish
- List of prehistoric bony fish
