= Luganoia =

Luganoia Temporal range: Anisian–Ladinian

Scientific classification
- Kingdom: Animalia
- Phylum: Chordata
- Class: Actinopterygii
- Order: †Luganoiiformes
- Family: †Luganoiidae
- Genus: †Luganoia; Brough, 1939

Type species
- †Luganoia lepidosteoides Brough, 1939

Species
- †L. fortuna Xu, 2020

Extinct genus of fishes

Luganoia is an extinct genus of prehistoric bony fish that lived during the Anisian and Ladinian ages of the Middle Triassic epoch. Fossils were recovered from the Besano Formation of Monte San Giorgio and Besano area (Swiss-Italian boundary) and from the Zhuganpo Member (Falang Formation) of Guizhou, South China. It was also reported from the Ladinian of Spain.

The genus is named after Lake Lugano next to Monte San Giorgio.

== See also ==
- Prehistoric fish
- List of prehistoric bony fish
