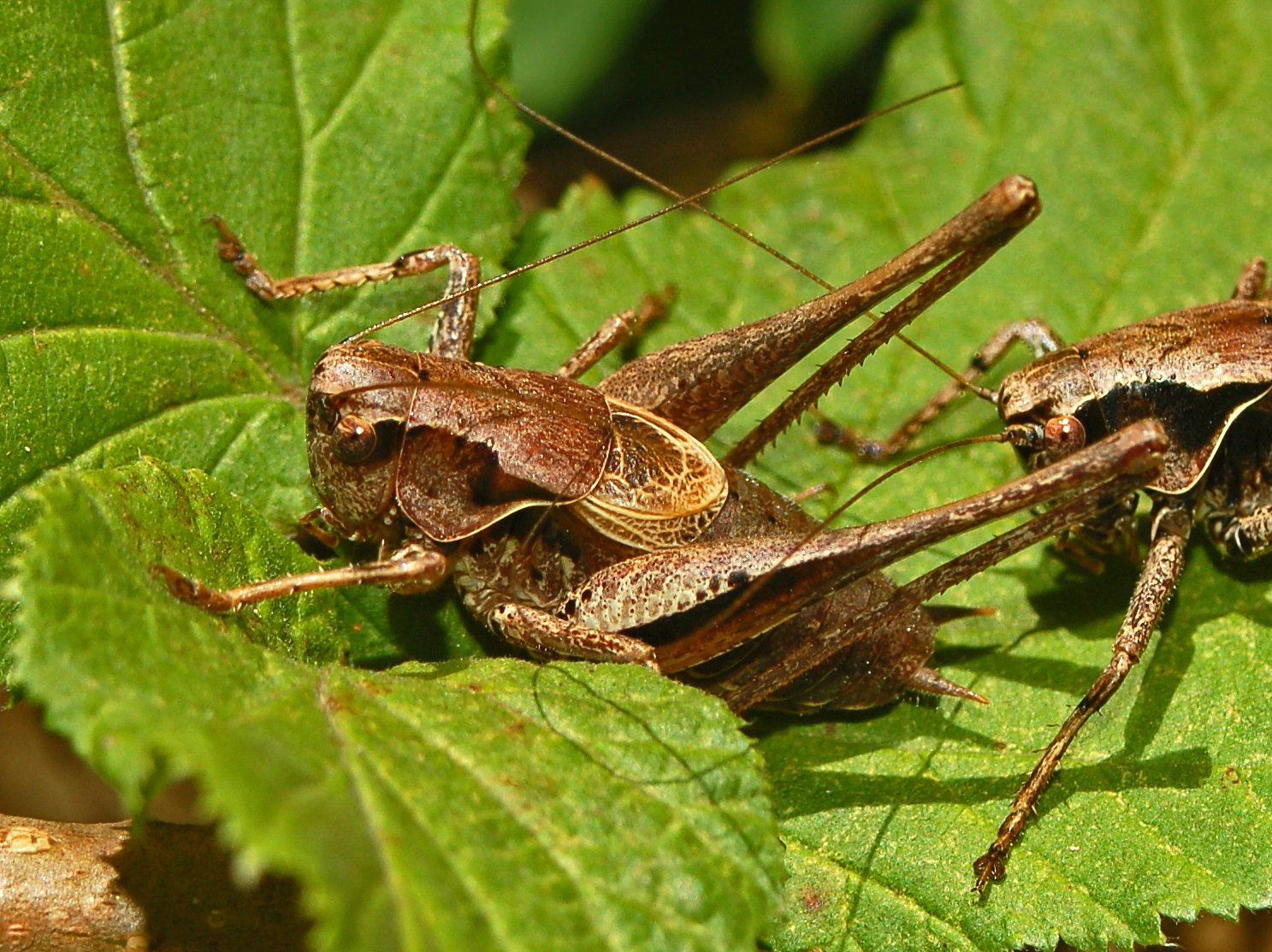
- Male of Pholidoptera griseoaptera
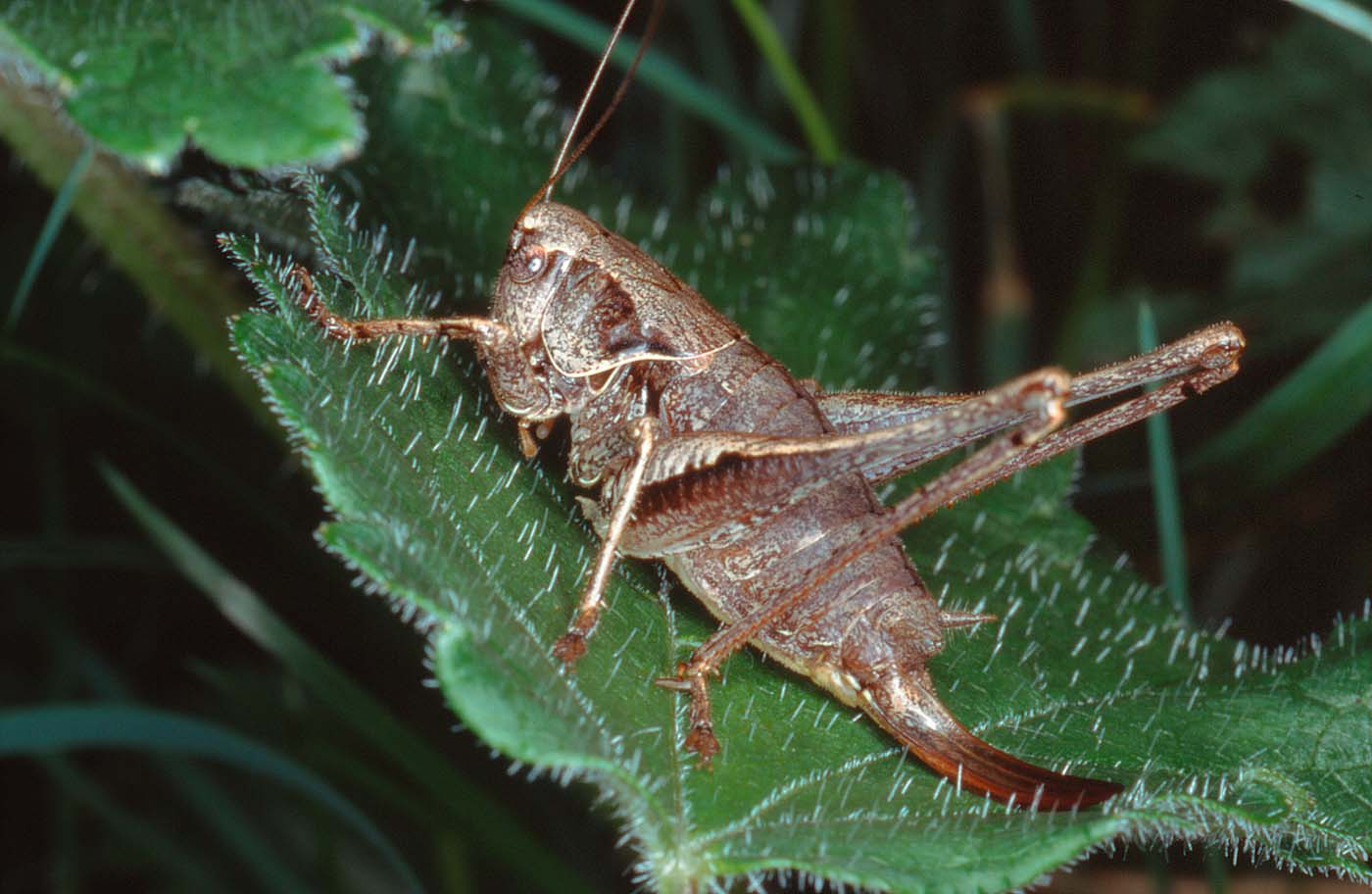
- Female of Pholidoptera griseoaptera

Scientific classification
- Kingdom: Animalia
- Phylum: Arthropoda
- Clade: Pancrustacea
- Class: Insecta
- Order: Orthoptera
- Suborder: Ensifera
- Family: Tettigoniidae
- Genus: Pholidoptera
- Species: P. griseoaptera

Binomial name
- Pholidoptera griseoaptera (De Geer, 1773)

Synonyms
- Decticus apterus (Charpentier, 1825); Gryllus cinereus Gmelin, 1789; Locusta aptera Charpentier, 1825; Locusta griseoaptera De Geer, 1773; Pholidoptera cinerea (Gmelin, 1789); Pterolepis aptera (Charpentier, 1825)

= Pholidoptera griseoaptera =

Dark bush-cricket

Species of cricket-like insect

Close-up of Pholidoptera griseoaptera

Pholidoptera griseoaptera, the dark bush-cricket, is a flightless species of European bush-cricket; it is the type species of its genus with no subspecies.

== Description ==
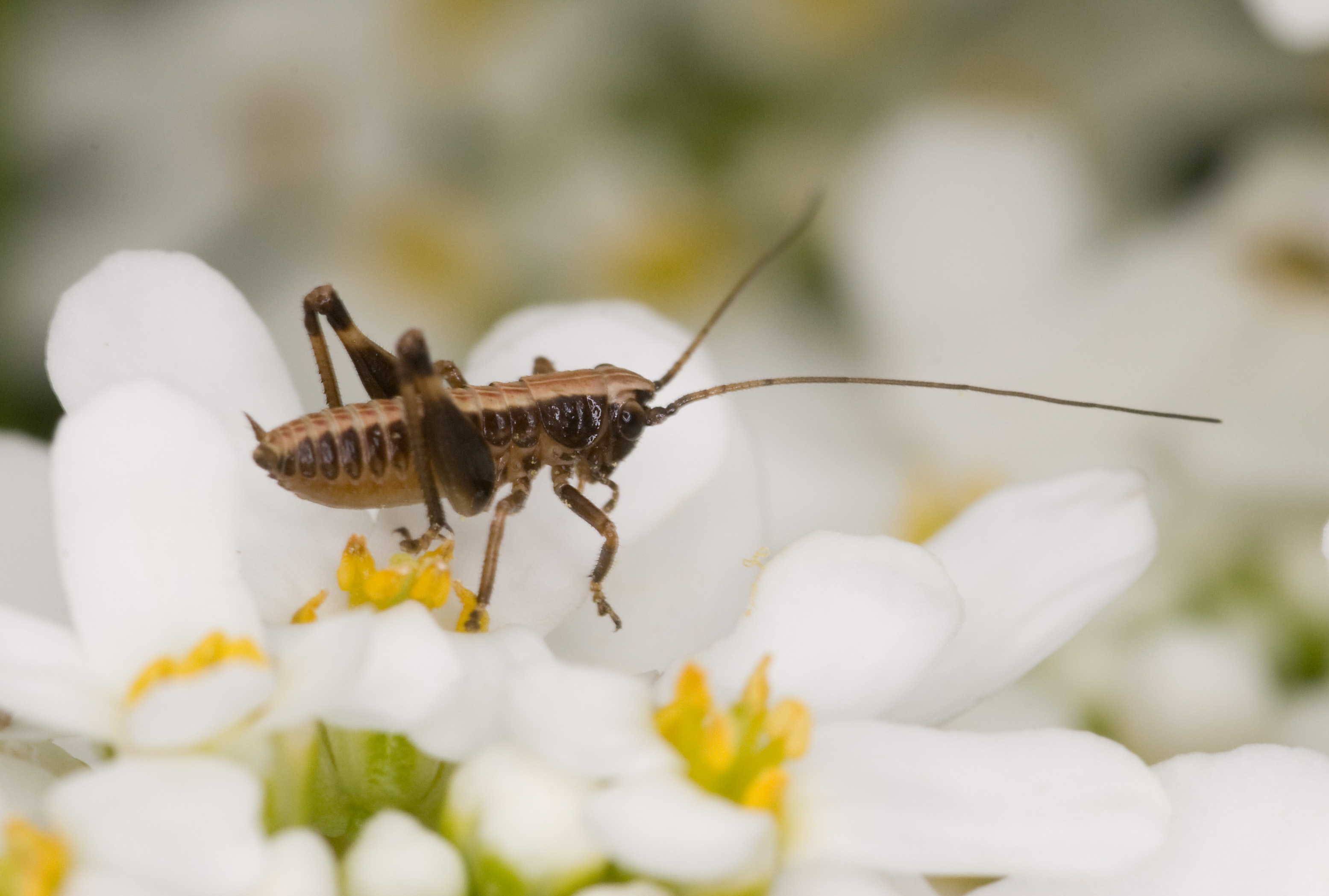
Nymph

Sound of Pholidoptera griseoaptera
Field recording in the Netherlands 33s

Pholidoptera griseoaptera can reach a body length of 11 to 21 mm (males) and 15 to 20 mm (females), much smaller than the similar Pholidoptera aptera. The sickle-shaped and upward curved ovipositor of the females is 8 to 10 mm long, while the males have two short cerci. The antennae and the hind legs are quite long.

The rounded brachypterous wings of the males are brown with light brown to ochre-coloured edges and are about 5 mm in length (about as long as the pronotum). The females are almost wingless or have half-round, grey-brown fore-wings that are 1–2 mm long. Long-winged (macropterous) forms are not recorded.

== Distribution and biology ==
This species can be found in Europe from northern Spain up to Crimea, Caucasus and the Near East. It is fairly common in Great Britain, but not recorded from Ireland. On the Isle of Man the species is legally protected under Schedule 5 of the Wildlife Act 1990, being found at only two coastal sites (Lonan and Glen Maye) at the extreme north of the species’ British Isles distribution. Adults are omnivorous, feeding primarily on small insects such as aphids and caterpillars, but eat also plants such as bramble (Rubus species), dandelion (Taraxacum species) and nettles (Urtica species). The stridulation is a brief and penetrating sound, repeatedly irregularly night and day.

== Habitat ==
The dark bush-cricket colonizes a variety of habitats, but avoids sandy soils and are accordingly rare in sandy areas. It is mainly present in forest edges or clearings, but can be found also in wasteland, parks and gardens, at an elevation of about 0–2,100 metres (0–6,890 ft) above sea level.

The females lay their eggs in the soil, in dead branches, in bark crevices and rotting wood. The eggs need high humidity. The larvae require two years for their full development, with seven larval stages. They feed exclusively on vegetables. Nymphs appear at the end of April of the third year, while the first adults appear in June.
