= Arctosomus =

Arctosomus Temporal range: Early Triassic

Scientific classification
- Kingdom: Animalia
- Phylum: Chordata
- Class: Actinopterygii
- Order: †Pholidopleuriformes
- Family: †Pholidopleuridae
- Genus: †Arctosomus; Berg, 1941
- Species: †A. sibiricus

Binomial name
- †Arctosomus sibiricus Berg, 1941

Extinct genus of fishes

Arctosomus is an extinct genus of prehistoric freshwater bony fish that lived during the Early Triassic epoch of Krasnoyarsk Krai, Russia. It contains a single species, A. sibiricus.

== See also ==
- Prehistoric fish
- List of prehistoric bony fish
