= Luitemaa Nature Reserve =

Protected area in Estonia

Luitema Nature Reserve
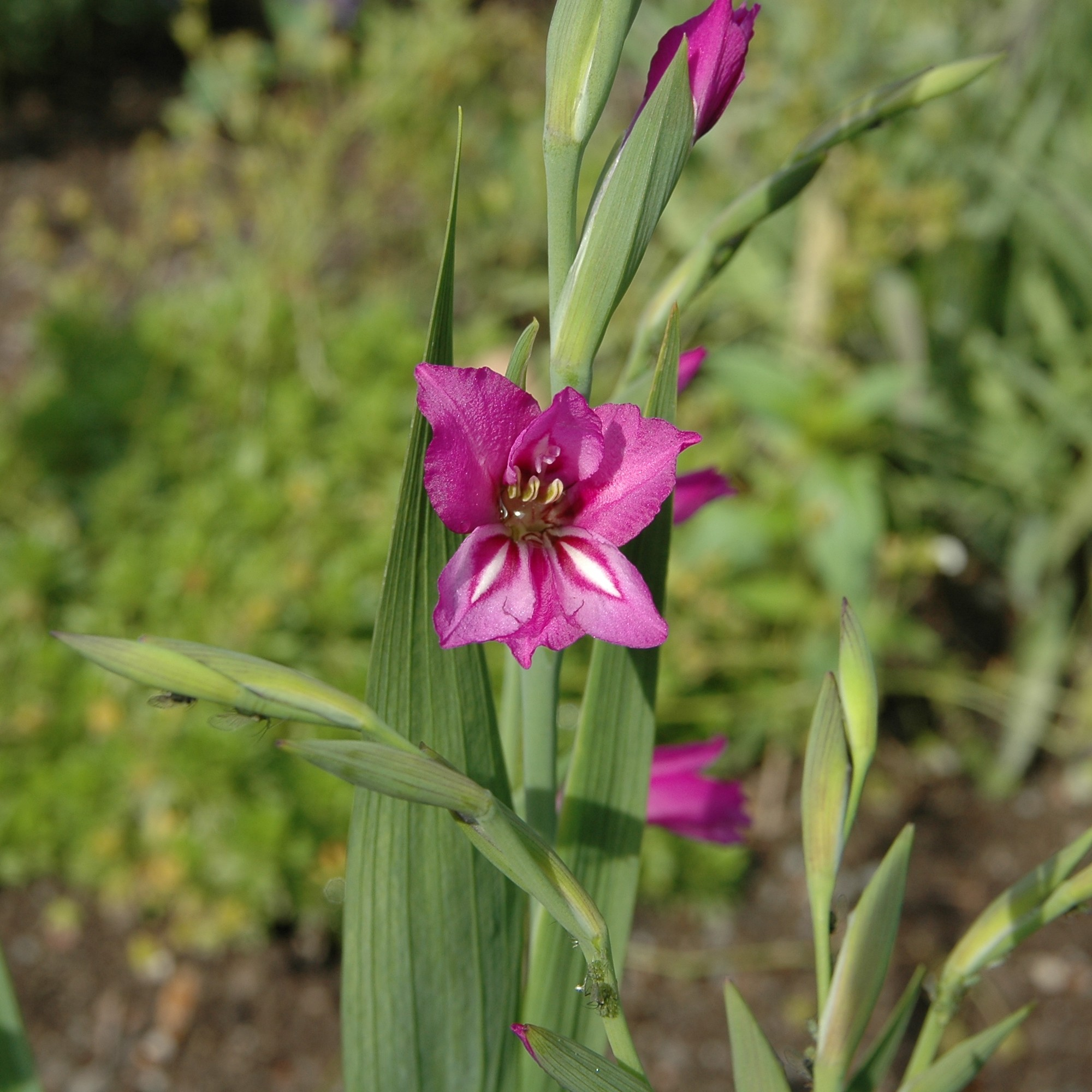
- Gladiolus imbricatus can be found in Luitemaa.

- Location within Estonia
- Location: Estonia
- Nearest city: Pärnu
- Coordinates: 58°10′27″N 24°30′33″E

Ramsar Wetland
- Official name: Luitemaa
- Designated: 27 January 2010
- Reference no.: 1962

Luitemaa Nature Reserve is a nature reserve situated in south-western Estonia, in Pärnu County.

== Geography ==
Luitemaa Nature Reserve is situated by the coast and displays a variety of nature types, like coastal meadows rich in bird-life, post-glacial sand dunes covered in pine forest, and large bogs. Among the plants and animals found in the reserve, Gladiolus imbricatus and the Natterjack Toad can be mentioned. There are facilities for visitors such as a bird tower and nature trail in the reserve.

== Gallery ==
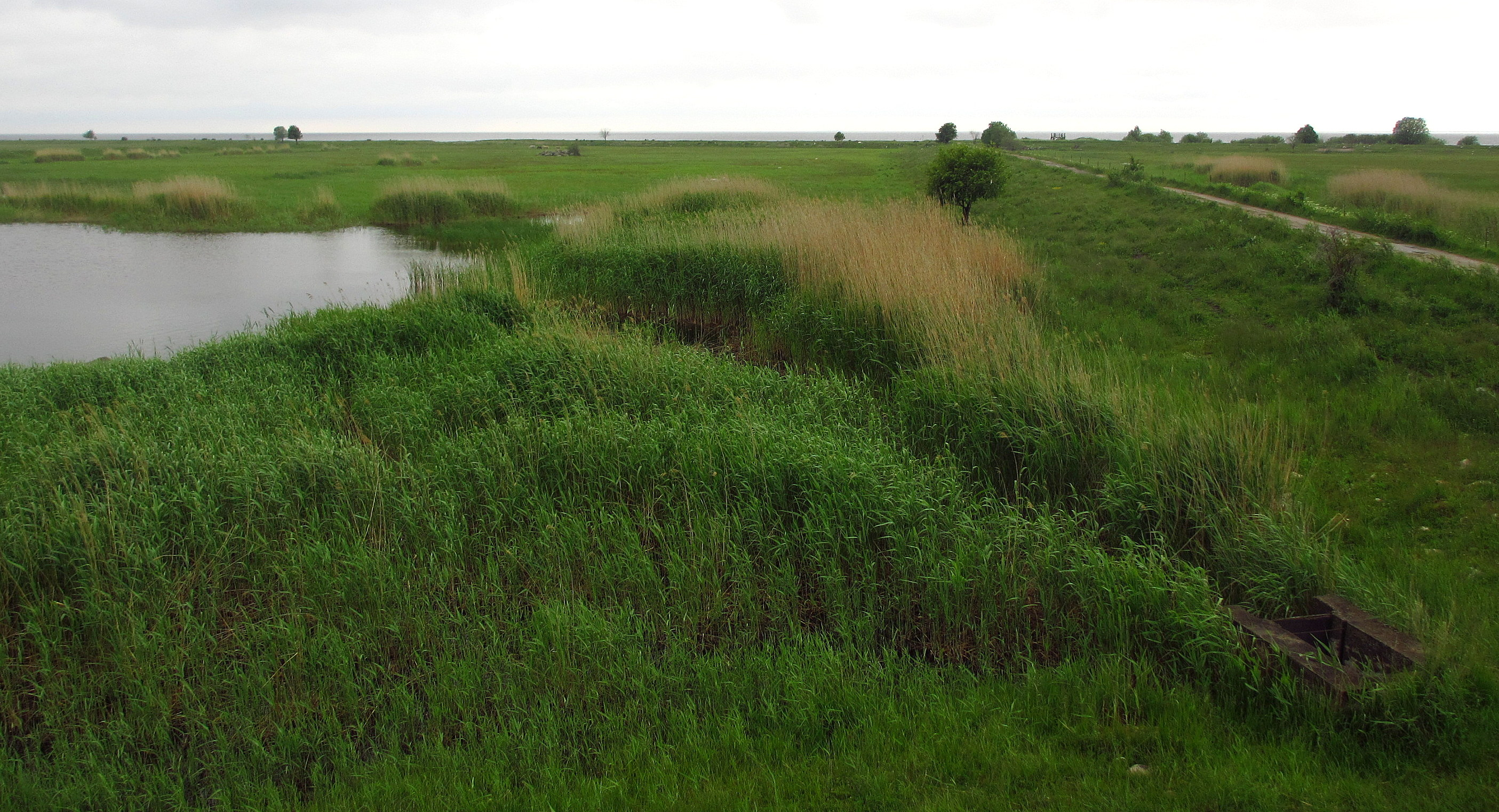
Pikla coastal meadow

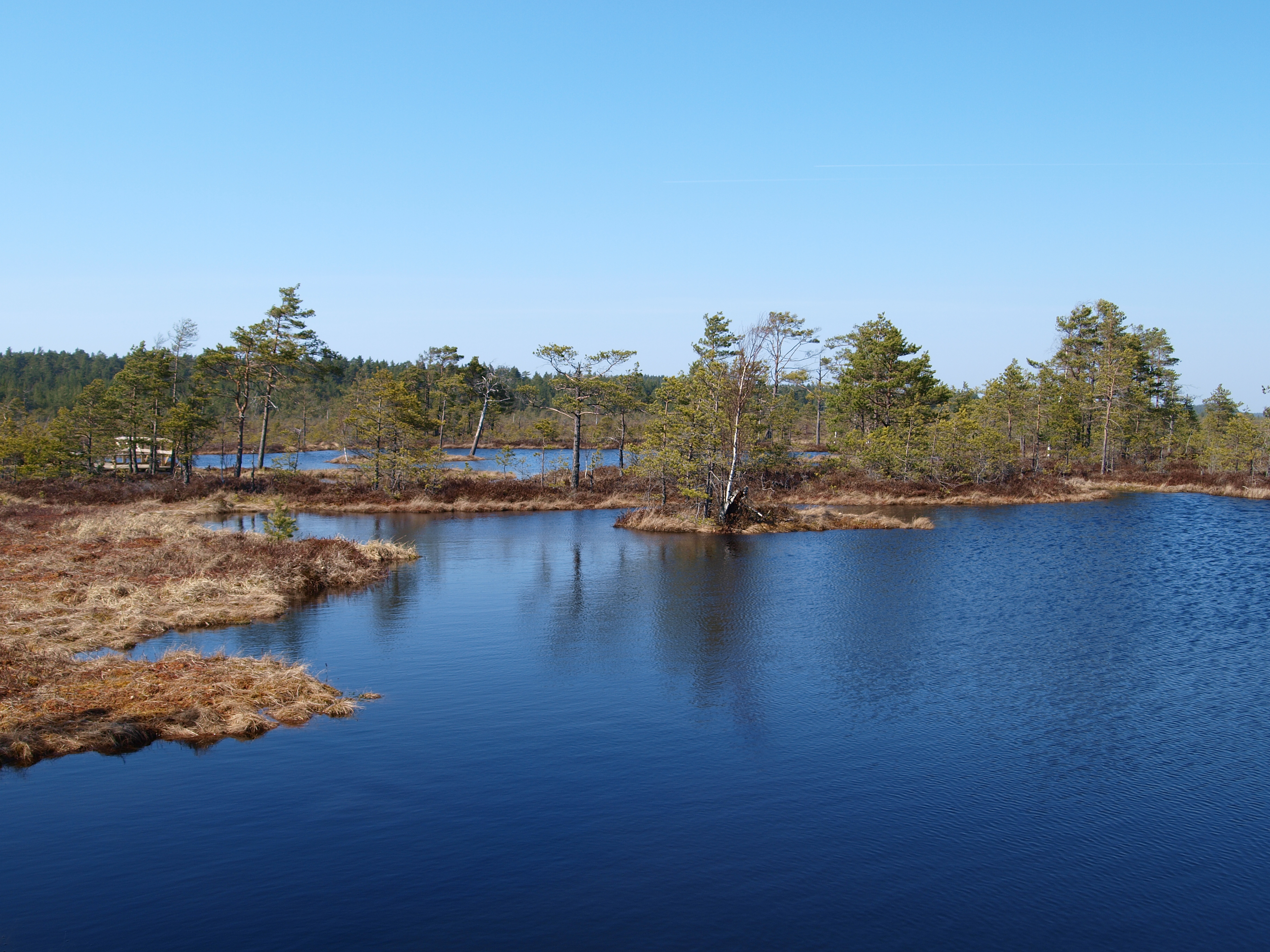
Tolkuse bog

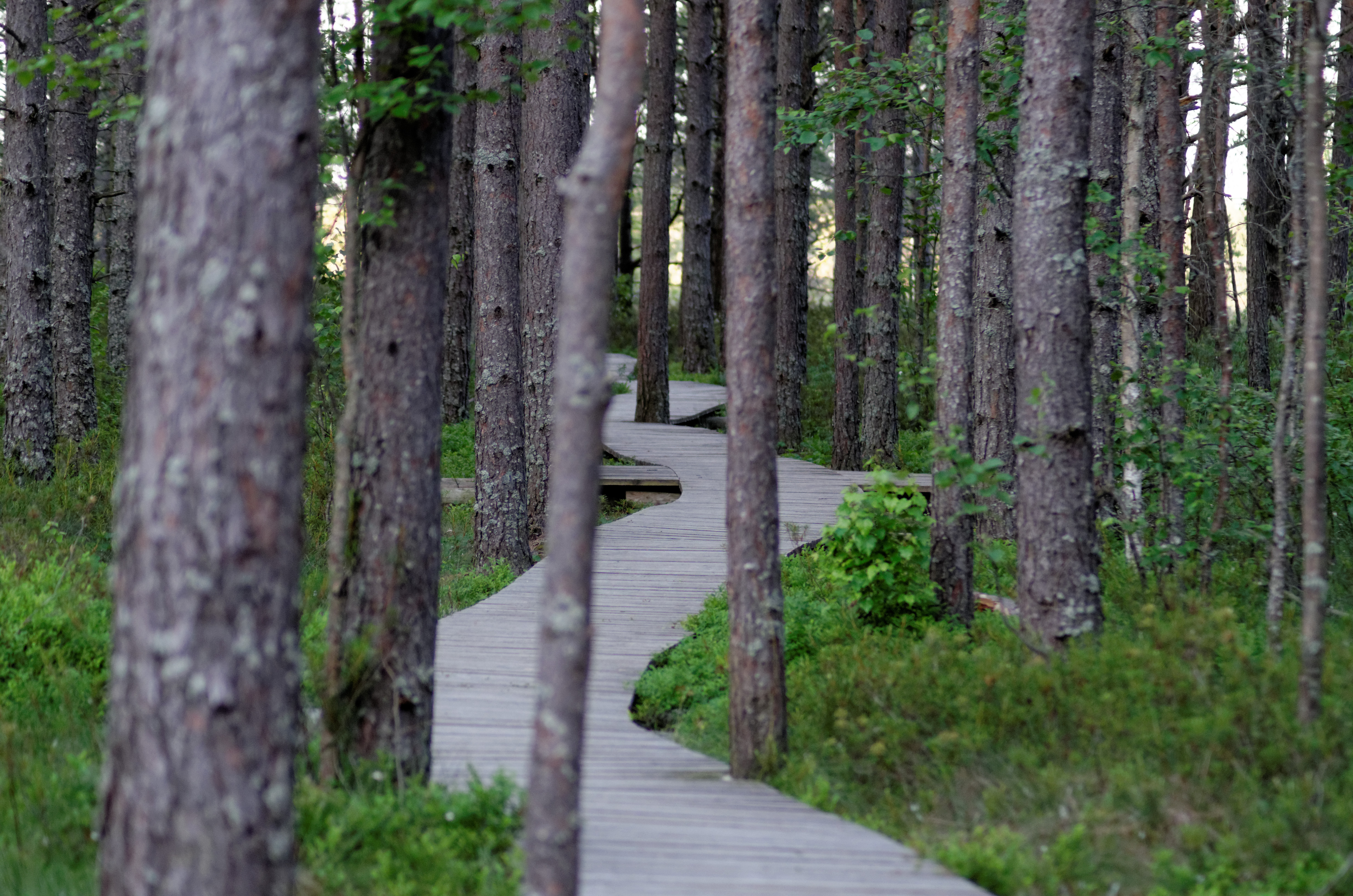
Raised boardwalk through Tolkuse bog

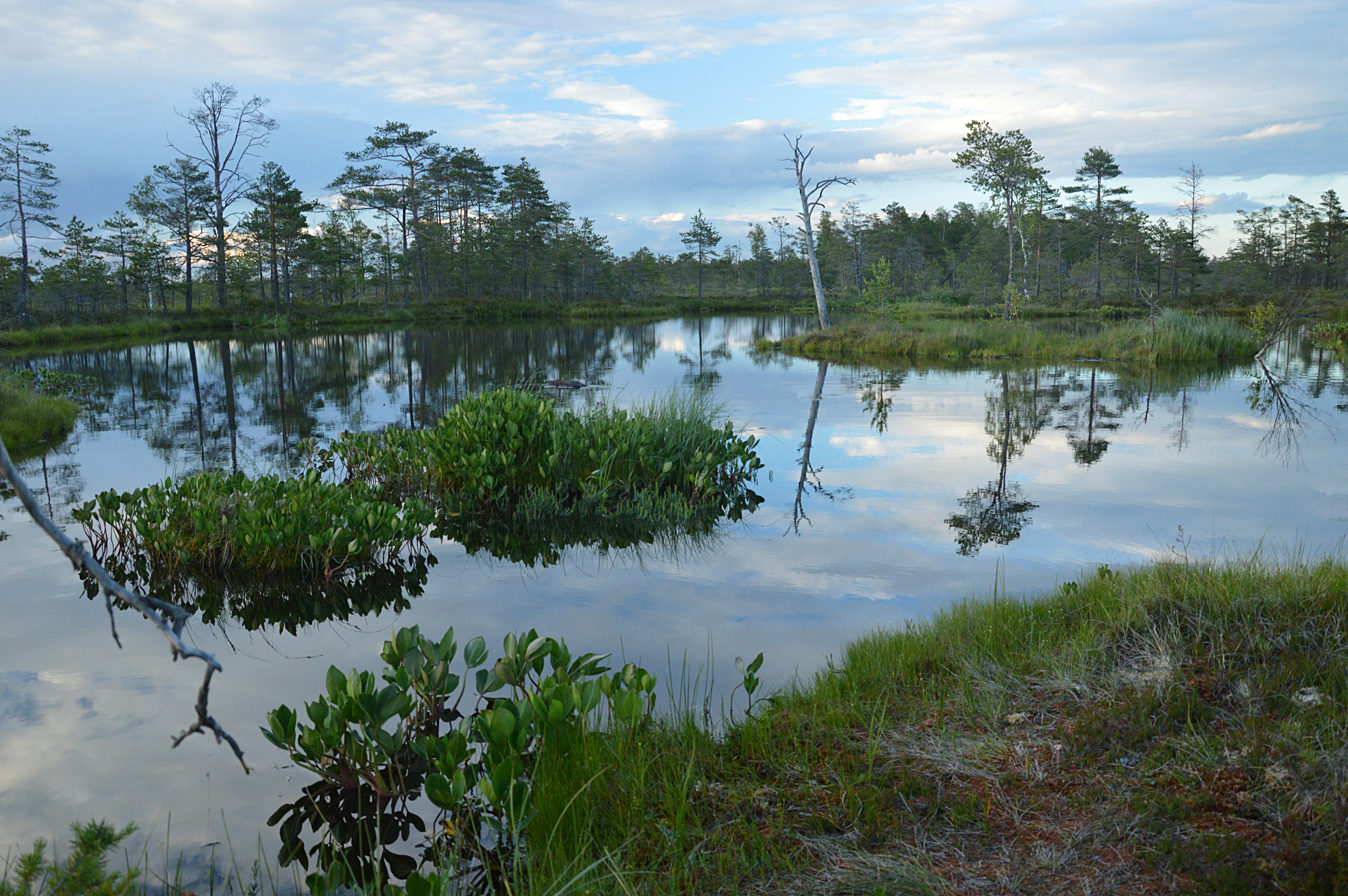
Tolkuse bog pools
