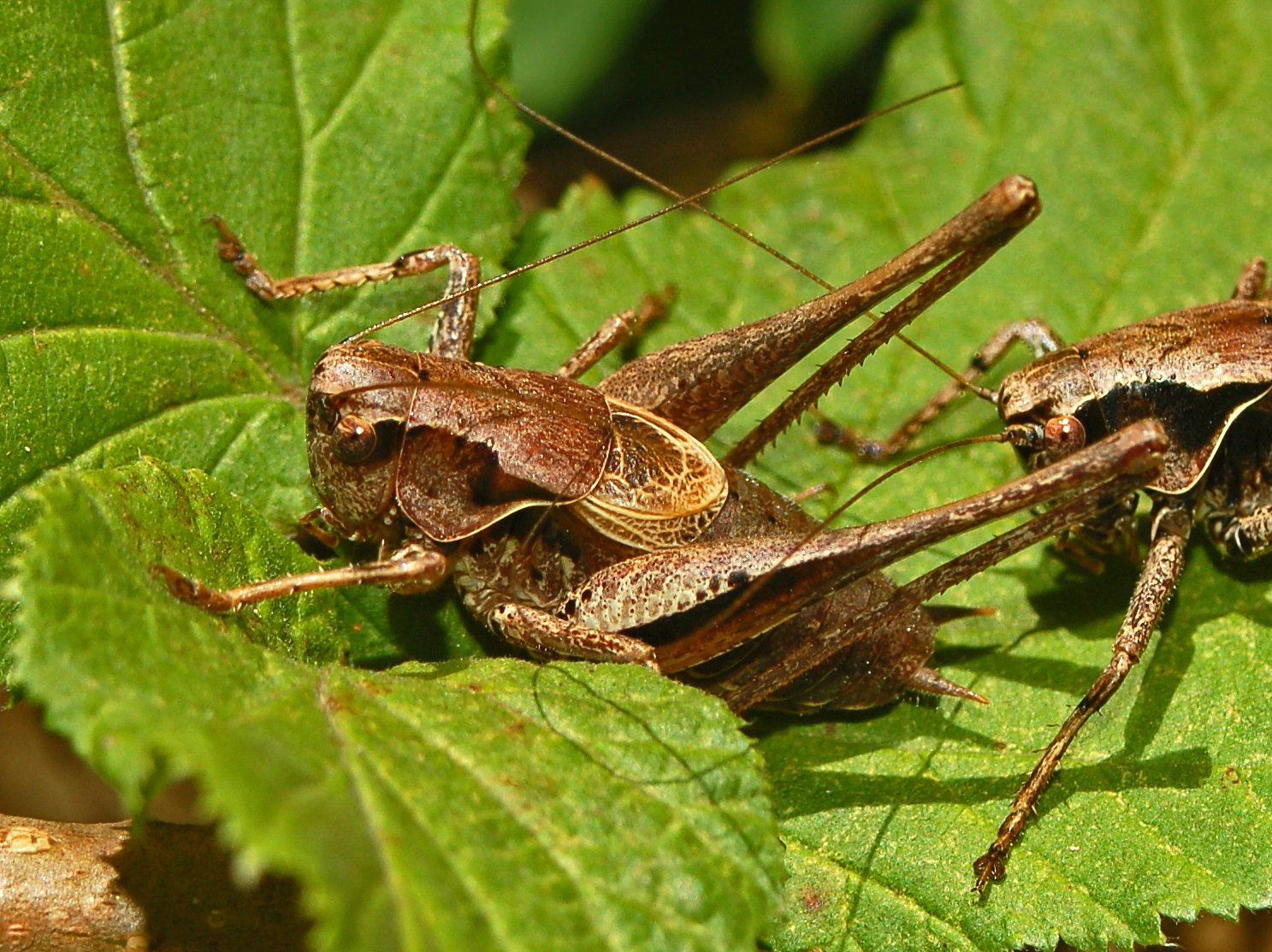
- Male Pholidoptera griseoaptera

Scientific classification
- Domain: Eukaryota
- Kingdom: Animalia
- Phylum: Arthropoda
- Class: Insecta
- Order: Orthoptera
- Suborder: Ensifera
- Family: Tettigoniidae
- Subfamily: Tettigoniinae
- Tribe: Pholidopterini
- Genus: Pholidoptera; Wesmael, 1838

Synonyms
- Micropteryx Stephens, 1835; Olynthoscelis Fischer von Waldheim, 1839; Thamnotrizon Fischer, 1853

= Pholidoptera =

Genus of cricket-like animals

Pholidoptera is a genus of bush-crickets belonging to the subfamily Tettigoniinae and the type genus of the tribe Pholidopterini.

== List of species ==
- Pholidoptera aptera (Fabricius, 1793) - alpine dark bush-cricket
- Pholidoptera brevicollis (A. Costa, 1882)
- Pholidoptera brevipes Ramme, 1939
- Pholidoptera brunneri (Targioni-Tozzetti, 1881)
- Pholidoptera bureschi Maran, 1957
- Pholidoptera caucasica (Fischer von Waldheim, 1846)
- Pholidoptera dalmatica (H. A. Krauss, 1879) - Dalmatian dark bush-cricket
- Pholidoptera dalmatina Maran, 1953
- Pholidoptera distincta (Uvarov, 1921)
- Pholidoptera ebneri Ramme, 1931 - Ebner's dark bush-cricket
- Pholidoptera fallax (Fischer von Waldheim, 1854)
- Pholidoptera femorata (Fieber, 1853) - large dark bush-cricket
- Pholidoptera frivaldskyi (Herman, 1871) - green dark bush-cricket
- Pholidoptera ganevi Harz, 1986
- Pholidoptera griseoaptera (De Geer, 1773) – dark bush-cricket
  - type species: (as Locusta griseoaptera De Geer)
- Pholidoptera guichardi Karabag, 1961
- Pholidoptera ledereri (Fieber, 1861)
- Pholidoptera littoralis (Fieber, 1853) - littoral dark bush-cricket
- Pholidoptera lucasi F. Willemse, 1976
- Pholidoptera macedonica Ramme, 1928 - Macedonian dark bush-cricket
- Pholidoptera ornata (Nedelkov, 1907)
- Pholidoptera persica Chopard, 1921
- Pholidoptera pontica (Retowski, 1888)
- Pholidoptera pustulipes (Fischer von Waldheim, 1846)
- Pholidoptera satunini (Uvarov, 1916)
- Pholidoptera stankoi Karaman, 1960 - Stanko's dark bush-cricket
- Pholidoptera tartarus (Saussure, 1874)
- Pholidoptera transsylvanica (Fischer von Waldheim, 1853) - Transylvanian dark bush-cricket
