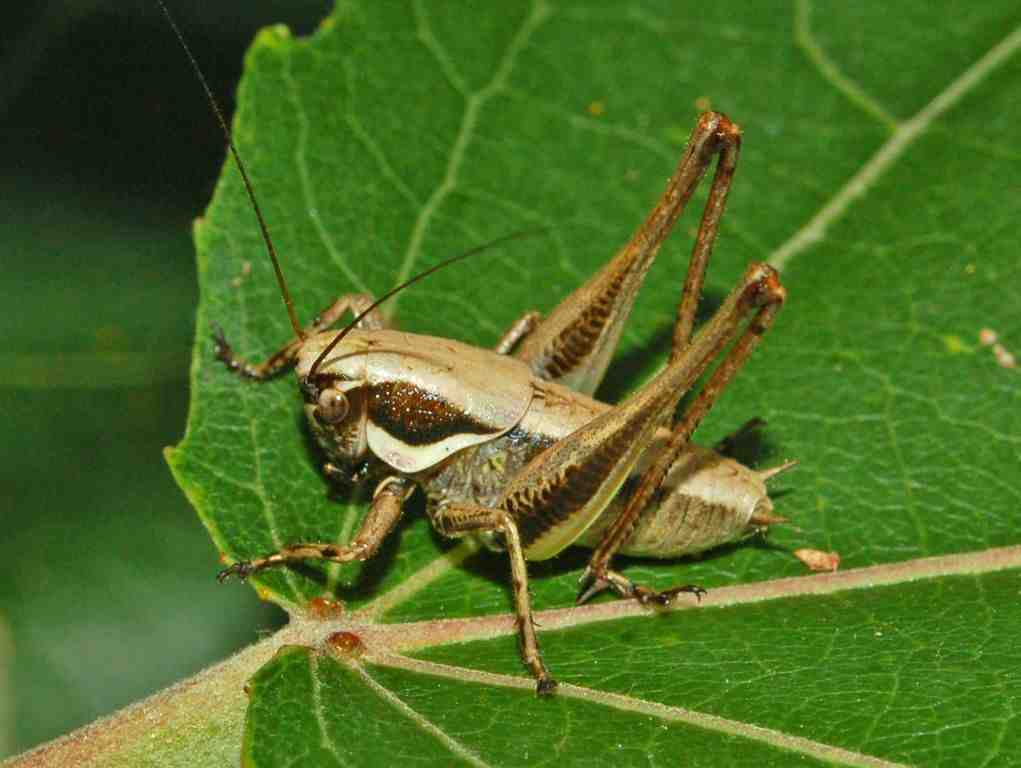
- Pholidoptera fallax, young male

Scientific classification
- Kingdom: Animalia
- Phylum: Arthropoda
- Class: Insecta
- Order: Orthoptera
- Suborder: Ensifera
- Family: Tettigoniidae
- Genus: Pholidoptera
- Species: P. fallax

Binomial name
- Pholidoptera fallax (Fischer, 1853)

Synonyms
- Thamnotrizon austriacus Türk, 1860; Thamnotrizon fallax Fischer, 1853

= Pholidoptera fallax =

Species of cricket-like animal

Pholidoptera fallax is a species of 'katydids crickets' belonging to the family Tettigoniidae subfamily Tettigoniinae.

This cricket is mainly present in Austria, France, Italy, Romania, Greece, Slovenia and Switzerland.

The adult males grow up to 15–18 millimetres (0.59–0.71 in) long, while females reach 17–23 millimetres (0.67–0.91 in). They can be encountered from July through October in clearings, dry forest edges, etc.

The basic coloration of the body varies from dark brownish to pale brown, but sometimes the body is light purple or reddish. The extended pronotum partially covers the short wings and shows a black band, with whitish lateral margins.

The abdomen is thick and yellowish, the legs are pale brown and relatively long, with a pattern of dark brown spots on the hind legs. The female has a slightly curved ovipositor, which measures about 10–13 millimetres (0.39–0.51 in).

Close-Up of a Pholidoptera fallax
