= Gracilignathichthys =

Gracilignathichthys Temporal range: Late Anisian to Early Ladinian

Scientific classification
- Kingdom: Animalia
- Phylum: Chordata
- Class: Actinopterygii
- Order: †Pholidopleuriformes
- Genus: †Gracilignathichthys; Burgin, 1992
- Species: †G. microlepis

Binomial name
- †Gracilignathichthys microlepis Burgin, 1992

Extinct genus of fishes

Gracilignathichthys is an extinct genus of prehistoric marine ray-finned fish that lived during the late Anisian to the early Ladinian stage of the Middle Triassic epoch in what is now Europe. It contains a single species, G. microlepis, known from the Besano Formation on the border of Italy and Switzerland. Teeth reminiscent of Gracilignathichthys are also known from the Muschelkalk of Luxembourg. It is considered a pholidopleuriform of uncertain affinities.

== See also ==
- Prehistoric fish
- List of prehistoric bony fish
