= Civic Museum of Fossils of Besano =

Museum in Besano, Italy

Coordinates: 45.88975°N 8.88976°E

The Civic Museum of Fossils of Besano, located in Besano, Italy, specializes in palaeontology and houses a collection of fossils that were found nearby. In 2010, the area around the museum was named a UNESCO World Heritage Site. The museum is famous for its Besanosaurus fossils.

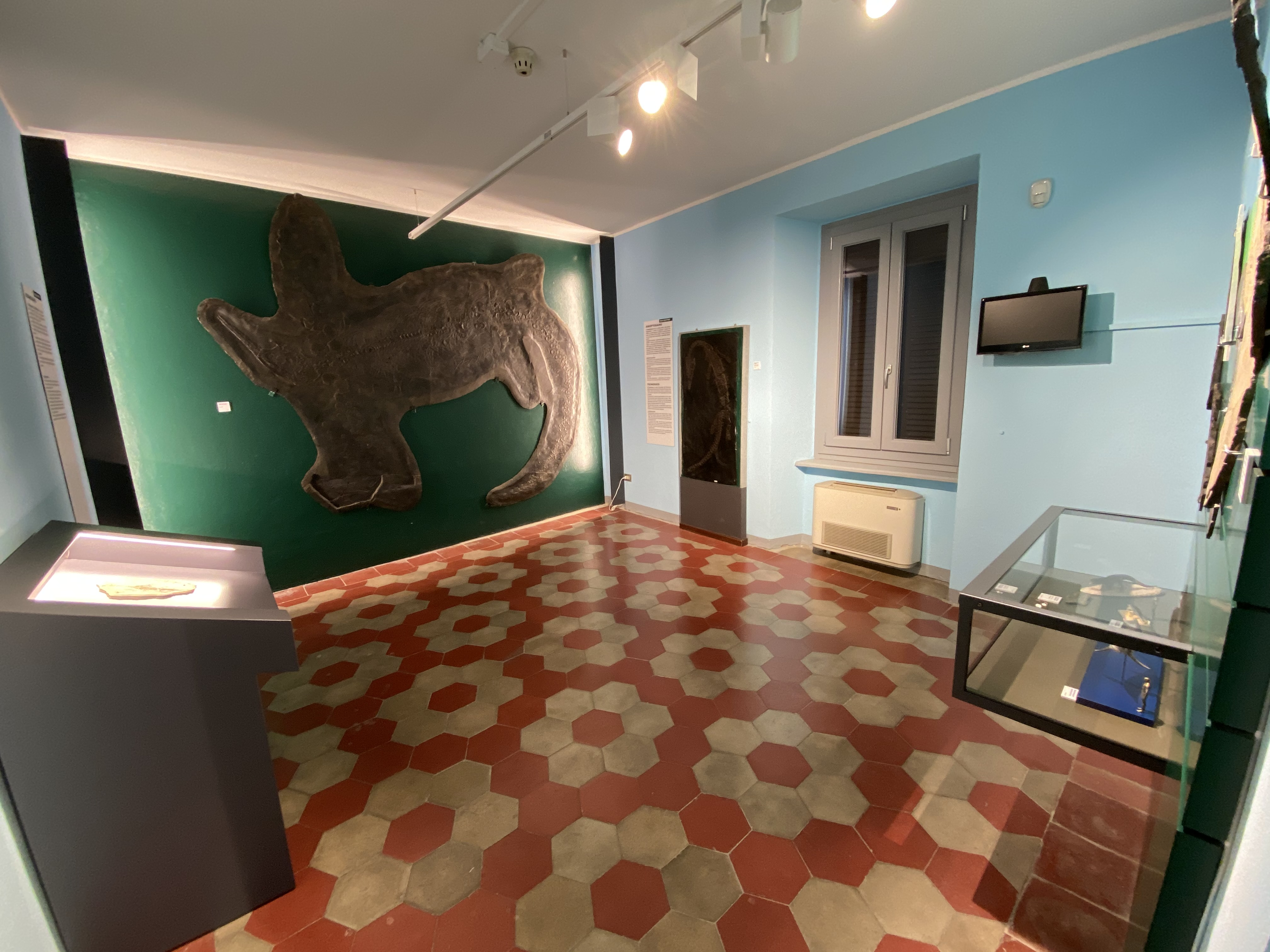
Ichthyosaurus room with the complete fossil of a Besanosaurus

== History ==
Since 1878 the museum's palaeontologists have worked with those at the Natural History Museum of Milan on excavations. The Civic Museum of Fossils of Besano opened to visitors in 1981. In 1992, the museum closed its doors for restoration, and reopened June 17, 2000. The revamped museum featured five exhibit rooms in addition to a didactic laboratory and projecting room.

== Surrounding areaBesano Fossil Museum 1 ==
Besano city is just 15 km from Varese, 70 km from Milan, 35 km from Como and 10 km from Switzerland. The area of Besano and the nearby St. George's Mount are an important paleontological area. The mount was recognized as a UNESCO World Heritage Site in August, 2010, because of the large number of fossils discovered in its quarries.

== The fossils ==
The museum's five rooms shows paleontological finds from the Besano area, including the Besanosaurus, a type of ichthyosaur from the middle Triassic period. The 6 meter Besanosaurus leptorhynchus discovered in 1993 is the biggest sea reptile fossil found in Italy, and was probably a pregnant female. Since 2001 the museum has also housed the remains of a Saltriosaurus, discovered in a quarry in Saltrio, which is the first big carnivorous dinosaur found in Lombardia.
