= San Salvatore Dolomite =

Geologic formation in Switzerland and Italy

- Stratigraphic range: Late Anisian (Illyrian)
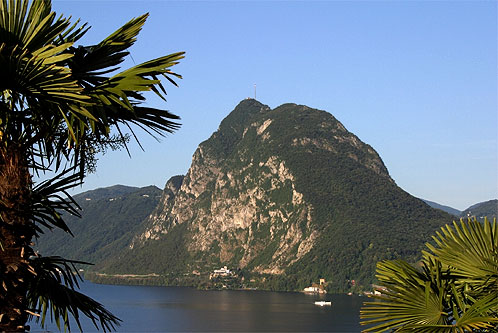
- Monte San Salvatore, which is mostly formed by San Salvatore Dolomite
- Type: Geological formation
- Sub-units: Rasa Dolomite
- Underlies: Besano Formation, Pizzella Marls
- Overlies: Bellano Formation, Fenera Annunziata Sandstone, Pissone Dolomite

Lithology
- Primary: Dolomite

Location
- Region: Lombardy, Piedmont, Ticino
- Country: Italy, Switzerland
- Extent: Southwestern Limestone Alps

Type section
- Named for: Monte San Salvatore
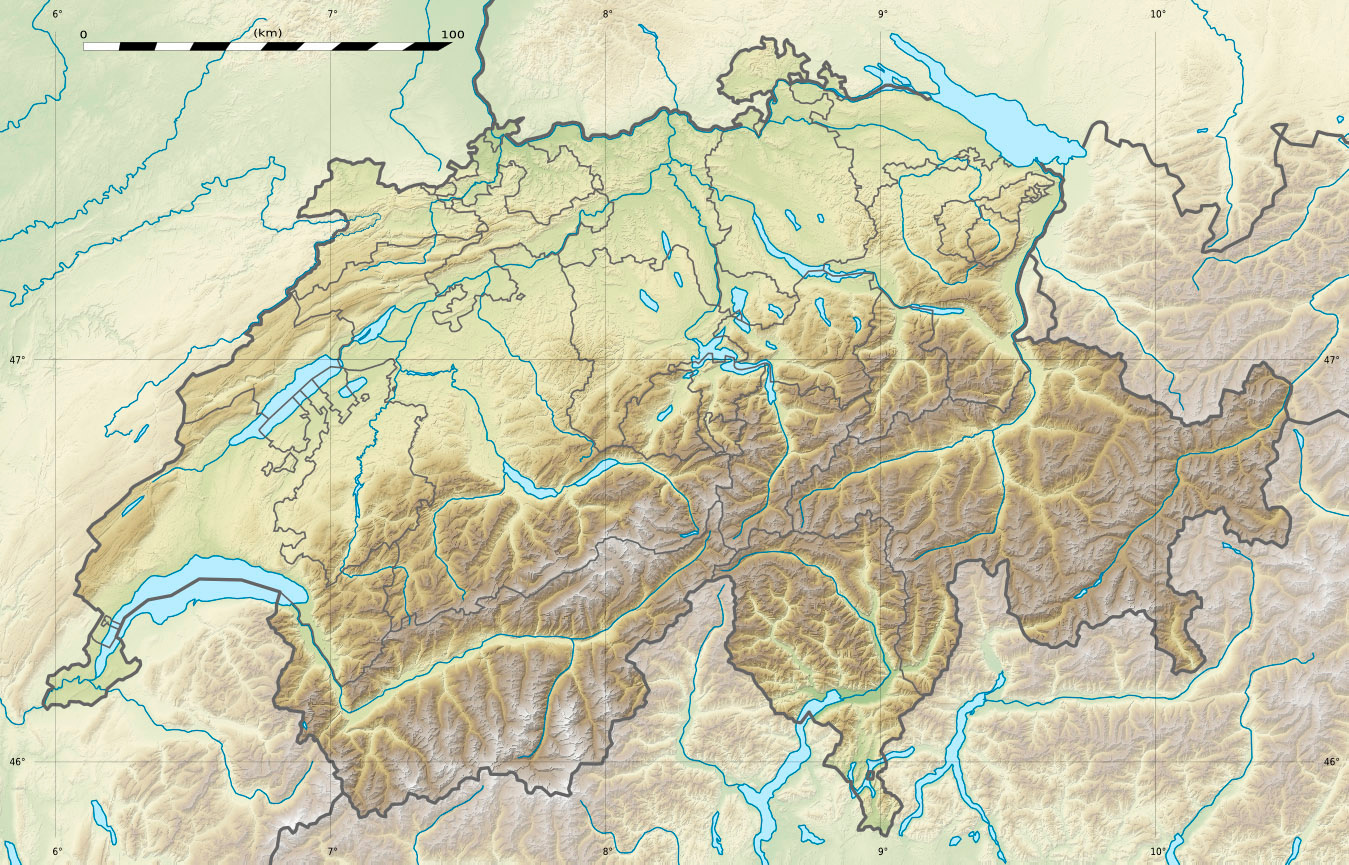
- San Salvatore Dolomite (Switzerland)

The San Salvatore Dolomite, sometimes known as the Salvatore Dolomite or San Salvatore Formation, is a Middle Triassic (late Anisian) geological formation in Switzerland and Italy. The primarily lithology is micritic dolomite with a high proportion of algal mounds (stromatolites). It corresponds to a thick warm-water carbonate platform on the northern edge of an island in what is now the Po Plain. This formation and its local equivalents are common in the hills around Lake Maggiore, Varese, and Lugano, preserving fossils of marine invertebrates such as ammonoids, gastropods, and bivalves. At its southernmost extent on Monte San Giorgio, only the lower part of the San Salvatore Dolomite is preserved. The middle and upper parts are replaced by the Besano Formation, San Giorgio Dolomite, and Meride Limestone, which were deposited in a deeper and more anoxic basin between carbonate platforms.
