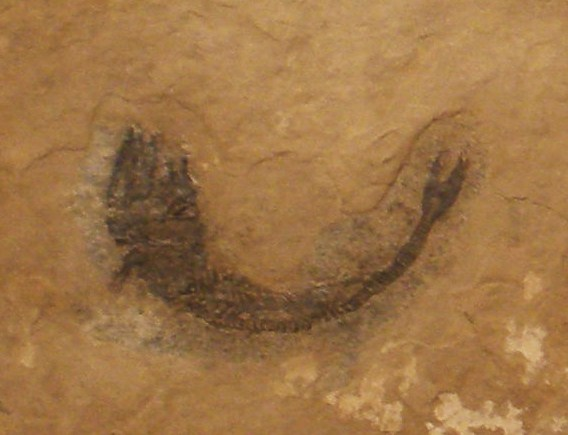

Scientific classification
- Domain: Eukaryota
- Kingdom: Animalia
- Phylum: Chordata
- Class: Actinopterygii
- Order: †Pholidopleuriformes
- Genus: †Pholidopleurus; Bronn, 1858

= Pholidopleurus =

Extinct genus of fishes

Pholidopleurus is an extinct genus of prehistoric ray-finned fish.

== See also ==
- Prehistoric fish
- List of prehistoric bony fish
