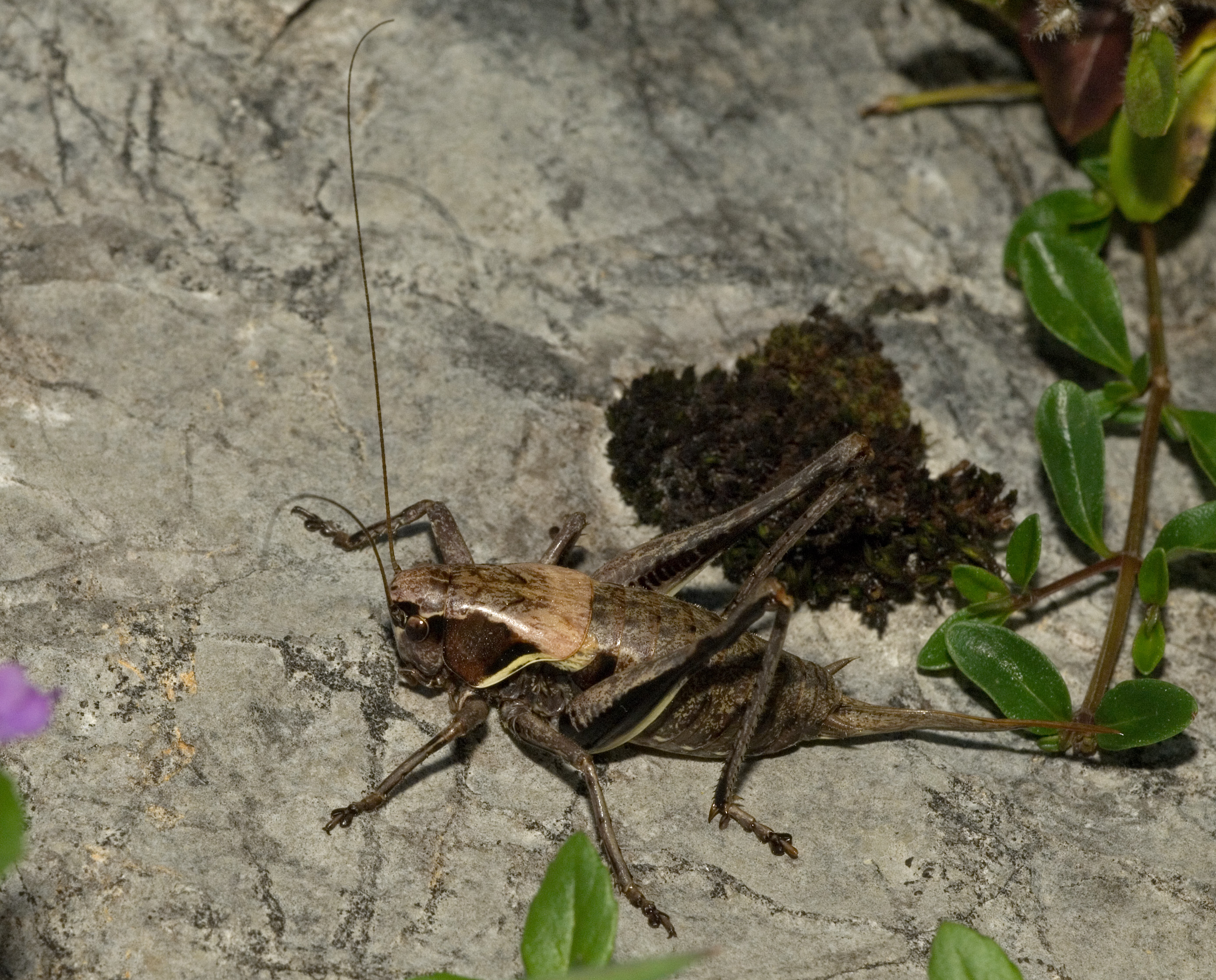
- Pholidoptera aptera female
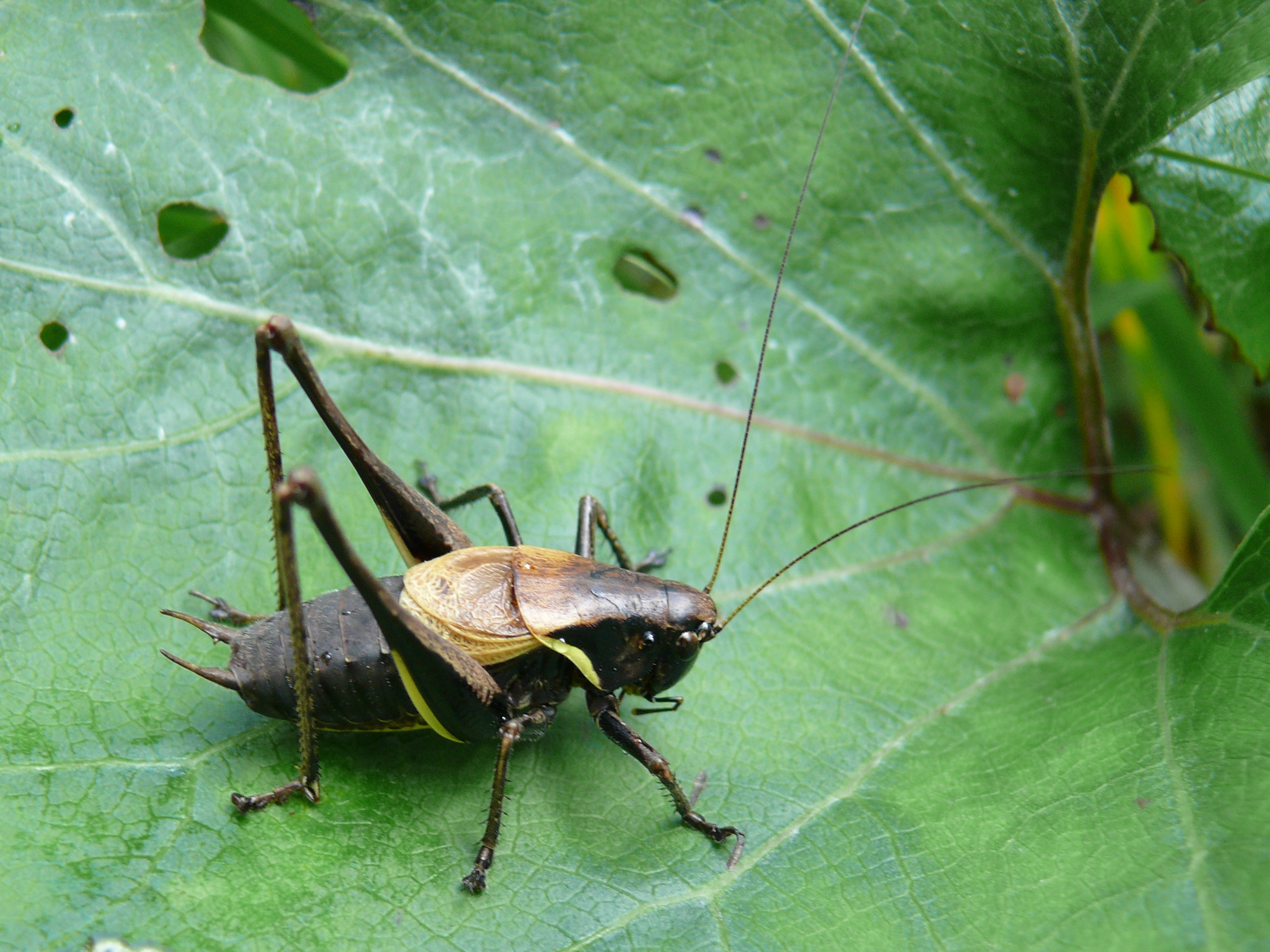
- Male

Conservation status
- Least Concern (IUCN 3.1)

Scientific classification
- Kingdom: Animalia
- Phylum: Arthropoda
- Class: Insecta
- Order: Orthoptera
- Suborder: Ensifera
- Family: Tettigoniidae
- Subfamily: Tettigoniinae
- Tribe: Pholidopterini
- Genus: Pholidoptera
- Species: P. aptera

Binomial name
- Pholidoptera aptera (Fabricius, 1793)

= Pholidoptera aptera =

Species of cricket-like animal

Pholidoptera aptera, the alpine dark bush-cricket, is a species of a cricket belonging to the subfamily Tettigoniinae. It is found in Eastern and Central Europe in the Alps and the Alpine foothills. In Switzerland, their presence limited to the eastern Alps, the Southern Alps and the Schaffhauser Randen. In Germany, it occurs south of the line Bodensee, to southern Munich. It also occurs in Austria and Slovenia. It is found at altitudes from 260 to 2360 meters above sea level in densely forested clearings or clearcuts, high-altitude orchards, bracken slopes, rocky, dwarf shrub communities and areas densely populated with grasses and herbaceous plants. At high altitudes, warm southern slopes are preferred.

Close-Up of a Pholidoptera aptera
