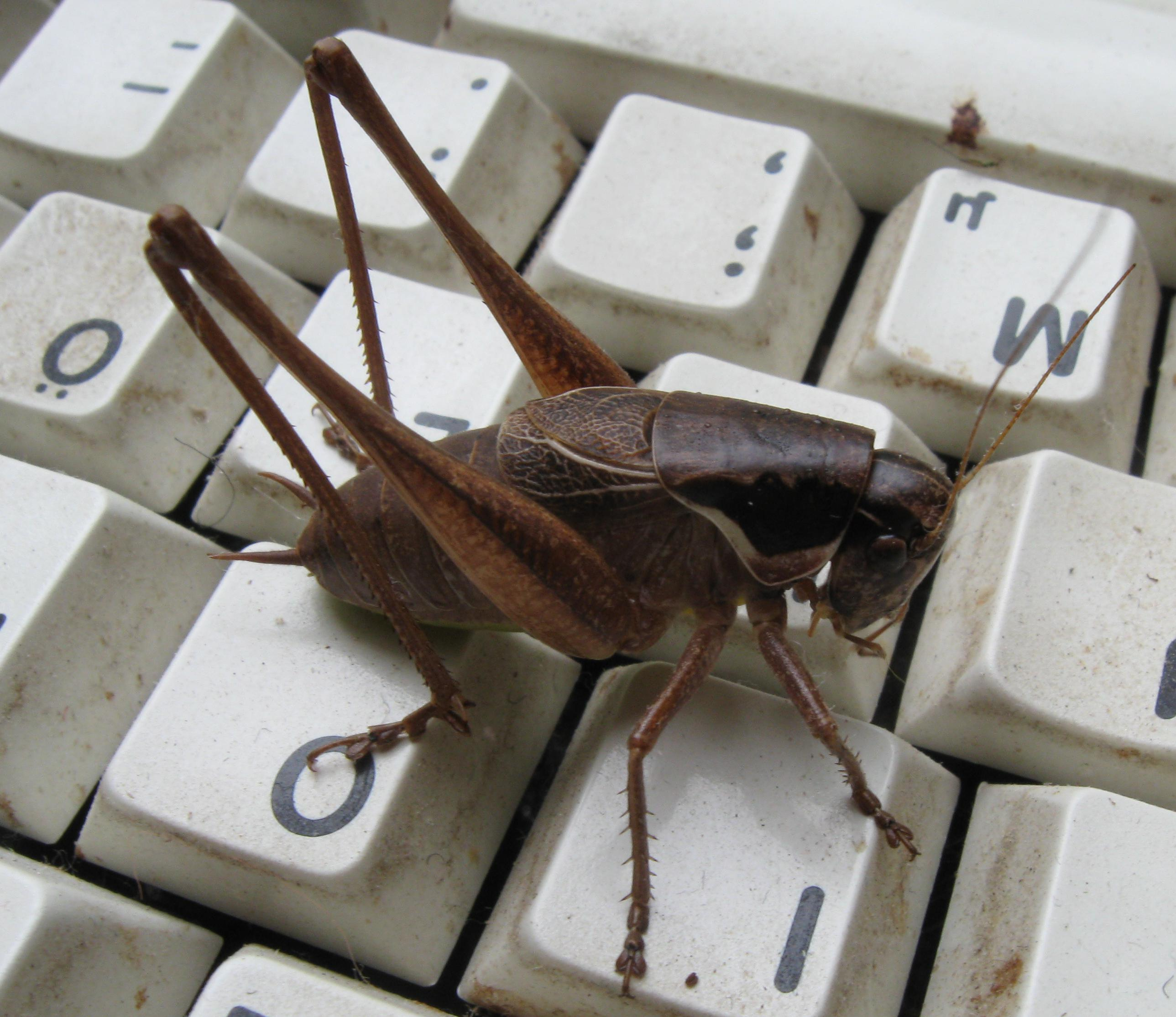
- Pholidoptera littoralis male

Scientific classification
- Kingdom: Animalia
- Phylum: Arthropoda
- Clade: Pancrustacea
- Class: Insecta
- Order: Orthoptera
- Suborder: Ensifera
- Family: Tettigoniidae
- Genus: Pholidoptera
- Species: P. littoralis

Binomial name
- Pholidoptera littoralis (Fieber, 1853)

= Pholidoptera littoralis =

Species of cricket-like animal

Pholidoptera littoralis is a species of insect belonging to the family Tettigoniidae subfamily Tettigoniinae. It is found from Greece across much of the Balkan Peninsula on to the Italian Alpine foothills, Switzerland and Austria to Germany, the Czech Republic, Poland and Slovakia, where it is less common.

Close-Up of a Pholidoptera littoralis
