= Pholidopleuridae =

Pholidopleuridae Temporal range: Triassic

Scientific classification
- Kingdom: Animalia
- Phylum: Chordata
- Class: Actinopterygii
- Subclass: Neopterygii (?)
- Order: †Pholidopleuriformes; Berg, 1937
- Family: †Pholidopleuridae; Wade, 1932

Genera
- See text

Extinct order of fishes

Pholidopleuriformes is an extinct order of ray-finned fish containing a single family, Pholidopleuridae.

== Classification ==
  - Family †Pholidopleuridae Abel, 1919 / Wade, 1932
    - Genus †Arctosomus Berg 1941 [Neavichthys Whitley, 1951]
      - †Arctosomus sibiricus Berg, 1941
    - Genus †Australosomus Berg, 1941
      - †Australosomus altisquamosus Beltan, 1980
      - †Australosomus kochi Stensiö, 1932
      - †Australosomus longirostris Beltan, 1968
      - †Australosomus pholidopleuroides Nielsen, 1949
      - †Australosomus simplex Nielsen, 1949
      - †Australosomus stockleyi Haughton, 1936
    - Genus †Gracilignathichthys Bürgin, 1992
      - †Gracilignathichthys microlepis Bürgin, 1992
    - Genus †Macroaethes Wade, 1932
      - †M. alta Wade, 1935
      - †M. brookvalei Wade, 1932
    - Genus †Pholidopleurus Bronn, 1858
      - †P. ticinensis Bürgin, 1992
      - †P. xiaowaensis Liu & Yin, 2006
      - †P. typus Bronn, 1858

== Bibliography ==
- Sepkoski, Jack (2002). "A compendium of fossil marine animal genera". Bulletins of American Paleontology. 363: 1–560.
- Tree of Actinopterygii
