= Nannolepis =

Scientific classification
- Domain: Eukaryota
- Kingdom: Animalia
- Phylum: Chordata
- Class: Actinopterygii
- Order: †Peltopleuriformes
- Family: †Peltopleuridae
- Genus: †Nannolepis; Griffith, 1977

Extinct genus of fishes

Nannolepis is an extinct genus of prehistoric bony fish.

== See also ==
- Prehistoric fish
- List of prehistoric bony fish
