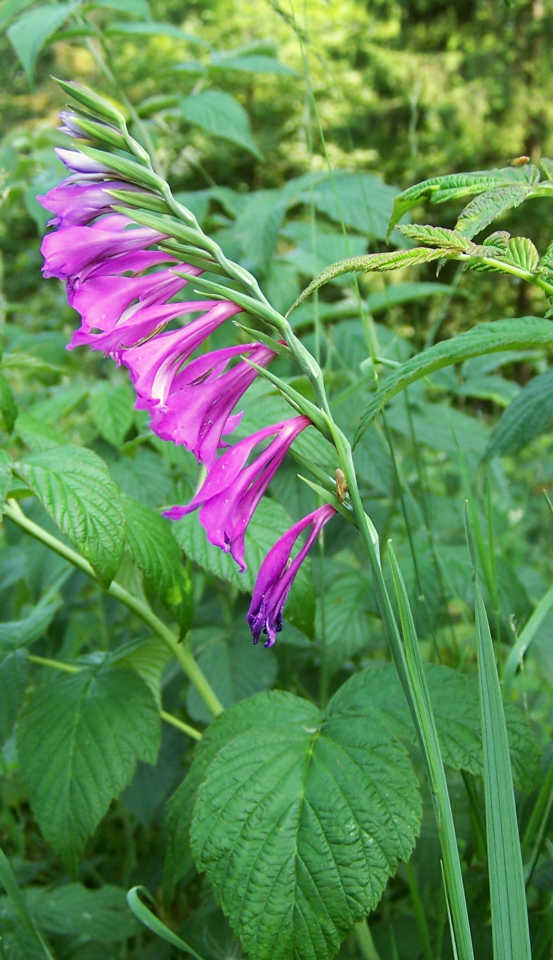

Scientific classification
- Kingdom: Plantae
- Clade: Tracheophytes
- Clade: Angiosperms
- Clade: Monocots
- Order: Asparagales
- Family: Iridaceae
- Genus: Gladiolus
- Species: G. imbricatus

Binomial name
- Gladiolus imbricatus Linné

= Gladiolus imbricatus =

Species of flowering plant

Gladiolus imbricatus, common name Turkish marsh gladiolus, is a herbaceous perennial plant belonging to the genus Gladiolus of the family Iridaceae.

== Description ==
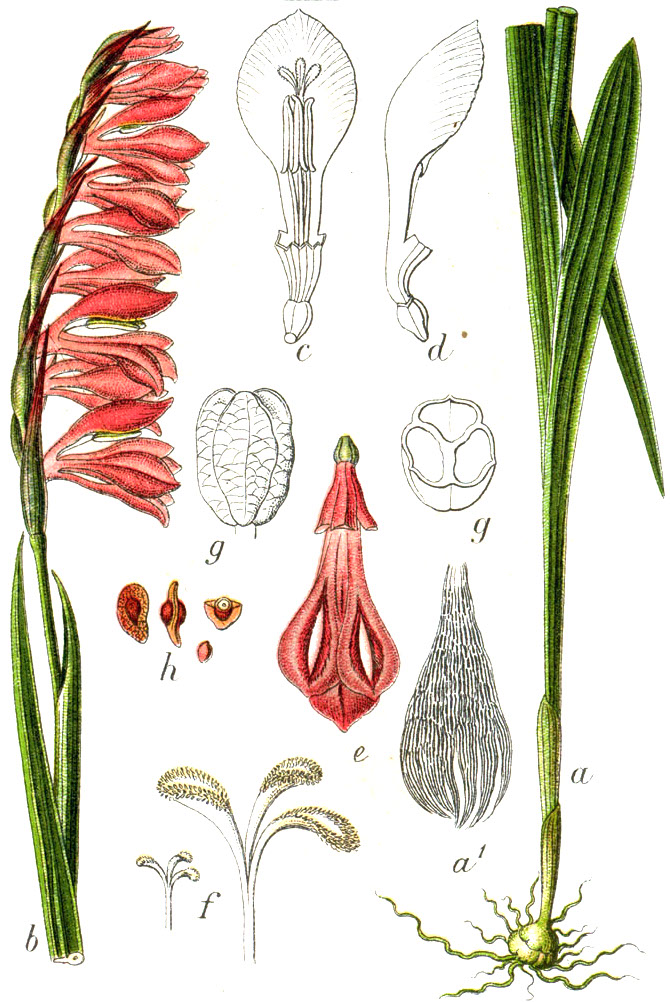
Illustration from Sturm's Flora of Germany (1900–1906)

Gladiolus imbricatus reaches 30–100 centimetres (12–40 in) of height. The stem is erect, glabrous and unbranched, the corm is spherical, surrounded with parallel fibers. The leaves are shorter than the stem, simple, with a parallel venation, sword-shaped and more than 10 millimetres wide. The one-sided inflorescence is composed of 3–12 hermaphroditic flowers. The flowering period of Gladiolus imbricatus lasts for a few weeks in the period from June to July, depending on the location and the weather. Pollination takes place by insects, primarily bees or bumblebees.

The relatively heavy winged capsule fruits (~1.7 mg) ripen within one to two month after flowering, from end of July until September. The capsules have excellent swimming properties (in laboratory tests, up to 50% still float after 30 days) and are dispersed via hydrochory or, especially on pastures, via zoochory. One plant can produce 200–400 capsules per growing season, and the seeds require a cold period of several months to germinate during rising temperatures in spring. Cloning (vegetative production) is an additional form of reproduction that, depending on the source, is rarer or more common than propagation via seeds. The most critical phase is the establishment of the seedlings. Although germination itself does not require light, it is necessary for their survival that the litter layer is not too dense and that the vegetation allows plenty of light to pass through.

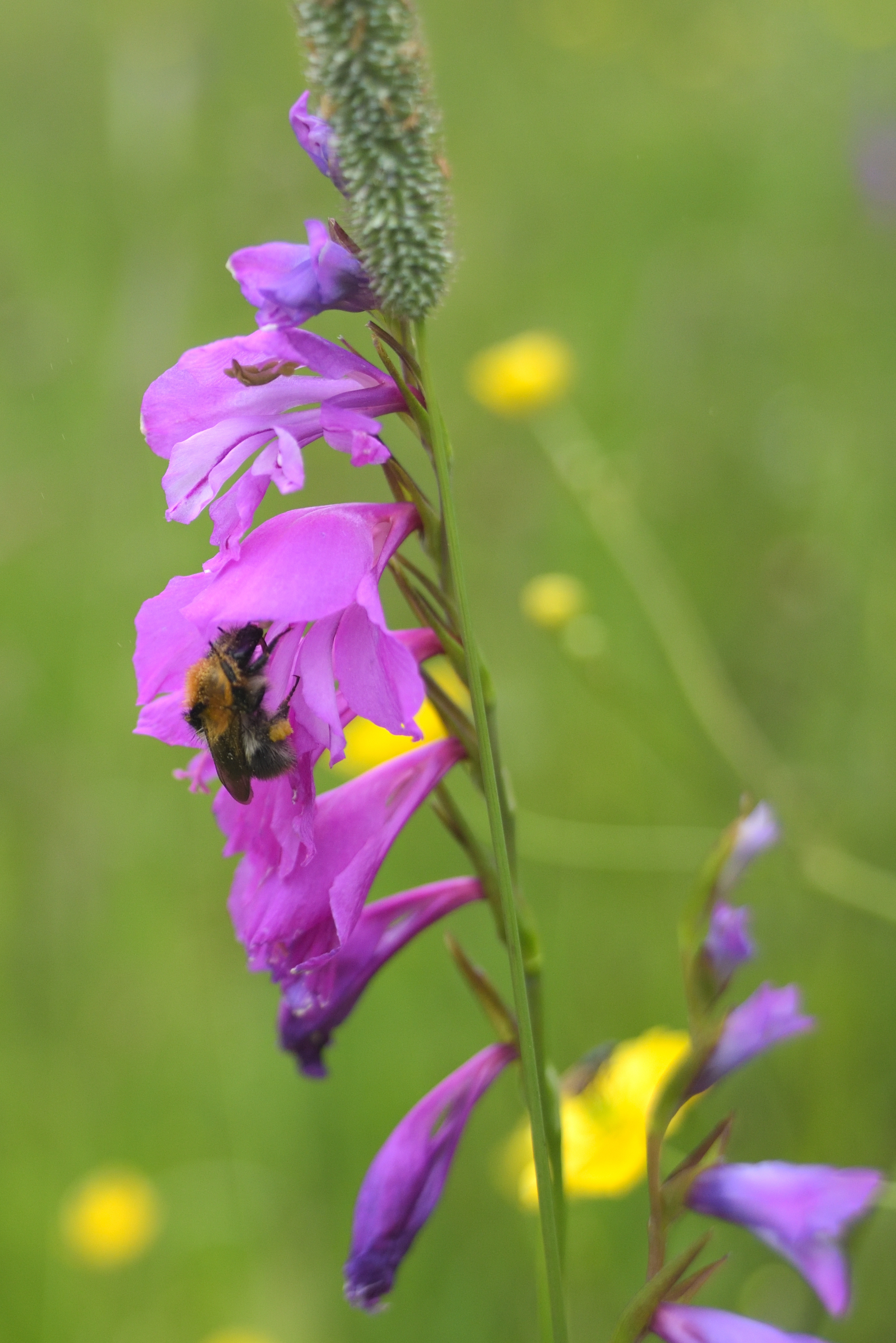
Gladiolus imbricatus visited by a bumblebee

Chromosome number is 2n = 60, the same as Gladiolus palustris.

=== Identification ===
Distinguishing between three Gladiolus species native to Germany (taken from):

Feature	G. communis	G. imbricatus	G. palustris
Leaf width	> 10 mm	> 10 mm	< 10 mm
Total height	50 – 100 cm	30 – 80(100) cm	30 – 60 cm
Bottom stemleaf	pointed (?)	blunt	pointed
Number of flowers	5–10–20	(3)–6–12	2–6
Inflorescence	± 2-rowed	one-sided	all directions
Corm	fibers parallel (?)	Fibers parallel	Fibers net-like

== Distribution ==
This species is found in Central and East Europe, also in the countries of the Mediterranean Sea, Caucasus and Western Siberia. It is possibly most abundant in the coastal meadows of Luitemaa Nature Reserve in southwestern Estonia.

=== Habitat ===
Gladiolus imbricatus prefers habitats with variable moisture levels (keyword: mesophyte) and lime-free soils that can be poor to nutrient-richer. Accordingly, the plant is common in flood-meadows and coastal meadows. Due to its light requirements for germination, this meadow species is rarely found in forests, but mainly in open grasslands.
