= Besano =

- Comune
- Comune di Besano
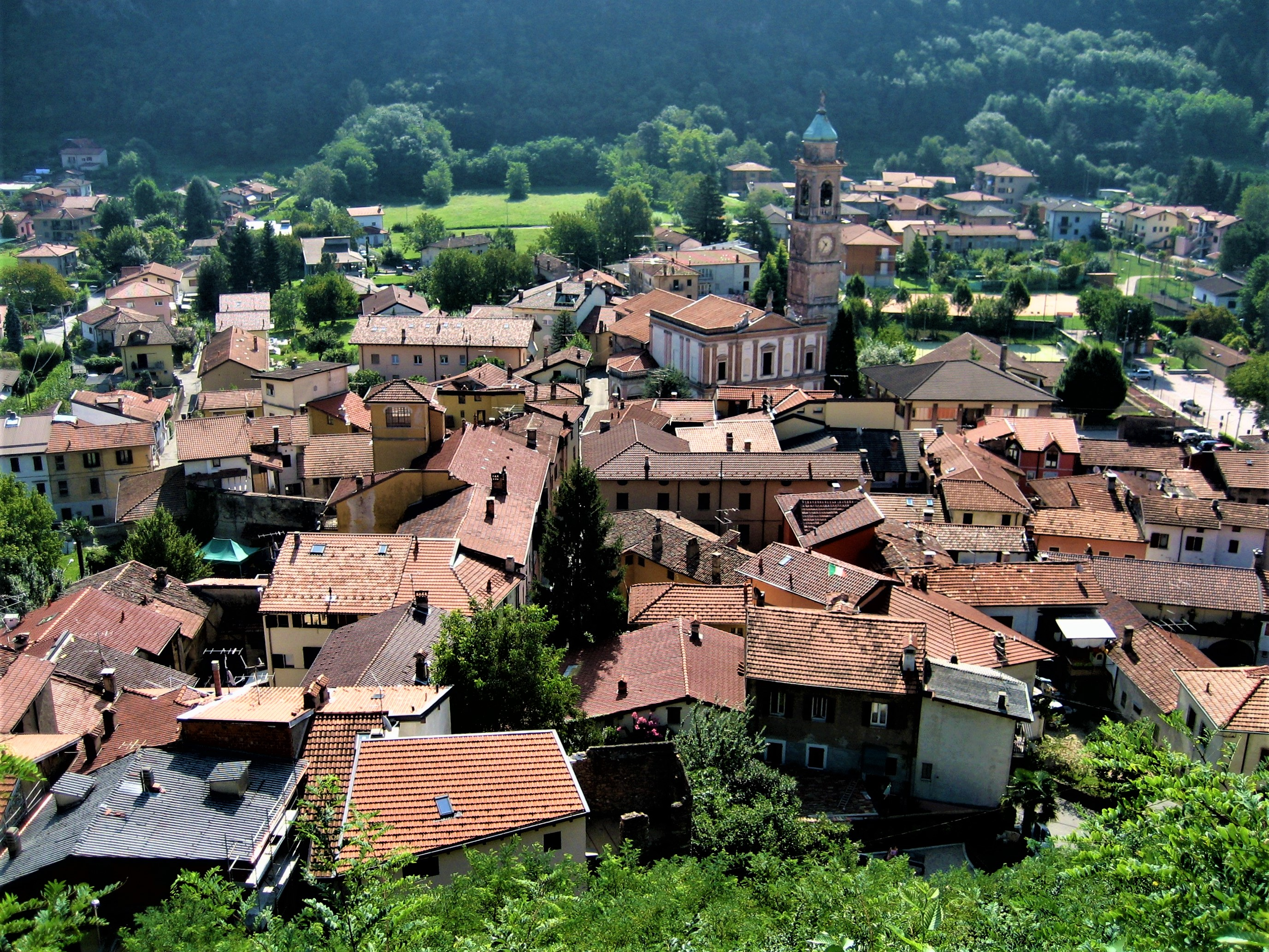
- View of Besano

- Location within Italy Location within Lombardy
- Coordinates: 45°53′N 08°53′E
- Country: Italy
- Region: Lombardy
- Province: Varese (VA)

Area
  - Total: 3 km^{2} (1.2 sq mi)

Population (2018-01-01)
  - Total: 2,350
  - Density: 780/km^{2} (2,000/sq mi)
- Time zone: UTC+1 (CET)
  - Summer (DST): UTC+2 (CEST)
- Postal code: 21050
- Dialing code: 0332

Besano is a town and comune located in the province of Varese, in the Lombardy region of northern Italy.

== Paleontological site ==
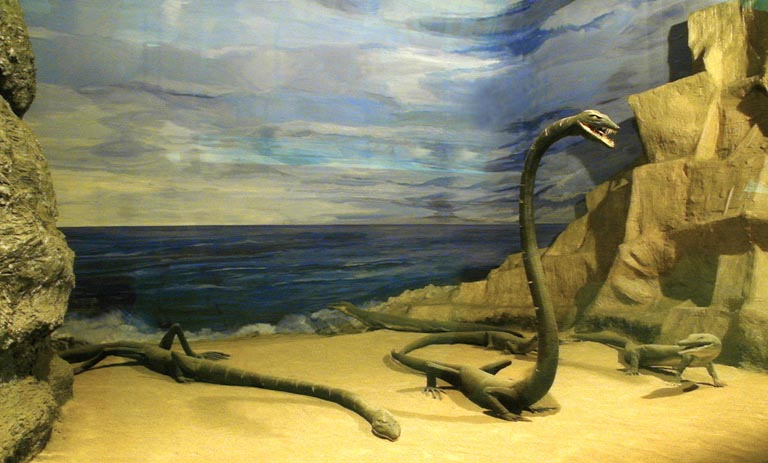
Reconstruction of the sea of Besano, at Museo Civico di Storia Naturale of Milan. There are two Tanystropheus and some Askeptosaurus.

=== The fossils of Besano ===
In 1993 the fossil of a Triassic aquatic reptile dating back to about 235 million years was found near the town. It was named Besanosaurus. Many other fossils have emerged from the fossiliferous field of Besano-Monte San Giorgio, known and appreciated since the mid-nineteenth century.
