= Helmolepis =

Helmolepis Temporal range: Early Triassic (Induan-Olenekian)

Scientific classification
- Kingdom: Animalia
- Phylum: Chordata
- Class: Actinopterygii
- Order: †Platysiagiformes
- Family: †Platysiagidae
- Genus: †Helmolepis; Stensiö, 1932

Type species
- †Helmolepis gracilis Stensiö, 1932

Other species
- †H. cyphognathus Neuman & Mutter, 2005; †H. manis Mutter, 2005

Extinct genus of ray-finned fishes

Helmolepis is an extinct genus of marine ray-finned fish that lived during the Early Triassic placed within the family Platysiagidae. Specimens of the fish have been found in both the upper and lower hemisphere, being found in Greenland, Canada, and Madagascar. All members of the genus are small with the largest individuals only having a standard length of 90 millimetres (3.5 in) and are all fusiform in shape. The small body size of these fish has been attributed to a reduction the primary production within oceans as a result of the Permian Mass Extinction. There are currently three valid species of the genus being H. gracilis, H. cyphognathus, and H. manis.

== History and Classification ==
Helmolepis was originally named by Erik Stensiö in 1932, the described material was only made up of the holotype of the genus (MGUH VP 3219) which preserved the posterior region of the head from the Wordy Creek Formation. A second specimen (MGUH VP 563) of the type species, H. gracilis, would later be described by Nielsen in 1936 which is noted to have had better preservation that the holotype though had the same measurements. After this more well preserved specimen, comparisons with other genera were able to be made with the most common one at the time being Perleidus due to the similar head shape. The genus was placed within the family Parasemionotidae by Romer (1950), though he along with Lehman would later assign Helmolepis to Perleididae. Three more specimens (MGUH VP 562-4) would be described by Nybelin in 1977 with one of the specimens (MGHVP 564) preserving an almost complete individual.

In 2005, two papers on the genus would be published, both of these papers assigning new species to the genus along with a reassessment of the genus. The first of these papers, Mutter (2005) described a new species, H. cyphognathus, from the Sulphur Mountain Formation in British Columbia based on the holotype (UALVP 19119) along with a large number of other specimens. The preservation of these specimens allowed for a better assessment of the genus in which it was determined to be very similar to Platysiagum, with the paper also assigning the genus to Platysiagidae. The second paper, Neuman & Mutter (2005), would assign two new specimens to the type species (MGUH VP 27740, 27741) and would describe a new species, H. manis, from basin d’Ankitohazo in northwest Madagascar. This paper would also counter previous suggestions that platysiagids were derived from perleidiform though did suggest that they could have shared a common ancestor dating to the early Smithian. Though neither of these papers contain phylogenic analyses of the genus, Helmolepis has been included in a few phylogenies including those by Xu (2021) and Yuan et al. (2022) which consistently place the genus as a member of the family.

Below is the phylogeny by Yuan et al. (2022) showing this placement:

- - Moythomasia durgaringa
  - - Pteronisculus stensioi
    - - Boreosomus
      - - Chondrostei
          - Chondrosteus acipenseroides
          - - Acipenser brevirostrum
            - Peipiaosteus pani
        - Neopterygii
          - - Australosomus kochi
            - Redfieldiiformes
              - - Brookvalia gracilis
                - Daedalichthys higginsi
              - - Helichthys browni
                - Redfieldius gracilis
          - - - Platysiagiformes
                - Helmolepis cyphognathus
                - Platysiagum sinensis
            - - - Polzbergiiformes
                  - Hydropessum kannemeyeri
                  - Polzbergia brochatus
                  - - Cleithrolepidina minor
                    - Cleithrolepis granulate
              - - - Colobodontidae
                    - Chaohuperleidus primus
                    - - Gabanellia agilis
                      - - - Feroxichthys panzhouensis
                          - Feroxichthys yunnanensis
                        - - Colobodus baii
                          - Crenilepis sandbergeri
                          - - Colobodus bassanii
                            - Colobodus giganteus
                - - - Perleididae
                      - Perleidus altolepis
                      - - - Teffichthys elegans
                          - Teffichthys madagascariensis
                        - - Paraperleidus changxingensis
                          - Plesioperleidus yangtzensis
                          - - Meidiichthys browni
                            - Plesiofuro mingshuica
                  - - - Louwoichthyida
                        - - Pseudobeaconiidae
                            - Pseudobeaconia elegans
                            - - Dipteronotus olgiatii
                              - Dipteronotus ornatus
                        - - Louwoichthyidae
                            - Louwoichthys pusillus
                            - - Ctenognathichthys bellottii
                              - Luopingichthys bergi
                          - Peltoperleididae
                            - Peltoperleidus asiaticus
                            - - Peltoperleidus macrodontus
                              - - Peltoperleidus ducanensis
                                - Peltoperleidus obristi
                    - - - Luganoiiformes
                          - Altisolepis bellipinnis
                          - - Fuyuanperleidus dengi
                            - - Luganoia fortuna
                              - Luganoia lepidosteoides
                      - - - Peltopleuriformes
                            - - Peltopleurus rugosus
                              - - Peltopleurus nitidus
                                - Peltopleurus tyrannos
                            - - Moradebrichthys vilasecae
                              - Wushaichthys exquisitus
                              - - Peripeltopleurus hypsisomus
                                - - Thoracopterus niederristi
                                  - - Gigantopterus teller
                                    - Potanichthys xingyiensis
                                    - - "Thoracopterus" magnificus
                                      - "Thoracopterus" martinisi
                        - - Venusichthys comptus
                          - - Habroichthyiformes
                              Habroichthys minimus
                            - Neopterygii crown
                              - Teleostei
                                - Elops hawaiensis
                                - Leptolepis coryphaenoides
                              - Holostei
                                - - Amia calva
                                  - Caturus furcatus
                                - - Kyphosichthys grandei
                                  - - Lepisosteus osseus
                                    - Semionotus elegans

== Description ==
Helmolepis is overall a small, fusiform fish with members of the genus largely having a standard length of 60–90 millimetres (2.4–3.5 in). The body is covered in 37-40 longitudinal rows of relatively thick scales possessing ornamentation. This ornamentation is more present in the anterior region of the body with it appearing as serrations in H. cyphognathus. The anterior region of Helmolepis is also where the scales are at their deepest, specifically within 4-5 flank scale rows. The fins of the fish were entirely jointed though the leading ray of each fin is unjointed and has fringing fulcra. Outside of the caudal fin, all of these fins were small with the dorsal fin originating between the anal and pelvic fins. The large caudal fin of Helmolepis was deeply forked, being made up of branching and segmented lepidotrichia.

The skull of Helmolepis is similar to a number of other earlier ray-finned fish, is short with the eye being placed near the front of the head. The anterior part of the skull is made up by fused rostral bones that, based on some specimens, seem to be also fused with the premaxilla. The jaws go past the orbit and are about 2/3rds of the entire skull length, with the upper jaw being largely make up by the anteriorly narrow maxilla. The posterior plate of the bone is curved downwards, causing it to overlap the dentary. The dentary of the fish is similar in length to the maxilla and is covered in striae which connect to the mandibular canal. Small, conical teeth are present on both the upper and lower jaws with the teeth towards the front of the jaws being slightly smaller than those towards the back. Within the opercular series, the suboperculum is either larger or of equal size to the operculum with this differing between species. This region of the skull seemingly increased in length over time due to the later species having a longer series than earlier members.

=== Species ===
| Species | Age | Location | Localities | Notes | Images |
|---|---|---|---|---|---|
| H. cyphognathus | Smithian | British Columbia | Sulphur Mountain Formation (Vega-Phroso Member) | A species with a total length of 80 millimetres (3.1 in) that differs from the type species based on the thickness of the branchiostegal rays along with differences in the infraorbital sensory canal. Besides the pectoral fins, all fins possess a set of large ridge scales. | |
| H. gracilis | Griesbachian | Greenland | Wordy Creek Formation ("Cape Stosch" Site) | The type species with a total length of 90 millimetres (3.5 in). Unlike other members of the family, H. gracilis possesses a long, broad dermohyal bone. Along with this, the fish has more branchiostegal rays than any other member of the family. | |
| H. manis | Lower Dienerian | Madagascar | Basin d’Ankitohazo | A poorly known species known from a single specimen that is notable due to its larger supracleithrum and posttemporal along with the number of scale rows on the specimen. The species was the first time that the genus was described in the southern hemisphere. | |

== Paleobiology ==
Helmolepis is the earliest known member of Platysiagidae with the genus being present in both the northern and southern hemispheres at the time with all species being marine. It has been suggested that the small size of the genus, especially in earlier species, could have been a result of the Permian Mass Extinction due to the decrease in the primary production during the time.
