= Hydropessum =

Hydropessum Temporal range: Early Triassic (Olenekian)

Scientific classification
- Kingdom: Animalia
- Phylum: Chordata
- Class: Actinopterygii
- Order: †Polzbergiiformes
- Family: †Hydropessidae; Hutchinson, 1973
- Genus: †Hydropessum; Broom, 1913
- Species: †H. kannemeyeri

Binomial name
- †Hydropessum kannemeyeri Broom, 1913

Extinct genus of fishes

Hydropessum is an extinct genus of freshwater polzbergiiform ray-finned fish from South Africa, it is the only member of the monotypic family Hydropessidae. Its fossils have been found at an unknown locality in the Upper Beaufort Group of the Karoo Supergroup, though the material is known to date to the early Triassic. It was a small fish with a body almost as deep as it was long, being described as diamond-shaped. Some of the more important features of the fish are present in the skull including the length of the maxilla along with the loss of teeth. The latter is what led to it being placed not only with another similar family, Cleithrolepididae, but also within Polzbergiiformes more recently. Only a single species has been described, the type species H. kannemeyeri.

== History and Classification ==
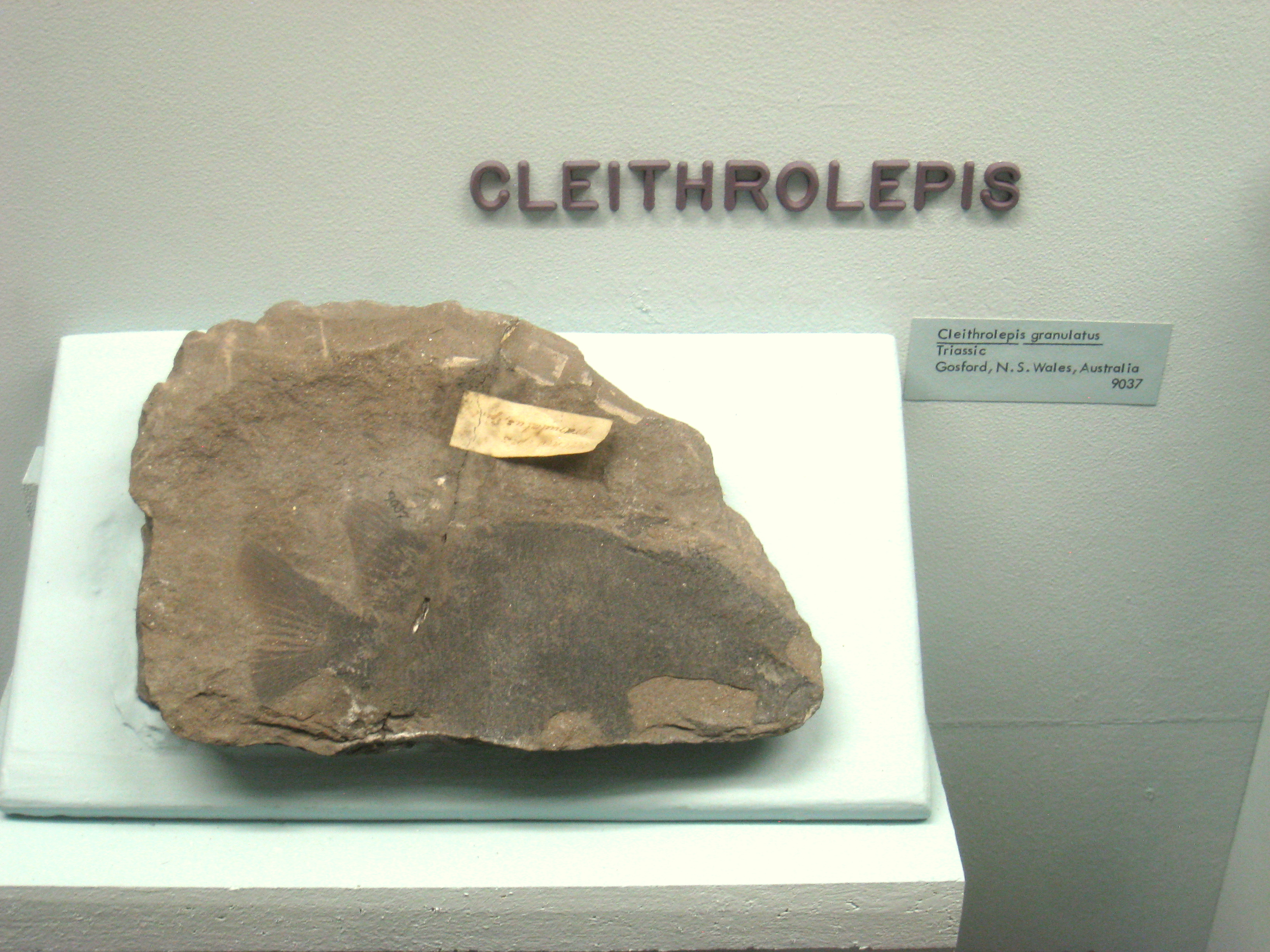
Cleithrolepis granulatus, a genus of fish which Hydropessum consistently places close to in phylogenies

Hydropessum was originally described by Robert Broom in 1913, based on two incomplete specimens found in the collection of Kannemeyer, though this was a short description that would differ from later descriptions in a couple of ways. A more thorough description of the material would be done by Peter Hutchinson in 1973 who would redescribe the anatomy of the fish in a publication revising Triassic fish from the South African region of the Karoo Basin and Brookvale, New South Wales.

Though the exact horizon the specimens are found is unknown, it is known that they were found in the Upper Beaufort Group in South Africa with publications usually giving an early Triassic age to Hydropessum. The type locality most likely dates to the Spathian stage of the Olenekian.

=== Classification ===
Though no classification of Hydropessum was included in the publication, a 1935 paper by Wade placed the genus within Cleithrolepididae. In 1940, Berg placed the family including Hydropessum within Perleidiformes, only for Lehman to argue that the genus should be assigned to Perleididae. It was not until 1973 that Hutchinson assigned the fish to its own monotypic family, Hydropessidae, in his reassessment of the genus. A 2008 publication by López-Arbarello and Zavattieri included a phylogenic analyses containing the genus which would agree with this placement, along with strengthening previous suggestions that the genus was closely related to another family of deep-bodied fish, Cleithrolepididae. Within the order, these two groups were grouped together, due to features such as the loss of teeth in the jaws of the fish and the amount of fin rays present in the caudal fin. A second publication by Sun and coauthors in 2012 corroborated the phylogenic position found by the previous authors. Below are the phylogenic trees from both of these publications showing the placement of Hydropessum.

López-Arbarello & Zavattieri (2008)

- - Cheirolepis
  - - Moythomasia
    - - Boreosomus
      - - Ctenognathichthys
        - Felberia
        - - Fuyuanperleidus
          - Perleidus
          - - Ctenognathichthys
            - Peltoperleidus
          - Dipteronotus
          - - - Manlietta
              - - - - Meidiicthys
                    - - Mendocinichthys
                      - Pseudobeaconia
                  - - Hydropessum
                    - - Cleithrolepis
                      - Cleithrolepidina

Sun et al. (2012)

- - Cheirolepis
  - - Moythomasia
    - - Boreosomus
      - - Peltoperleidus
        - Meridensia
        - Perleidus
        - - - Ctenognathichthys
            - Manlietta
          - - - - Hydropessum
                - - Cleithrolepis
                  - Cleithrolepidina
              - - Felberia
                - Dipteronotus
            - - Meidiicthys
              - - Mendocinichthys
                - Pseudobeaconia

The placement of Hydropessum changed in 2022 when Zhiwei Yuan and coauthors published a paper that partially focused on Perleidiformes, acting as a reassessment for the order. In this publication, Hydropessum and Gabanellia were reassigned to other stem-neopterygian orders. The removal of Hydropessum from the order was due to features such as the reduction in teeth seen along with the location of the skull where the maxilla ended. Below is the phylogenic tree within Zhiwei Yuan et al. (2022) focusing on the placement of Hydropessum in comparison to the order it was assigned to in previous publications.

- - - Neopterygii
      - Redfieldiiformes
      - - Platysiagiformes
        - - Polzbergiiformes
            - Hydropessum kannemeyeri
            - Polzbergia brochatus
            - - Cleithrolepis granulate
              - Cleithrolepis minor
          - - Colobodontidae
            - - Louwoichthyiformes
                - Peltoperleididae
                - Louwoichthyidae
                - Pseudobeaconiidae

== Description ==
Hydropessum was a small, deep fish that had a total body length of 95 millimetres (3.7 in). It was almost as deep as it was long with a maximum depth of 77 millimetres (3.0 in) causing the fish to be almost diamond-shaped.

=== Skull and pectoral girdle ===
Similar to the rest of the body, the skull of Hydropessum is deep with it being deepest at the back. The premaxilla of the fish is much smaller than the maxilla, though both bones are small compared to the rest of the skull, making up only half of the upper jaw length. The rest of the snout of the fish was made up of the postrostral bone along with the nasal bones that it was between. Though not completely preserved, its likely that they large bones would have made up the front edge of the orbit. The rest of the edges are made up of the two infraorbitals, two supraorbitals, and the dermosphenotic bone. The dentary is also not completely preserved, though there is enough preserved to tell that it would have been very shallow are the front only to deepen posteriorly. Unlike a majority of other stem-neopterygians, tooth reduction is seen in both the upper and lower jaws, with them being entirely absent in Hydropessum.

The skull roof of Hydropessum is largely made up of the frontal bone which is deepest at around the middle of the bone. Though much shorter than the frontal, the parietal is also deep. Unlike closely related fish such as Cleithrolepidina, the fish lacked a bone that would have been between the extrascapular and operculum. Due to the depth of the posterior end of the skull, the bones that make up the opercular series of the fish are large with all of the bones that make it up having rugae. These rugae have an origin in the anterodorsal part of the operculum and anteroventral part of the subopercle only to radiate throughout the respective bones. Together, these bones form a deep, D-shaped plate which results in the sloping of the upper jaw margin of the fish. Like the rest of the bones that make up the opercular series, the L-shaped preopercle is similarly deep. A suture between this bone and the maxilla is present, though the two bones are separated by an extra small bone referred to as the "accessory preopercular". Only 6-7 branchiostegal rays found within the series. Similar to the bones of the opercular series, the bones that make up the pectoral girdle are rugose. The most notable feature of the girdle is the very large supracleithrum.

=== Postcranium ===
The postcranial skeleton of Hydropessum is generally not as well preserved as the skull, though features such as the fins and scales are partially known. The base of the anal and dorsal fins of the fish are located at the deepest point of body, almost parallel to one another. Both of these fins are generally similar with the anterior part having fin rays that are much more tightly packed together towards the back. Within specimens, there are some differences seen in the fin ray morphology of the two fins with the dorsal fin showing no evidence of jointing but evidence of bifurcation along with the anal fin showing evidence of the inverse. Even with this being the case, it is most likely that both of the fins would have possessed both of these features with them just simply not being preserved in specimens. Another result of the preservation is that not much of the fins themselves are preserved so the exact shape and amount of fin rays are unknown. Similar to the unpaired fins mentioned, the pectoral and pelvic fins of the fish are poorly preserved with there not being any evidence of pelvic fins as a whole. The only well preserved fin of the fish is the caudal fin with it being small and forked. The fin is made from a total of 30 rays and, similar to the other unpaired fins, had more tightly packed fin rays towards the front of the fins.

The scales of the Hydropessum are organized in a total of 34 rows down the body, with them being the deepest at the lateral line of the fish, with this reaching an extreme of scales being 10 times deeper than they are long. These scales also possess long rugae similar to what is seen in bones in the skull. Even with this being the case, the back edge of these scales are smooth. In contrast to this, the scales at the dorsal and ventral edges of the fish are square-shaped and are less rugose than those seen on the flanks. The scales that contrast the most from the rest are located near the anal fin, where they are much smaller than other regions of the body.
