= Boreichthys =

Boreichthys Temporal range: Norian

Scientific classification
- Domain: Eukaryota
- Kingdom: Animalia
- Phylum: Chordata
- Class: Actinopterygii
- Family: †Colobodontidae
- Genus: †Boreichthys; Selezneva, 1982
- Species: †B. skolai

Binomial name
- †Boreichthys skolai Selezneva, 1982

Extinct genus of fishes

Boreichthys is an extinct genus of prehistoric ray-finned fish that lived during the Late Triassic epoch (possibly Norian age) in what is now Franz-Josef Land, Arkhangelsk Oblast, Russia.

== See also ==
- Prehistoric fish
- List of prehistoric bony fish
