= Chrotichthys =

Chrotichthys Temporal range: Anisian

Scientific classification
- Domain: Eukaryota
- Kingdom: Animalia
- Phylum: Chordata
- Class: Actinopterygii
- Order: †Perleidiformes
- Genus: †Chrotichthys; Wade, 1940
- Species: †C. gregarius

Binomial name
- †Chrotichthys gregarius (Woodward, 1890)

Synonyms
- †Pholidophorus gregarius Woodward, 1890

Extinct genus of fishes

Chrotichthys is an extinct genus of prehistoric freshwater ray-finned fish that lived in the Anisian stage of the Middle Triassic epoch. It contains a single species, C. gregarius, known from the Terrigal Formation of New South Wales, Australia.

Initially considered the earliest known representative of the "pholidophorid" fishes (as Pholidophorus gregarius), it is now generally considered a perleidiform.

== See also ==
- Prehistoric fish
- List of prehistoric bony fish
