= Terrigal Formation =

Geologic formation in Australia

- Stratigraphic range: Early–Middle Triassic (Olenekian-Anisian) ~248.1–244.2 Ma
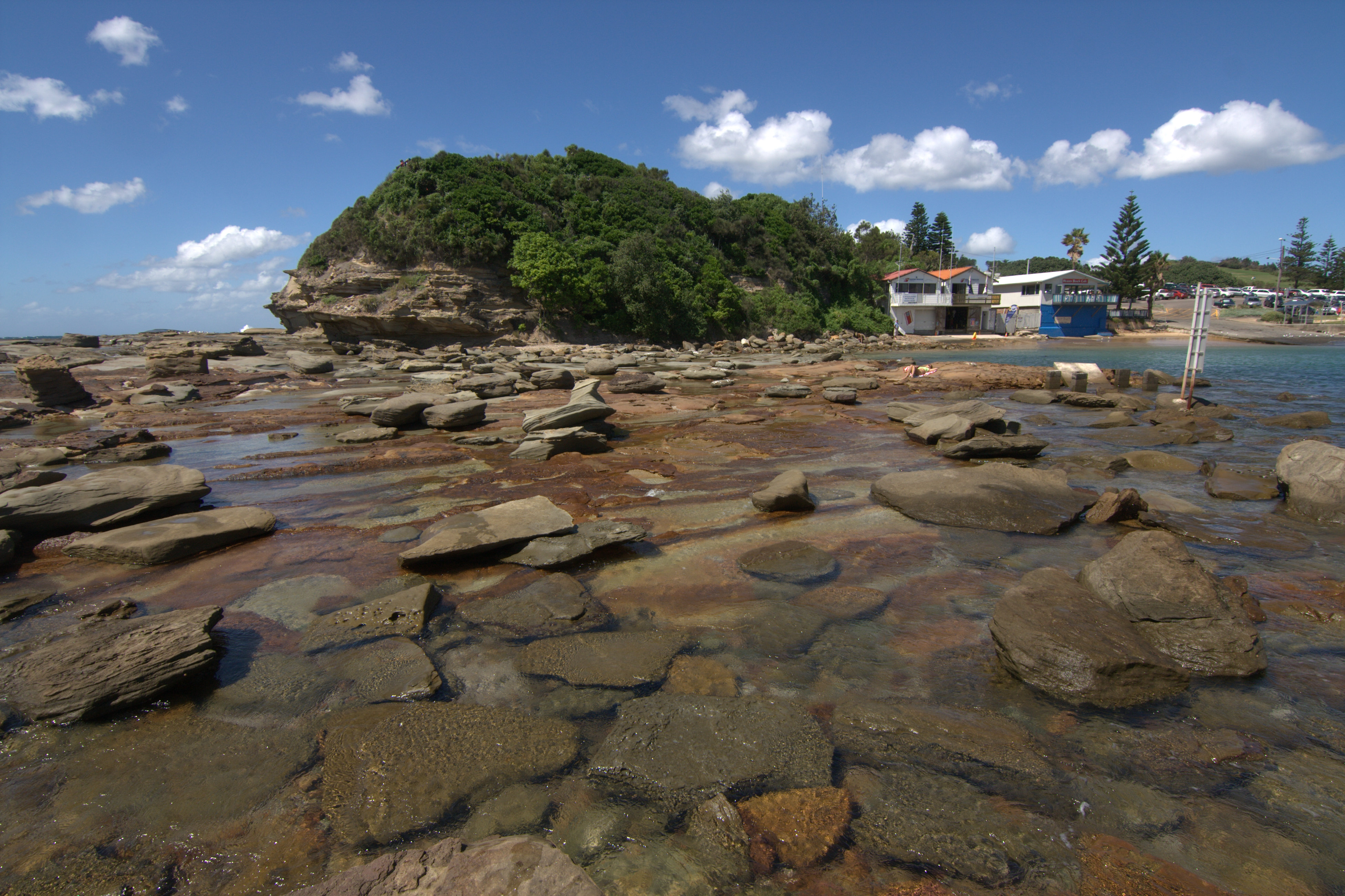
- Terrigal, Central Coast, Australia
- Type: Geological formation
- Unit of: Narrabeen Group
- Underlies: Hawkesbury Sandstone
- Thickness: up to 330 metres (1,080 ft)

Lithology
- Primary: Sandstone and siltstone
- Other: Claystone

Location
- Coordinates: 33.4267°S 151.342°E (Gosford Quarry)
- Region: New South Wales
- Country: Australia
- Extent: Sydney Basin
- Terrigal Formation (Australia) Terrigal Formation (New South Wales)

The Terrigal Formation is a geologic formation in the Sydney Basin in eastern Australia. Commonly seen in the Central Coast region, this stratum is up to 330 metres thick. Formed in the early to mid Triassic, it is part of the Narrabeen Group of sedimentary rocks. This formation includes interbedded fine to medium-grained sandstone and siltstone, with minor deposits of claystone. Hawkesbury Sandstone occasionally overlies the Terrigal Formation.

Numerous fossils are known from this area, including the temnospondyl amphibians Arenaerpeton supinatus and Platycepsion wilksoni, as well as several species of various kinds of fish, most of whom were described from the Gosford Quarry, including the eponymous Gosfordia. Some of these species, namely Cleithrolepis, Gosfordia, Myriolepis and Saurichthys, are also known from the Sydney Sandstone, showing a limited degree of faunal continuity in that formation.

== Fossil content ==
Paleobiota of the Terrigal Formation
Genus	Species	Clade	Images
Apateolepis	A. australis	Palaeoniscidiformes, Palaeoniscidae	
Arenaerpeton	A. supinatus	Temnospondyli, Chigutisauridae	Arenaerpeton supinatus (AM F125866) skull and partial skeleton.
Chrotichthys	C. gregarius	Perleidiformes, incertae sedis	
Cleithrolepis	C. altus	Perleidiformes, Cleithrolepididae	Fossil of C. altus. (Sydney S.s.)
Cleithrolepis	C. granulatus	Perleidiformes, Cleithrolepididae	Fossil of C. granulatus. (Sydney S.s.)
Dictyopyge	D. illustrans	Redfieldiiformes, Redfieldiidae	
Dictyopyge	D. robusta	Redfieldiiformes, Redfieldiidae	
Dictyopyge	D. symmetrica	Redfieldiiformes, Redfieldiidae	
Gosfordia	G. truncata	Ceratodontiformes,Ceratodontidae	Fossil of G. truncata. (Sydney S.s.)
Myriolepis	M. clarkei	Palaeoniscidiformes, Palaeoniscidae	Fossil of M. clarkei. (Sydney S.s.)
Myriolepis	M. lata	Palaeoniscidiformes, Palaeoniscidae	Fossil of M. lata. (Sydney S.s.)
Platycepsion	P. wilksoni	Temnospondyli, Brachyopidae	
Peltopleurus	P. dubius	Peltopleuriformes, Peltopleuridae	
Pristisomus	P. crassus	Perleidiformes, Perleididae	Fossil of Pristisomus latus.
Pristisomus	P. gracilis	Perleidiformes, Perleididae	Fossil of Pristisomus latus.
Pristisomus	P. latus	Perleidiformes, Perleididae	Fossil of Pristisomus latus.
Saurichthys	S. gigas	Saurichthyiformes, Saurichthyidae	Fossil of S. gigas. (Sydney S.s.)
Saurichthys	S. gracilis	Saurichthyiformes, Saurichthyidae	Fossil of S. gigas. (Sydney S.s.)
Semionotus	S. australis	Semionotiformes, Semionotidae	
Semionotus	S. tenuis	Semionotiformes, Semionotidae	

== See also ==
- Sydney Basin
- Munmorah Conglomerate
- Newport Formation
- Narrabeen group
