= Helsby Sandstone Formation =

Geological formation in England

- Stratigraphic range: Middle Triassic Anisian
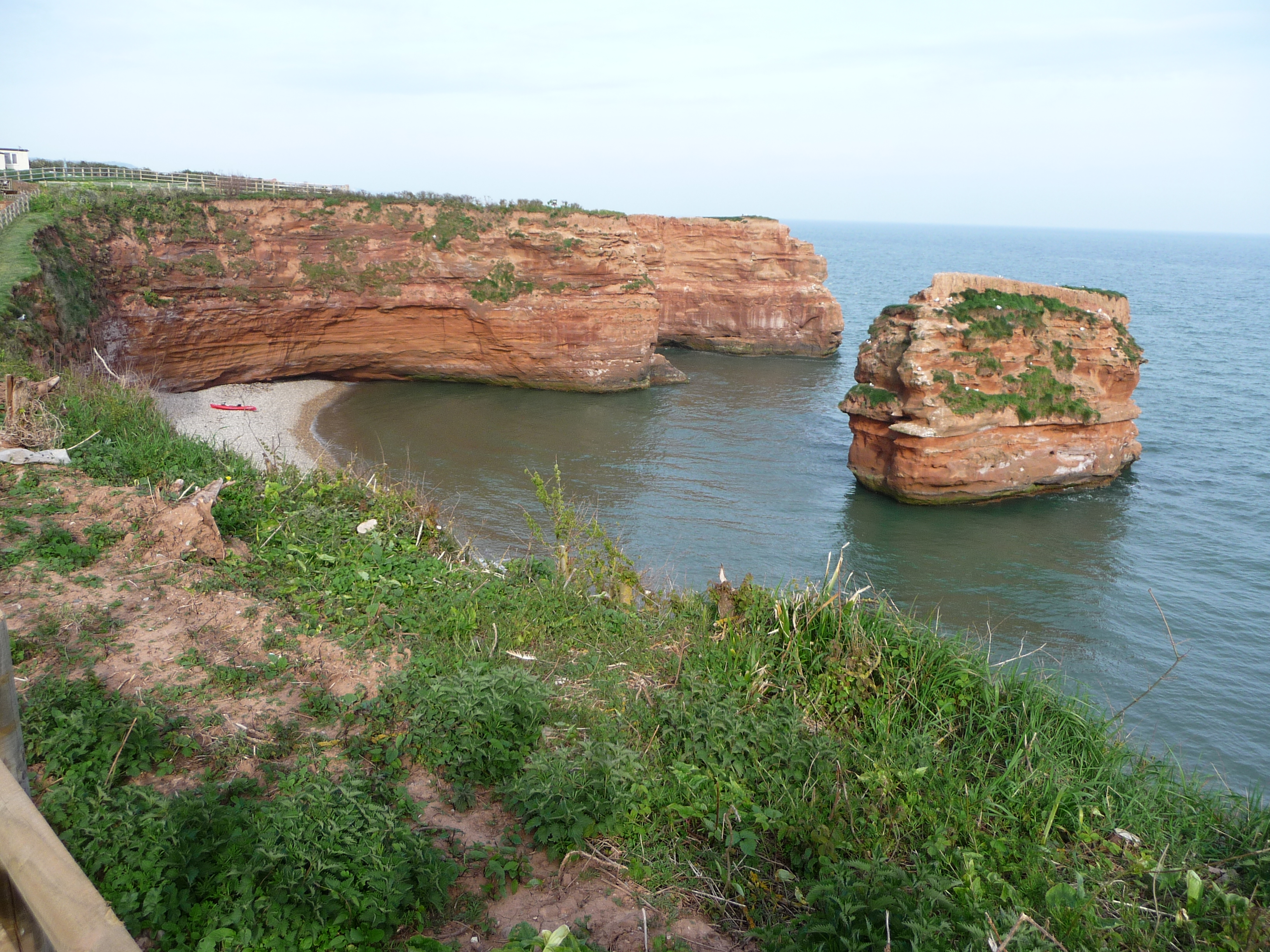
- Exposures of Helsby Sandstone Formation at Ladram Bay, Devon, England
- Type: Formation
- Unit of: Sherwood Sandstone Group (SSG)
- Overlies: Wilmslow Sandstone Formation (disconformity) or Chester Formation (unconformity)
- Thickness: Up to 500 m

Lithology
- Primary: sandstone
- Other: siltstone, mudstone, conglomerate

Location
- Region: England
- Country: United Kingdom

The Helsby Sandstone Formation, formerly known as the Otter Sandstone (in Devon and Somerset), is a geological formation in England. It was deposited during the Anisian stage of the Middle Triassic epoch. It primarily consists of medium to fine grained sandstone, both cross bedded and flat bedded, with minor lenticular beds of siltstone and mudstone and thin beds of conglomerate in some areas. It is found across England, from Devon on the southern coast to Cumbria in the north, with some exposures in Worcestershire and in Staffordshire in the Midlands. It was deposited in a hot, arid climate, when Britain formed part of the Pangean interior with the cross-bedded sandstones of the formation representing remnants of wind-blown sand dunes, while the majority of the formation was produced by the action of braided rivers, specifically the ‘Budleighensis’ river system, which flowed northwards from what is now northern France through southern and central England, before draining into what is now the Irish Sea. The environment of the formation likely also included ponds and small lakes, with surrounding vegetation including conifers (whose roots are preserved as concretions) and horsetails. Towards the top of the formation, the rocks indicate that the conditions became more arid, with the overlying formations showing the disappearance of rivers and the existence of playa-like conditions.

The formation in its southern coastal exposure in Devon in the vicinity of Sidmouth has provided important fossils of contemporary vertebrates, including temnospondyl amphibians, procolophonid, rhynchosaurian, sphenodontian and archosaurian reptiles, as well as fish.

== Paleobiota ==
Taken from unless otherwise noted:

=== Fish ===
Fish of the Helsby Sandstone
Genus	Species	Locality	Materials	Notes	Image
Dipteronotus	D. cyphus			A small 10–12 centimetres (3.9–4.7 in) long perleidiform fish, known from complete specimens, most common fish in the formation.	Fossil of the closely related species D. aculeatus
Actinopterygii	Indeterminate			Includes a fish known from a single mostly complete 10–12 centimetres (3.9–4.7 in) long undescribed specimen distinct from Dipteronotus, as well as the jaw of a pike-like fish, as well as other indeterminate microvertebrate remains.	
Elasmobranchii	Indeterminate			Freshwater shark known from a fin spine	

=== Amphibians ===
Amphibians of the Helsby Sandstone
Genus	Species	Locality	Materials	Notes	Image
Eocyclotosaurus				A capitosaurian temnospondyl	
Mastodonsaurus?				A capitosaurian temnospondyl, some authors have consider the remains indeterminate and not belonging to the genus	
Temnospondyli	Indeterminate			Includes a third taxon apparently distinct from Eocyclotosaurus and Mastodonsaurus, as well as indeterminate fragmentary material	

=== Reptiles ===
Reptiles of the Helsby Sandstone
Genus	Species	Locality	Materials	Notes	Image
Agriodontosaurus	A. helsbypetrae			A sphenodontian reptile known from a partial skeleton	
Bentonyx	B. sidensis			A rhynchosaurian reptile, known from a skull	
Coartaredens	C. isaaci			A reptile of uncertain classification, possibly a lepidosauromorph, but this is uncertain as it is only known from fragmentary remains	
Chirotherium				Ichnogenus of fossil trackways thought to be produced by "rauisuchians"	
Feralisaurus	F. corami			A small lepidosauromorph known from specimen BRSUG 29950-12, an articulated skeleton	
Fodonyx	F. spenceri			A rhynchosaurian reptile, known from postcranial and skull material	
Kapes	K. bentoni			A small lizard-like procolophonid reptile, known from a partial skeleton	
Archosauria	Indeterminate			Remains include vertebrae, teeth and a jaw fragment, which may represent poposauroids, with the jaw fragment suggested to possibly represent Bromsgroveia.	
Rhynchosauria	Indeterminate			Most common vertebrates in the formation, remains include a headless skeleton	
Procolophonidae	Indeterminate			Several indeterminate procolophonids distinct from Kapes, one of which has similarities to Sclerosaurus	
