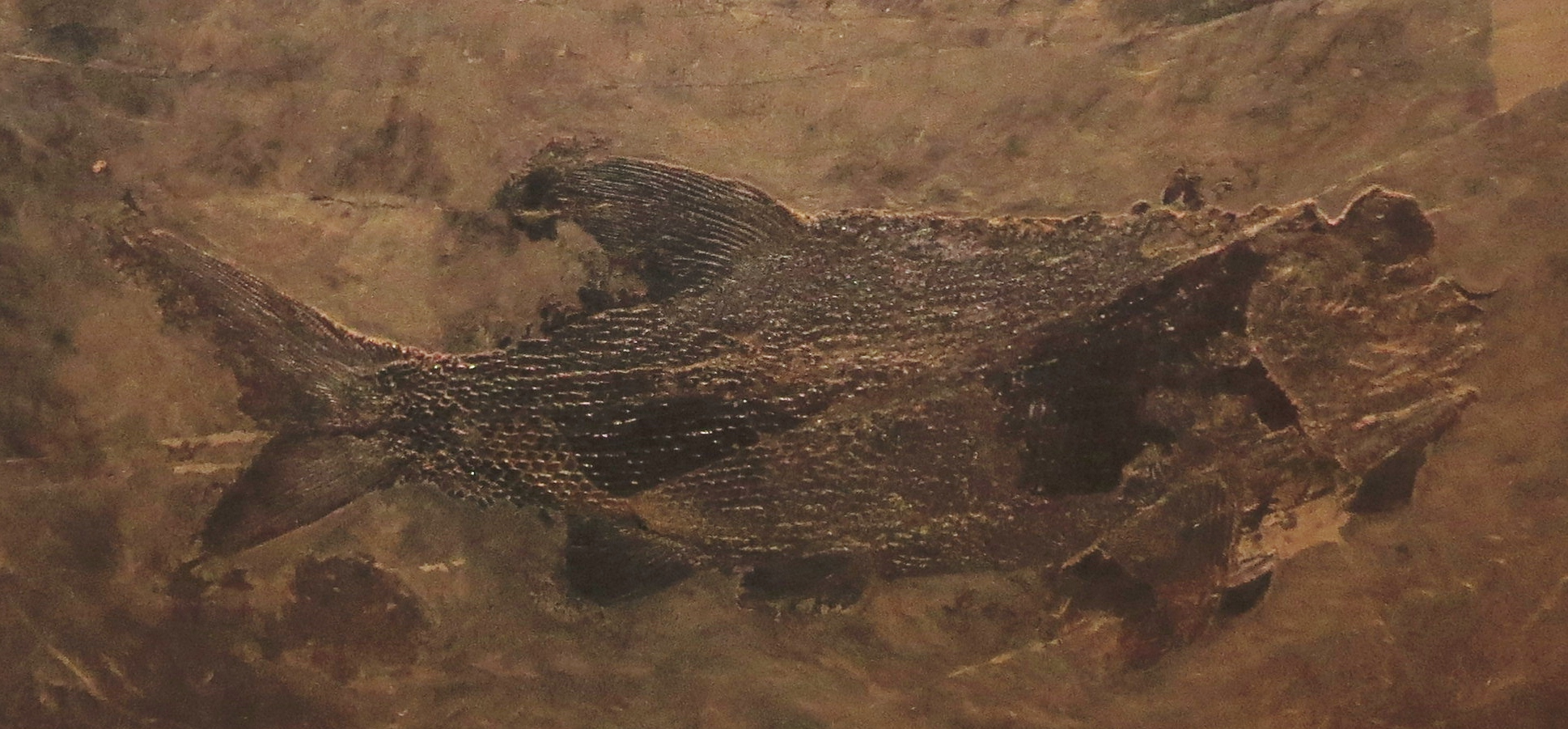
- Colobodus bassanii fossil at Paläontologisches Institut und Museum, Universität Zürich

Scientific classification
- Kingdom: Animalia
- Phylum: Chordata
- Class: Actinopterygii
- Order: †Colobodontiformes
- Family: †Colobodontidae
- Genus: †Colobodus; Agassiz, 1844

Type species
- †Colobodus bassanii de Alessandri, 1910

Other species
- See text

= Colobodus =

Colobodus Temporal range: Olenekian–Carnian

Extinct genus of fishes

Colobodus is an extinct genus of marine Triassic ray-finned fish of the family Colobodontidae and order Perleidiformes. Fossils have been found in Europe (France, Germany, Italy, Spain, Switzerland) and China, encompassing the former Tethys Ocean. It could reach body lengths of about 70 cm (2 ft 4 in).

The original type species was Colobodus hogardi Agassiz, 1844, the fossils of which are probably destroyed, therefore the new type species C. bassanii was designated.

== Taxonomy ==
The following species are known:

- †C. bassanii de Alessandri, 1910 - Late Anisian of Italy & Switzerland (Besano Formation)
- †C. maximus (Quenstedt, 1867) - Anisian of Italy (Besano Formation), Anisian to Carnian of Germany (Muschelkalk)
- †C. praemaximus Corroy, 1928 - Early Triassic of France
- †C. koenigi Stolley, 1920 - Late Anisian of Germany (Muschelkalk) (possibly synonymous with C. bassanii)
- †C. baii Sun et al., 2008 - Anisian of Guizhou, China
- †C. giganteus (Beltan, 1972) - Late Ladinian of Spain (Muschelkalk)
- †C. wushaensis Li et al., 2019 - Carnian of Guizhou, China

Several other species (C. stensioei, C. dealessandrii, C. stolleyi, C. cyclolepis, and C. anguillalepis) were proposed by Mutter (2002) from a single fossiliferous level from the Besano Formation, although their validity is uncertain due to the extreme morphological variety within the group.

Records of Colobodus exist outside of Europe and China, but these remains are thought to be highly questionable.

=== Synonyms ===
- Colobodus altilepis Woodward, 1912 → Perleidus woodwardi (Woodward, 1912)
- Colobodus scutatus Gervais, 1852 → Bobasatrania scutata (Gervais, 1852)

== Fossil gallery ==
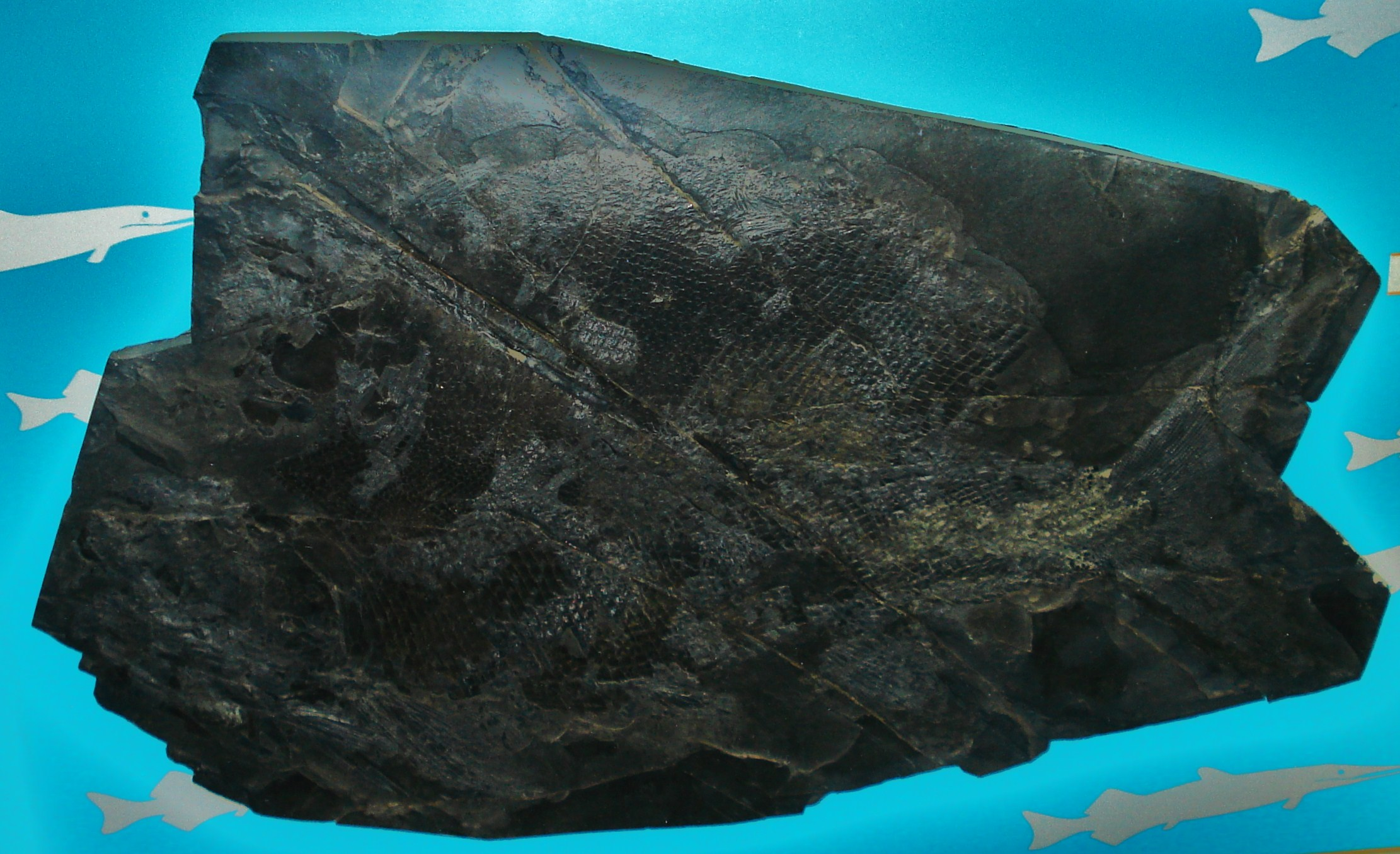
Colobodus bassanii fossil

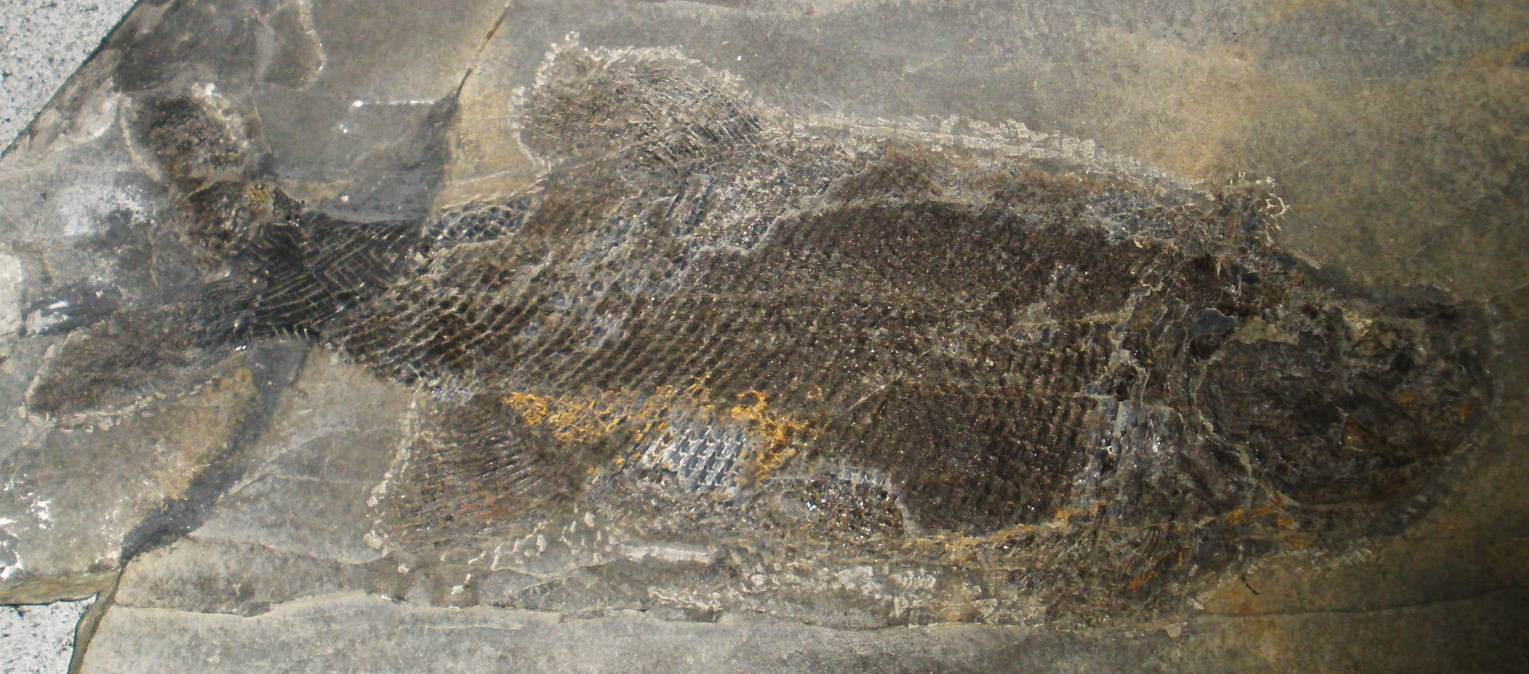
Fossil at Museo dei Fossili, Besano

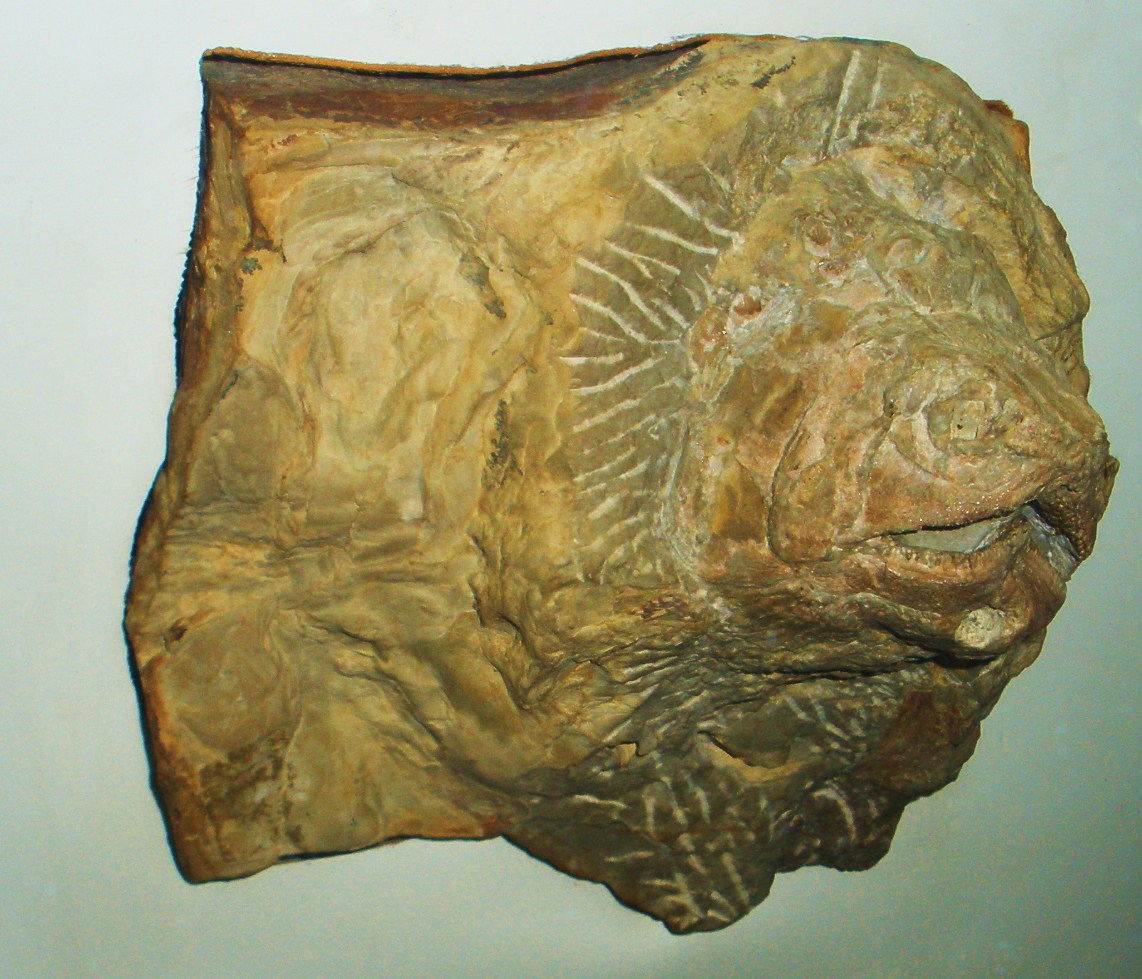
Three-dimensionally preserved head of Colobodus maximus

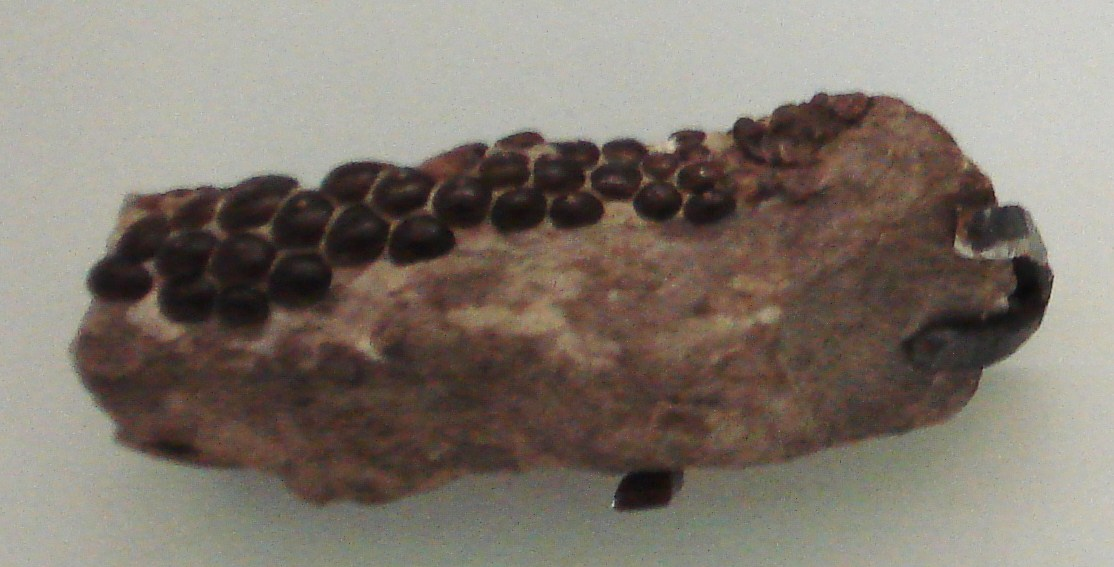
Lower jaw and dentition of Colobodus maximus

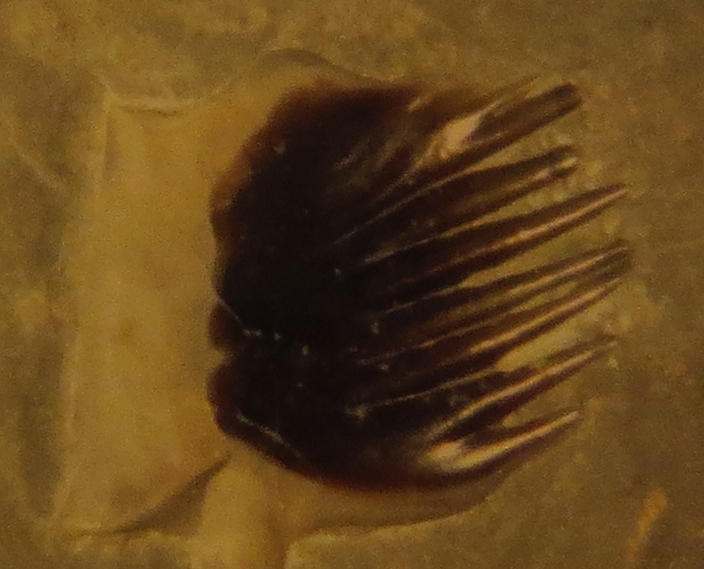
Isolated scale

== See also ==
- Prehistoric fish
- List of prehistoric bony fish
