= Feralisaurus =

Feralisaurus Temporal range: Middle Triassic, Anisian

Scientific classification
- Kingdom: Animalia
- Phylum: Chordata
- Class: Reptilia
- Clade: Lepidosauromorpha (?)
- Genus: †Feralisaurus; Cavicchini et al., 2020
- Species: †F. corami

Binomial name
- †Feralisaurus corami Cavicchini et al., 2020

Extinct genus of reptiles

Feralisaurus is an extinct genus of neodiapsid reptile, possibly a basal lepidosauromorph, known from the Middle Triassic of south-western England. It contains one species, Feralisaurus corami, which was described by Cavicchini et al. in 2020. It was found in the Helsby Sandstone Formation.

== Discovery ==
The holotype and only known specimen of Feralisaurus, BRSUG 29950-12, was discovered in 2014 near Sidmouth, Devon.

== Classification ==
Feralisaurus was recovered as either a basal neodiapsid or as a basal lepidosauromorph, with the researchers preferring a placement within Lepidosauromorpha.
