= Cephaloxenus =

Cephaloxenus Temporal range: Early Ladinian

Scientific classification
- Kingdom: Animalia
- Phylum: Chordata
- Class: Actinopterygii
- Order: †Perleidiformes (?)
- Family: †Cephaloxenidae; Brough, 1939
- Genus: †Cephaloxenus; Brough, 1939

Species
- †C. macropterus Brough, 1939; †C. squamiserratus Bürgin, 1992

Extinct genus of fishes

Cephaloxenus is an extinct genus of prehistoric marine ray-finned fish that lived during the early Ladinian stage of the Middle Triassic epoch.

It contains two species:

- †C. macropterus Brough, 1939 - Ladinian of Italy and Switzerland
- †C. squamiserratus Bürgin, 1992 - Ladinian of Italy

It was often classified as a peltopleurid, but has more recently been classified as a perleidiform in its own monotypic family, Cephaloxenidae.

== See also ==
- Prehistoric fish
- List of prehistoric bony fish
