= Coartaredens =

Coartaredens isaaci Temporal range: Middle Triassic, Anisian

Scientific classification
- Kingdom: Animalia
- Phylum: Chordata
- Class: Reptilia
- Genus: †Coartaredens; Spencer & Storrs, 2002
- Species: †C. isaaci

Binomial name
- †Coartaredens isaaci Spencer & Storrs, 2002

Extinct genus of reptiles

Coartaredens is an extinct genus of reptile from the Middle Triassic of England. It contains a single species, Coartaredens isaaci, from the Anisian-age Otter Sandstone of Devon. The species is based on a partial jaw and other fragments with large conical teeth. Though originally described as a lepidosauromorph, some authors have instead considered it to be a procolophonid.
