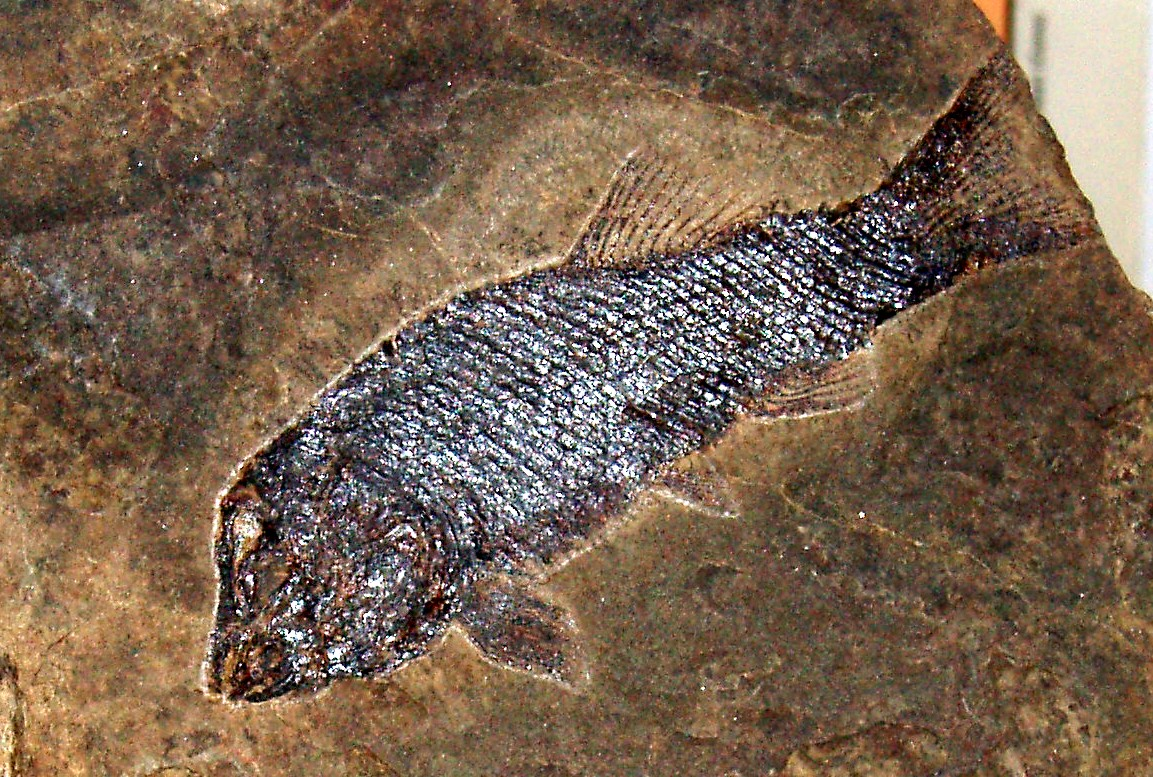
- Fossil Aetheodontus besanensis

Scientific classification
- Kingdom: Animalia
- Phylum: Chordata
- Class: Actinopterygii
- Order: †Perleidiformes
- Family: †Perleididae
- Genus: †Aetheodontus; Brough, 1939
- Species: †A. besanensis

Binomial name
- †Aetheodontus besanensis Brough, 1939

= Aetheodontus =

Aetheodontus Temporal range: Early Ladinian

Extinct genus of fishes

Aetheodontus is an extinct genus of prehistoric marine bony fish that lived during the early Ladinian stage of the Middle Triassic epoch of what is now Italy and Switzerland. It contains a single species, A. besanensis.

== See also ==
- Prehistoric fish
- List of prehistoric bony fish
