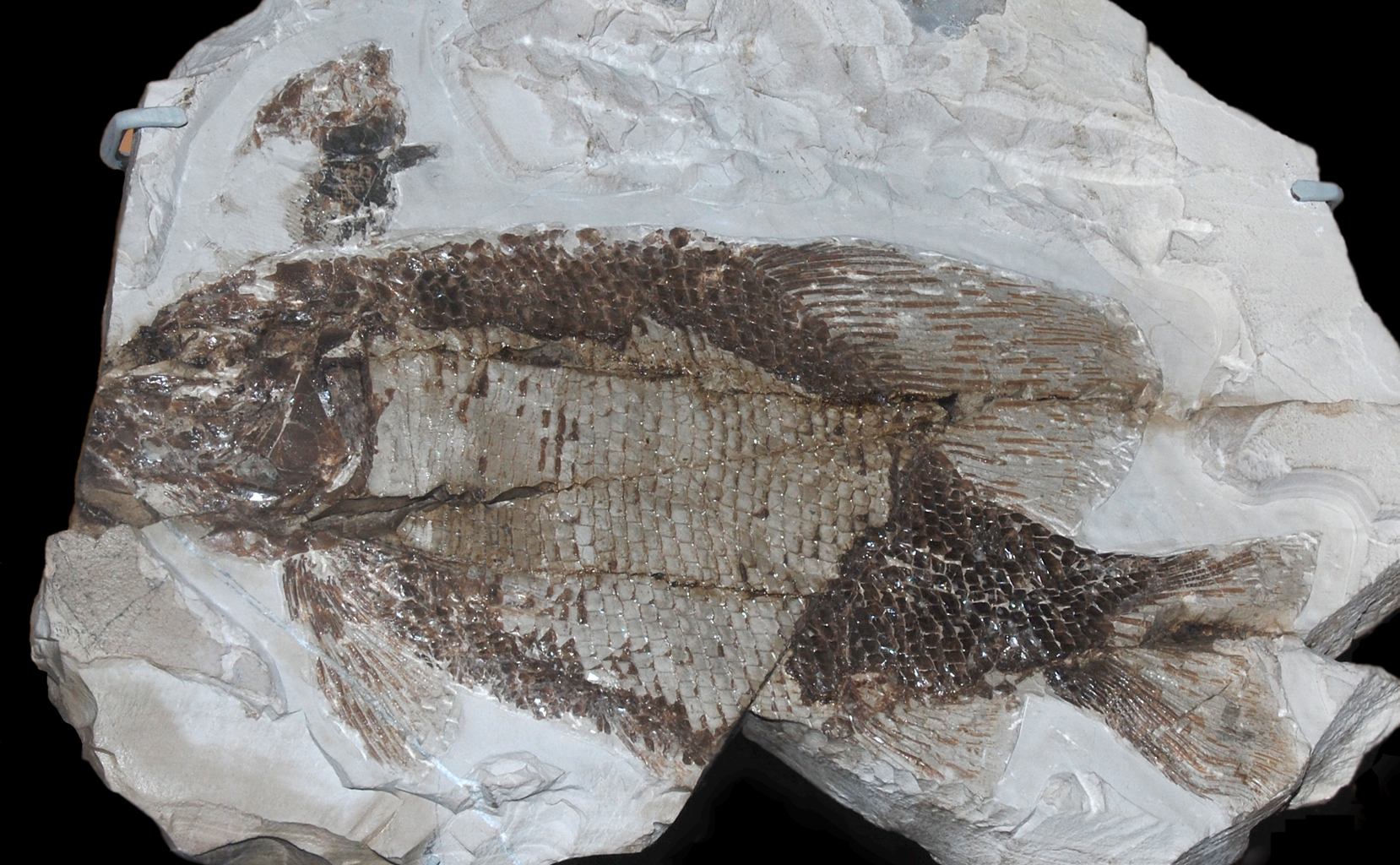
- Fossil specimen of Colobodus

Scientific classification
- Kingdom: Animalia
- Phylum: Chordata
- Class: Actinopterygii
- Subclass: Neopterygii
- Order: †Colobodontiformes; Xu et al., 2024
- Family: †Colobodontidae; Andersson, 1916

Genera
- See text

= Colobodontidae =

Colobodontidae Temporal range: Anisian–Norian Possible Olenekian record

Extinct family of ray-finned fishes

Colobodontidae is an extinct family of marine stem-neopterygian fish known from the Triassic of Asia and Europe. It contains at least three genera: Colobodus, Crenilepis and Feroxichthys; the genera Chaohuperleidus and Gabanellia may also belong to the family. The colobodontids typically were medium-sized, somewhat deep-bodied fishes with a durophagous diet. Like most other stem-neopterygian families, it was traditionally placed in the paraphyletic order Perleidiformes, but in 2024 it was moved to the new, monotypic order Colobodontiformes.

== Classification ==
The cladogram below follows Yuan et al. (2022) and shows the relationships between Colobodontidae and other neopterygian clades:

- Neopterygii (Total group)
  - - Australosomus kochi
    - Redfieldiiformes
  - - Platysiagiformes
    - - Polzbergiiformes
      - - Colobodontidae
          - Chaohuperleidus primus
          - - Gabanellia agilis
            - - - Feroxichthys panzhouensis
                - Feroxichthys yunnanensis
              - - Colobodus baii
                - Crenilepis sandbergeri
                - - Colobodus bassanii
                  - Colobodus giganteus
        - - Perleididae
          - - Louwoichthyiformes
            - - Luganoiiformes
              - - Peltopleuriformes
                - - Venusichthys comptus
                  - - Habroichthys minimus
                    - Crown-Neopterygii
                      - Holostei
                      - Teleostei
