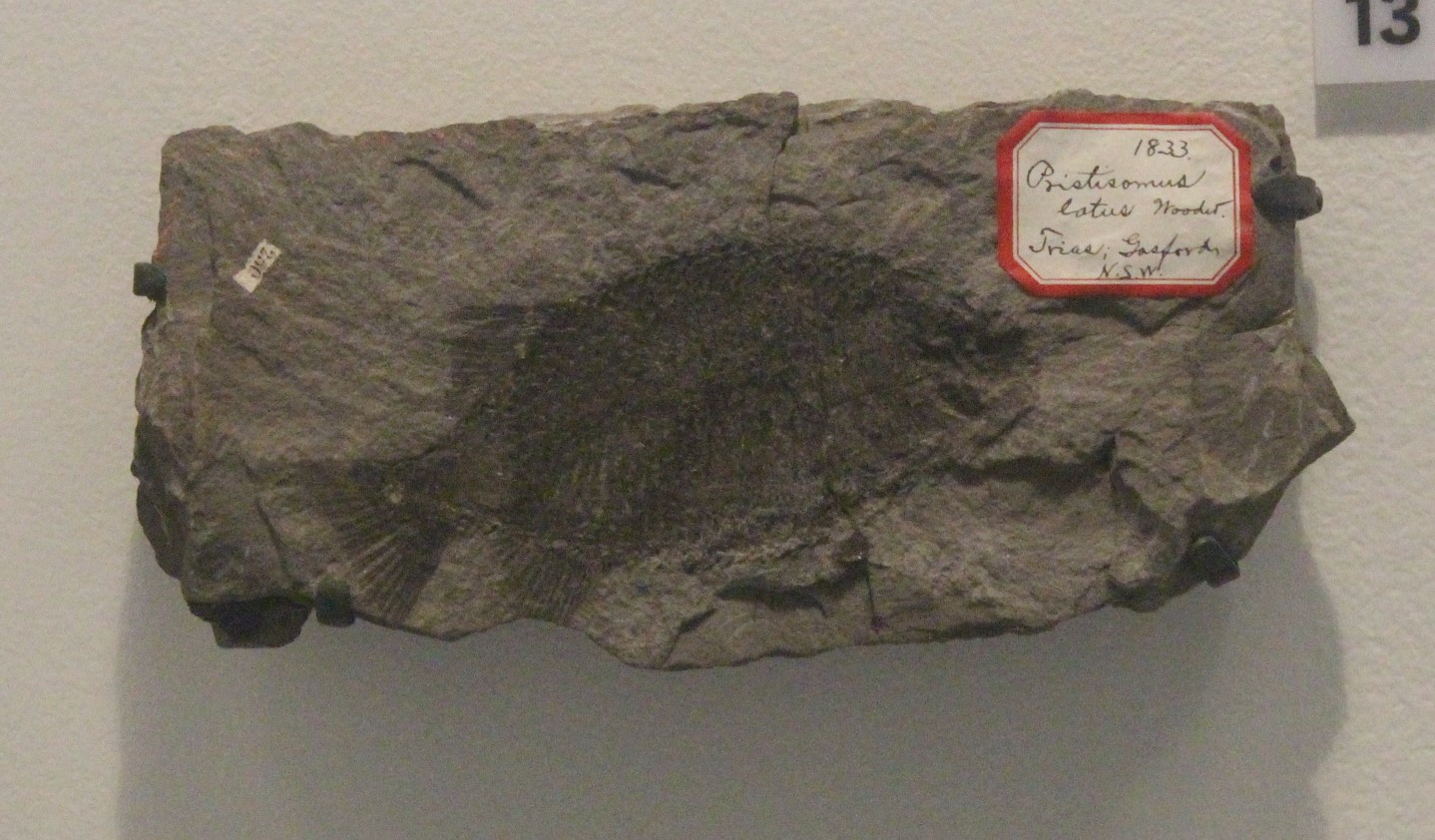
- P. latus fossil, National Museum of Natural History

Scientific classification
- Kingdom: Animalia
- Phylum: Chordata
- Class: Actinopterygii
- Infraclass: Holostei
- Genus: †Pristisomus; Woodward, 1890

Type species
- †Pristisomus gracilis Woodward, 1890

Other species
- †P. latus Woodward, 1890; †P. crassus Woodward, 1890

= Pristisomus =

Pristisomus Temporal range: Anisian

Extinct genus of fishes

Pristisomus is an extinct genus of prehistoric bony fish that lived during the Anisian age (Middle Triassic epoch) in what is now New South Wales, Australia. Fossils are derived from the Terrigal Formation.

== Etymology ==
Pristisomus comes from the Latin 'pristis' meaning 'sea monster' or 'shark' and the Greek 'soma' meaning 'body'.

== Synonymy ==
- Pristisomus merlei Priem, 1924 → Australosomus merlei (Priem, 1924)

== See also ==
- Prehistoric fish
- List of prehistoric bony fish
