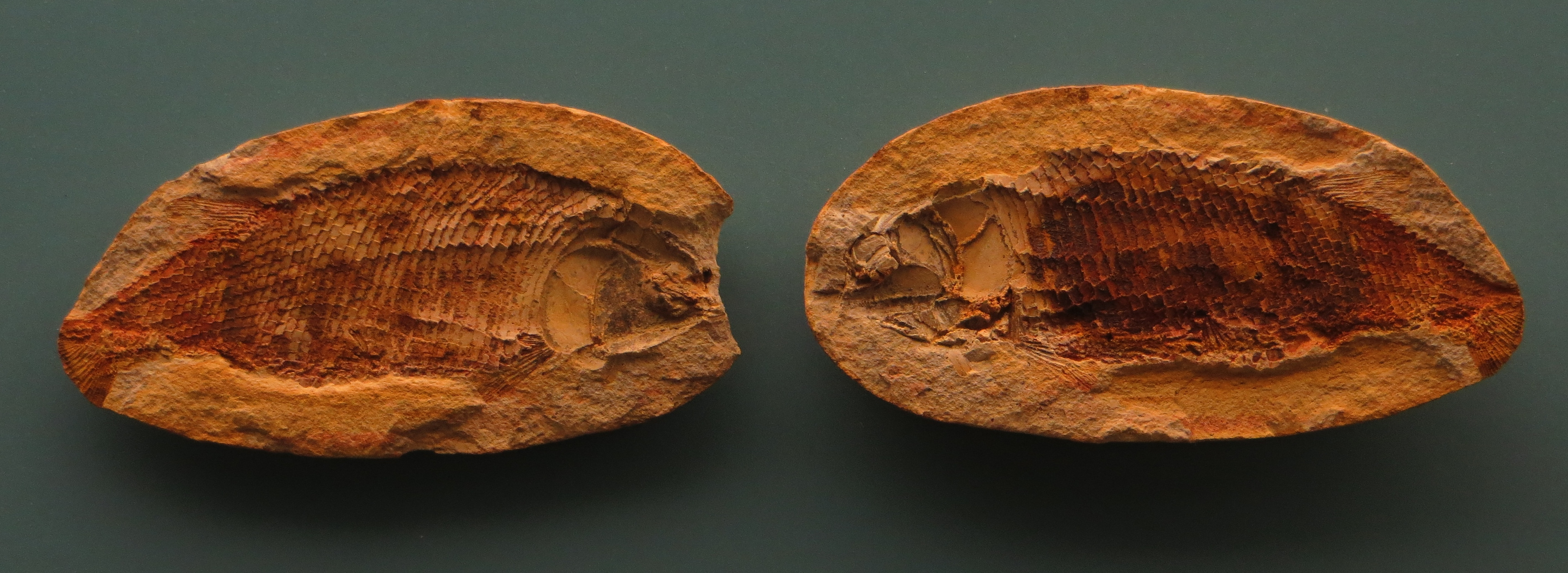
- Fossil of T. madagascariensis
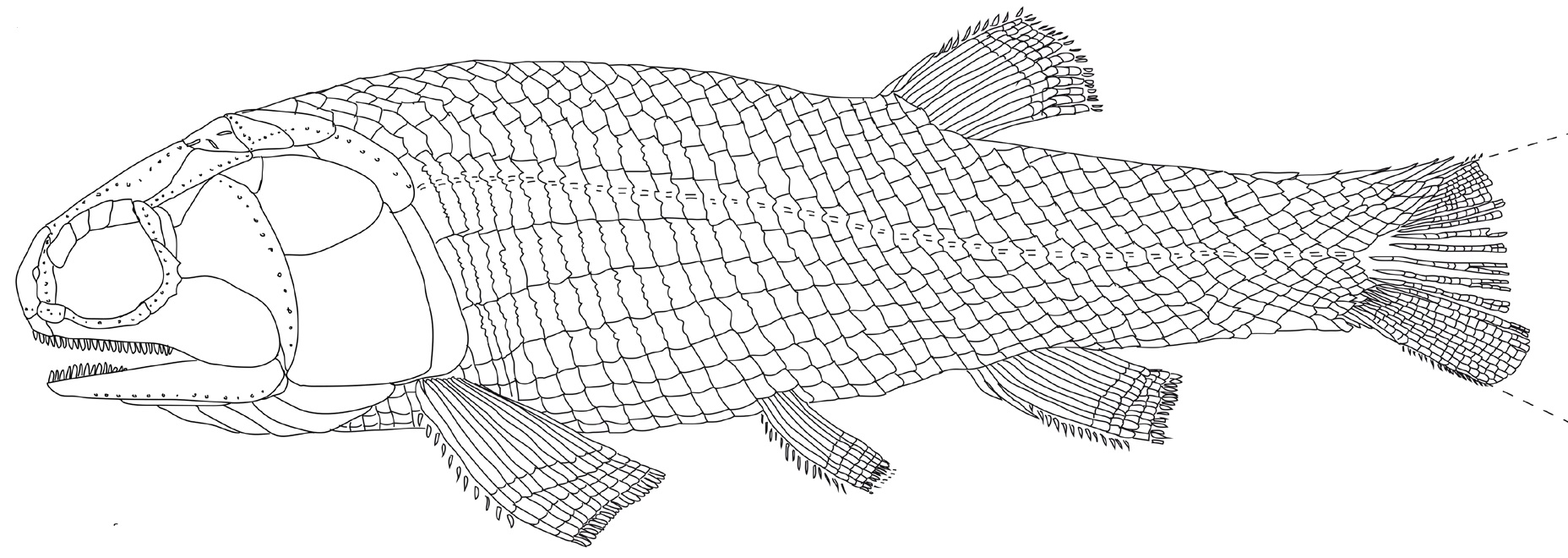
- Restoration of Teffichthys

Scientific classification
- Kingdom: Animalia
- Phylum: Chordata
- Class: Actinopterygii
- Subclass: Neopterygii
- Genus: †Teffichthys; Marramà et al., 2017

Type species
- †Perleidus madagascariensis Piveteau, 1934

Other species
- †T. elegans Yuan et al., 2022

= Teffichthys =

Teffichthys Temporal range: Early Triassic

Extinct genus of ray-finned fishes

Teffichthys is an extinct genus of ray-finned fish from the Early Triassic epoch. Fossils have been found in Madagascar and China, and possibly also in Angola, Canada, Greenland, and Svalbard.

== Classification ==
The type species of Teffichthys is Perleidus madagascariensis from the Induan of Madagascar. Perleidus is a Middle Triassic genus; Early Triassic species were referred to this genus based on superficial similarities. In 2017, the genus Teffichthys was erected for "Perleidus" madagascariensis, and the second species from Madagascar ("Perleidus" piveteaui) was synonymized with Teffichthys madagascariensis. Other Early Triassic species currently ascribed to Perleidus might be referrable to Teffichthys, too. Another species, T. elegans, was described from the Early Triassic Guiyang biota of South China.

A phylogenetic analysis placed Teffichthys as a stem-neopterygian closely related to Meidiichthys and Plesiofuro.
