= Meidiichthys =

Meidiichthys Temporal range: Early Triassic

Scientific classification
- Kingdom: Animalia
- Phylum: Chordata
- Class: Actinopterygii
- Order: †Perleidiformes
- Genus: †Meidiichthys; Brough, 1931

Extinct genus of fishes

Meidiichthys is an extinct genus of prehistoric bony fish that lived during the Early Triassic epoch.

== See also ==
- Prehistoric fish
- List of prehistoric bony fish
