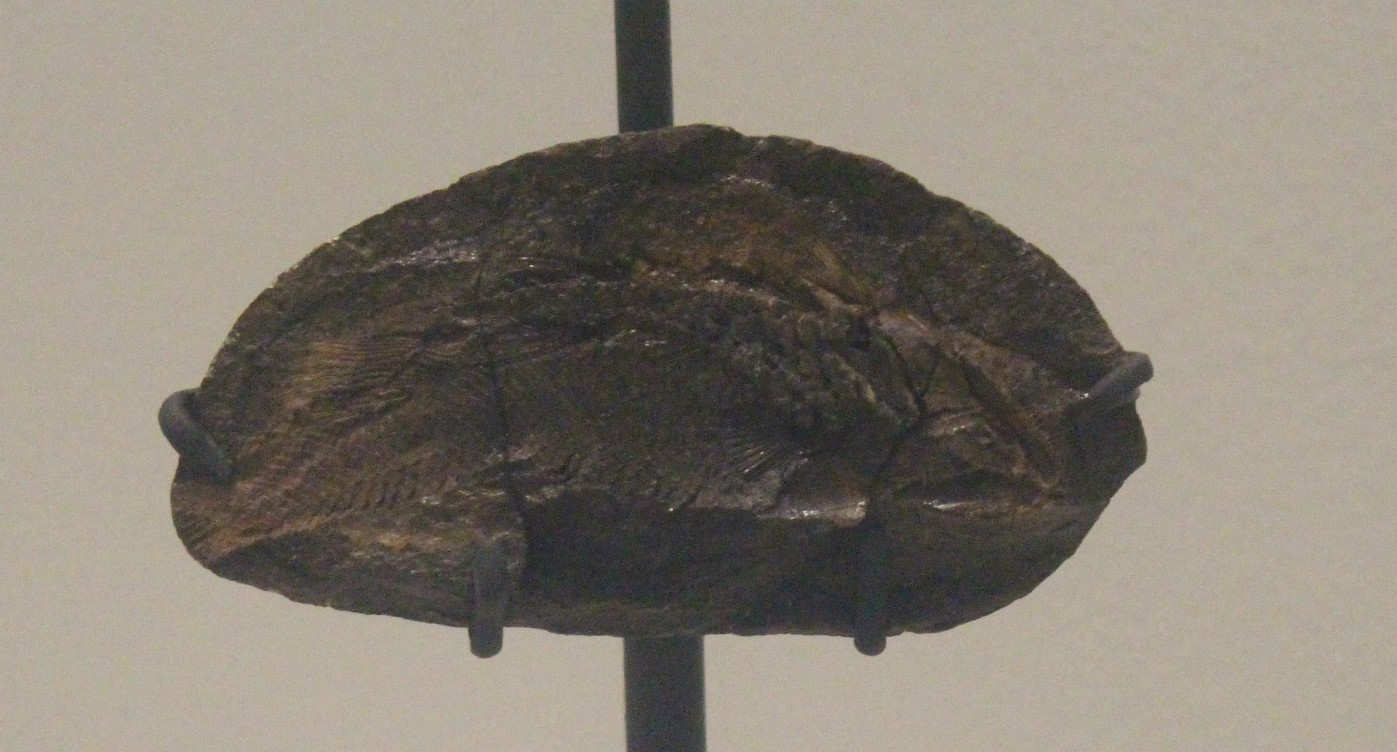
- P. piveteaui fossil, National Museum of Natural History

Scientific classification
- Domain: Eukaryota
- Kingdom: Animalia
- Phylum: Chordata
- Class: Actinopterygii
- Order: †Perleidiformes
- Genus: †Plesioperleidus; Su and Li, 1983

= Plesioperleidus =

Plesioperleidus Temporal range: Early Triassic

Extinct genus of fishes

Plesioperleidus is an extinct genus of prehistoric bony fish that lived during the Early Triassic epoch.

== See also ==
- Prehistoric fish
- List of prehistoric bony fish
