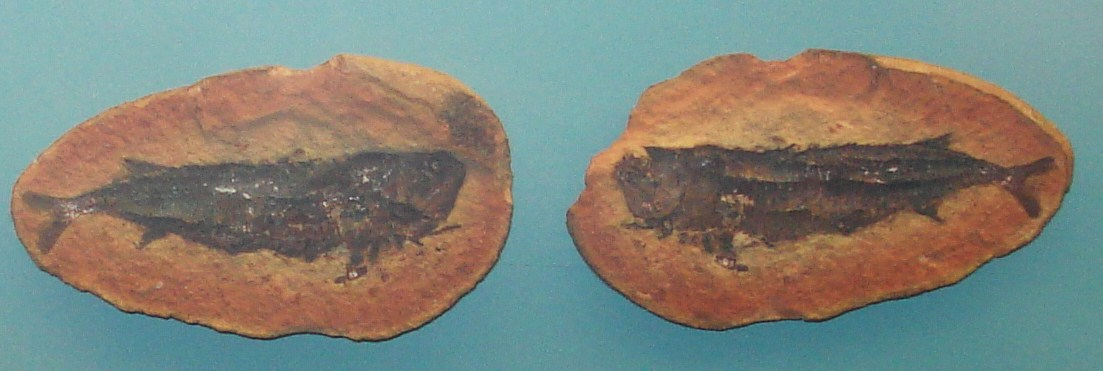

Scientific classification
- Kingdom: Animalia
- Phylum: Chordata
- Class: Actinopterygii
- Order: †Pholidopleuriformes
- Family: †Pholidopleuridae
- Genus: †Australosomus; Pivetau, 1930

Type species
- †Pristisomus merlei Priem, 1924

Species
- See text

= Australosomus =

Australosomus Temporal range: Early Triassic

Extinct genus of fishes

Australosomus (meaning "southern body") is an extinct genus of prehistoric ray-finned fish that lived during the Early Triassic epoch in what is now Greenland, Kenya, Tanzania, Madagascar, South Africa and Canada (British Columbia).

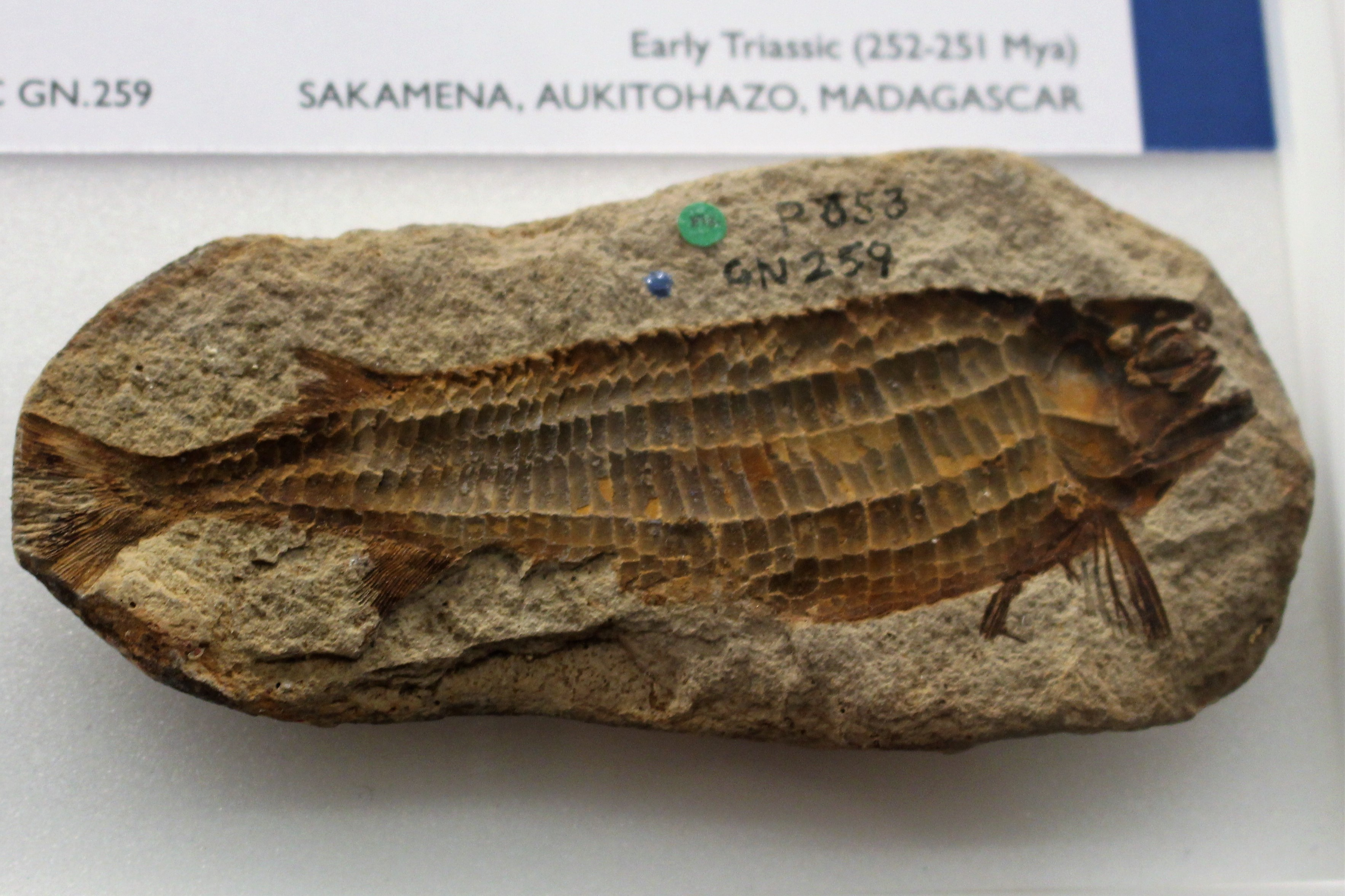
Australosomus merlei fossil

The type species, Australosomus merlei from Madagascar, was first described as Pristisomus merlei by Ferdinand Priem. A new genus, Australosomus, was later erected for this species by Jean Piveteau.

Australosomus is one of many genera to arise after the Permian-Triassic extinction event, only to die out during the Early Triassic, possibly during a subsequent extinction event.

Most species were marine, except for the African species, which were found in freshwater deposits.

The genus name Australosomus ("southern body") is inaccurate, as Australosomus is known as far north as Canada and Greenland, although the first known remains were described from Madagascar.

== Taxonomy ==
Australosomus contains the following species:

- †A. altisquamosus Beltan, 1980 - Late Induan of Madagascar (Sakamena Group)
- †A. kochi Stensiö, 1932 - Early Induan (and possibly latest Permian) of Greenland (Wordie Creek Formation) (=A. simplex Nielsen, 1949)
- †A. longirostris Beltan 1968 - Late Induan of Madagascar (Sakamena Group)
- † A. merlei (Priem, 1924) - Late Induan of Madagascar (Sakamena Group)
- †A. pholidopleuroides Nielsen, 1949 - Early Induan of Greenland (Wordie Creek Formation)
- †A. stockleyi Haughton, 1936 - Induan of Tanzania (Karoo Supergroup)

Indeterminate remains are known from the Sulphur Mountain Formation of British Columbia and Alberta (Canada). The remains of a potentially associated genus are known from the Late Triassic Chinle Formation of Arizona. Potential remains are known from the Permian-Triassic boundary of Kenya.

== Appearance ==
Australosomus was an elongate fish. The interlocking scales (3 to 4 times long as wide), deeply forked caudal fin all help to distinguish this genus. It achieved standard lengths of about 100 mm (3.9 in) to 310 mm (12 in).

== See also ==
- Prehistoric fish
- List of prehistoric bony fish
