= Crenilepis =

Crenilepis Temporal range: Anisian

Scientific classification
- Kingdom: Animalia
- Phylum: Chordata
- Class: Actinopterygii
- Order: †Colobodontiformes
- Family: †Colobodontidae
- Genus: †Crenilepis; Dames, 1888
- Species: †C. sandbergeri

Binomial name
- †Crenilepis sandbergeri Dames, 1888

Synonyms
- †Crenolepis Carus, 1888; †Crenilepoides Strand, 1929

Extinct genus of fishes

Crenilepis is an extinct genus of prehistoric marine ray-finned fish that lived in the seas of present-day Europe during the Middle Triassic epoch. It contains a single species, C. sandbergi from the Anisian of Germany, Spain, and the Besano Formation of the Swiss-Italian border.

== Taxonomy ==
Crenilepis was named by German paleontologist Wilhelm Dames in 1888 for a fragment of scales (SNSB-BSPG 2008 LXI 5) from the Middle Triassic (Ladinian) Lower Keuper of Würzburg, Bavaria, southern Germany. The genus name was misspelt as "Crenolepis" by Carus (1888), and some authors (Romer 1966; Gardiner 1967; Carroll 1988; Sepkoski 2002) erroneously believed that Carus's misspelling was a replacement name for Crenilepis. However, Moser (2013) pointed out "Crenolepis" is a misspelling of Crenilepis because Carus (1888) cited Dames' 1888 work and just noted the genus as new. Strand (1929) claimed that Dames' genus was a junior homonym of "Crenilepis Reis, Sitz.-Ber. Akad. Wiss. München 1887, fasc. 1. p. 40, t. 5, f. 3 (1887)" and coined Crenilepoides as a replacement name. However, Moser (2013) showed that this citation was in error, as no known works by Otto Maria Reis dealt with Crenilepis and the Sitzungsberichte der Bayerischen Akademie der Wissenschaften 1887 contained no works by Reis at all, rendering Crenilepis technically valid and Crenilepoides an unnecessary replacement name.

The type species of Crenilepis is C. sandbergeri, Sun et al. (2008) considered the type specimen of C. sandbergeri lost and also undiagnostic, but Moser (2013) noted that the holotype is now in the collections of the Bayerische Staatssammlung für Paläontologie und Geologie in Munich. Other species have also been assigned to this genus, including C. divaricatus Mutter, 2002 and C. bassanii de Alessandri, 1910, but this is disputed.

== See also ==
- Prehistoric fish
- List of prehistoric bony fish
