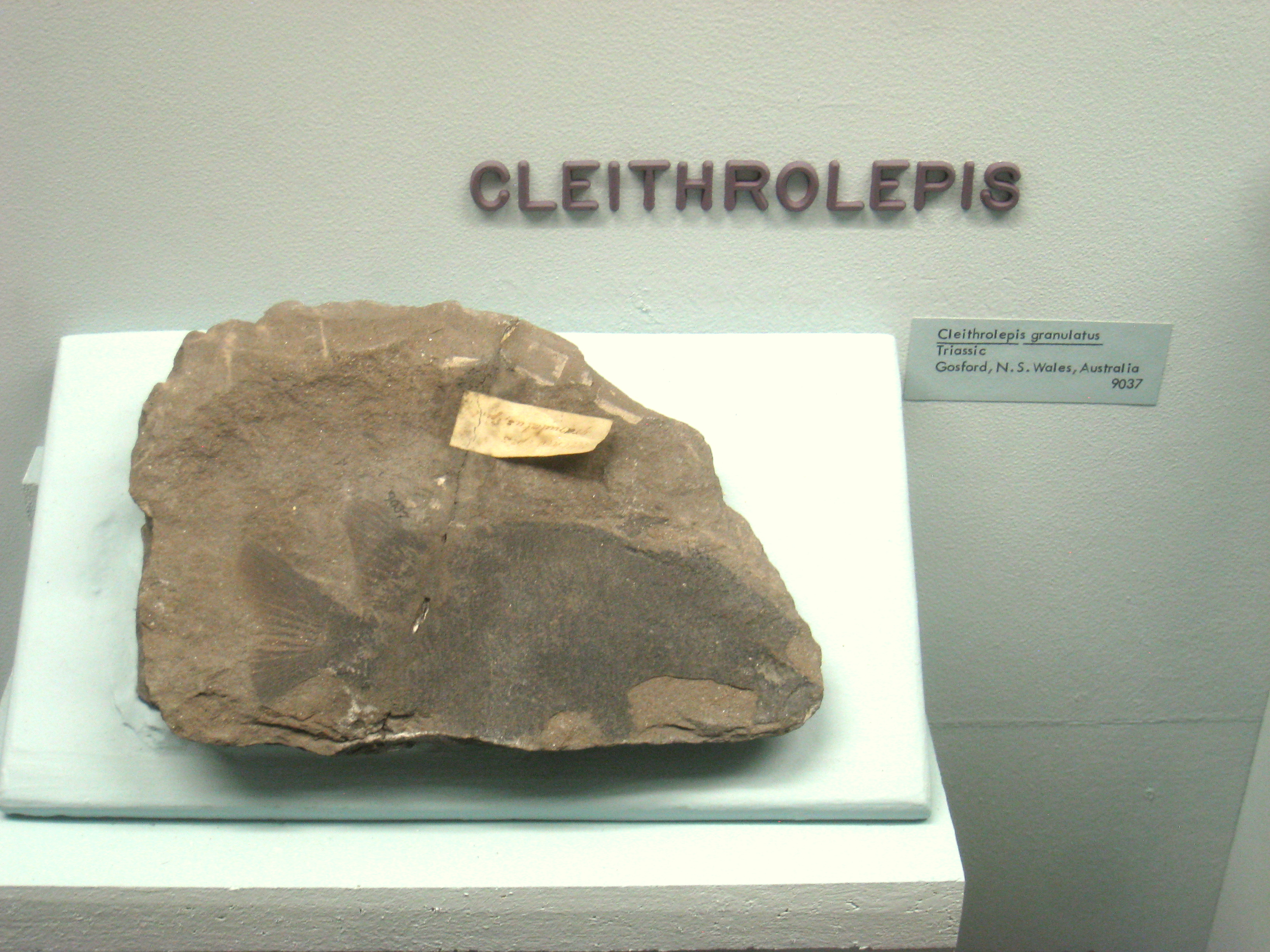

Scientific classification
- Kingdom: Animalia
- Phylum: Chordata
- Class: Actinopterygii
- Order: †Polzbergiiformes
- Family: †Cleithrolepididae
- Genus: †Cleithrolepis; Egerton, 1864

Type species
- †Cleithrolepis granulatus Egerton, 1864

Species
- †C. altus Woodward, 1890; †C. granulatus Egerton, 1864; †C. major Gardiner, 1988; ?†C. brueckneri Oertle, 1931

= Cleithrolepis =

Cleithrolepis Temporal range: Early to Middle Triassic

Extinct genus of fishes

Cleithrolepis is an extinct genus of freshwater ray-finned fish that lived from the Induan age (Early Triassic epoch) to the Anisian (Middle Triassic) in what is now Australia (New South Wales, Tasmania) and Libya. A species from Late Triassic Germany, C. brueckneri, was also ascribed to Cleithrolepis.

== Taxonomy ==
The following species are known:

- †C. altus Woodward, 1890 - Olenekian (Early Triassic) or Anisian (Middle Triassic) of New South Wales, Australia (Sydney Sandstone & Terrigal Formation)
- †C. granulatus Egerton, 1864 - Induan (Early Triassic) of Tasmania, Australia (Knocklofty Formation) to Anisian of New South Wales, Australia (Sydney Sandstone & Terrigal Formation)
- †C. major Gardiner, 1988 - Anisian of Cyrenaica, Libya (Alma Formation)

Dubious remains are known from the Ladinian of Spain. The dubious species "C." brueckneri Oertle, 1931 from the Carnian of Germany was previously assigned to this genus, although its actual taxonomic status remains uncertain. The former species C. extoni Woodward, 1888 from South Africa has been reclassified into the related genus Cleithrolepidina, while the former species C. cuyana from Argentina has been reclassified into Pseudobeaconia in the Louwoichthyiformes.

It was formerly placed in the order Perleidiformes, but recent taxonomic revisions have found that order to be non-monophyletic, and it is now placed in the order Polzbergiiformes.

== Appearance ==
The genus grew to about 30 centimetres (12 in) long. It had a weak lower jaw with teeth only at the tip.

== Occurrence ==
Cleithrolepis lived in rivers, billabongs and lakes in the large braided river system that deposited the Hawkesbury Sandstone in what is now New South Wales, with fossils found in shale lenses within the sandstone. Fossils were also found in Tasmania (Knocklofty Formation) and in a drill core sample from Libya, 10,840 feet (3,300 m) below the surface.
