= Platysiagum =

Platysiagum Temporal range: Early Anisian–Early Jurassic

Scientific classification
- Kingdom: Animalia
- Phylum: Chordata
- Class: Actinopterygii
- Order: †Platysiagiformes
- Family: †Platysiagidae
- Genus: †Platysiagum; Egerton, 1872

Type species
- †Platysiagum sclerocephalum Egerton, 1872

Other species
- †P. minus Brough, 1939; †P. sinensis Wen et al., 2019

Extinct genus of fishes

Platysiagum is an extinct genus of prehistoric bony fish belonging to the family Platysiagidae. Fossils are known from the Middle Triassic of China, Italy and Switzerland, and the Early Jurassic of England.

== See also ==
- Prehistoric fish
- List of prehistoric bony fish
