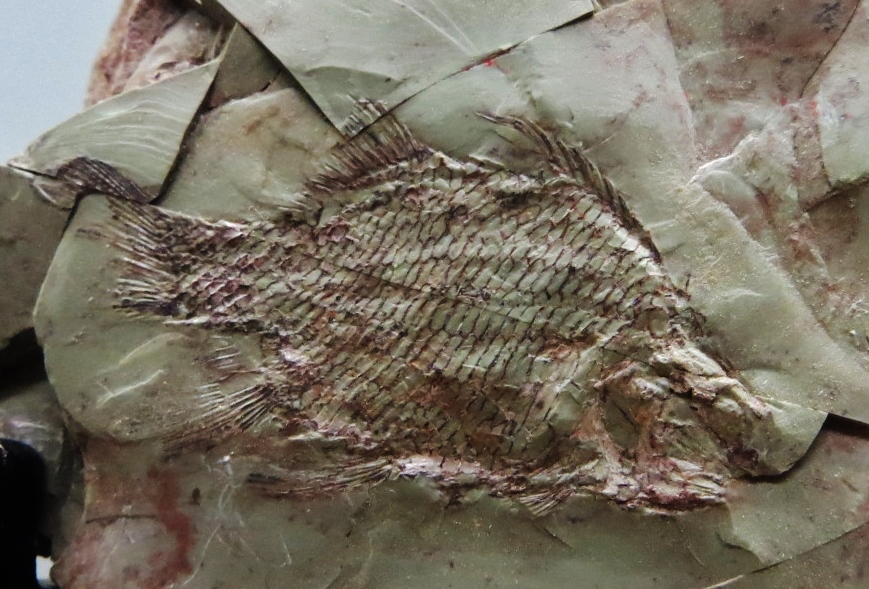
- Dipteronotus aculeatus fossil

Scientific classification
- Kingdom: Animalia
- Phylum: Chordata
- Class: Actinopterygii
- Order: †Perleidiformes
- Genus: †Dipteronotus; Egerton, 1854

Type species
- †Dipteronotus cyphus Egerton, 1854

Other species
- †D. aculeatus (Jörg, 1969); †D. gibbosus Martin, 1980; †D. olgiatii Tintori, 1990

Synonyms
- Praesemionotus Jörg, 1969

= Dipteronotus =

Dipteronotus Temporal range: Anisian-Carnian

Extinct genus of fishes

Dipteronotus is an extinct genus of marine stem-neopterygian ray-finned fish that existed during the Middle and Late Triassic epochs in what is now Europe (France, Germany, Italy, England) and Morocco. As a typical feature, it had several ridge scales in front of its dorsal fin that created a spine-like structure.

== Taxonomy ==
The following species are known:

- D. aculeatus (Jörg, 1969) - Early Anisian of France
- D. gibbosus Martin, 1980 - Carnian of Morocco (Timezgadiouine Formation)
- D. cyphus Egerton, 1854 - Late Anisian of England (Otter Sandstone Formation)
- D. olgiatii Tintori, 1990 - Late Ladinian of Italy (Meride Formation, Monte San Giorgio)

The species D. ornatus Bürgin 1992 from the Besano Formation of Switzerland has been reassigned to the polzbergiid genus Stoppania.

=== Synonymy ===
†Dipteronotus ornatus Bürgin, 1992 → †Stoppania ornata (Bürgin, 1992)

== See also ==
- Prehistoric fish
- List of prehistoric bony fish
