= Platysiagidae =

Platysiagidae Temporal range: Early Triassic–Early Jurassic

Scientific classification
- Kingdom: Animalia
- Phylum: Chordata
- Class: Actinopterygii
- Subclass: Neopterygii
- Order: †Platysiagiformes
- Family: †Platysiagidae; Brough, 1939

Extinct family of ray-finned fishes

Platysiagidae is an extinct family of stem-neopterygian ray-finned fish which lived from the Early Triassic to the Early Jurassic. It includes the genera Helmolepis, Platysiagum and possibly Caelatichthys. The family was formerly placed within the paraphyletic order Perleidiformes, but it is now considered to belong to the separate, monotypic order Platysiagiformes.
