= Polzbergia =

Polzbergia Temporal range: Carnian

Scientific classification
- Kingdom: Animalia
- Phylum: Chordata
- Class: Actinopterygii
- Order: †Perleidiformes
- Family: †Polzbergiidae
- Genus: †Polzbergia

Extinct genus of fishes

Polzbergia is an extinct genus of prehistoric bony fish that lived during the Carnian stage of the Late Triassic epoch.

== See also ==
- Prehistoric fish
- List of prehistoric bony fish
