= Chaohuperleidus =

Chaohuperleidus Temporal range: Olenekian

Scientific classification
- Kingdom: Animalia
- Phylum: Chordata
- Class: Actinopterygii
- Order: †Perleidiformes
- Family: †Perleididae
- Genus: †Chaohuperleidus
- Species: †C. primus

Binomial name
- †Chaohuperleidus primus Sun et al., 2013

Chaohuperleidus is an extinct genus of perleidid that lived during the Olenekian stage of the Early Triassic epoch.

== Distribution ==
Chaohuperleidus primus is known from the Nanlinghu Formation of China.
