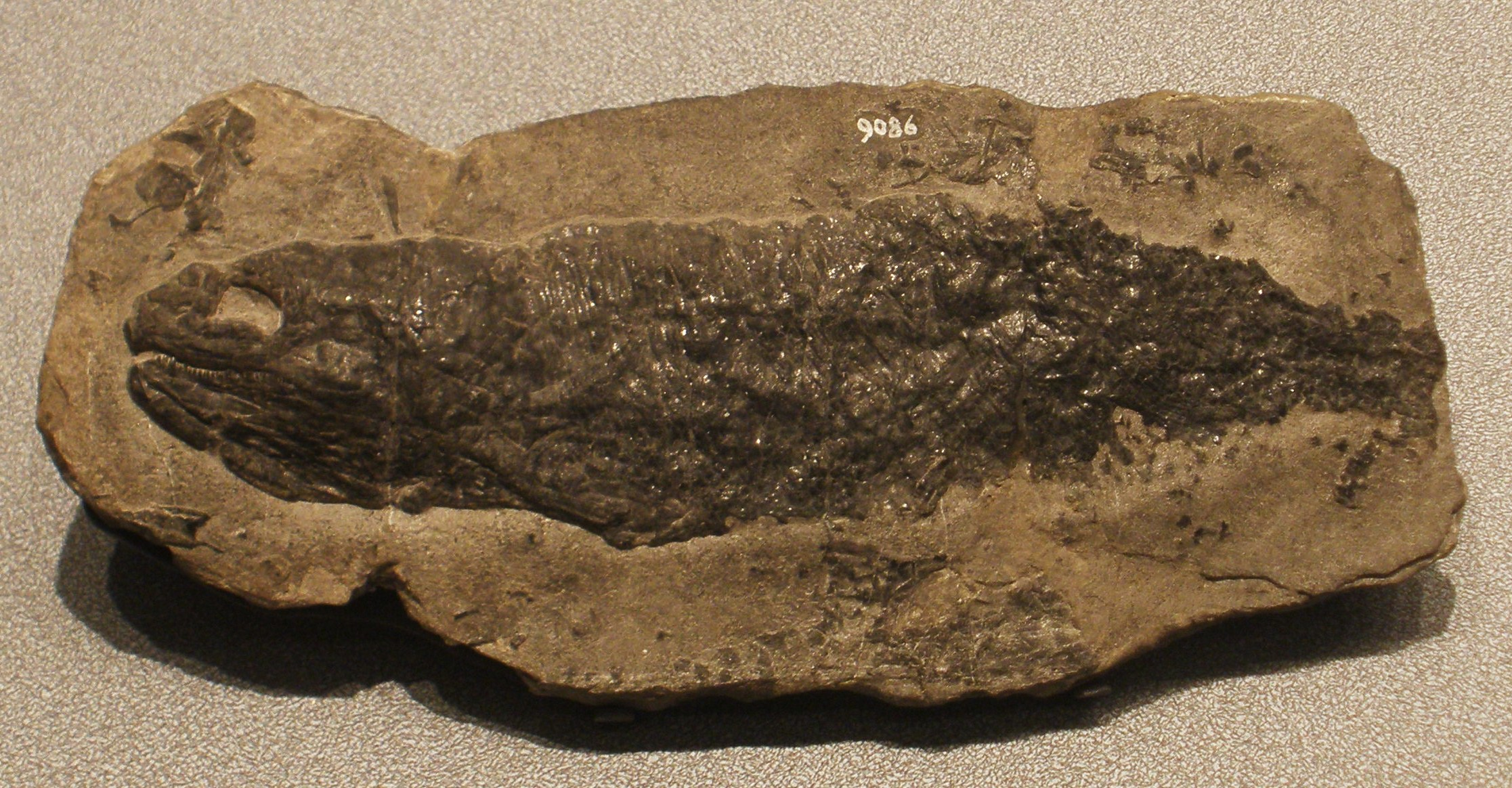
- Fossil specimen at Museo Civico Scienze Naturali Enrico Caffi

Scientific classification
- Kingdom: Animalia
- Phylum: Chordata
- Class: Actinopterygii
- Order: †Colobodontiformes
- Family: †Colobodontidae
- Genus: †Gabanellia; Tintori & Lombardo, 1996
- Species: †G. agilis

Binomial name
- †Gabanellia agilis Tintori & Lombardo, 1996

= Gabanellia =

Gabanellia Temporal range: Late Triassic (Norian), 215–211 Ma

Genus of fishes

Gabanellia is an extinct genus of marine ray-finned fish from the Late Triassic of Italy. It contains a single species, G. agilis, from the Norian-aged Calcare di Zorzino formation.

It was previously placed in the order Perleidiformes as the only member of the family Gabanelliidae. However, in a 2022 taxonomic revision of "perleidiform"-type fish, it was found to instead belong to the family Colobodontidae, within the newly-defined Colobodontiformes.
