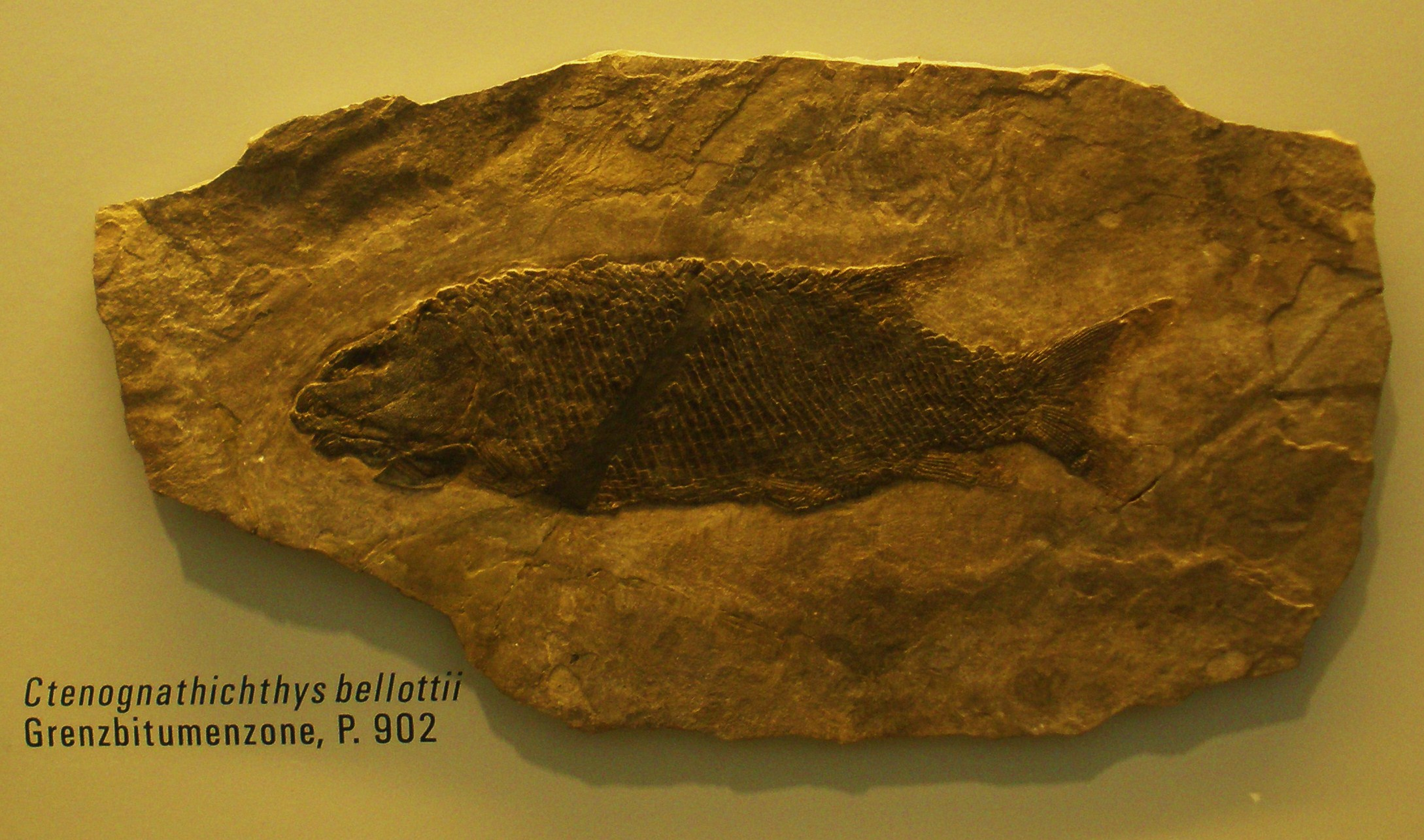
- Fossil from Monte San Giorgio

Scientific classification
- Kingdom: Animalia
- Phylum: Chordata
- Class: Actinopterygii
- Order: †Louwoichthyiformes
- Family: †Louwoichthyidae
- Genus: †Ctenognathichthys; Bürgin, 1992
- Species: †C. bellottii

Binomial name
- †Ctenognathichthys bellottii (de Alessandri, 1910)

Synonyms
- †Heterolepidotus bellottii de Alessandri, 1910

= Ctenognathichthys =

Ctenognathichthys Temporal range: Anisian–Ladinian

Extinct genus of fishes

Ctenognathichthys is an extinct genus of prehistoric marine ray-finned fish that lived during the Middle Triassic epoch of Europe, in the former Tethys Ocean.

== Taxonomy and occurrence ==
It contains a single species, C. bellottii from the Anisian–Ladinian-aged Besano Formation of Monte San Giorgio area (Swiss-Italian borderland), the early Ladinian Prosanto Formation of canton Graubünden, Switzerland, and possibly the late Ladinian Alcover Unit of Spain. Indeterminate remains are known from the middle Anisian of the Strelovec Formation of Slovenia. A second species (C. hattichi Bürgin & Herzog 2002) from the Prosanto Formation was previously placed in this genus, but a 2009 study placed it in the new genus Luopingichthys alongside a species from China.

=== Classification ===
Ctenognathichthys was first classified as a member of the family Perleididae and order Perleidiformes, a group that is now considered paraphyletic. More recently, it has been reclassified into the family Louwoichthyidae (order Louwoichthyiformes).

== Description ==
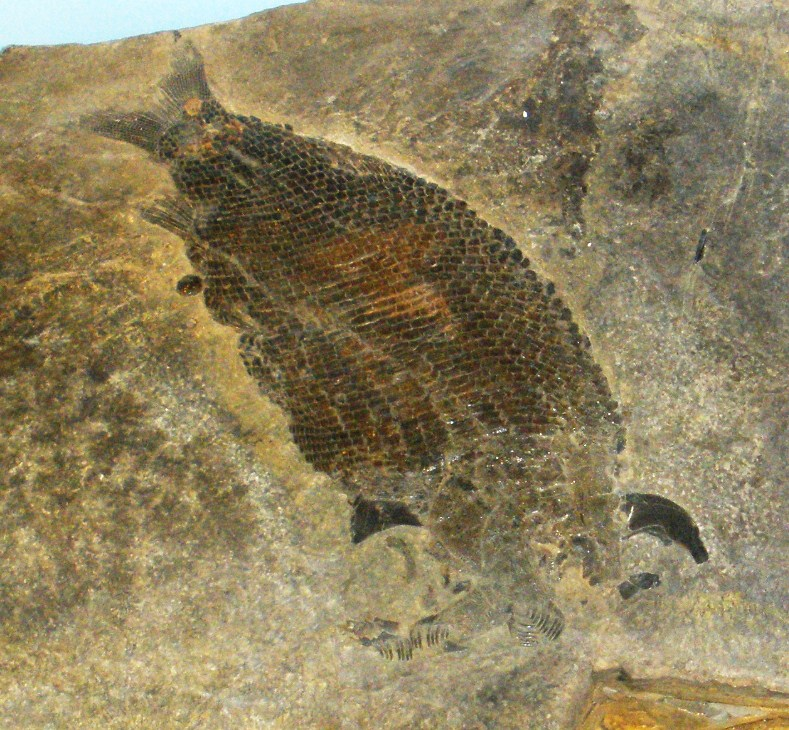
Ctenognathichthys sp. fossil showing the elongate prehensile teeth

It was a small fish measuring 21 cm (8.3 in) in total length. It had long prehensile teeth in its upper and lower jaws.

== See also ==
- Prehistoric fish
- List of prehistoric bony fish
