= Peltoperleidus =

Peltoperleidus Temporal range: Early Ladinian

Scientific classification
- Domain: Eukaryota
- Kingdom: Animalia
- Phylum: Chordata
- Class: Actinopterygii
- Order: †Perleidiformes
- Genus: †Peltoperleidus; Bürgin et al., 1991

Extinct genus of fishes

Peltoperleidus is an extinct genus of prehistoric bony fish that lived during the early Ladinian stage of the Middle Triassic epoch.

== See also ==
- Prehistoric fish
- List of prehistoric bony fish
