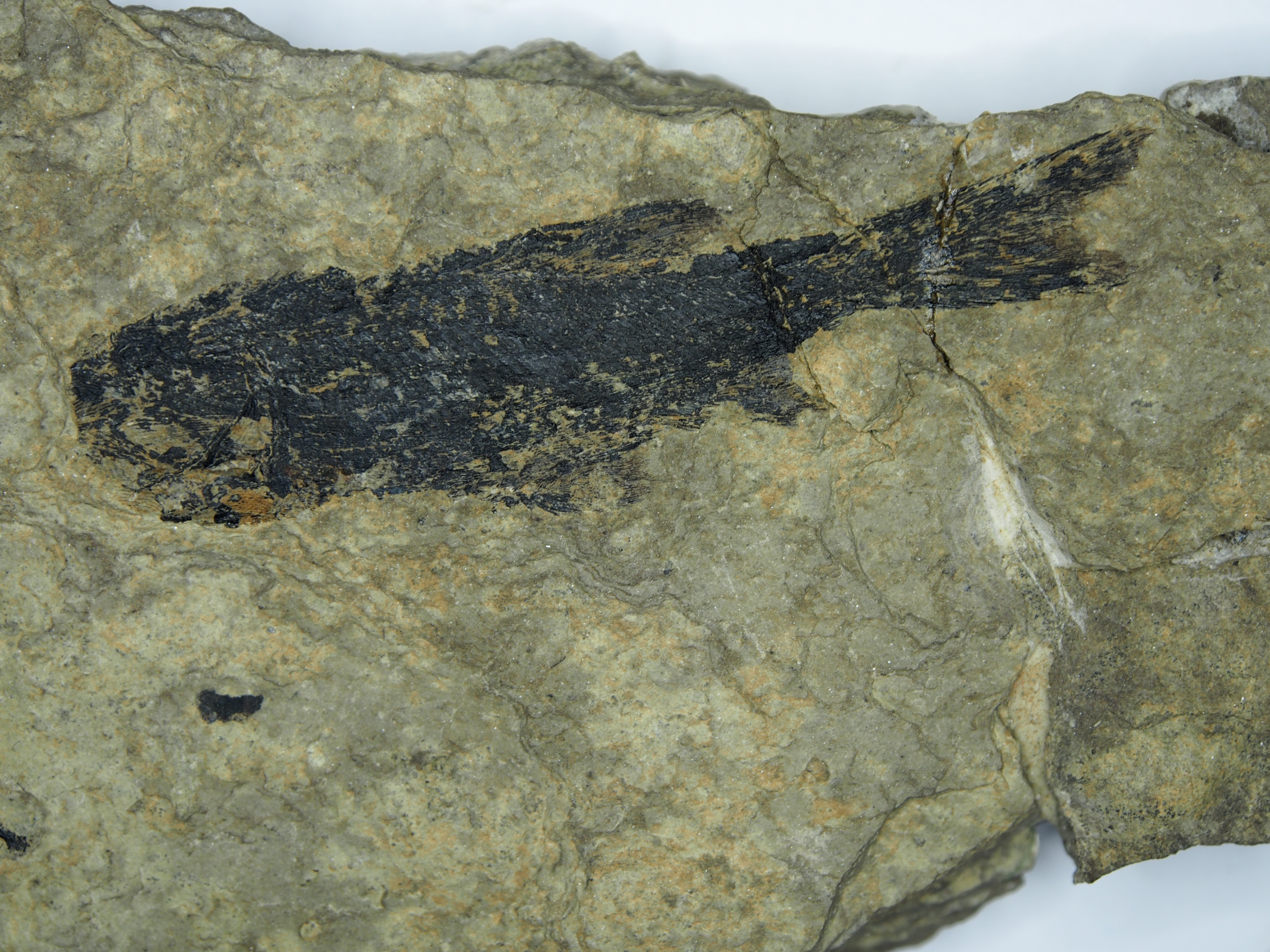
- †Moythomasia nitida Gross 1953 from the Devonian (Givetian) of Bergisch-Gladbach, Germany.

Scientific classification
- Kingdom: Animalia
- Phylum: Chordata
- Class: Actinopterygii
- Family: †Moythomasiidae; Kazantseva, 1971
- Genus: †Moythomasia; Gross, 1950 non Whitley, 1951

Species
- M. devonica (Clarke, 1885); M. durgaringa Gardiner & Bartram, 1977; M. lebedevi Plax, Bakaev & Naugolnykh, 2025; M. lineata Choo, 2015; M. nitida Gross, 1953; M. perforata (Gross, 1942)

Synonyms
- Aldingeria Gross, 1942 non Moy-Thomas, 1942

= Moythomasia =

Moythomasia Temporal range: Middle Devonian–Late Devonian

Extinct genus of ray-finned fishes

Moythomasia (named for James Alan Moy-Thomas) is an extinct genus of early ray-finned fish from the Devonian period, known from fossils found in Europe and Australia.

Moythomasia was a small freshwater fish, measuring about 9 centimetres (3.5 in) in length. It had relatively large eyes, likely to help it locate prey in murky water. Its body was covered in specialized ganoid scales; the upper side of each scale featured a small pin that perfectly fit into a hollow on the lower side of the adjacent scale. This unique structure provided both armor and flexibility.

== Species ==
- M. devonica (Clarke, 1885) [Palaeoniscus devonicus Clarke, 1885; Rhadinichthys devonicus (Clarke, 1885)]
- M. durgaringa Gardiner & Bartram, 1977
- M. lebedevi Plax, Bakaev & Naugolnykh, 2025
- M. lineata Choo, 2015
- M. nitida Gross, 1953
- M. perforata (Gross, 1942) [Aldingeria perforata Gross, 1942]

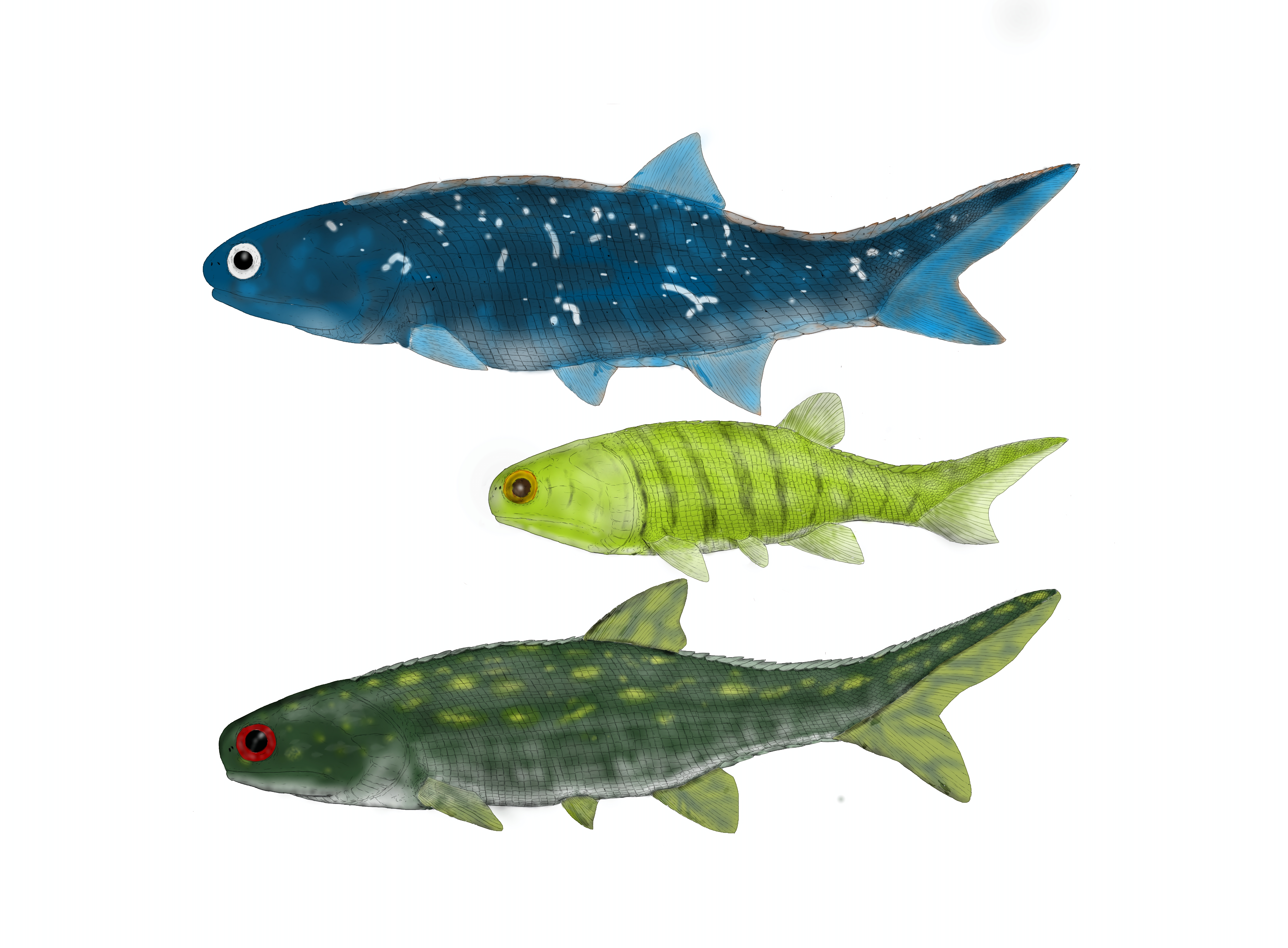
Reconstruction of M. durgaringa (top), M. nitida (middle), and M. lineata (bottom) based on Brian Choo's (2015) skeletal restoration
