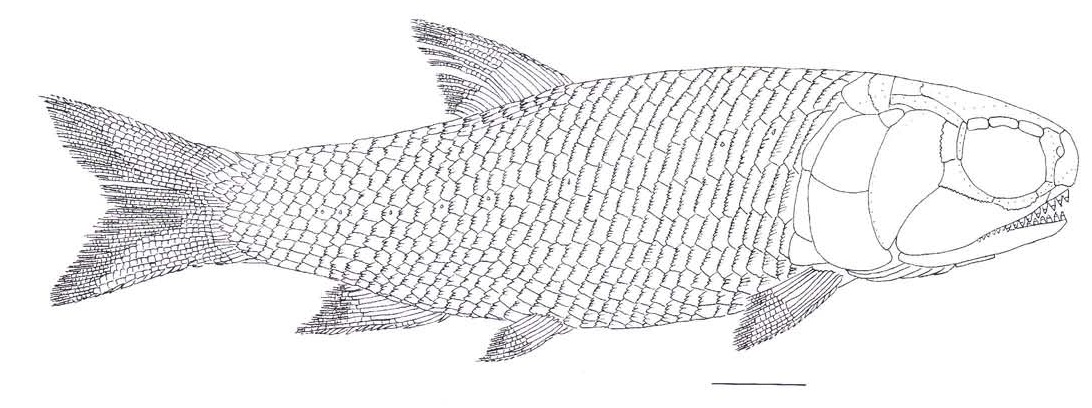
- Restoration of P. altolepis

Scientific classification
- Kingdom: Animalia
- Phylum: Chordata
- Class: Actinopterygii
- Order: †Perleidiformes
- Family: †Perleididae
- Genus: †Perleidus; De Alessandri, 1911

Type species
- †Perleidus altolepis (Deecke, 1889)

Other species
- †P. sinensis Lombardo et al., 2011

= Perleidus =

Perleidus Temporal range: Middle Triassic

Extinct genus of fishes

Perleidus is an extinct genus of ray-finned fish from the Triassic period. Fossils have been found in the Middle Triassic of Italy, Switzerland, and China. The inclusion of Early Triassic species in the genus Perleidus was questioned.

== Ecology ==
Perleidus was a marine predatory fish, about 15 centimetres (5.9 in) in length. Its jaws hung vertically under the braincase, allowing them to open wide, a feature it shared with the earlier palaeonisciform fish, from which it may have been descended. Unlike those earlier fish, however, Perleidus and its relatives had highly flexible dorsal and anal fins, with a reduced number of fin rays. This would have made the fish more agile in the water.

== Classification ==
The genus Perleidus currently comprises two species: P. altolepis (type) and P. sinensis.

The type species was originally described as Semionotus altolepis by Wilhelm Deecke. The genus Perleidus was later erected for this species, named after the comune (municipality) of Perledo in the Province of Lecco in Lombardy, northern Italy. Several species from the Early Triassic were subsequently referred to the genus Perleidus based on superficial resemblances. In 2017, a new genus, Teffichthys, was erected for Early Triassic species of "Perleidus".

Perleidus is the name giving taxon for the family Perleididae and the order Perleidiformes.

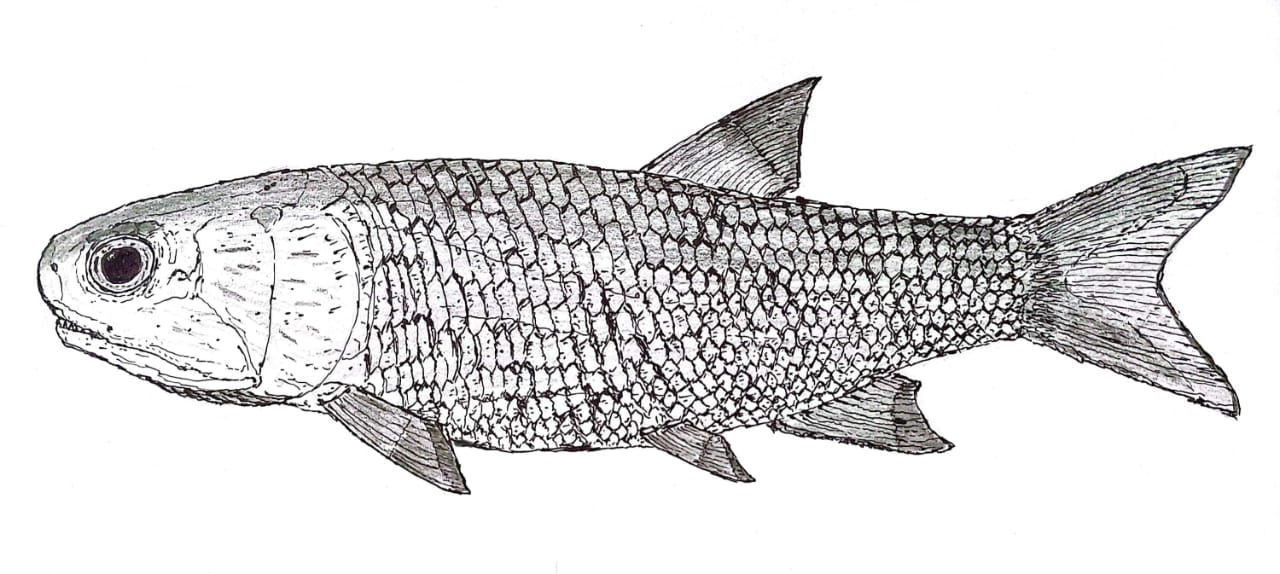
Perleidus altolepis
