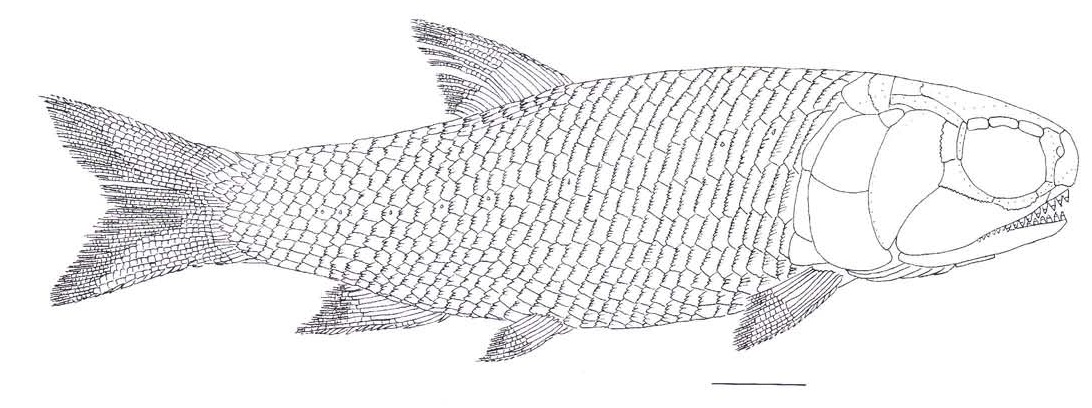
- Perleidus altolepis

Scientific classification
- Kingdom: Animalia
- Phylum: Chordata
- Class: Actinopterygii
- Subclass: Neopterygii
- Order: †Perleidiformes; Berg, 1937

Families
- †Aethodontidae; †Cephaloxenidae; †Cleithrolepididae; †Gabanellidae; †Perleididae; †Platysiagidae; †Polzbergiidae; †Pseudobeaconiidae; †Saurichthyes

Synonyms
- Perleidida; Polzbergiiformes Griffith 1977; Cephaloxeniformes; Platysiagiformes Brough 1939; Platysiagida Fowler 1958

= Perleidiformes =

Perleidiformes Temporal range: Triassic

Extinct order of fishes

Perleidiformes are an extinct order of prehistoric ray-finned fish from the Triassic period Although numerous Triassic taxa have been referred to Perleidiformes, which ones should be included for it to form a monophyletic group is a matter of ongoing scientific debate.

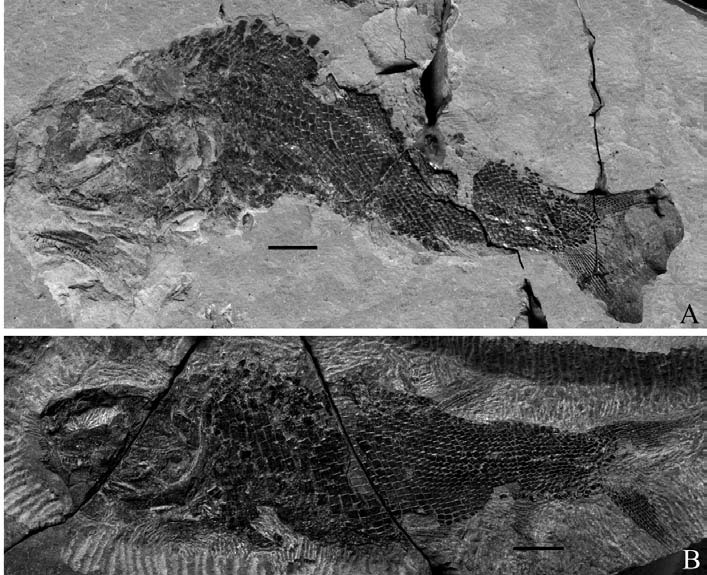
Chaohuperleidus primus, one of the earliest perleidids

== Classification ==
- Genus † Saurichthyes
  - Family †Cleithrolepididae Wade 1935 corrig. [Cleithrolepidae Wade 1935; Hydropessidae Hutchinson 1973]
    - Genus †Hydropessum Broom 1909
    - Genus †Cleithrolepidina Berg 1955
    - Genus †Cleithrolepis Egerton 1864
    - Genus †Dipteronotus Egerton 1864
  - Suborder †Cephaloxenoidei Lehman 1966
    - Family †Cephaloxenidae Brough 1939
      - Genus †Cephaloxenus Brough 1939
  - Suborder †Perleidoidei
    - Family †Platysiagidae Brough 1939 sensu Neuman & Mutter 2005
      - Genus †Caelatichthys Lombardo 2002
      - Genus †Helmolepis Stensiö 1932
      - Genus †Platysiagum Egerton 1872
    - Family †Polzbergiidae Griffin 1977
      - Genus †Luopingichthys Sun et al. 2009
      - Genus †Serrolepis Quenstedt 1852 ex Dames 1888
      - Genus †Ctenognathichthys Burgin 1992
      - Genus †Stoppania Lombardo, Rusconi & Tintori 2008
      - Genus †Polzbergia Griffith 1977
      - Genus †Felberia Lombardo & Tintori 2004
    - Family †Gabanellidae Tintori & Lombardo 1996
      - Genus †Gabanellia Tintori & Lombardo 1996
    - Family †Aetheodontidae Brough 1939
      - Genus †Aetheodontus Brough 1939
    - Family †Pseudobeaconiidae López-Arbarello & Zavattieri 2008
      - Genus †Caminchaia Rusconi 1946a
      - Genus †Echentaia Rusconi 1946
      - Genus †Pasambaya Rusconi 1946a
      - Genus †Anatoia Rusconi 1946a
      - Genus †Pseudobeaconia Bordas 1944
    - Family †Perleididae Brough 1931 [Fuyuanperleididae Sun et al. 2012]
      - Genus †Altisolepis Mutter & Herzog 2004
      - Genus †Alvinia Sytchevskaya 1999 non Monterosato 1884
      - Genus †Chaohuperleidus Sun et al., 2013
      - Genus †Daninia Lombardo 2001
      - Genus †Diandongperleidus Geng et al. 2012
      - Genus †Endennia Lombardo & Brambillasca 2005
      - Genus †Fuyuanperleidus Geng et al. 2012
      - Genus †Luopingperleidus Geng et al. 2012
      - Genus †Megaperleidus Sytchevskaya 1999
      - Genus †Mendocinichthys Whitley 1953 [Mendocinia Bordas 1944 non Jensen-Haarup 1920]
      - Genus †Paraperleidus Zhao & Liu 2007
      - Genus †Peltoperleidus Bürgin et al. 1991
      - Genus †Plesioperleidus Su & Li 1983 sensu Tong et al. 2006 [Zhangina Liu 2002]
      - Genus †Perleidus De Alessandri 1910 sensu Lombardo et al. 2011
