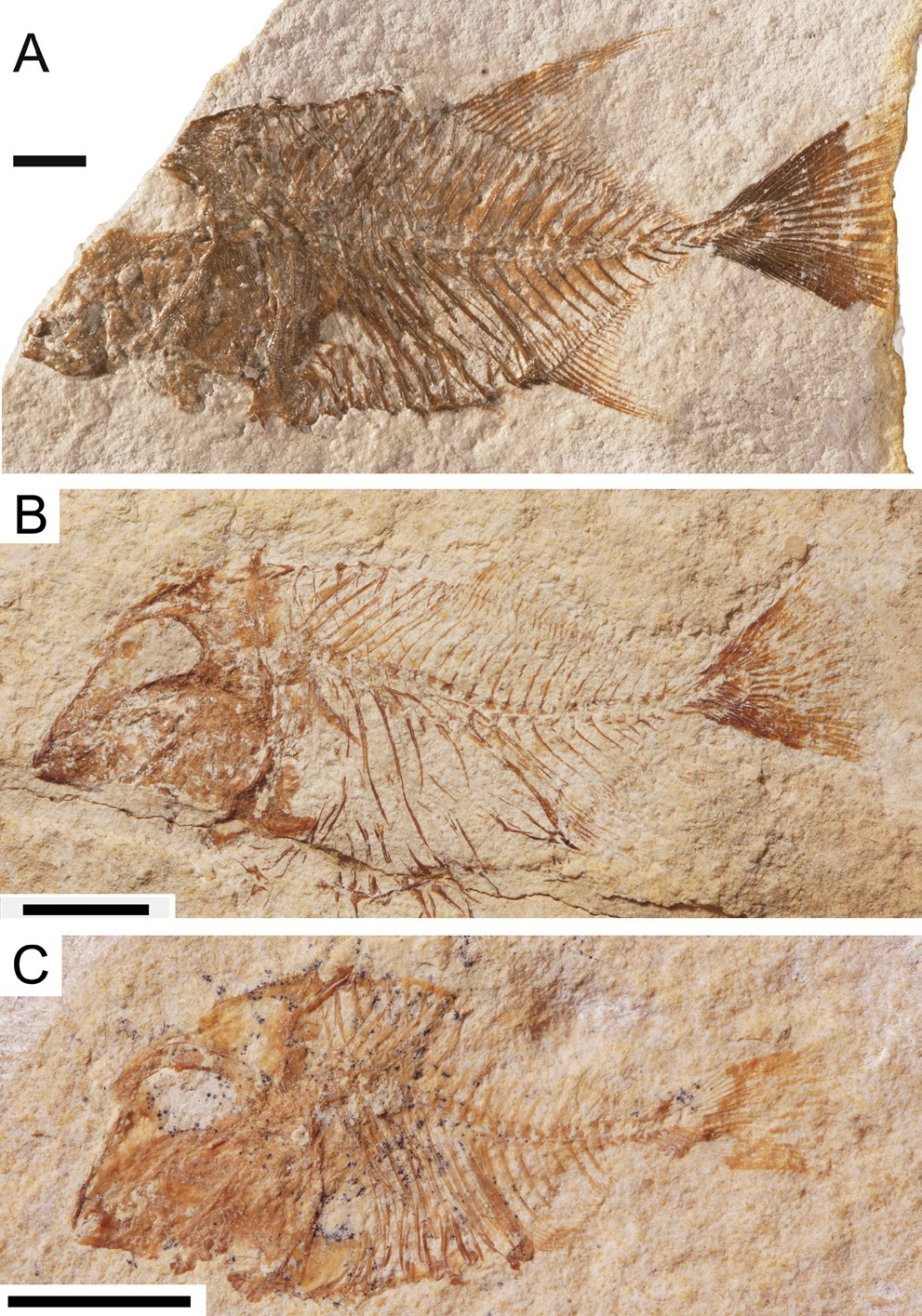
- Specimens of Sylvienodus laiverensis

Scientific classification
- Kingdom: Animalia
- Phylum: Chordata
- Class: Actinopterygii
- Order: †Pycnodontiformes
- Family: †Pycnodontidae
- Subfamily: †Pycnodontinae
- Genus: †Sylvienodus; Taverne & Capasso, 2013

Type species
- S. laveirensis Poyato-Ariza, 2013

Synonyms
- †"Pycnodus" laveirensis Veiga Ferreira, 1961

= Sylvienodus =

Sylvienodus Temporal range: Late Cenomanian 97.2–93.9 Ma

Extinct genus of fish

Sylvienodus is an extinct genus of small pycnodontid pycnodont from Portugal, living during the late Cenomanian. The genus was originally described as a species within the genus Pycnodus before being moved to its own genus due to a number of features. The most notable of these is its extremely long anal and dorsal fin that point posteriorly, this is in contrast to the overall short fins seen in other members of its subfamily. Not much is known about the paleoenvironment of the genus, though it is suspected to have lived in marine environments due to the presence of marine invertebrates found at the same outcrop. There is one species currently recognized: S. laveirensis.

== History and Classification ==
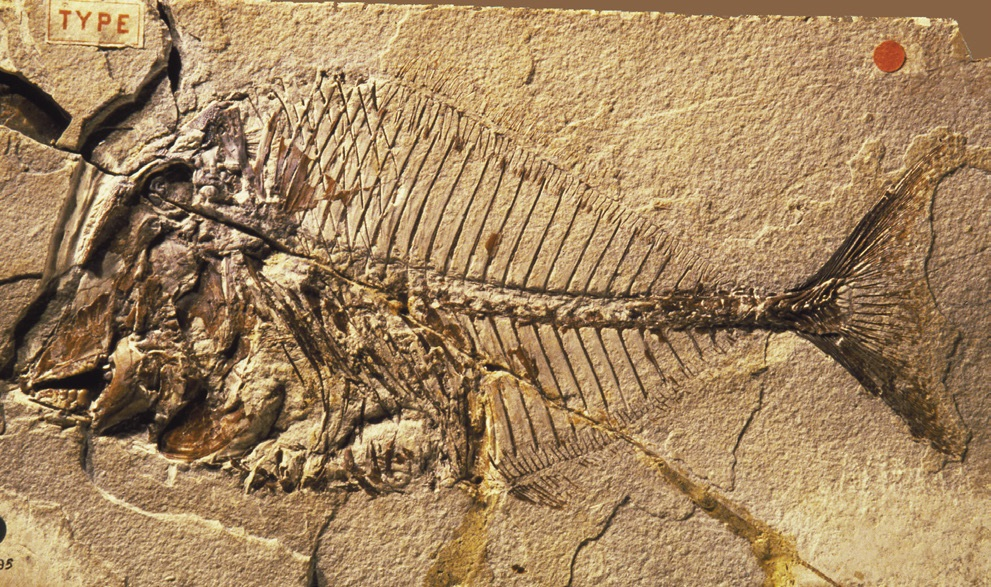
A specimen of Pycnodus apodus, the type species for the genus the species was originally assigned to.

The material of Sylvienodus would first be described under the name Pycnodus laveirensis by Veiga Ferreira in 1961 based on a total of six specimens found within a Cenomanian outcrop located 340 metres (1,120 ft) east of Laveiras, Caixas, Portugal. The author would name it as a separate species within the genus due to the shape of the fins along with the number of rays. Another specimen would later be described by S. Jonet in 1964 which would give a better look at the dentition of the fish. It wouldn't be until 2002 that, in a publication by Francisco José Poyato-Ariza and Sylvie Wenz, it would be brought up that the specimens were most likely all juvenile and that the validity and assessment to the genus should be reviewed. The publication would also consider the species a nomen dubium. This revision would later happen by Francisco José Poyato-Ariza in 2013 with the species being placed within its own genus along with it being brought up that not all specimens were actually juveniles. The same author, Francisco José Poyato-Ariza, would also amended the diagnoses of the genus in 2020 within a revision of the subfamily Pycnodontinae.

Before the reassessment of the species, the taxon lacked a holotype due to one not being assigned in the publication. This would make all specimens described in the original publication syntypes with the assignment of a lectotype being done in the 2013 publication by Poyato-Ariza. The specimen chosen to be the lectotype would end up being LNEG–MG 6659 due to it representing an adult individual with all other specimens becoming paralectotypes.

The name of Sylvienodus derives from the first name of Sylvie Wenz, a French paleontologist, along with the word "nodus", the suffix of Pycnodus, the genus that the species was originally assigned to. The species name "laveirensis" on the other hand is in reference to the locality it was found in, Laveiras, with it being a Latin adjective that translates to "from Laveiras".

=== Classification ===
In the 2013 description paper of the genus, Poyato-Ariza would cautiously suggest that Sylvienodus could be placed in the subfamily Pycnodontinae due to the presence of a gap at the back of the skull that exposes the endocranium. This, however, is the only diagnostic feature the genus shares with the family though there are other genera within the subfamily that don't have all of the features associated with the group. Though this placement would not be fully supported by the author of the original publication, the genus would be listed as a member of the subfamily in a few publications by Louis Taverne and Luigi Capasso along with in a 2020 paper by Francisco José Poyato-Ariza that would more confidentially place Sylvienodus as a member of Pycnodontinae. Below are the phylogenic trees included in the 2013 description of the genus along with the 2020 reassessment of the subfamily Pycnodontinae.

Poyato-Ariza (2013)

- Pycnodontiformes
  - Mesturidae
  - - Gyrodus
    - - Arduafrons
      - - Brembodontidae
        - - Eomesodon
          - Pycnodontoidei
            - Coccodontidae
            - Pycnodontidae
              - Turbomesodon
              - - Ocloedus
                - - Tepexichthys
                  - - Proscinetinae
                    - - Coelodus
                      - - Sylvienodus
                        - Polazzodus
                        - Pycnodus
                      - - Nursallinae

Poyato-Ariza (2020)

- Pycnodontinae
  - Sylvienodus
  - - - Polazzodus coronatus
      - Polazzodus gridelli
    - - Tergestinia
      - Pycnodontini
        - Oropycnodus
        - - Pycnodus

== Description ==
Sylvienodus was an extremely small, deep-bodied fish with an estimated adult standard length of 57 millimetres (2.2 in). Though similar in shape to a close relative, Polazzodus, the fish had a deeper body than most pycnodonts with the maximum depth of the adult specimen being 41% of the standard length. Though this is smaller than what is seen in juvenile specimens which have a depth that's between 46%-47% of the standard length, that still means that at its deepest, it's about half as deep as it is long. This deepest point is located at the insertion point of the dorsal fin.

=== Skull ===
The skull of Sylvienodus is short but tall, still making up 32% of the standard length of the fish. The main differences in the skull between this fish and its relatives comes from the mouth with only of the more subtle but important examples coming from the tooth count. Unlike in Pycnodus, Sylvienodus only has a single premaxillary tooth though they are similar in morphology. Like other members of Pycnodontoidea, these front teeth are incisiform with these being much larger than the teeth on the lower jaw of the fish. Another strange feature of the genus is the maxilla of the fish which is ornamented and is generally described as being ax-shaped which wildly differs from Pycnodus which has a maxilla that is kidney-shaped. Like other members of the subfamily, large amounts of the posterior endocranium is exposed. The skull roof is generally similar to other pycnodonts, having a long, slender frontal with a short postorbital region. However, the parietal peniculus, a brush-like process coming off posteriorly from the parietal bone, is very short which is in contrast to other pycnodonts that possess it.

Like some other pycnodontines such as Polazzodus, the opercular region of the fish is very reduced, the opercular bone itself being extremely reduced. Due to this, the region is largely made up of the preopercular and the dermohyomandibula which are about the same size as one another and are partially fused at the posterior section of the bone. This fusion is only seen in some specimens with this being partially present in juvenile specimens and fully shown in the adult lectotype.

=== Postcranium ===
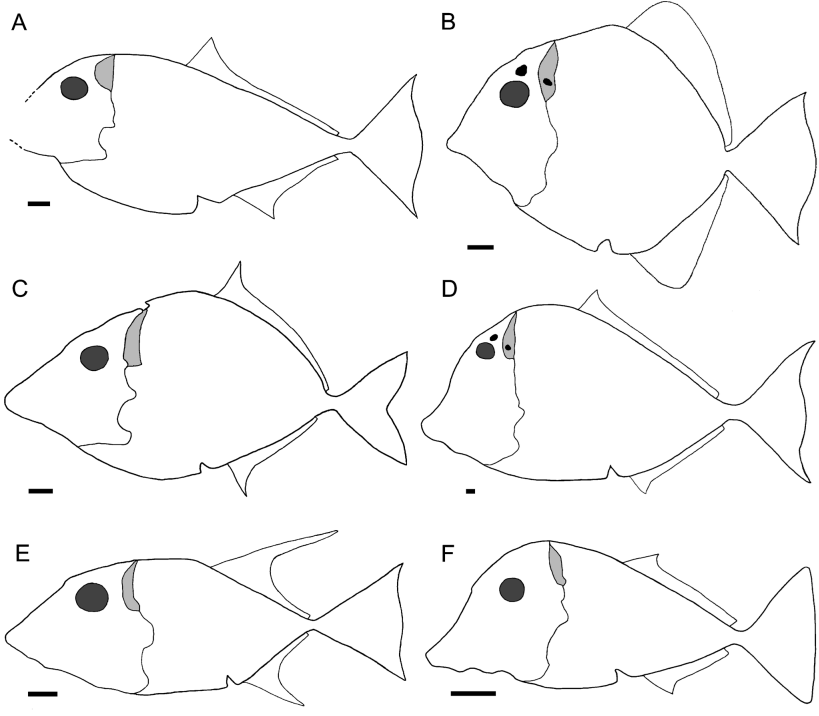
Body outlines of various members of Pycnodontinae, Sylvienodus is the outline labeled "E"

The postcranium of Sylvienodus was generally similar to other pycnodonts in having 23 vertebrae in the axial skeleton with 12 being abdominal vertebrae and 11 being caudal vertebrae. This is less than what is seen in a number of close relatives which more often than not have a total of 29. Also similar to most pycnodonts, the haemal and neural spines all possess sagittal flanges at the front. One major difference between the genus and Pycnodus itself is the presence of only a single projection on the arcocentrum rather than multiple. One of the more notable features of the genus is the shape of the anal and dorsal fins which each start with extremely long fin rays, with the fins as a whole to point posteriorly. After these first few large rays, the rays begin to get shorter with the longest rays in the dorsal fin to be up to 8 times the length of the shortest ones. Along with this, these long fin rays cause the dorsal fin to be taller than it is long. These are seen as fin rays 1-7 out of the 37 rays of the dorsal fin and fin rays 1–5 on the anal fin. The paired fins are much less well preserved than the unpaired fins with the pectoral fins being much larger than the pelvic fins. While the pectorals were made from 20 fin rays, it is unknown how many are in the pelvic fins. The only thing known about these tiny fins are the size and their placement right in front of the cloaca. The caudal fin is generally different than what is seen in close relatives of Sylvienodus with it having two notches on the posterior edge of the fin in contrast to the more uniform shape seen in genera such as Tergestinia.

The squamation of Sylvienodus is generally similar to other derived pycnodonts with it being described as having a clathrate pattern. Also like other pycnodonts, the fish has more unique scales on the top and bottom of the body; both of which are commonly referred to as scutes. There are 12 dorsal ridge scales with the 1st scale being a part of the skull roof. The 2nd dorsal scale ridge, in contrast, is a bit larger and possesses a large, frontwards-facing projection that points slightly downwards. There is a small round notch present between these two scutes. The other scutes along the dorsal midline are generally thin with ridges at the top. The ventral scutes go along the bottom slightly past the cloaca with 13 out of the 15 being present before it. They are larger but more simple than those seen at the dorsal midline, each having between one and four spines depending on the position on the body. Like the rest of the squamation, these scales are similar to what is seen in a number of other pycnodonts.

== Paleobiology ==
Very little is known about the paleoenvironment of Sylvienodus though it would have most likely lived in marine environments due to the presence of several groups of marine invertebrates found at the locality.
