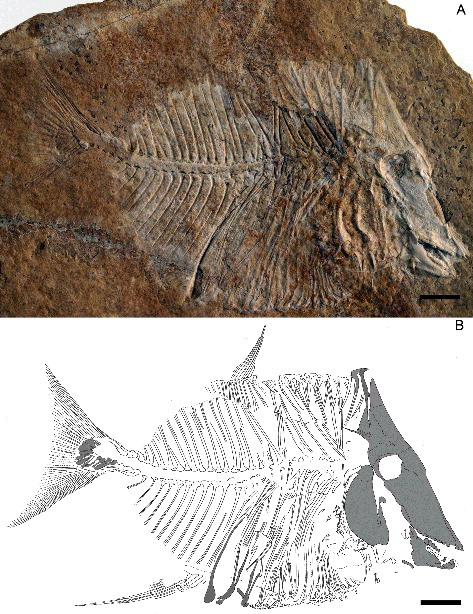
- Image and camera lucidia drawing of the holotype (SMNK-PAL. 8613)

Scientific classification
- Domain: Eukaryota
- Kingdom: Animalia
- Phylum: Chordata
- Class: Actinopterygii
- Order: †Pycnodontiformes
- Family: †Pycnodontidae
- Subfamily: †Pycnodontinae
- Genus: †Scalacurvichthys; Cawley, and Kriwet 2017

Type species
- †Scalacurvichthys naishi John Cawley, and Jürgen Kriwet, 2017

= Scalacurvichthys =

Scalacurvichthys Temporal range: Cenomanian, 100.5–93.9 Ma

Genus of pycnotontinae fish from the Late Cretaceous

Scalacurvichthys (meaning "curved scale fish") is an extinct genus of pycnodontine pycnodontiform fish from the Amminadav Formation or Bet-Meir Formation in the West Bank; Palestine. The type species is S. naishi, only known from the holotype.

== Etymology ==
The generic name, Scalacurvichthys, is derived from the Latin words 'scala' and 'curva'. 'Scala' translates to scale, and 'curva' translates to curved. This is in reference to the raised, anterior-facing first dorsal ridge scale protruding above the skull roof. And the Greek word 'ἰχθύς' which translates to fish. The specific name, naishi, is dedicated to Dr. Darren Naish, who is a prominent palaeontologist and the founder of the vertebrate palaeozoology blog Tetrapod Zoology, and its accompanying convention TetZooCon.

== Description ==
Scalacurvichthys is known only from the holotype, SMNK-PAL. 8613, which was described by Cawley and Kriwet (2017). The holotype measures at around 12.3 cm (4.8 in) in length. It consists of an almost completely and fully articulated specimen, however, it is lacking some cranial and postcranial details due to taphonomic processes. Several morphological elements, especially of the postcranial skeleton, are preserved and recognizable only as imprints.

== Classification ==
In their phylogenetic analysis, Cawley and Kriwet (2017) recovered Scalacurvichthys amongst the pycnodontine grade of pycnodontiforms, most closely related to Oropycnodus and other pycnodontines. The following cladogram represents the phylogenetic results of a consensus tree, with unordered characters based on the modified database of Poyato-Ariza and Wenz (2002). The original tree used several members outside of Pycnodontidae and Pycnodontiformes as an outgroup, however, for the sake of simplicity, only members of Pycnodontidae are shown below.

- Pycnodontidae
  - Stenamara
  - - Turbomesodon bemissartensis
    - - Turbomesodon praeclarus
      - - Turbomesodon relegans
        - - Anomoeodus
          - Stemmatodus
          - - Coelodus subdiscus
            - - - - Coelodus satumus
                  - Iemanja
                - - Tepexichthys
                  - Proscinitinae
              - Pycnodontinae
                - Scalacurvichthys
                - - Oropycnodus
                  - - Pychnodus
                    - - Nursallia veronae
                      - - Paranursallia
                        - - Abdobalistum
                          - Nursallia? goedeli
                          - Palaeobalistum
