= Angeac-Charente bonebed =

- Stratigraphic range: Berriasian
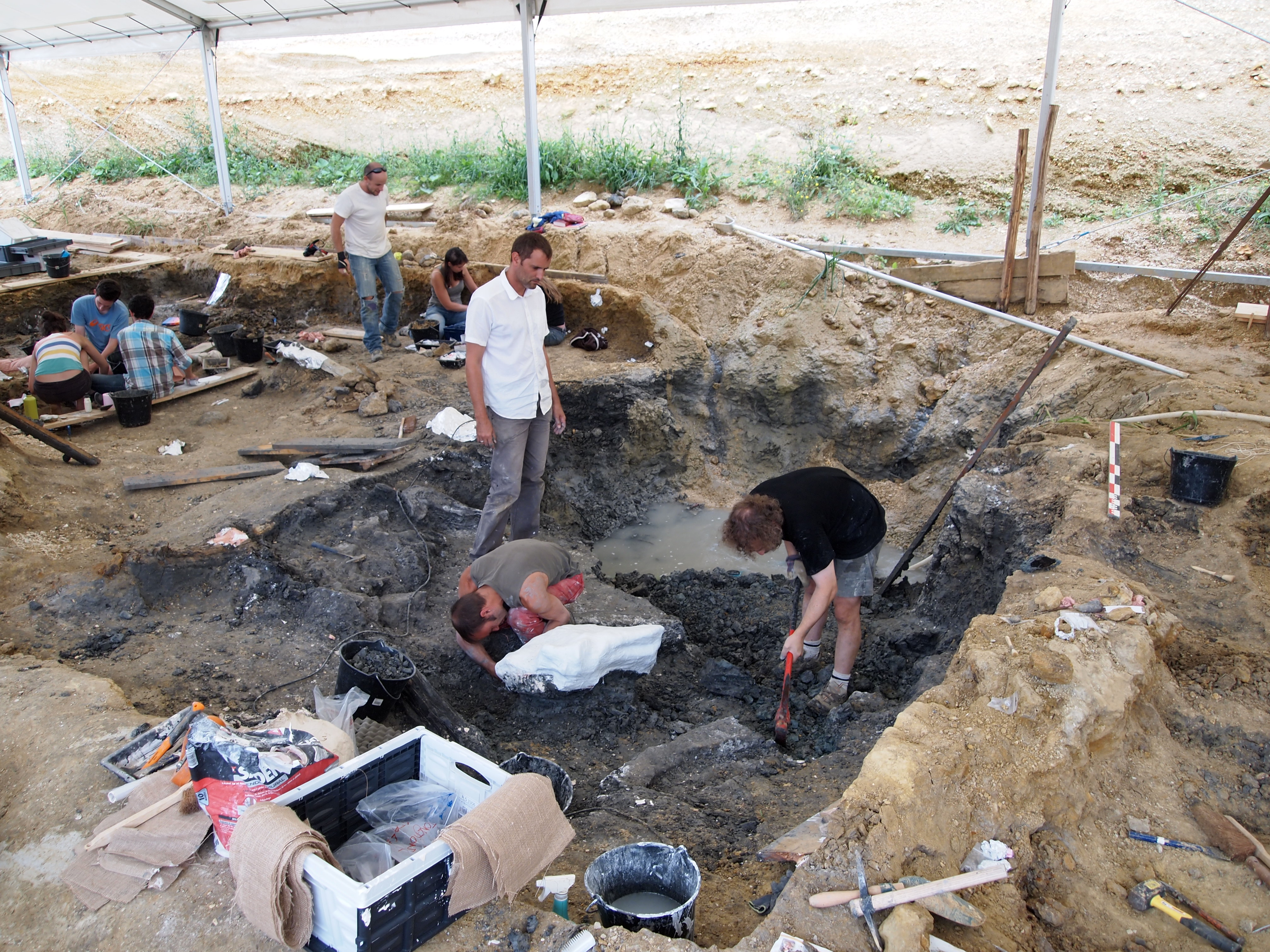
- The Angeac-Charente bonebed in 2011.
- Type: Bed
- Underlies: Unconformity with Pleistocene deposits
- Thickness: 2 metres

Lithology
- Primary: Clay

Location
- Region: Charente
- Country: France
- Extent: Aquitaine Basin

The Angeac-Charente bonebed is a fossil deposit located near Angeac-Charente in western France. It dates to the Berriasian stage of the Early Cretaceous, and is coeval with the Purbeck Group of Southern England. It has amongst the most diverse assemblages of earliest Cretaceous vertebrates known from Europe.

== History of discovery ==
Dinosaur bones were first found at the site in 2008. The fossils were exposed during quarrying for overlying Pleistocene aged sand and gravel. After more bones were discovered in 2010, a team was set up composed of people from Musée d’Angoulême, Rennes University and the Muséum national d’Histoire naturelle to excavate the site. Due the promising finds, since 2011 excavations have been conducted at the site annually.

== Geology and Paleoenvironment ==
The site was previously considered Hauterivian-Barremian in age, but is now considered likely middle-late Berriasian in age. The paleoenvironment is considered to have been a freshwater floodplain, dominated by cheirolepidacean conifers, with a tropical or subtropical climate. The lithology of the site is predominantly clay.

== Fossil content ==
Tables follow Allain et al. (2022)

Color key: Taxon / Reclassified taxon / Taxon falsely reported as present / Dubious taxon or junior synonym / Ichnotaxon / Ootaxon / Morphotaxon	Notes; Uncertain or tentative taxa are in small text; ~~crossed out~~ taxa are discredited.

=== Fish ===
Fish of the Angeac bed
Genus	Species	Location	Stratigraphic position	Abundance	Notes	Images
Parvodus	P. celsucuspus			Teeth	Hybodont shark	
Cf. Micropycnodon	Indeterminate			Teeth	Mesturid pycnodontiform fish	
Pycnodontidae	Indeterminate			Teeth		
Ginglymodi	Indeterminate			Teeth and ganoid scales		
Amiiformes	Indeterminate			"teeth, jaw remains and vertebrae"		
Ionoscopiformes	Indeterminate			Teeth		

=== Amphibians ===
Amphibians of the Angeac bed
Genus	Species	Location	Stratigraphic position	Abundance	Notes	Images
Albanerpetontidae	Indeterminate			"dentaries, premaxillae, maxillae, vertebrae and forelimb bones"		
Anura	Indeterminate			Fragmentary bones		
?Caudata	Indeterminate			Vertebra	An assignment to Squamata cannot be excluded	

=== Turtles ===
Turtles of the Angeac bed
Genus	Species	Location	Stratigraphic position	Abundance	Notes	Images
Pleurosternon	P. bullockii			At least 12 individuals as well as one complete shell	Pleurosternid paracryptodire	
Hylaeochelys	H. belli?			"many isolated plates and one incomplete specimen discovered in 2018, consisting of parts of the plastron, some peripherals and both humeri"	Thalassochelydian, represented by juveniles	
Helochelydridae	Indeterminate			"incomplete isolated shell elements covered by typical tubercles, pustules and crests"		

=== Lepidosauria ===
Lepidosaurs of the Angeac bed
Genus	Species	Location	Stratigraphic position	Abundance	Notes	Images
cf. Opisthias	Indeterminate			"posterior dentary fragment bearing two preserved acrodont teeth in addition to seven broken teeth"	Sphenodontian	
Paramacellodus	Indeterminate			"jaw fragment bearing two closely spaced teeth"	Paramacellodid lizard	

=== Choristodera ===
Choristoderes of the Angeac bed
Genus	Species	Location	Stratigraphic position	Abundance	Notes	Images
cf. Cteniogenys	Indeterminate			"A characteristic robust vertebra, as well as a smaller vertebra that probably belongs to a juvenile individual"		

=== Pterosaurs ===
Pterosaurs of the Angeac bed
Genus	Species	Location	Stratigraphic position	Abundance	Notes	Images
Pterosauria	Indeterminate			Teeth of three distinct morphotypes, at least some of which belong to pterodactyloids		

=== Crocodyliforms ===
Crocodyliforms of the Angeac bed
Genus	Species	Location	Stratigraphic position	Abundance	Notes	Images
Goniopholis	Indeterminate			"skull, mandibles, vertebrae, limb, girdle bones and osteoderms" belonging to a single individual, along with other isolated remains	Goniopholidid	
Pholidosaurus	Indeterminate			Teeth	Pholidosaurid	
Theriosuchus	Indeterminate			Teeth	Atoposaurid	
Bernissartiidae	Indeterminate			Teeth		

=== Dinosaurs ===
==== Ornithischians ====
Ornithischians of the Angeac bed
Genus	Species	Location	Stratigraphic position	Abundance	Notes	Images
cf. Echinodon	Indeterminate			Two premaxillary teeth	Heterodontosaurid	
Dacentrurus sensu lato	Indeterminate			84 skeletal elements, including vertebrae, ribs, several phalanges and elements of the braincase, likely belonging to a single individual	Dacentrurine stegosaur	
Hypsilophodontidae	Indeterminate			Premaxillary tooth, maxillary tooth and dentary tooth	Similar to Hypsilophodon	
Camptosauridae	Indeterminate			Dentary tooth, femur		
Ankylosauria	Indeterminate			Tooth and osteoderm		

==== Sauropods ====
Sauropods of the Angeac bed
Genus	Species	Location	Stratigraphic position	Abundance	Notes	Images
Turiasauria (="Francoposeidon")	Indeterminate			"braincase, some skull bones, teeth, cervical, dorsal and caudal vertebrae, chevrons, pelvic girdle and all the limb bones" alongside isolated teeth, belonging to at least 7 individuals	All belongs to a single taxon. An enormous animal, femur length some 2–2.2 metres (6.6–7.2 ft). Probably among the largest known European dinosaurs.	
Macronaria	Indeterminate			Two teeth	Probably closely related to Camarasaurus	

==== Theropods ====
Theropods of the Angeac bed
Genus	Species	Location	Stratigraphic position	Abundance	Notes	Images
cf. Nuthetes	Indeterminate			Several teeth	Dromaeosaurid	
Ornithomimosauria	Undescribed			Isolated remains of at least 70 individuals representing almost all of the skeleton	Most abundant fossil at the site, some authors have argued for a ceratosaur identity	
?Megalosauridae	Indeterminate			large (> 3 cm) blade–like teeth	Likely assignable to a single taxon, possibly assignable to other groups of basal tetanurans	
Tyrannosauroidea	Indeterminate			8 teeth		
Archaeopterygidae	Indeterminate			5 teeth		

=== Mammals ===
Mammals of the Angeac bed
Genus	Species	Location	Stratigraphic position	Abundance	Notes	Images
Thereuodon	T. cf. taraktes			Isolated tooth crown	Symmetrodont	
?Gobiconodon	Indeterminate			Isolated tooth crown	Gobiconodontid	
?Triconodon	Indeterminate			Almost complete tooth	Triconodontid	
Sunnyodon	Indeterminate			Premolar	?Paulchoffatiid Multituberculate	
Spalacotherium	S. evansae			Three teeth	Spalacotheriid	
Peramus	Indeterminate				Peramurid	
Dryolestidae	Indeterminate			two fragmentary molars	Closely related to Guimarotodus and Phascolestes	
Pinheirodontidae	Indeterminate			Numerous teeth	Multituberculate	
