= Fish species in the Western Interior Seaway =

The Western Interior Seaway, was a large inland sea that started to expand in the early Cretaceous period, though geological evidence suggests it started to expand in the late Jurassic period. It existed at its fullest extent from the mid-late Cretaceous period. At its greatest extent it was 600 miles (970 km) wide, 2,000 miles (3,200 km) long, and had a depth maximum depth of 2,500 feet (760 m).

Various different species of fish existed in the Western Interior Seaway, throughout its 30 million time frame. Examples of which

Class	Genus	Extent	Location
Chondrichthyes	Cretolamna	Cretaceous-Miocene	Kansas
Chondrichthyes	Cretoxyrhina	Cenomanian-Campanian	Kansas
Chondrichthyes	Odontaspis	Cretaceous	Delaware
Chondrichthyes	Ptychodus	Albian-Maastrichtian	Kansas
Chondrichthyes	Scapanorhynchus	Cretaceous-Miocene	Worldwide
Chondrichthyes	Squalicorax	Cenomanian-Campanian	Wyoming
Osteichthyes	Micropycnodon	Santonian	Colorado
Actinopterygii	Bananogmius	Santonian-Maastrichtian	South Dakota
Actinopterygii	Belonostomus	Cenomanian-Masstrichtian	Montana
Actinopterygii	Cimolichthys	Cenomanian-Masstrichtian	Canada
Actinopterygii	Elopopsis	Cenomanian-Campanian	Colorado
Actinopterygii	Enchodus	Cretaceous-Paleogene	Colorado
Actinopterygii	Gyrodus	Jurassic-Cretaceous	Canada
Actinopterygii	Leptecodon	Santonian	Kansas
Actinopterygii	Pachyrhizodus	Cenomanian-Maastrichtian	South Dakota
Actinopterygii	Protosphyraena	Coniacian-Maastrichtian	Kansas
Actinopterygii	Saurodon	Coniacian-Santonian	Tennessee
Actinopterygii	Stratodus	Santonian-Maastrichtian	Alabama
Actinopterygii	Xiphactinus	Albian-Maastrichtian	Colorado
