= Congopycnodus =

Congopycnodus Temporal range: ?Kimmeridgian Possible Middle Jurassic occurrence

Scientific classification
- Kingdom: Animalia
- Phylum: Chordata
- Class: Actinopterygii
- Order: †Pycnodontiformes
- Superfamily: †Coccodontoidea
- Genus: †Congopycnodus; Taverne, 2019
- Species: †C. cornutus

Binomial name
- †Congopycnodus cornutus Taverne, 2019

Genus of fish

Congopycnodus is an extinct genus of freshwater pycnodontiform fish from the ?Late Jurassic (Kimmeridgian) of the Democratic Republic of the Congo. It is known from parts of the skull and its distinct nuchal horn that sits atop its head. Congopycnodus is among the earliest non-European pycnodontiforms and may have evolved from ancestors that traveled along the coast of Gondwana before journeying further inland. It is a monotypic genus, meaning it contains only a single species, Congopycnodus cornutus. Its attribution to the pycnodonts has been disputed.

== History and naming ==
Congopycnodus was described on the basis of skull fragments and nuchal horns discovered in the Jurassic Stanleyville Formation near Kisangani, in the Democratic Republic of the Congo. The holotype, which preserves the top of the skull behind the eyes, was discovered in the Stanleyville Otraco locality, while the three additional paratype specimens, all of which consisting of horns in various states of completeness, were found in the Hamamba river sediments.

The genus name Congopycnodus is a combination of Congo, in reference to the animal's country of origin, and Pycnodus. The species name cornutus refers to this genus' nuchal horn.

== Description ==
Congopycnodus was a small fish with a deep and conical occipital region of the skull. The holotype preserves a dermosuproccipital bone, the back of the frontal bone and the parietal bone. The frontal overhangs the eyes and appears to have been covered in long but weak ridges based on the preserved outer layer of the bone. The parietal, which is the hindmost bone of this region of the skull, is a large element with a broad base lacking any brush-like processes. The parietal narrows significantly towards the top, which helps give the occipital region its conical form. The single dermosuproccipital bone is built in a similar manner, broad at its base and narrowing towards the top, where it ends in a broad and flat surface. Its surface is covered in the same marked ridges as the frontal bone. The flat surface that tops the dermosuproccipital is the attachment point for the characteristic nuchal horn of Congopycnodus. It is straight and short, showing no signs of any spines or denticles. It is however covered in a series of long and thin crests which house alveoli in the grooves between them. This clearly sets the horn of Congopycnodus apart from those of the elasmobranch Hybodus which may be found in the same strata.

== Classification ==
The conical occipital region and the size relation of its individual bones is typical for fish of the Pycnodontomorpha. It can further be determined that Congopycnodus was a member of the Pycnodontiformes rather than the Gyrodontiformes, as this taxon only possesses a single dermosuproccipital bone rather than two. The lack of brush-like processes excludes Congopycnodus from the Pycnodontidae and the presence of a horn firmly places the genus in the family Coccodontoidea, the only known horned pycnodontiforms.

However, Congopycnodus could not be placed within any of the three families that Coccodontoidea is composed off, as the details of its anatomy differ in every case. Instead, it is suggested that this genus is a morphological precursor to two of the three families, specifically the Gebrayelichthyidae and the Gladiopycnodontidae. The former group shows an overall similar skull shape, with additional deepening and overall narrowing of the occipital region as well as having possessed longer horns that were associated with the dorsal ridge scutes or dorsal fin bones. Gladiopycnodontids also elongated their horns, evolving spines along its back edge while flattening the occipital region.

In a review of freshwater pycnodont occurrences, Cawley & Kriwet (2024) noted the potential evolutionary significance of Congopycnodus, but stated that the remains were too fragmentary to even be confidently attributed to a pycnodont at all.

== Evolution and paleoenvironment ==
Congopycnodus is among the earliest pycnodontiforms known from outside of Europe. The group first appeared during the Late Triassic in what is now Austria, Italy, Belgium and Luxemburg where they remained for a while. Eventually, pycnodontiforms are known to have dispersed towards Asia, following the Asian coast and reaching Thailand by the lower Middle Jurassic. It is thought that a similar method could have led pycnodontiforms along the coast of a fracturing Gondwana, particularly the northern and eastern shores of what would later become Africa. These early Gondwanan pycnodontiforms may have expanded into the breaks that had begun to separate the continent and from there entered the river systems to arrive in the lake that then covered the region around present-day Kisangani. This renders Congopycnodus among the few known freshwater pycnodontiforms, as the family is primarily known to have inhabited marine environments such as reefs.

The Stanleyville Formation was initially thought to be Middle Jurassic in the age, but is now thought to be slightly later (Kimmeridgian) in age, and potentially as late as the Valanginian. It has been disputed over whether this formation represents a large freshwater system or even an early marine incursion into the Congo Basin (which would fit the marine habitats that coccodontoids are otherwise known from), although most recent studies favor the former explanation.
