= Tahnaichthys =

Tahnaichthys Temporal range: Albian

Scientific classification
- Kingdom: Animalia
- Phylum: Chordata
- Class: Actinopterygii
- Order: †Pycnodontiformes
- Family: †Pycnodontidae
- Genus: †Tahnaichthys
- Species: †T. magnuserrata

Binomial name
- †Tahnaichthys magnuserrata Pacheco-Ordaz et al., 2025

Extinct genus of fishes

Tahnaichthys is an extinct genus of pycnodontid that lived during the Albian stage of the Early Cretaceous epoch.

== Distribution ==
Tahnaichythys magnuserrata is known from the Tlayúa Quarry, a site belonging to the Tlayúa Formation of Puebla, Mexico.
