= Neomesturus =

Neomesturus Temporal range: Late early-Middle Turonian, 93.9–91.9 Ma

Scientific classification
- Kingdom: Animalia
- Phylum: Chordata
- Class: Actinopterygii
- Order: †Pycnodontiformes
- Family: †Pycnodontidae
- Subfamily: †Nursalliinae (?)
- Genus: †Neomesturus; Cooper & Martill, 2020

Type species
- N. asflaensis Cooper & Martill, 2020

Extinct genus of fishes

Neomesturus is an extinct genus of pycnodont tentatively assigned to the family Pycnodontidae from Morocco. Remains of the fish are only known from the Turonian assemblage of the Akrabou Formation with this material coming in the form of two isolated vomers with mostly complete to complete dental series. The dentition was similar with the Jurassic genus Mesturus, though these fish are not believed to be related, instead being a case of convergent evolution. The outer tooth rows of the fish possessed cutting edges which have been suggested to have been in service of a durophagous lifestyle. The assemblage that Neomesturus is from, referred to as the Goulmima assemblage, is known for its diverse assemblage of pelagic predators such as ichthyodectiforms and plesiosaurs. There is one species currently recognized: N. asflaensis.

== History and Classification ==
The genus Neomesturus is known from two specimens, both of which were originally found by local fossil collectors who collected from the fossils from the Asfla fossil mines located in southeast Morocco. These specimens were obtained between December 2017 and January 2020 and have since been a part of the collection at the London Natural History Museum. Before the description paper, a 2020 publication by Samuel L.A. Cooper and David M. Martill, pycnodonts were very poorly known from the Akrabou Formation with the only mention coming from a couple of papers. The specimens in these papers were described as being isolated teeth either found as gut contents within another animal or within coprolites.

The name Neomesturus derives from the Ancient Greek word "neo" which translates to "new" in combination with the name of another genus of pycnodont, Mesturus, due to the very similar dental arrangement. The species name "asflaensis" on the other hand comes from Asfla, the name of the village where the holotype was originally collected from.

=== Classification ===
The dental morphology of Neomesturus is very similar to the genus that it is named after, Mesturus, but was not assigned to the family Mesturidae by the authors of the description paper. This is not only due to the lack of certain diagnostic skeletal elements preserved for the genus but also due to its age. Due to it being from the Turonian, the authors would place the genus as a tentative member of Pycnodontidae that is just convergent to mesturids. They authors also tentatively placed the genus within Nursalliinae due to that morphology of the outermost rows of teeth showing similar morphology to taxa such as Paranursallia.

== Description ==
Neomesturus is only known from a total of two complete, medium-sized vomers with the holotype (AK-PYC 3) having a complete dental series. The bone is overall triangular in shape though thin with a maximum thickness of 3.8 millimetres (0.15 in) in comparison to the bone's length of 23 millimetres (0.91 in). The entire ascending process of the vomer is preserved with it being short but wide. The apex of the process is located towards the front of the dental palette and is asymmetrical.

The largest teeth in the dental series are located on the outmost rows, referred to as the secondary teeth, though they do decrease in size posteriorly. These teeth are slightly heterodont, though much less than what is seen in some other pycnodontids, with the first four teeth being d-shaped with a convex occlusal surface. The most notable feature of these teeth is the ridges along the edge of the teeth along with a poorly-developed cingulum that would have acted as a cutting edge. The other six teeth on the outer rows are almost spherical and lack the cutting edge seen on the first four teeth though do have the cingulum. The inner paired tooth rows, referred to as the primary rows, are the smallest teeth in the dental series and are not in as consistent of rows as the other teeth. The tooth size within these rows show no pattern though they are all between 0.3–2 millimetres (0.012–0.079 in) in diameter. These convex teeth also lack a consistent shape with them ranging from spherical to sub-elliptical in some cases. The exact shape and count of these teeth differed between individuals. The innermost teeth are made up of a single row at the midline of the vomer and increase in size posteriorly, inversely to the secondary teeth.

== Paleobiology ==
=== Paleoenvironment ===
Neomesturus is known from the Goulmima assemblage of the Akrabou Formation would have a been deep marine, outer ramp environment that most likely did not support a high diversity of microfauna. Even with this being the case there is evidence of high palaeoproductivity found in the assemblage. This difference between the environment that the foraminifera usually live and the environment that the assemblage represents could have caused the dysoxic conditions seen. Even with this being the case, a diverse assemblage of pelagic piscivorous vertebrates are known from the assemblage. One of the more notable examples of this is the large amount of juvenile specimens of Enchodus which have been suggested to be evidence of this area being a nursery for the fish. Other than Enchodus, fish such as Goulmimichthys and Kradimus are known but the assemblage is largely known from the marine reptile assemblage. A number of plesiosaurs and pliosaurs such as Thililua and Brachauchenius have been found along with the early mosasaur Tethysaurus. The fish within the assemblage show affinities towards those seen in the northern South Atlantic along with the Western Tethys. The main faunal comparison brought up when authors talk about the assemblage is similarities to assemblages from South America like the Santana assemblage in Brazil and the fauna from the Agua Nueve Formation in Mexico. Similarities with the Chalk Group from England are also brought up due to both having groups such as ichthyodectiforms and crossagnathiforms though this comparison is not brought up due to the limited overlapping faunal compositions. The pycnodonts specifically seem to have more affinities to the Tethys, specifically the western Tethys.

=== Paleoecology ===
The dentition of Neomesturus was strange for a pycnodont due to the presence of what are described as cutting edges on some of the teeth of the fish. Though similar to the teeth seen in Serrasalmimidae, the edges were much less developed which suggest that the fish were most likely not biting into soft tissue. Instead, it is suggested that Neomesturus was most likely durophagus, feeding on hard-shelled animals such as crustaceans. Durophagy is something seen in a number of other pycnodonts with hard-shelled invertebrates such as bivalves and echinoderms being found as gut contents in other genera.
