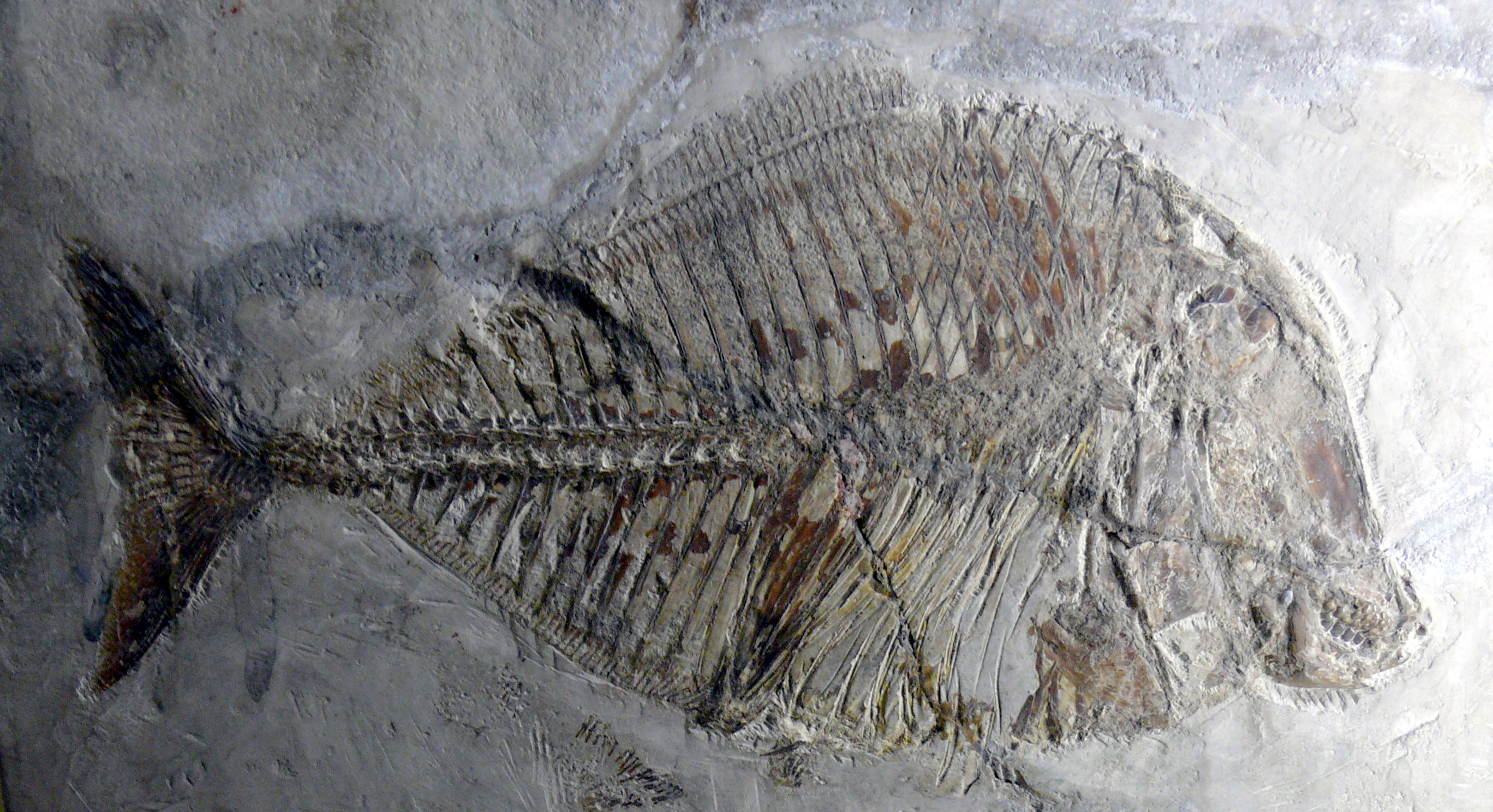
- Specimen of Pycnodus apodus

Scientific classification
- Kingdom: Animalia
- Phylum: Chordata
- Class: Actinopterygii
- Order: †Pycnodontiformes
- Family: †Pycnodontidae; Agassiz, 1835

Type genus
- †Pycnodus Agassiz, 1835

Genera
- See text

= Pycnodontidae =

Pycnodontidae Temporal range: Middle Jurassic–Priabonian

Extinct family of fishes

Pycnodontidae is an extinct family of ray-finned fishes, ranging from the Jurassic period until the Late Eocene. It was the largest and most derived family of the successful Mesozoic fish order Pycnodontiformes, and one of only two families (alongside the Serrasalmimidae) to survive into the Cenozoic.

== Genera ==
The following genera are known:

- Family Pycnodontidae Agassiz, 1835
  - Acrotemnus Agassiz, 1843 (=Macropycnodon Shimada et al., 2010)
  - ?Agassizilia Cooper & Martill, 2020
  - Agoultpycnodus Taverne & Capasso, 2021
  - Akromystax Poyato-Ariza & Wenz, 2005
  - Anomoeodus Forir, 1887
  - Apomesodon Poyato-Ariza & Wenz, 2002
  - Athrodon Sauvage, 1880
  - Brauccipycnodus Taverne & Capasso, 2021
  - Coelodus Heckel, 1854
  - Costapycnodus Taverne, Capasso & del Re, 2019
  - Gregoriopycnodus Taverne, Capasso & del Re, 2020
  - Haqelpycnodus Taverne & Capasso, 2018
  - Iemanja Wenz, 1989
  - Libanopycnodus Taverne & Capasso, 2018
  - Macromesodon Blake, 1905
  - Micropycnodon Hibbard & Graffham, 1945
  - Njoerdichthys Cawley, Lehmann, Wiese & Kriwet, 2020
  - Nonaphalagodus Thurmond, 1974
  - Ocloedus Poyato-Ariza & Wenz, 2002
  - Omphalodus von Meyer, 1847
  - Polypsephis Hay, 1899 (=Microdon Agassiz 1833 (preoccupied))
  - Potiguara Machado & Brito, 2006
  - Pycnomicrodon Hibbard and Graffham, 1941
  - Rhinopycnodus Taverne & Capasso, 2013
  - Scalacurvichthys Cawley & Kriwet, 2017
  - Sigmapycnodus Taverne & Capasso, 2018
  - Sphaerodus Agassiz, 1843
  - Stemmatodus Heckel, 1856
  - Stenamara Poyato-Ariza & Wenz, 2000
  - Tahnaichthys Pacheco-Ordaz, Mejía & Alvarado-Ortega, 2025
  - Tepexichthys Applegate, 1992
  - Texasensis Özdikmen, 2009 (=Callodus Thurmond, 1974 (preoccupied))
  - Typodus Quenstedt, 1858 (=Mesodon Wagner, 1851)
  - "Xinjiangodus" Zhou et al., 2023 (junior homonym)
  - Subfamily Proscinetinae
    - Neoproscinetes de Figueiredo & Silva Santos, 1990
    - Proscinetes Gistl, 1848
    - ?Thiollierepycnodus Ebert, 2020
    - ?Turbomesodon Poyato-Ariza & Wenz, 2004
    - Turboscinetes Ebert, 2016
  - Subfamily Nursalliinae
    - Abdobalistum Poyato-Ariza & Wenz, 2002
    - Flagellipinna Cawley & Kriwet, 2019
    - Neomesturus Cooper & Martill 2020
    - Nursallia Blot, 1987
    - Palaeobalistum Blainville 1818
    - Paranursallia Taverne et al. 2015
  - Subfamily Pycnodontinae
    - Oropycnodus Poyato-Ariza & Wenz, 2002
    - Polazzodus Poyato-Ariza 2010
    - Pycnodus Agassiz, 1835
    - Sylvienodus Poyato-Ariza, 2013
    - Tergestinia Capasso, 2000
