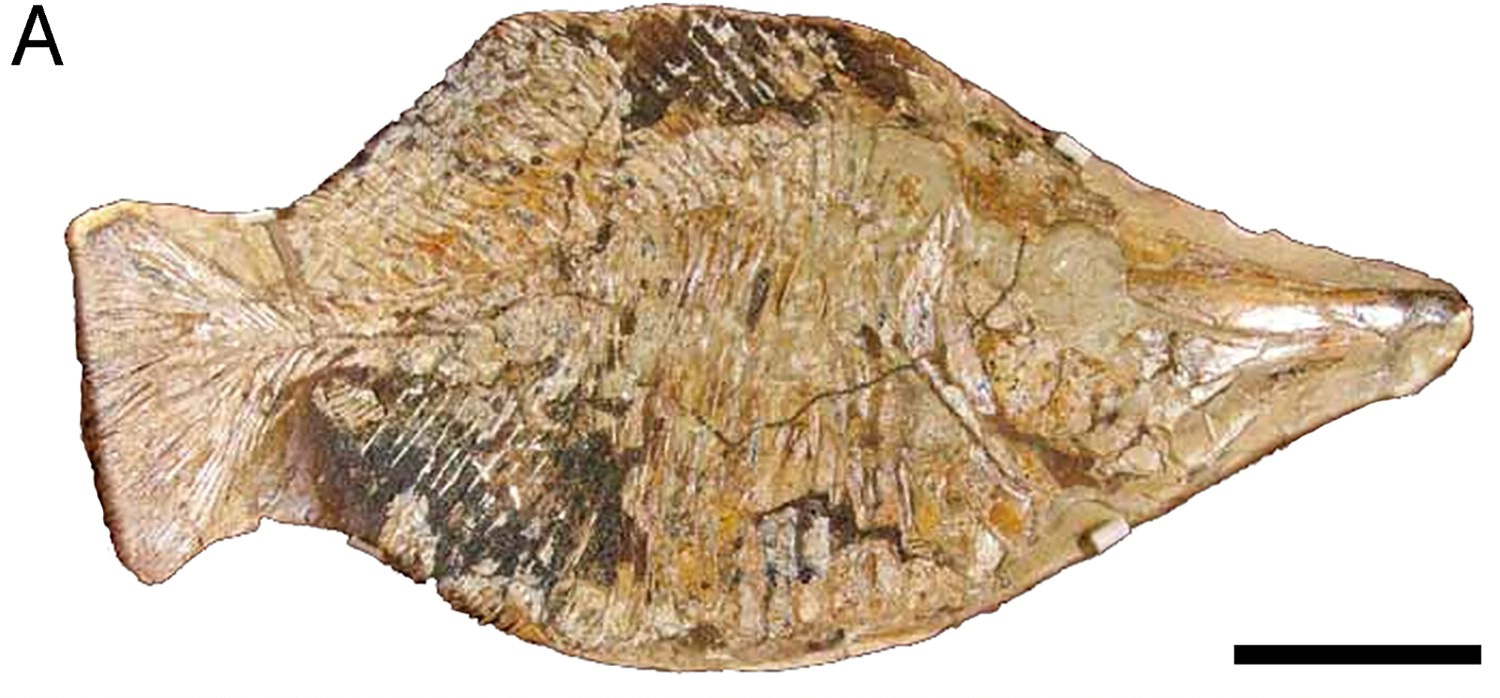
- Fossil specimen

Scientific classification
- Kingdom: Animalia
- Phylum: Chordata
- Class: Actinopterygii
- Order: †Pycnodontiformes
- Family: †Pycnodontidae
- Genus: †Iemanja
- Species: †I. palma

Binomial name
- †Iemanja palma Wenz, 1989

= Iemanja (fish) =

Iemanja Temporal range: Early Albian, 111–108 Ma

Extinct genus of fishes

Iemanja is a genus of pycnodontiform fish from the Early Cretaceous, described from the Romualdo Member (now Romualdo Formation) of the Santana Group. This genus is known from only one species, I. palma. This fish is named after Yemọja, a water spirit in Brazilian and Yoruba mythology. With length up to 60 cm (24 in), it is characterized by its long snout that is probably used to feed from crevices of reef habitats.
