= Agassizilia =

Agassizilia Temporal range: Late Albian to Campanian

Scientific classification
- Kingdom: Animalia
- Phylum: Chordata
- Class: Actinopterygii
- Order: †Pycnodontiformes
- Family: †Pycnodontidae
- Genus: †Agassizilia; Cooper and Martill, 2020

Species
- †A. erfoudina Cooper and Martill, 2020; †A. barberi (Hussakof, 1947)

Extinct genus of fishes

Agassizilia is an extinct genus of both freshwater and marine pycnodont fishes from the mid-late Cretaceous (late Albian/early Cenomanian-Campanian). The genus is named after paleontologist Louis Agassiz.

The genus contains two species: A. erfoudina from freshwater deposits of the Kem Kem Group in south-east Morocco and A. barberi from marine deposits of the US (Marlbrook Marl of Arkansas, Eutaw Formation of Alabama, and possibly the Smoky Hill Chalk of Kansas).

It was described in 2020 from an isolated prearticular bone (lower jaw) with a unique tooth arrangement on its dental pavement which differentiates it from all other known pycnodont genera. It is the first new genus of pycnodont fish to be found in the Moroccan Kem Kem Group. Although the rest of its skeleton is unknown, the pavement of blunt delicate teeth on the holotype suggests that it fed of soft shelled invertebrates such as shrimp or ostracods. It was found alongside several other typically marine pycnodont genera in a freshwater river system, suggesting a possibly amphidromous lifestyle.

Later in 2020, the species A. barberi from the US, which was previously assigned to Anomoeodus, was reclassified to Agassizilia due to it having more than four true tooth rows, much like A. erfoudina and unlike other members of Anomoeodus. A potential tooth plate of A. barberi from Kansas differs from those in other specimens of A. barberi, and has been cited as potential variation in the species; however, later studies have suggested that these differences may be due to the broken nature of the specimen.
