= Njoerdichthys =

Njoerdichthys Temporal range: Turonian

Scientific classification
- Domain: Eukaryota
- Kingdom: Animalia
- Phylum: Chordata
- Class: Actinopterygii
- Order: †Pycnodontiformes
- Family: †Pycnodontidae
- Genus: †Njoerdichthys; Cawley et al., 2020
- Species: †N. dyckerhoffi

Binomial name
- †Njoerdichthys dyckerhoffi Cawley et al., 2020

Extinct genus of pycnodontid fish

Njoerdichthys is an extinct genus of pycnodontid fish from the Cretaceous Hesseltal Formation in Germany.

== Discovery and naming ==
The original holotype of Njoerdichthys was discovered in 1995 at the abandoned Galgenknapp quarry, previously owned by the Dyckerhoff AG company, while the paratype specimens were discovered in the Hohne quarry, also owned by the company, located west of Lengerich, Germany. The specimens were found in laminated marlstones. Both quarries are part of the Late Cretaceous Hesseltal Formation. All of the specimens where collected and then prepared by Udo Resch, who is famous for his fossil preparating skills.

The name of Njoerdichthys refers to the ancient Germanic god Njörd, who, in German mythology, navegates the waters and winds, plus the Greek name "ichthyos", meaning fish. The name of the species, N. dyckerhoffi, refers to the Dyckerhoff AG company.

== Description ==
Njoerdichthys was a small fish, the holotype being 4.2 cm long. The specimens comprise skeletons more or less complete, with the holotype preserving both cranial and postcranial remains, as does the paratypes, which consists of a larger specimen and a juvenile. Despite lacking a postparietal process, phylogenetic analysis still finds it a part of the Pycnodontidae family, in the Nursalliinae subfamily.

== Paleoenvironment ==
Njoerdichthys is the most northerly pycnodontiform recorded from the Cretaceous, living in a marine environment during the early Turonian, when temperatures peaked their highest during the Mesozoic. This, with the discovery of Anomoedus in Sweden, is additional evidence to pycnodontids having expanded into higher latitudes with the warming of the climate and that climate played a crucial role in their expansion.
