= Tibetodus =

Tibetodus Temporal range: Late Jurassic

Scientific classification
- Domain: Eukaryota
- Kingdom: Animalia
- Phylum: Chordata
- Class: Actinopterygii
- Order: †Pycnodontiformes
- Genus: †Tibetodus; Young & Liu, 1954

Extinct genus of fishes

Tibetodus is an extinct genus of prehistoric ray-finned fish that lived during the Late Jurassic epoch.

== See also ==
- Prehistoric fish
- List of prehistoric bony fish
