= Athrodon =

Athrodon Temporal range: Kimmeridgian–Berriasian Possible Cenomanian records

Scientific classification
- Kingdom: Animalia
- Phylum: Chordata
- Class: Actinopterygii
- Order: †Pycnodontiformes
- Family: †Pycnodontidae
- Genus: †Athrodon; Sauvage, 1880

Type species
- †Athrodon douvillei Sauvage, 1880

Species
- See text

Synonyms
- Mesodon profusidens Gaudry et al 1890; Mesodon wittei Frick 1875

Extinct genus of fishes

Athrodon is an extinct genus of marine pycnodontid fish that lived in shallow seas in what is now England, Germany, Spain and France from the Late Jurassic until the genus' extinction during the start of the late Cretaceous. The various species are very similar in splenial bone and tooth morphology to the disused genus Mesodon. Otherwise, no articulated or complete specimen is known: all fossil specimens are bone fragments and disarticulated teeth. This genus is thought to be diagnosed by the presence of four lateral tooth rows. The presence of this genus in the Cretaceous is disputed, as the remains of Cretaceous species could belong to other genera.

The following species are known:

- A. boloniensis Sauvage, 1880 - Kimmeridgian of France (Boulogne)
- ?A. crassus Woodward, 1893 - Cenomanian of England (Cambridge Greensand)
- A. douvillei Sauvage, 1880 (type species) - late Tithonian of France (Boulogne)
- A. intermedius Woodward, 1893 - Berriasian of England (Purbeck Group)
- ?A. jessoni Woodward, 1895 - Cenomanian of England (Cambridge Greensand)
- ?A. profusidens (Cornuel, 1886) - Early Cretaceous of France
- A. wittei (Sauvage, 1880) - Kimmeridgian of northern Germany

The Late Cretaceous species A. tenuis Woodward, 1893 from the later Cretaceous of Belgium is more likely a specimen of Anomoeodus.

== See also ==
- Prehistoric fish
- List of prehistoric bony fish
