= Polazzodus =

Polazzodus Temporal range: Santonian

Scientific classification
- Kingdom: Animalia
- Phylum: Chordata
- Class: Actinopterygii
- Order: †Pycnodontiformes
- Family: †Pycnodontidae
- Genus: †Polazzodus; Poyoto-Ariza, 2010

Species
- P. coronatus

Extinct genus of fishes

Polazzodus is an extinct pycnodontid from the Late Cretaceous (early Santonian) of the Polazzo locality of north-eastern Italy. The paleoenvironment of Polazzo was a large marine carbonate platform and shallow internal lagoons formed from rudist reefs. P. coronatus is known from numerous specimens, many of which were very well-preserved.

The new genus Polazzodus was erected based on a number of autapomorphies that distinguished it from similar pycnodontid fish. These include a second dorsal ridge scale (from which the Latin species name, coronatus, is derived), presence of olfactory fenestra on premaxilla, posterodorsal process on cleithrum, and several others. The largest measured recovered specimen was 97 mm (3.8 in), and the smallest was 30 mm (1.2 in), which represented a subadult specimen. Polazzodus, being a low-bodied pycnodont, is most similar morphologically to Pycnodus and Tergestrinia, though its body shape is more oval than these genera.

== Palaeobiology ==
=== Diet ===
Polazzodus was adapted for predating on small prey items in crevasses and burrows in environments such as coral reefs, using its elongated rostrum to reach inside them and hunt small invertebrates inaccessible to other pycnodonts.
