= Nimar Sandstone Formation =

Geologic formation in India

- Stratigraphic range: Late Cretaceous, Cenomanian
- Type: Geological formation
- Underlies: N/A
- Overlies: N/A

Location
- Coordinates: 22.4° N, 74.8° E
- Region: Madhya Pradesh
- Country: India
- Nimar Sandstone Formation (India)

Nimar Sandstone Formation is a geological formation from the Cenomanian of India.

== Paleobiota ==
=== Dinosaurs ===
Genus	Species	Material	Notes	Photos
Titanosauria	Indeterminate	Partial Skeleton Including a femur, humerus, radius, ulna and numerous fragmentary bones belonging at least to two individuals	A new titanosaur species, possibly ancestral to the titanosaurs known from abundant remains from the Lameta Formation of peninsular India.	
Dinosauria	Indeterminate	"Fragmentary pieces of bones"	Too poorly preserved to identify.	

=== Fishes ===
Genus	Species	Material	Notes
Coelodus	C. malwaensis		
Onchopristis	O. indicus		

=== Mollusca ===
Genus	Species	Material	Notes
Ostreidae	Indeterminate		
