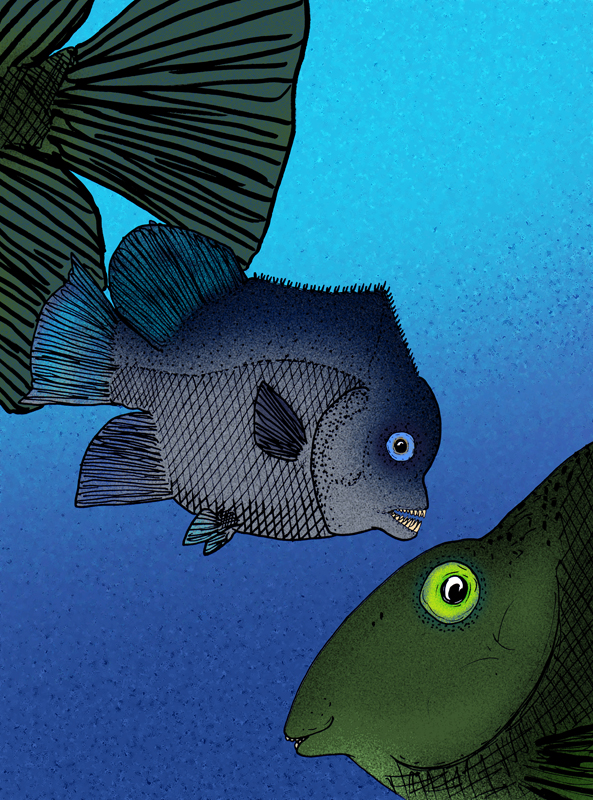

Scientific classification
- Domain: Eukaryota
- Kingdom: Animalia
- Phylum: Chordata
- Class: Actinopterygii
- Order: †Pycnodontiformes
- Genus: †Piranhamesodon; Kölbl-Ebert et al., 2018

Type species
- † P. pinnamotus Kölbl-Ebert et al., 2018

= Piranhamesodon =

Piranhamesodon Temporal range: Late Jurassic, 152 Ma

Extinct genus of fishes

Piranhamesodon pinnatomus is a pycnodontiform fish from the Late Jurassic (ca. 152 million years old). It was described from the Plattenkalk deposits of the Solnhofen Formation, in Bavaria, Germany. It is notable for having sharp, serrated teeth highly reminiscent of a piranha, a highly unusual trait as most other species in the order Pycnodontiformes were shellfish eaters with flat, crushing teeth. It is also the oldest known bony fish with this trait. This unusual combination is reflected in its genus name, which is a combination of piranha and the frequent pycnodontiform genus suffix Mesodon. Fossils of other fish found in the same area have torn fins possibly attributable to this species.

== See also ==
- Prehistoric fish
- List of prehistoric bony fish
