= Polygyrodus =

Polygyrodus Temporal range: Late Cretaceous

Scientific classification
- Domain: Eukaryota
- Kingdom: Animalia
- Phylum: Chordata
- Class: Actinopterygii
- Order: †Pycnodontiformes
- Genus: †Polygyrodus; White, 1927

Extinct genus of fishes

Polygyrodus is an extinct genus of prehistoric ray-finned fish that lived during the Late Cretaceous epoch. The name is a combination of the Greek words poly (many), gyro (round), and odoy (tooth).

== See also ==
- Prehistoric fish
- List of prehistoric bony fish
