= Paranursallia =

Paranursallia Temporal range: Late Cretaceous (Cenomanian to Turonian), 95–90 Ma
- Fossil vomer from the Akrabou Formation

Scientific classification
- Kingdom: Animalia
- Phylum: Chordata
- Class: Actinopterygii
- Order: †Pycnodontiformes
- Genus: †Paranursallia; Taverne et al., 2015

Extinct genus of fishes

Paranursallia is an extinct genus of nursalline pycnodont fish that lived during the Late Cretaceous epoch.

== Distribution ==
Fossilised remains of Paranursallia spinosa are known from Tunisia, while those of Paranursallia gutturosa are known from Mexico, Italy, and Morocco.

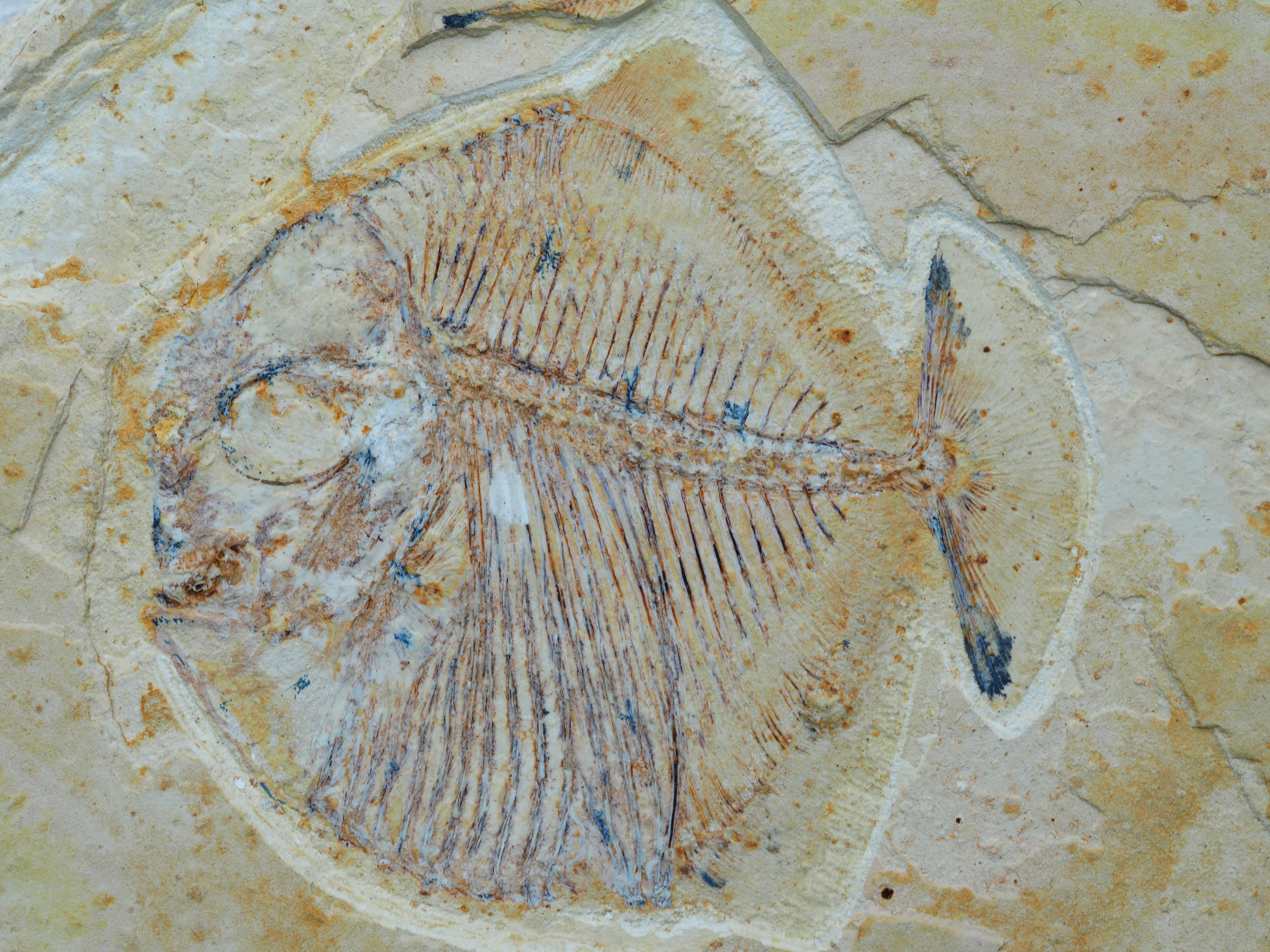
Paranursallia gutturosa (Arambourg, 1854), Late Cretaceous, Akrabou Fm., Gara es Sbaa, Morocco
