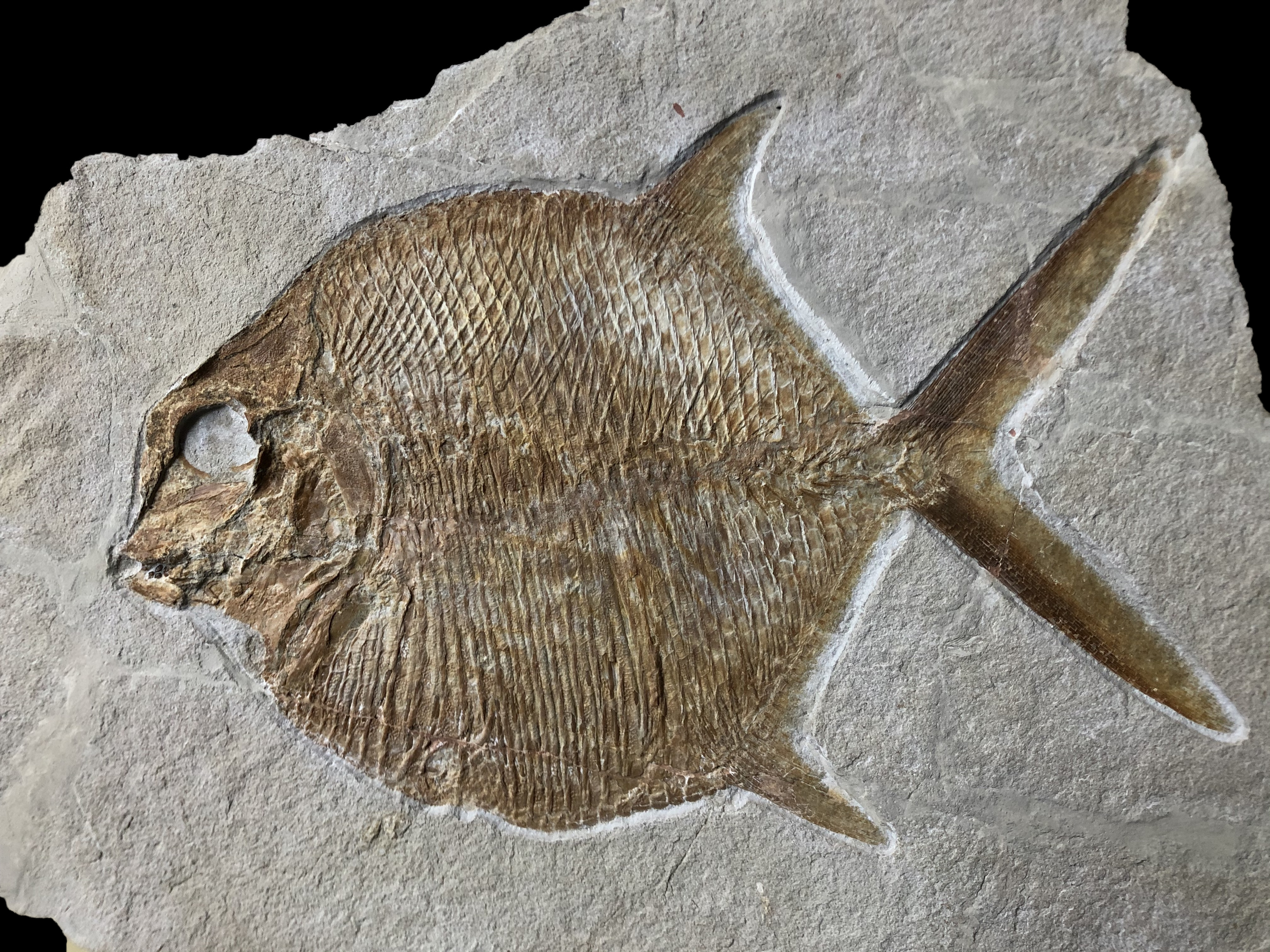
- Specimen of G. circularis

Scientific classification
- Kingdom: Animalia
- Phylum: Chordata
- Class: Actinopterygii
- Order: †Gyrodontiformes
- Family: †Gyrodontidae; Berg, 1940
- Genus: †Gyrodus; Agassiz, 1833

Species
- See text

= Gyrodus =

Gyrodus Temporal range: Middle Jurassic (Bajocian) to Early Cretaceous (Aptian)

Extinct genus of fishes

Gyrodus (from Greek: γύρος gyros, 'curved' and Greek: ὀδούς odoús 'tooth') is an extinct genus of marine pycnodontomorph ray-finned fish that lived from the Middle Jurassic (Bajocian) to the Early Cretaceous (Aptian). It is the only member of the family Gyrodontidae.

With a stratigraphic range from the middle Jurassic to the early-mid Cretaceous, it was one of the longest-surviving and most successful pycnodont genera. It was most abundant in Europe during the Late Jurassic, and was also found off the coast of East Asia and southern regions of the Americas. It saw a precipitous decline in abundance at the start of the Cretaceous, and only a few remains are known from parts of Europe and South America from this period.

== Taxonomy ==
Gyrodus is the only member of the pycnodont family Gyrodontidae, which can be distinguished by certain traits such as a depressed pit in the occlusal surface of the teeth, and four dentary teeth. The sister group to this family is thought to be the hypercarnivorous Serrasalmimidae, of which one genus (Polygyrodus) was previously placed in the Gyrodontidae.

The following species are known:

- †G. circularis Agassiz, 1834 - Late Jurassic (Kimmeridgian to Tithonian) of Germany (Nusplingen Limestone & Solnhofen Formation)
- †G. hexagonus (de Blainville, 1818) - Middle Jurassic (Oxfordian) of Cuba (Jagua Formation, ssp. cubensis Gregory, 1923), Tithonian of Germany (Solnhofen Formation) (=G. macrophthalmus)
- †G. huiliches Gouiric-Cavalli, Remírez & Kriwet, 2019 - early Valanginian to early Hauterivian of Neuquen, Argentina

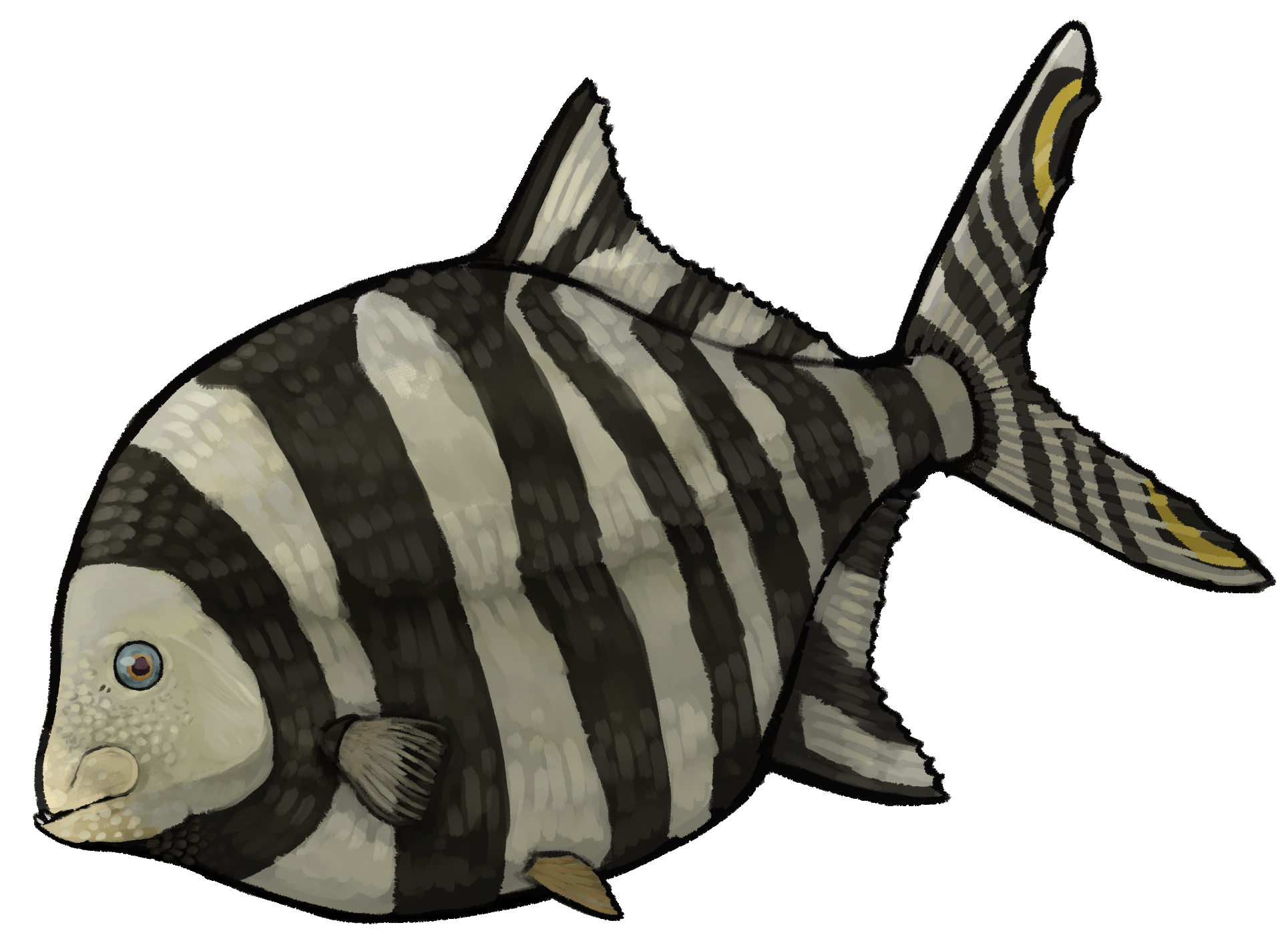
Life restoration of G. hexagonus

In the past, many other species were known, but almost all were synonymized with G. circularis and G. hexagonus. The earliest definite record of Gyrodus is from the Middle Jurassic (Bajocian) of Scotland, which was initially assigned to the species G. goweri, but is likely too fragmentary for a species description. They become much more common during the Late Jurassic, and fossils of Gyrodus are common throughout Europe, including France (including the Cerin Lagerstatte), Germany, Switzerland (Reuchenette Formation), Italy, and Spain. From the Americas, it is known from the Late Jurassic of Chile and the Kimmeridgian of Mexico. In Asia, it is known from the Tithonian of Japan and Siberia.

During the Early Cretaceous, indeterminate Gyrodus remains are known from the Barremian & Hauterivian of Germany, with the final known record of Gyrodus being remains assigned to the species "G. minor" from the Aptian of England.

== Palaeobiology ==
Dental microwear indicates that Gyrodus planidens closed its jaw in a propalinal motion with the prearticular shearing against the vomer during the powerstroke rather than through purely vertical jaw movement.
