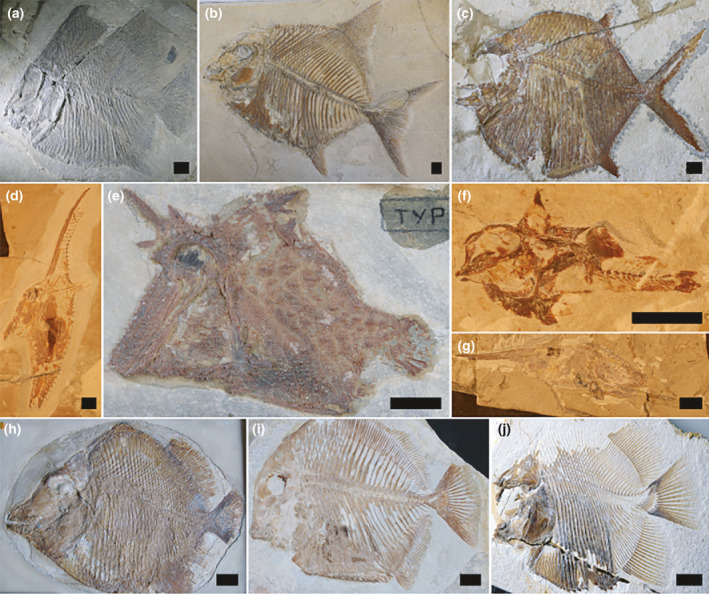
- Pycnodontiform diversity

Scientific classification
- Kingdom: Animalia
- Phylum: Chordata
- Class: Actinopterygii
- Superorder: †Pycnodontomorpha
- Order: †Pycnodontiformes; Berg, 1937

Families
- Brembodontidae; Coccodontidae; Gebrayelichthyidae; Gladiopycnodontidae; Hadrodontidae; Pycnodontidae

= Pycnodontiformes =

Pycnodontiformes Temporal range: Late Triassic–Eocene

Extinct order of fishes

Pycnodontiformes (sometimes included inside a larger superorder, Pycnodontomorpha) is an extinct order of primarily marine bony fish. The group first appeared during the Late Triassic and disappeared during the Eocene. The group has been found in rock formations in Africa, Asia, Europe, North and South America.

They were small to middle-sized fish, generally with laterally-compressed deep bodies, some with almost circular outlines, adapted for manoeuvrability in reef-like environments, though the group was morphologically diverse. Most, but not all members of the groups had jaws with round and flattened teeth, well adapted to crush food items (durophagy), such as echinoderms, crustaceans and molluscs. Some pycnodontiformes developed piranha like teeth used for eating flesh. Most species inhabited shallow marine reef environments, while a handful of species lived in freshwater or brackish conditions.

While rare during the Triassic and Early-Middle Jurassic, Pycnodontiformes became abundant and diverse during the Late Jurassic, exhibiting a high but relatively static diversity during the Early Cretaceous. At the beginning of the Late Cretaceous they reached their apex of morphological and species diversity (much of this due to fossils found in the Sannine Formation of Lebanon, such as Gebrayelichthyidae and Ichthyoceros), after which they began to gradually decline, with a more sudden decline at the end of the Cretaceous due to the collapse of reef ecosystems, finally becoming extinct during the Eocene. They are considered to belong to the Neopterygii, but their relationship to other members of that group is uncertain.

== Evolution and diversity ==
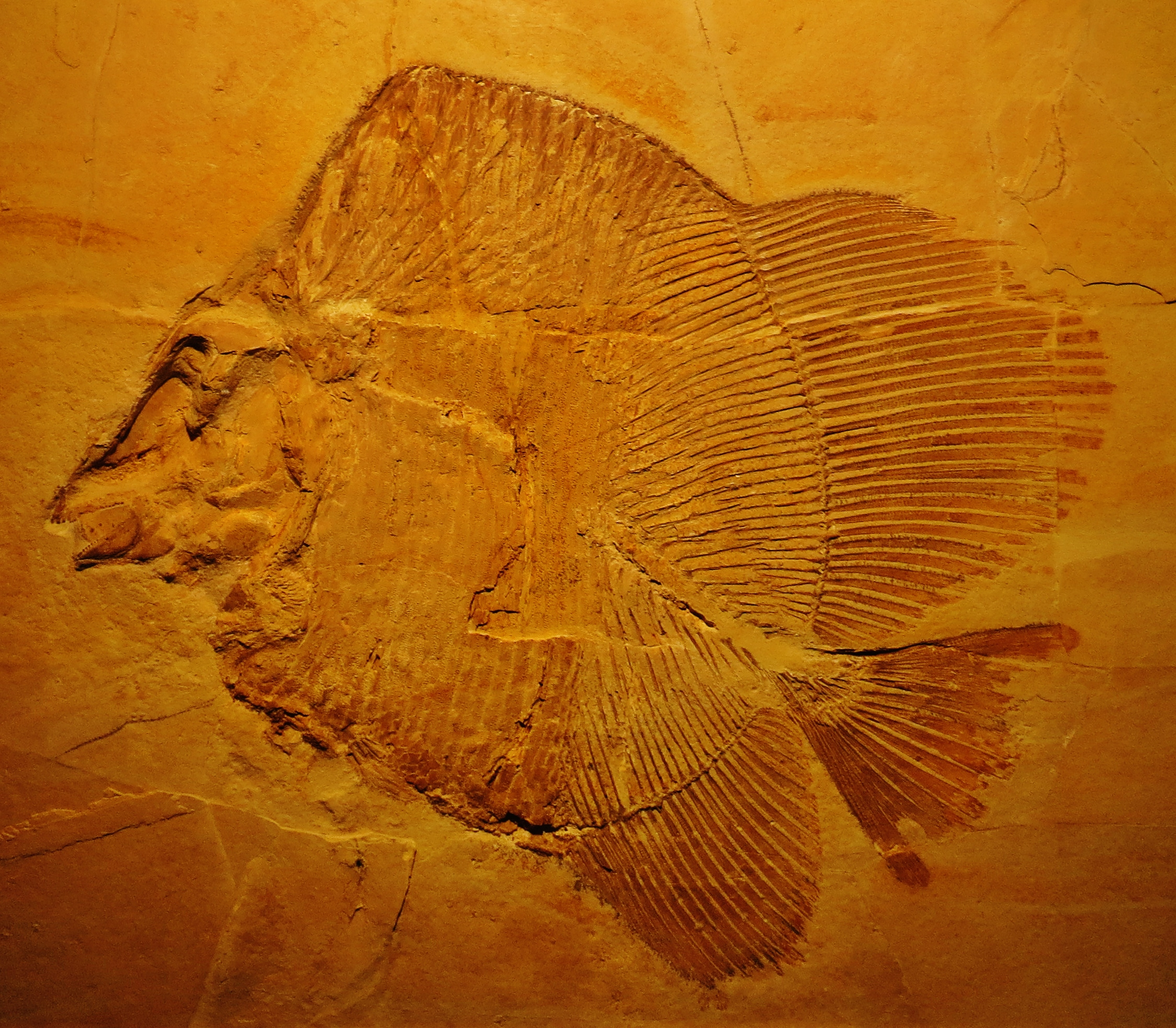
Macromesodon gibbosus (formerly species of Eomesodon), a species of Brembodontidae from the Jurassic Solnhofen Limestone.

Pycnodontiforms first appeared in the Late Triassic, alongside other successful groups of early neopterygians such as dapediiforms. The oldest pycnodont known from articulated skeletons is Valgarzaella antiquissima (lower Norian Dolomie Zonate Formation, Garza Valley, Brescia, northern Italy). A contributor for this early radiation of neopterygians was their effectiveness at adapting to different diets. Pycnodonts from the Upper Triassic Zorzino Limestone in Italy had short and stout jaws with big crushing teeth for eating hard-shelled prey, while other actinopterygians like saurichthyids and birgeriids mainly occupied top predator piscivorous niches. They originated from marine habitats, specializing for manoeuverability in reef environments, but developed a variety of adaptations during the Mesozoic that enable them to pursue new diets and habitats, such as estuaries and freshwaters. Only a few species adapted for open waters, like those of the family Gyrodontidae. In the Western Tethys, pycnodonts have always had a high species diversity. This stable environment, alongside its favorable climate conditions, supported the dispersal patterns within basal pycnodontids.

They evolved such different jaw structures to avoid potential competition with other groups of durophagous neopterygians, such as the Dapediiformes and the Ginglymodi. Furthermore, their improved jaw performance also differentiated the pycnodonts from these neopterygians in that they allowed them to feed on tougher prey, while their increase in size allowed them to prey on larger items or specialise on a few species. Their families also differentiated amongst themselves in body and jaw shape, implying that they were more diverse in diet and habitat than previously thought.

The fossil record of pycnodonts spans 175 million years, from the Triassic to the Eocene, existing longer than non-avian dinosaurs. Their early record is incomplete, having only three genera from the Late Triassic, all with complete specimens. Whereas from the Early to Mid-Jurassic there are only isolated teeth and jaws, and rarely a few exceptions for better, but still incomplete, fossils. By the Late Jurassic Pycnodontiforms became more common in the fossil record, a fact that relates to the presence of Lagerstätten, providing articulated fossils. This growth continues and, by the Late Cretaceous, they experience a peak in diversity during the Cenomanian. They were severely struck by the K/Pg Extinction and afterwards their diversity shrunk, having never achieved pre-extinction levels of diversity, eventually going extinct by the Late Eocene (Priabonian).

== Taxonomy ==
- OPTION A
  - Superorder †Pycnodontomorpha Nursall, 2010
  - Order †Gyrodontiformes Nursall, 2010
    - Family †Valgarzaellidae Capasso et al., 2026
      - Genus Valgarzaella Capasso et al., 2026
    - Family †Gyrodontidae Berg, 1940
      - Genus Gyrodus Agassiz, 1833
    - Family †Mesturidae Nursall, 1996
      - Genus Aminiichthys Ebert, 2026
      - Genus Arduafrons Frickhinger, 1991
      - Genus Goodichthys Ebert, 2026
      - Genus Mesturus Wagner, 1862
      - Genus Micropycnodon Hibbard and Graffham, 1945
      - Genus Paramesturus Taverne, 1981
  - Order †Pycnodontiformes Berg, 1937
    - Family †Brembodontidae Tintori, 1981
    - Family †Pycnodontidae Agassiz, 1833
    - Family †Serrasalmimidae Vullo et al., 2017
    - Superfamily Coccodontoidea Taverne & Capasso, 2013
    - Additional families (Hadrodontidae, Macromesodontidae, etc.)
- OPTION B (The currently most accepted)
  - Order Pycnodontiformes (Berg, 1937)
    - Genus ?Acrorhinichthys Taverne & Capasso, 2015
    - Genus ?Archaeopycnodon Sanchez & Benedetto, 1980
    - Genus Arduafrons Frickhinger, 1991
    - Genus ?Athrodon le Sauvage 1880 non Osborn, 1887
    - Genus ?Callodus Thurmond, 1974
    - Genus ?Ellipsodus Cornuel, 1877
    - Genus ?Grypodon Hay, 1899 [Ancistrodon Dames, 1883 non De Beauvois, 1799 non Roemer, 1852 non Wagler, 1830]
    - Genus ?Mercediella Koerber, 2012 [Camposichthys Figueiredo & Silva-Santos, 1991 non Travassos, 1946 non Whitley, 1953]
    - Genus Paramesturus Taverne, 1981
    - Genus ?Piranhamesodon Kölbl-Ebert et al., 2018
    - Genus ?Pseudopycnodus Taverne, 2003
    - Genus ?Tergestinia Capasso, 2000
    - Genus ?Thurmondella Thurmond, 1974 non [Paramicrodon Thurmond, 1974 non de Meijere, 1913]
    - Genus ?Uranoplosus le Sauvage, 1879
    - Genus ?Woodthropea Swinnerton, 1925
    - Family Brembodontidae Tintori, 1981 [Brembodidae; Gibbodontidae Tintori, 1981]
      - Genus Brembodus Tintori, 1981
      - Genus Eomesodon Woodward, 1918
      - Genus Gibbodon Tintori, 1981
    - Family †Valgarzaellidae Capasso et al., 2026
      - Genus Valgarzaella Capasso et al., 2026
    - Family †Gyrodontidae Berg, 1940
      - Genus Gyrodus Agassiz, 1833
    - Family †Mesturidae Nursall, 1996
      - Genus Aminiichthys Ebert, 2026
      - Genus Arduafrons Frickhinger, 1991
      - Genus Mesturus Wagner, 1862
      - Genus Micropycnodon Hibbard and Graffham, 1945
      - Genus Paramesturus Taverne, 198
    - Family ?Hadrodontidae Thurmond & Jones, 1981
      - Genus Hadrodus Leidy, 1858 [Propenser Applegate, 1970]
    - Family Macromesodontidae
      - Genus Macromesodon Blake 1905 non Lehman, 1966 [Mesodon Wagner, 1851 non Rafinesque, 1821; Gyronchus Agassiz, 1839; Apomesodon Poyato-Ariza & Wenz, 2002]
    - Family Pycnodontidae Agassiz, 1833 corrig. Bonaparte, 1845 [Nursalliidae Bloy, 1987; Sphaerodontidae Giebel, 1846; Palaeobalistidae Blot, 1987; Proscinetidae Gistel, 1848; Gyronchidae]
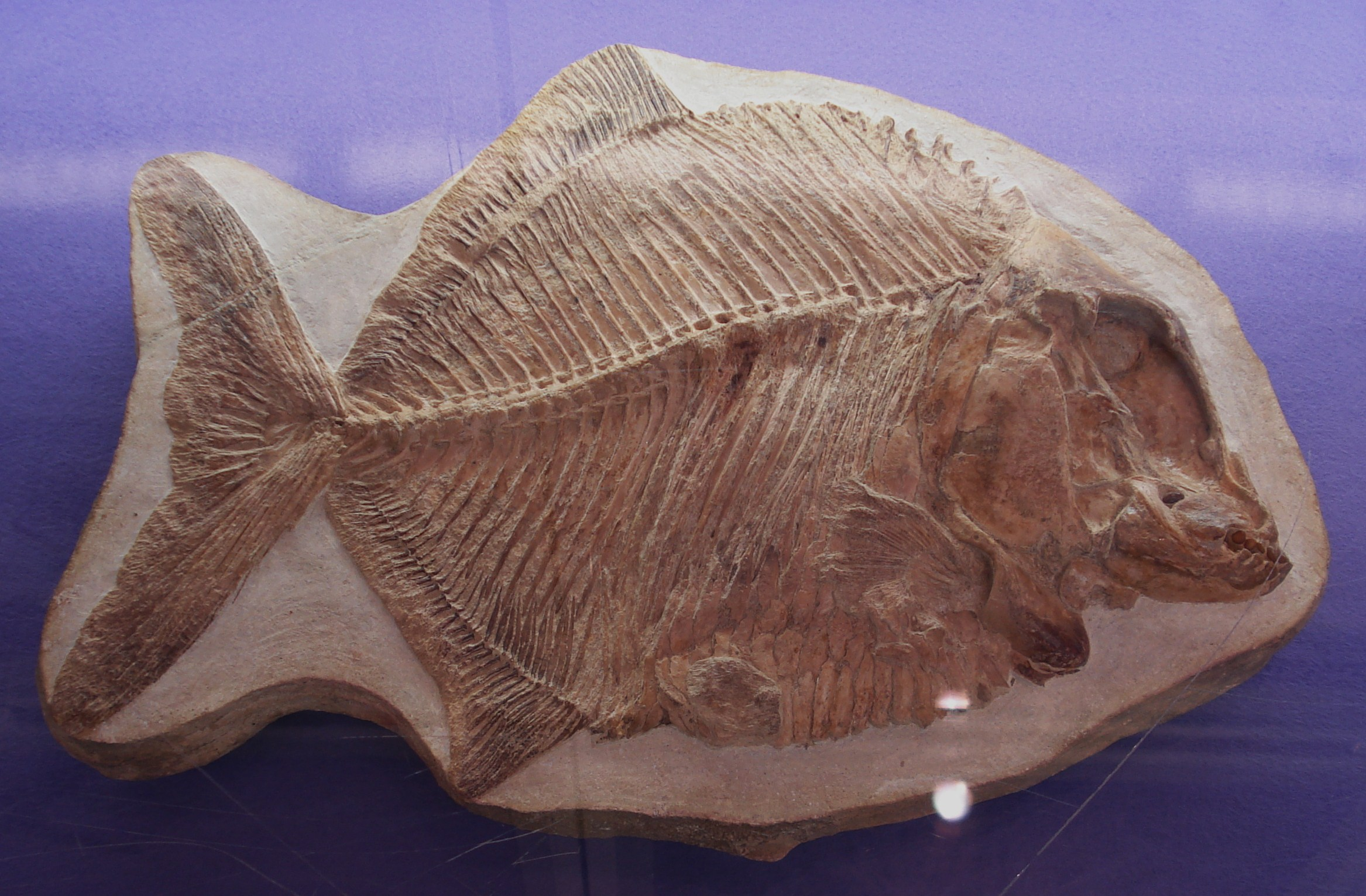
      Fossil of Neoproscinetes penalvai
      - Genus Abdobalistum Poyato-Ariza & Wenz, 2002
      - Genus Acrotemnus Agassiz, 1843 (=Macropycnodon Shimada, Williamson & Sealey, 2010)
      - Genus ?Agassizilia Cooper & Martill, 2020
      - Genus Agoultpycnodus Taverne & Capasso, 2021
      - Genus Akromystax Poyato-Ariza & Wenz, 2005
      - Genus Anomiophthalmus Costa, 1856
      - Genus Anomoeodus Forir, 1887
      - Genus Apomesodon Poyato-Ariza & Wenz, 2002
      - Genus Athrodon Sauvage, 1880
      - Genus Brauccipycnodus Taverne & Capasso, 2021
      - Genus Coelodus Heckel, 1854
      - Genus Costapycnodus Taverne, Capasso & del Re, 2019
      - Genus Flagellipinna Cawley & Kriwet, 2019
      - Genus Gregoriopycnodus Taverne, Capasso & del Re, 2020
      - Genus Haqelpycnodus Taverne & Capasso, 2018
      - Genus Iemanja Wenz, 1989
      - Genus Libanopycnodus Taverne & Capasso, 2018
      - Genus Micropycnodon Hibbard & Graffham, 1945
      - Genus ?Neomesturus Cooper & Martill 2020
      - Genus Neoproscinetes De Figueiredo & Silva Santos, 1990
      - Genus Njoerdichthys Cawley, Lehmann, Wiese & Kriwet, 2020
      - Genus Nonaphalagodus Thurmond, 1974
      - Genus Nursallia Blot, 1987
      - Genus Ocloedus Poyato-Ariza & Wenz, 2002
      - Genus Omphalodus von Meyer, 1847
      - Genus Oropycnodus Poyato-Ariza & Wenz, 2002
      - Genus Palaeobalistum Taverne et al., 2015
      - Genus Paranursallia Taverne et al., 2015
      - ?Genus Phacodus Dixon, 1850
      - Genus Polazzodus Poyoto-Ariza, 2010
      - Genus Polypsephis Hay, 1899 (=Microdon Agassiz 1833 (preoccupied))
      - Genus Potiguara Machado & Brito, 2006
      - Genus Proscinetes Gistl, 1848 [Microdon Agassiz, 1833 non Meigen, 1803 non Fritsch, 1876 non Conrad, 1842 non Gistl, 1848 non Dixon, 1850; Polypsephis Hay, 1899]
      - Genus Pycnodus Agassiz, 1833
      - Genus Pycnomicrodon Hay 1916 non Hibbard & Graffham, 1941
      - Genus Rhinopycnodus Taverne & Capasso, 2013
      - Genus Scalacurvichthys Cawley & Kriwet, 2017
      - Genus Sigmapycnodus Taverne & Capasso, 2018
      - Genus Sphaerodus Agassiz, 1833
      - Genus Sphaeronchus Stinton & Torrens, 1967
      - Genus Stenamara Poyato-Ariza & Wenz, 2000
      - Genus Stemmatias Hay, 1899 [Stemmatodus St. John & Worthen, 1875 non Heckel, 1854 non]
      - Genus Stemmatodus Heckel, 1854 non St. John & Worthen, 1875 non
      - Genus Sylvienodus Poyato-Ariza & Wenz, 2013
        Life Reconstruction of Thiollierepycnodus wagneri
      - Genus Tepexichthys Applegate, 1992
      - Genus Tergestinia Capasso, 2000
      - Genus Texasensis Özdikmen, 2009 (=Callodus Thurmond, 1974 (preoccupied))
      - Genus Thiollierepycnodus Ebert, 2020
      - Genus Tibetodus Young & Liu, 1954
      - Genus Turbomesodon Poyato-Ariza & Wenz, 2004 [Macromesodon Lehman, 1966 non Blake, 1905]
      - Genus Typodus Quenstedt, 1858
    - Family Serrasalmimidae Vullo et al, 2017
      - Genus Eoserrasalmimus Vullo et al, 2017
      - Genus Damergouia Vullo et al, 2017
      - Genus Polygyrodus White, 1927
      - Genus Serrasalmimus Vullo et al, 2017
    - Superfamily Coccodontoidea Taverne & Capasso, 2013
      - Genus Congopycnodus Taverne, 2019
      - Family Stanhopellidae Capasso, 2023
        - Genus Stanhopella Capasso, 2023
      - Family Coccodontidae Berg, 1940
        - Genus Coccodus Pictet, 1850
        - Genus Corusichthys Taverne & Capasso, 2014
        - Genus ?Cosmodus le Sauvage, 1879 [Glossodus Costa, 1851 non Agassiz, 1828 ex Spix & Agassiz, 1829 non McCoy, 1848]
        - Genus Hensodon Kriwet, 2004
        - Genus Ichthyoceros Gayet, 1984
        - Genus Paracoccodus Taverne & Capasso, 2014
        - Genus Trewavasia White & Moy-Thomas, 1941 [Xenopholis Davis, 1887 non Peters, 1869; Xenopholoides Fowler, 1958]
      - Family Gebrayelichthyidae Nursall & Capasso, 2004
        - Genus Gebrayelichthys Nursall & Capasso, 2004
        - Genus Maraldichthys Taverne & Capasso, 2014
      - Family Gladiopycnodontidae Taverne & Capasso, 2013
        - Genus Ducrotayichthys Taverne & Capasso, 2015
        - Genus Gladiopycnodus Taverne & Capasso, 2013
        - Genus Hayolperichthys Taverne & Capasso, 2015
        - Genus Joinvillichthys Taverne & Capasso, 2014
        - Genus Monocerichthys Taverne & Capasso, 2013
        - Genus Pankowskichthys Taverne & Capasso, 2014
        - Genus Rostropycnodus Taverne & Capasso, 2013
        - Genus Stenoprotome Hay, 1903
        - Genus Tricerichthys Taverne & Capasso, 2015

== Phylogeny ==
The phylogenetic relation between pycnodonts and other actinopterygians is uncertain. The difficulty of placing them on a phylogenetic tree arises from the fact that they are a clade defined by a high number of autapomorphies (characteristics shared by a single taxon), which makes them easy to identify, but also makes the study of their relations with other actinopterygians difficult, since characteristics shared by other groups might be obfuscated by the immense amount of features and diversity of pycnodonts.

Previously, Pycnodontiformes where proposed to be a sister group of Teleostei or Teleosteomorpha, but in a 2015 analysis by Poyato-Ariza, they turned up as the most basal Neopterygii among the others of the group included, those being Lepisosteiformes, Semionotiformes, Macrosemiiformes, Halecomorphi and Teleostei.

- Actinopterygii
  - - Cladistia
      Polypterus
  - - - Chondrostei
        Acipenser
    - Neopterygii
      - †Pycnodontiformes
      - Halecosmoti
        - Holostei
          - Halecomorpha
            - †Caturus
            - †Ionoscopus
            - - Amia
              - †Calamopleurus
          - Ginglymodi
            - †Macrosemiiformes
              †Macrosemius
            - Lepisosteiformes
              - †Semionotiformes
                †Semionotus
              - - - †Obaichthys
                  - †Dentilepisosteus
                - - †Masillosteus
                  - - †Cuneatus
                    - - Lepisosteus
                      - Atractosteus
        - Teleosteomorpha
          - Arapaima
          - - †Pholidophorus
            - Elops

As a means to avoid potential competition, the families of Pycnodontiforms evolved different body and jaw shapes, resulting in a highly diverse group. Pycnodontidae were the most advanced group, being the largest family, comprising 26 known described genera.

- Pycnodontiformes
  - - Paramesturus
  - - Palaeobalistum
    - - Mesturidae
        - Micropycnodon
        - Mesturus
      - - Gyrodontidae
          Gyrodus
        - - Arduafrons
          - - Piranhamesodon
            - Apomesodon
            - - Brembodontidae
                - Brembodus
                - - Eomesodon
                  - Gibbodon
              - - Macromesodon
                - Pycnodontidae
                  - Stenamara
                  - - Proscinetinae
                      - Turbomesodon
                      - - Turboscinetes
                        - - Thiollierepycnodus
                          - - Neoproscinetes
                            - Proscinetes
                    - - Stemmatodus
                      - - - - Acromystax
                            - Ocloedus
                        - - Lemanja
                          - - Tepexichthys
                            - - Scalacurvichthys
                              - - Polazzodus
                                - Sylvienodus
                                - Coelodus
                                - Oropycnodus
                                - Pycnodus
                                - Nursalliinae
                                  - - Paranursallia
                                    - Nursallia
                                  - Abdobalistum
