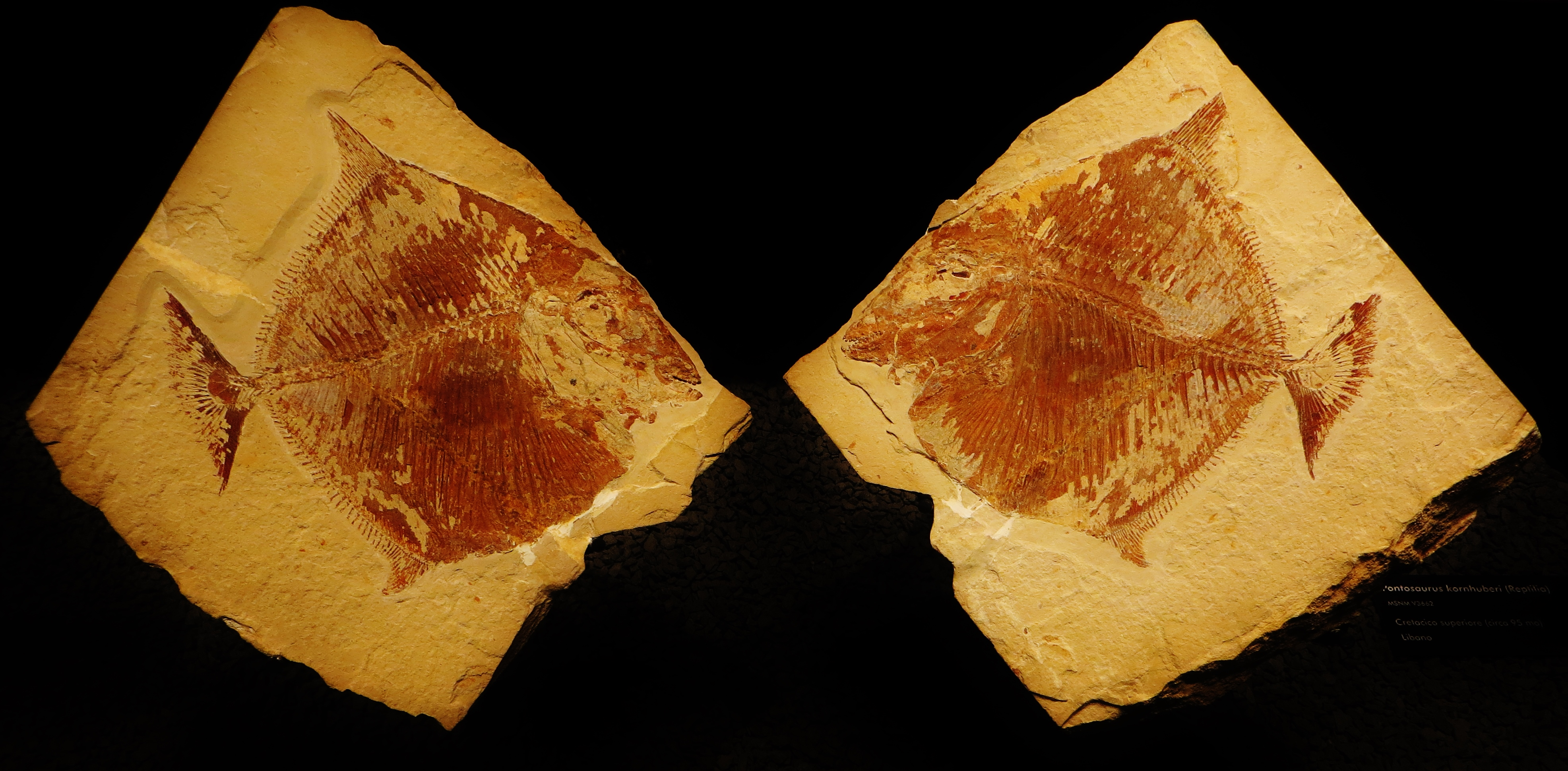
- Fossil of "Nursallia" goedeli, a species tentatively classified to this genus

Scientific classification
- Domain: Eukaryota
- Kingdom: Animalia
- Phylum: Chordata
- Class: Actinopterygii
- Order: †Pycnodontiformes
- Family: †Pycnodontidae
- Subfamily: †Nursallinae
- Genus: †Nursallia; Blot 1987

Type species
- Nursallia veronae Blot, 1987

= Nursallia =

Nursallia Temporal range: Late Cretaceous to Eocene, 99.7–48.6 Ma

Extinct genus of fishes

Nursallia is an extinct genus of pycnodontid ray-finned fishes, ranging from the Late Cretaceous period until its extinction during the Eocene.
