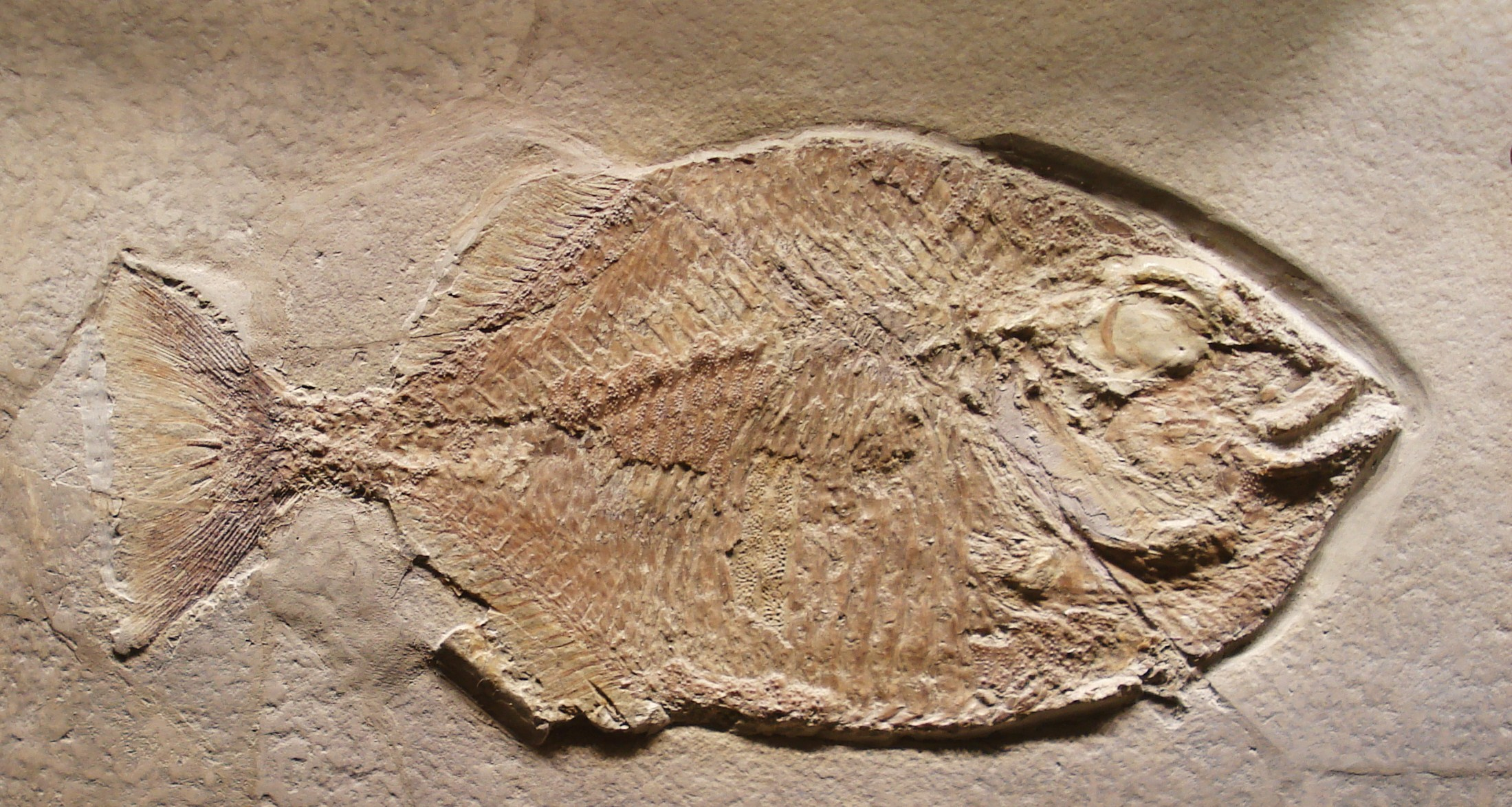
- Mesturus fossil

Scientific classification
- Domain: Eukaryota
- Kingdom: Animalia
- Phylum: Chordata
- Class: Actinopterygii
- Order: †Pycnodontiformes
- Family: †Mesturidae
- Genus: †Mesturus; Wagner, 1862

= Mesturus =

Extinct genus of fishes

Mesturus is an extinct genus of ray-finned fish from the Jurassic.
