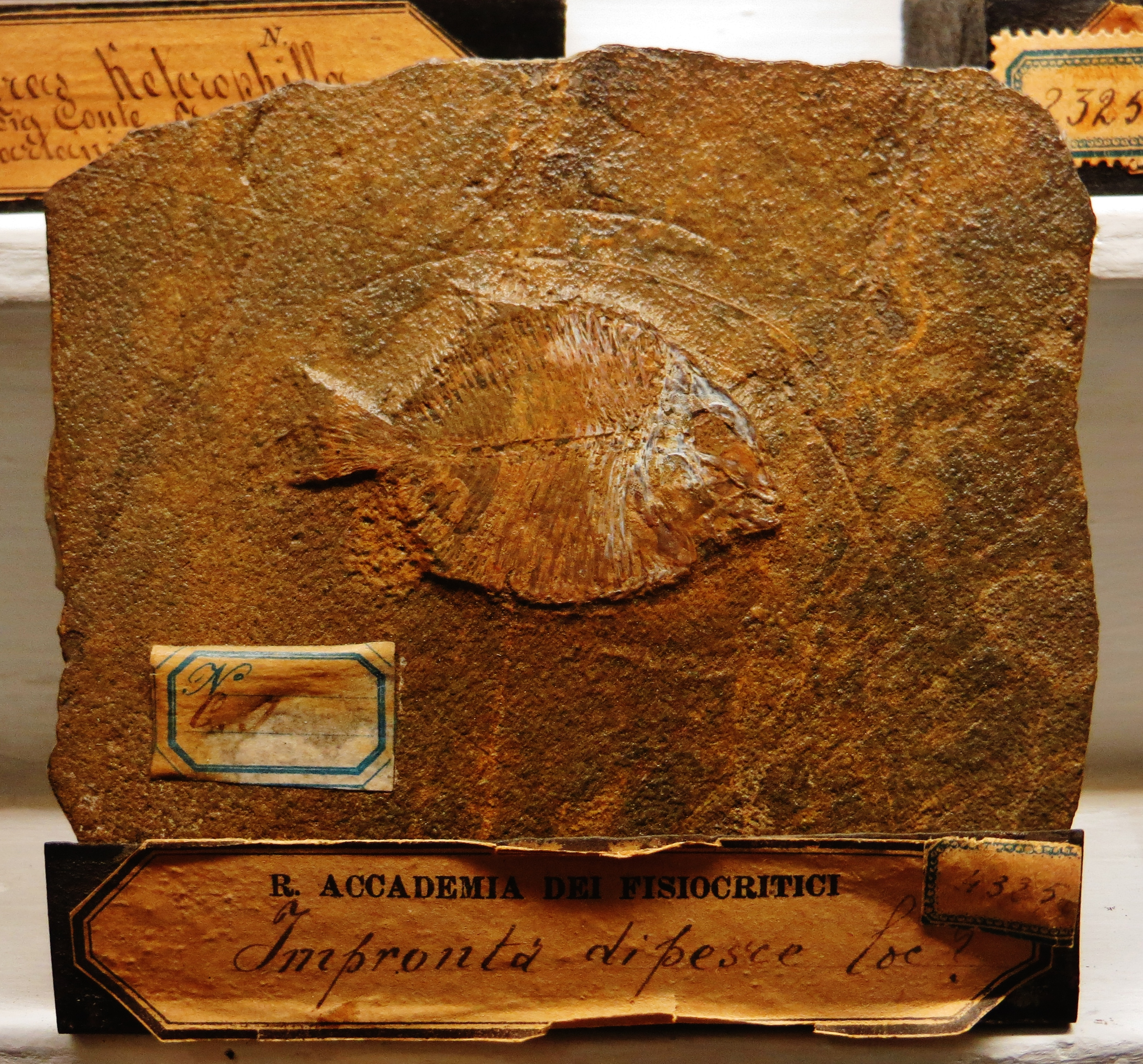
- Fossil of S. rhombus

Scientific classification
- Kingdom: Animalia
- Phylum: Chordata
- Class: Actinopterygii
- Order: †Pycnodontiformes
- Family: †Pycnodontidae
- Genus: †Stemmatodus; Heckel,1856

= Stemmatodus =

Stemmatodus Temporal range: Early Cretaceous

Extinct genus of fishes

Stemmatodus is an extinct genus of prehistoric ray-finned fish that lived in Europe during the Early Cretaceous approximately 129 to 125 million years ago.

== See also ==
- List of prehistoric bony fish
- Prehistoric fish
