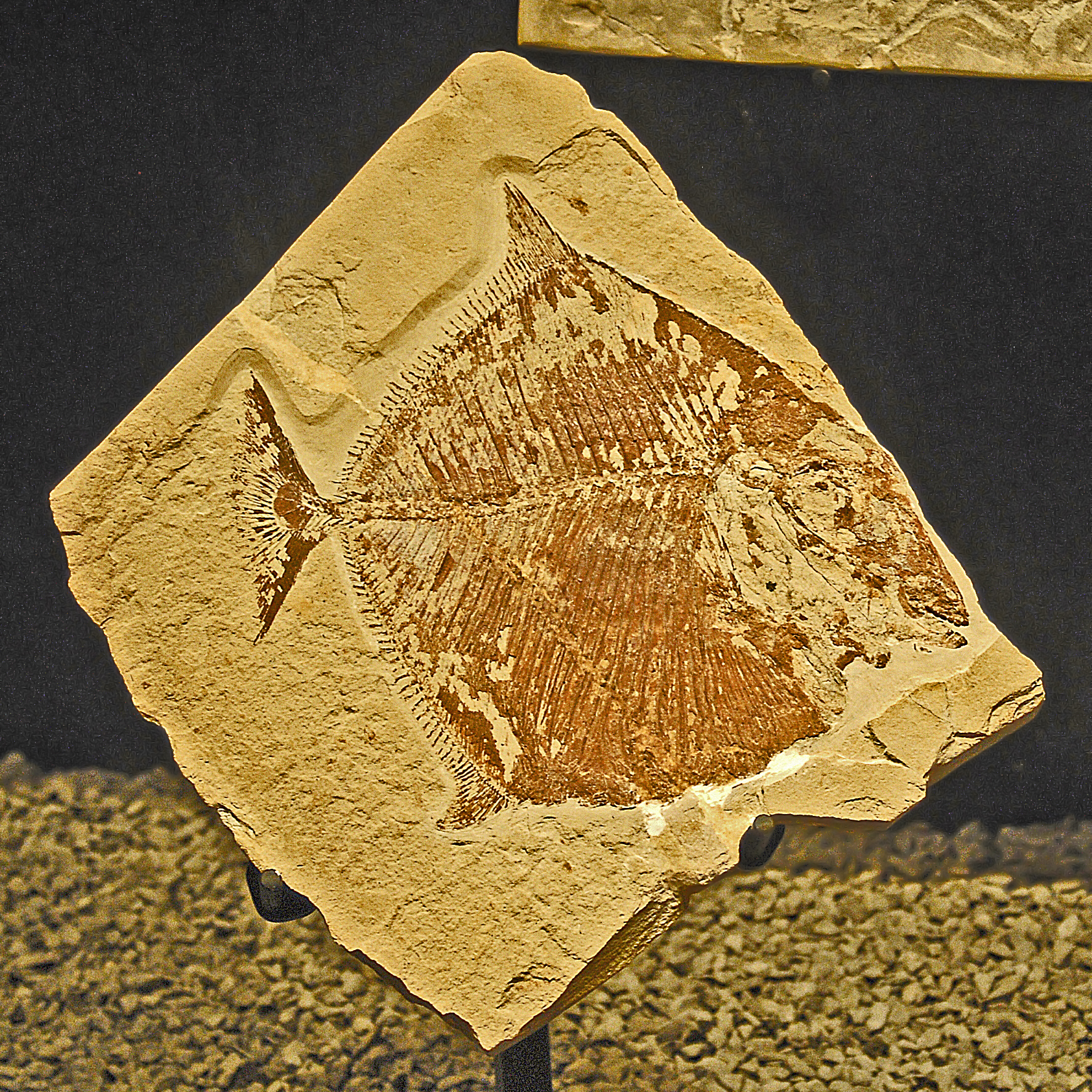
- Palaeobalistum goedeli from Lebanon. Cretaceous (abt. 95 Ma)

Scientific classification
- Kingdom: Animalia
- Phylum: Chordata
- Class: Actinopterygii
- Order: †Pycnodontiformes
- Family: †Pycnodontidae
- Genus: †Palaeobalistum; Blainville, 1818

Species
- See text

= Palaeobalistum =

Palaeobalistum Temporal range: Albian-Early Eocene ~112.6–48.6 Ma

Extinct genus of fishes

Palaeobalistum is an extinct genus of prehistoric ray-finned fish which ranged from the Cretaceous to Eocene periods.

== Etymology ==
The Latin genus name derives from a Greek word meaning "thick tooth".

== Species ==
The following species have been described:

- Palaeobalistum dossantosi Maury, 1930
- Palaeobalistum flavellatum Cope, 1886
- Palaeobalistum geiseri Thurmond, 1974
- Palaeobalistum goedeli Heckel, 1856
- Palaeobalistum gutturosum Arambourg, 1954
- Palaeobalistum libanicum Kramberger, 1895
- Palaeobalistum orbiculatum Blainville, 1818
- Palaeobalistum ponsortii Heckel, 1854
- Palaeobalistum rectidens Thurmond, 1974
- Palaeobalistum zignoi Blot, 1987

== Distribution ==
Fossils of Palaeobalistum have been found in:

Cretaceous

- Gramame Formation, Brazil
- Greenhorn Limestone, Colorado
- Antlers Formation, Oklahoma
- Glen Rose, Paluxy and Walnut Formations, Texas
- Haqel Limestone, Lebanon

Eocene

- Monte Bolca, Italy

== See also ==
- Prehistoric fish
- List of prehistoric bony fish
