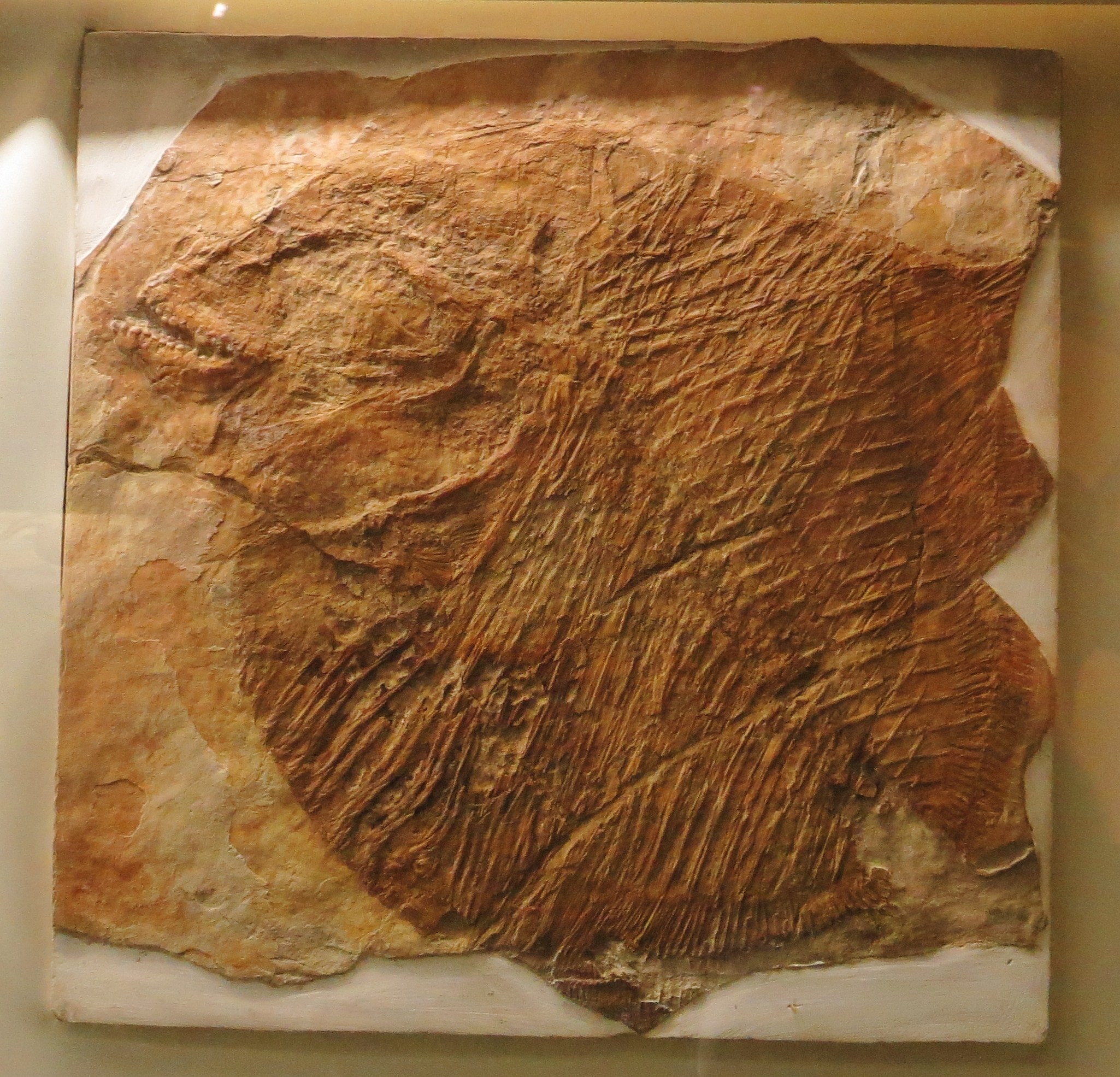
- Specimen at Naturmuseum Senckenberg

Scientific classification
- Kingdom: Animalia
- Phylum: Chordata
- Class: Actinopterygii
- Order: †Pycnodontiformes
- Family: †Pycnodontidae
- Genus: †Coelodus; Heckel, 1854

Type species
- †Coelodus saturnus Heckel, 1854

Other species
- See text

= Coelodus =

Coelodus Temporal range: Turonian–Santonian Possible Late Jurassic to Ypresian occurrence

Extinct genus of fishes

Coelodus is an extinct genus of marine and possibly freshwater pycnodont fish. It contains only one definitive species, C. saturnus Heckel, 1854 (=C. rosthorni Heckel, 1854, C. suillus Heckel, 1854), from the Late Cretaceous (Turonian to Santonian) of Slovenia. Other species from the Late Jurassic to the Eocene have also been attributed to this genus based on isolated dental elements, but their assignment to Coelodus is uncertain, and this genus likely represents a non-monophyletic wastebasket taxon. A potential diagnostic trait is a prearticular tooth row with three regular highly elongated teeth.

== Taxonomy ==
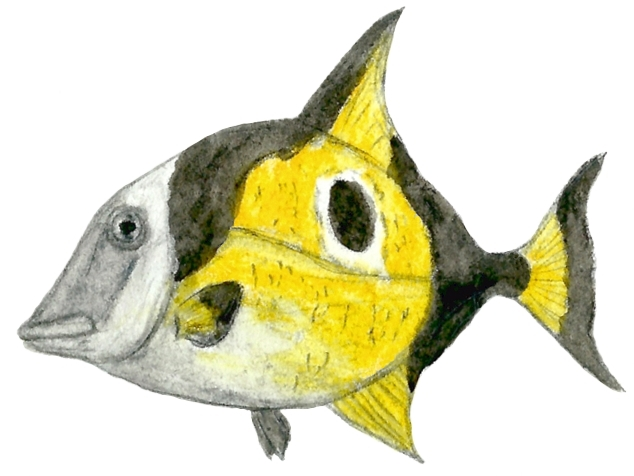
Life restoration of C. saturnus

In addition to C. saturnus, the following are all dubiously classified into this genus:

- C. anomalus Choffat & Priem 1904 - Barremian of Portugal
- C. arcuatus Woodward 1918 - Berriasian of England (Purbeck Formation)
- C. bocagei Sauvage, 1897 - Cenomanian and Turonian of Portugal
- C. brownii Cope 1895 - Albian of Kansas, USA (Kiowa Shale)
- C. bursauxi Priem 1912 - Maastrichtian of Tunisia
- C. cantabrigiensis Woodward 1895 - Cenomanian of England (Cambridge Greensand)
- C. choffati Sauvage 1898 - Cenomanian of Portugal
- C. crassus Dartevelle & Casier, 1949 - Maastrichtian of the Democratic Republic of the Congo (Kongo Central)
- C. cuneiformis Sauvage 1898 - Cenomanian of Portugal
- C. decaturensis Gidley 1913 - Albian of Texas, USA
- C. delabathiei (Priem 1924) - Coniacian/Santonian of Madagascar
- C. delgadoi Sauvage 1898 - Cenomanian of Portugal
- C. ellipticus Egerton 1877 - Albian of England (Folkestone Formation)
- C. fabadens Gidley 1913 - Early Cretaceous of Texas, USA
- C. fabarius (Sismonda 1861) - Early Cretaceous of Italy
- C. feddeni (Prasad & Raghavendra 1959) - Paleocene of Sindh, Pakistan
- C. gasperinii Gorjanović-Kramberger 1902
- C. glauconiensis Leriche, 1929 - Santonian of Belgium
- C. gridellii d'Erasmo 1952 - Late Cretaceous of Italy
- C. gyrodoides Egerton 1877 - Late Cretaceous of Lyme Regis, England
- C. hirudo (Agassiz 1836) - Valanginian of England
- C. inaequidens Woodward 1893 - Cenomanian of England (Cambridge Greensand)
- C. jacobi Menon & Prasad 1959 - Eocene of Assam, India (Garo Hills)
- C. jourdani de Saint Seine 1949 - Kimmeridgian of France (Cerin)
- C. laevidens Woodward 1918 - Berriasian of England (Purbeck Formation)
- C. latus Gorjanović-Kramberger 1895 - Cenomanian of Slovenia
- C. laurentii Priem 1908 - Late Jurassic of France
- C. malwaensis Chiplonkar & Ghare 1977 - Cenomanian of India (Nimar Sandstone)
- C. mesorachis Heckel 1854 - Cenomanian/Turonian of Croatia
- C. mokattamensis Priem 1897 - Eocene of Egypt and Qatar
- C. morgani Priem 1908 - Maastrichtian of Iran
- C. multidens Woodward 1918 - Barremian of England (Wealden Formation)
- C. multipinnatus Gorjanović-Kramberger 1895 - Cenomanian-Turonian of Slovenia
- C. muraltii Heckel 1848 - Late Cretaceous of Croatia
- C. oblongus Heckel 1854 - Cenomanian/Turonian of Croatia
- C. ovalis Gorjanović-Kramberger 1895
- C. parallelus (Egerton ex Dixon 1850) - Turonian of England
- C. pellei (Priem 1903) - Early Eocene of Tunisia
- C. plethodon Arambourg & Joleaud 1943 - Cenomanian/Turonian of Niger, Maastrichtian of Algeria
- C. portucalensis Jonet 1981 - Cenomanian of Portugal
- C. priemi Leriche 1903 - Late Jurassic of France
- C. ribeiroi Sauvage 1898 - Turonian of Portugal
- C. rostratus Gorjanović-Kramberger 1895 - Cenomanian of Slovenia
- C. soleri Rullán 1948 - Albian/Cenomanian of Catalonia, Spain
- C. stantoni Williston 1900 - Albian of Kansas, USA (Kiowa Shale)
- C. subsimilis (Cornuel 1880) Priem 1912 - Late Jurassic of France
- C. syriacus Hussakof 1916 - Late Cretaceous of Lebanon
- C. vetteri Gorjanović-Kramberger 1895 - Cenomanian-Turonian of Slovenia
- C. zambiensis Dartevelle & Casier 1949 - Turonian of the Democratic Republic of the Congo (Kongo Central)

A number of former species in this genus based on complete fossil specimens, such as C. costae Heckel, 1856 (=C. achillis (Costa 1853), C. discus Heckel 1856, C. grandis (Costa 1855), C. pyrrhurus Heckel, 1854) C. subdiscus Wenz, 1989, C. rosadoi Silva Santos, 1963 and C. toncoensis Benedetto & Sanchez ,1972 have since been reclassified into the genera Ocloedus and Costapycnodus, and many of these dentition-only taxa may belong there instead. Others, such as the former C. muensteri, are now placed in Anomoeodus.

Indeterminate remains are known from the Csehbánya Formation of Hungary and the Kem Kem Beds of Morocco. Notably, these formations, in addition to other formations that Coelodus remains are known from worldwide, are freshwater deposits, suggesting at a potentially amphidromous lifestyle for Coelodus given its occurrence in marine environments as well. It is possible that freshwater and brackish environments served as refugia for Coelodus, allowing for it to survive the Cretaceous-Paleogene extinction event.

== See also ==
- Prehistoric fish
- List of prehistoric bony fish
