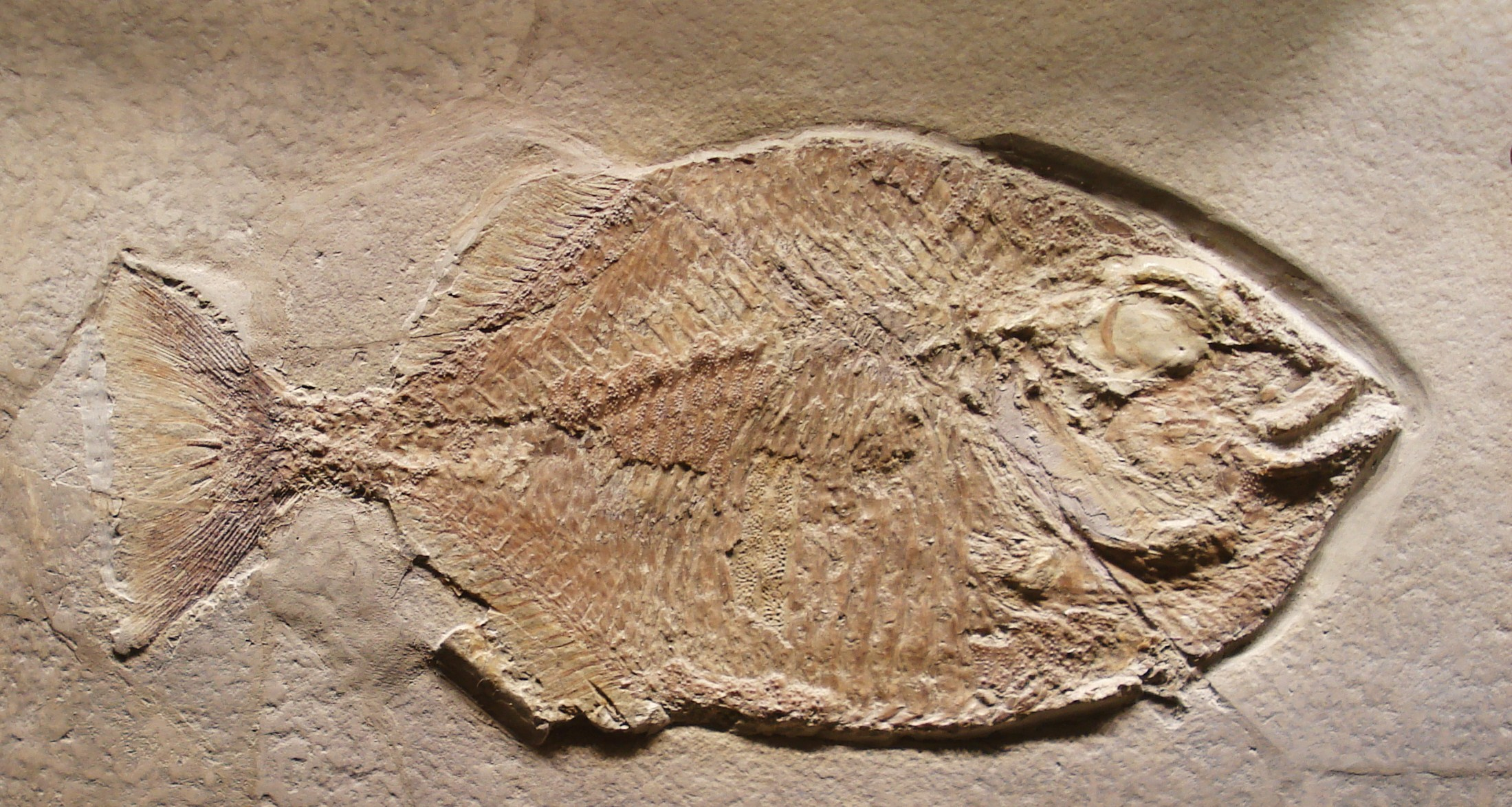
- A completely preserved skeleton of Mesturus verrucosus

Scientific classification
- Kingdom: Animalia
- Phylum: Chordata
- Class: Actinopterygii
- Order: †Gyrodontiformes
- Family: †Mesturidae; Nursall, 1996

Type genus
- †Mesturus Wagner, 1862

Other genera
- †Aminiichthys Ebert, 2026; †Arduafrons Frickhinger, 1991; †Micropycnodon Hibbard and Graffham, 1945; †Paramesturus Taverne, 1981

= Mesturidae =

Extinct genus of fishes

Mesturidae is a family of pycnodontomorph fishes.
