= Callodus =

Scientific classification
- Kingdom: Animalia
- Phylum: Arthropoda
- Class: Insecta
- Order: Coleoptera
- Suborder: Polyphaga
- Infraorder: Cucujiformia
- Family: Brachyceridae
- Genus: Callodus; Hustache, 1932
- Species: C. costipennis

Binomial name
- Callodus costipennis Hustache, 1932

Genus of beetles

Callodus is a monotypic genus of weevils belonging to the family Brachyceridae. The only species is Callodus costipennis.
