= Micropycnodon =

Micropycnodon Temporal range: Santonian

Scientific classification
- Domain: Eukaryota
- Kingdom: Animalia
- Phylum: Chordata
- Class: Actinopterygii
- Order: †Pycnodontiformes
- Family: †Mesturidae
- Genus: †Micropycnodon; Hibbard & Graffham, 1945

Species
- M. gaynaisensis; M. kansasensis

Extinct genus of fishes

Micropycnodon is an extinct genus of prehistoric ray-finned fish that lived during the Santonian.

== See also ==
- Prehistoric fish
- List of prehistoric bony fish
