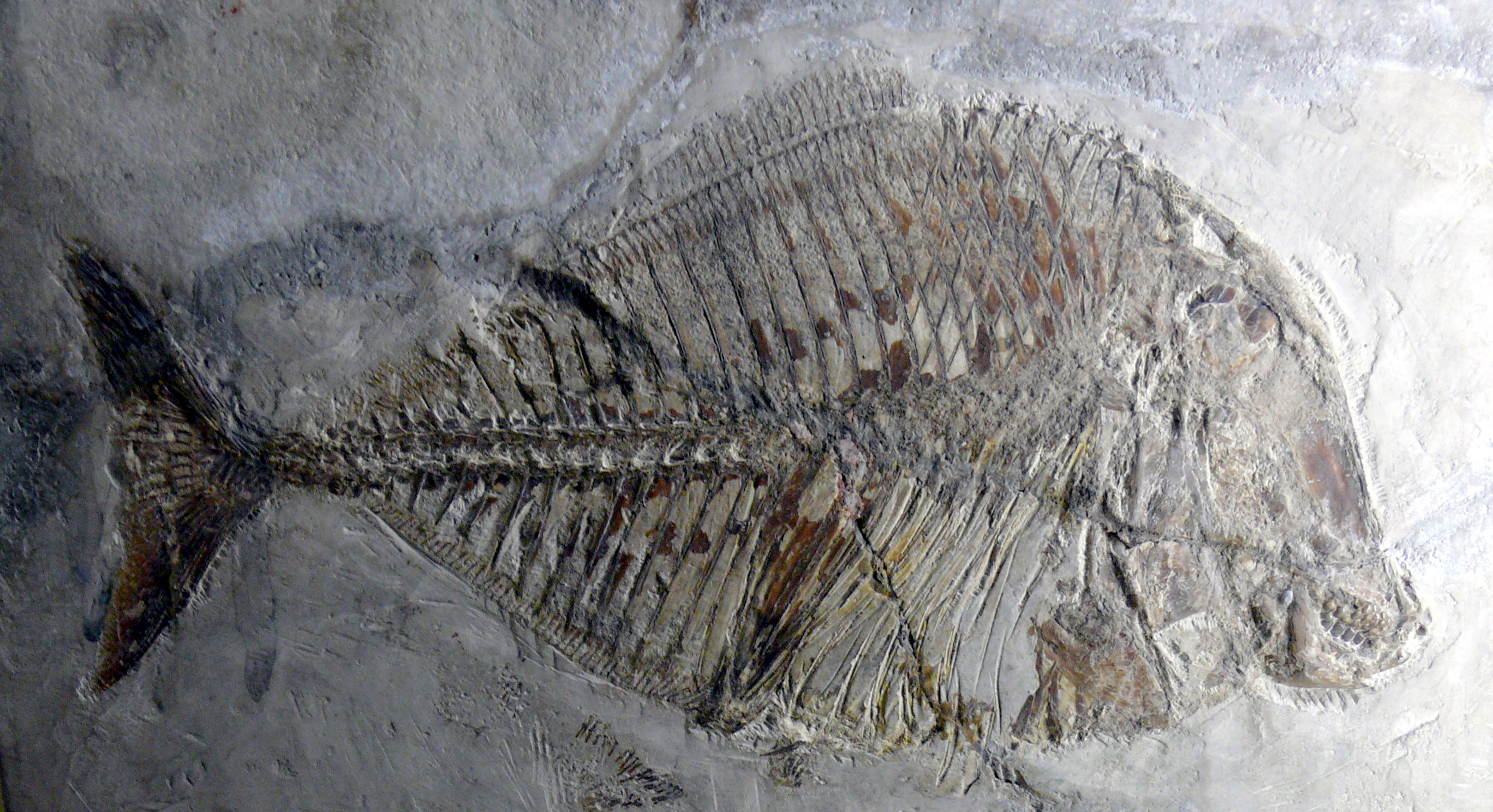
- Pycnodus apodus (=P. platessus)

Scientific classification
- Kingdom: Animalia
- Phylum: Chordata
- Class: Actinopterygii
- Order: †Pycnodontiformes
- Family: †Pycnodontidae
- Subfamily: †Pycnodontinae
- Genus: †Pycnodus; Agassiz, 1833

Type species
- Pycnodus apodus Volta, 1796

Synonyms
- Coryphaena apoda Volta, 1796; Zeus platessus Blainville, 1818; Pycnodus platessus Agassiz, 1833; Pycnodus gibbus Heckel, 1856

= Pycnodus =

Pycnodus Temporal range: Ypresian Teeth assigned to Pycnodus date back to Kimmeridgian, see text

Extinct genus of fishes

Pycnodus (from Greek: πυκνός puknós, 'dense' and Greek: ὀδούς odoús 'tooth') is an extinct genus of ray-finned fish from the Eocene period. It is a wastebasket taxon, although many fossils from the Jurassic or Cretaceous are assigned to this genus, only the Eocene species, P. apodus is valid. As its name suggests, it is the type genus of Pycnodontiformes.

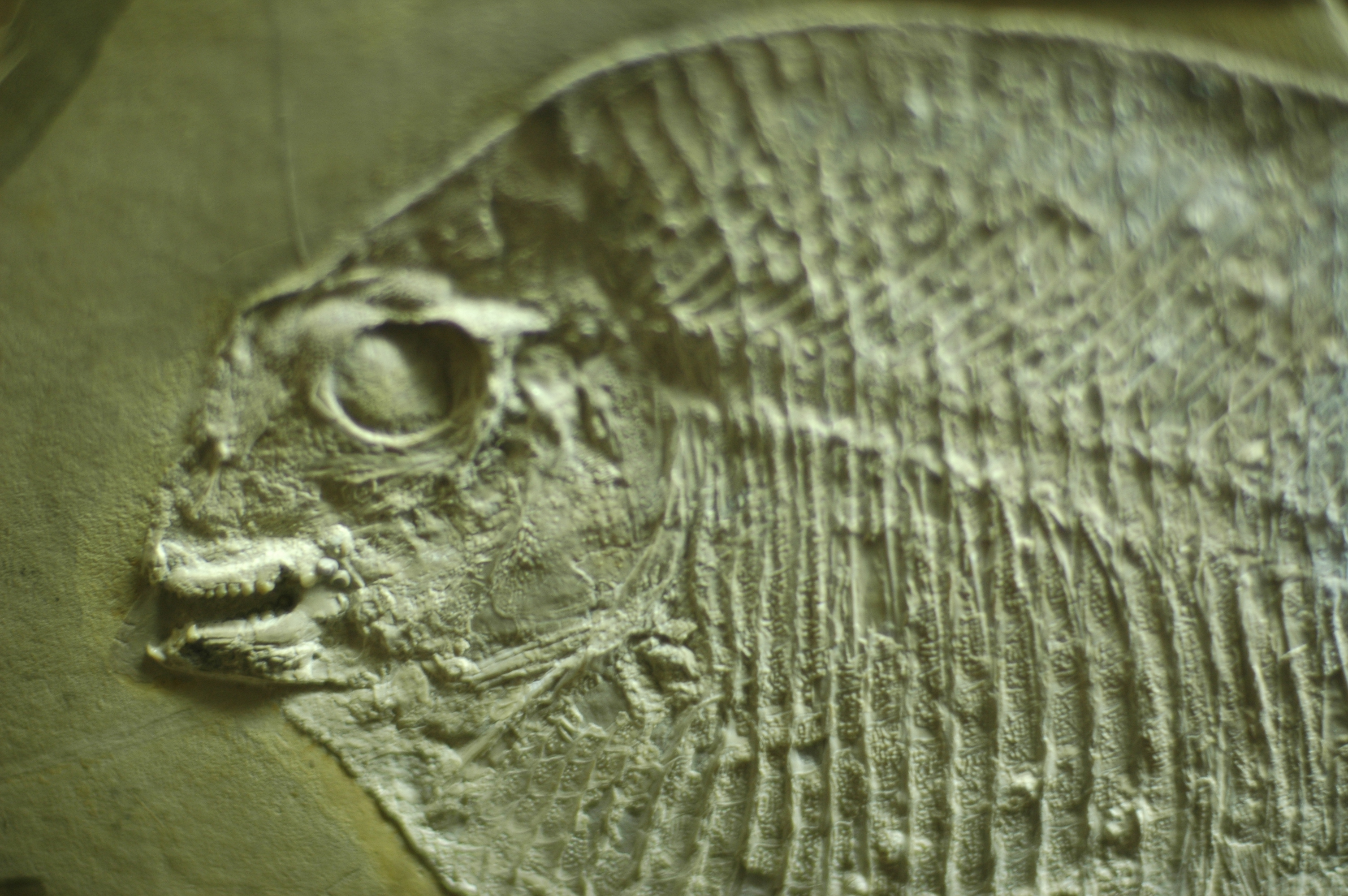
Proscinetes bernardi, one example of pycnodont that was once assigned as Pycnodus

The known whole fossils of Pycnodus are up to 30.6 centimetres (10 in) long, and have a superficial resemblance to angelfish or butterflyfish. The animals, as typical of all other pycnodontids, had many knob-like teeth, forming pavements in the jaws with which to break and crush hard food substances, probably mollusks and echinoderms. These teeth are the most common form of fossil.

Valid species of Pycnodus is only known from Monte Bolca Lagerstätte in Italy, however fossils that were assigned to Pycnodus have been found in present-day India, North Africa, Belgium, England, regions corresponding with the Tethys Ocean. A specimen of the prehistoric whale, Basilosaurus isis, was found in the Eocene-aged Wadi El Hitan with stomach contents of its last meals, including a large specimen of the species P. mokattamensis along with skeletons of a smaller whale called Dorudon.
