= Paleontology in Lebanon =

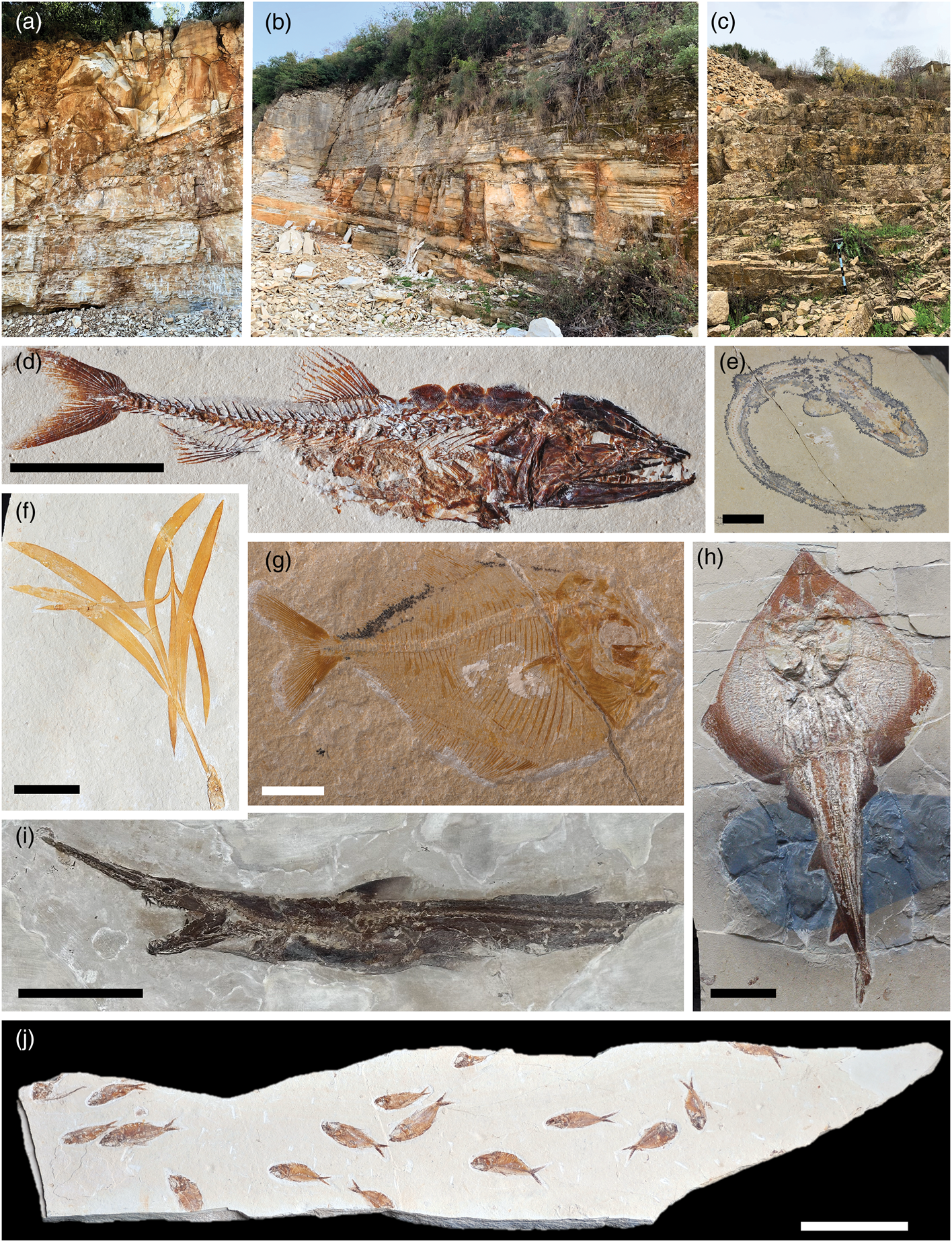
Examples of outcrop and a selection of representative fossils from the Upper Cretaceous Lagerstätten of Lebanon

The paleontological sites of Lebanon contain deposits of well preserved fossils and include some species found nowhere else. Notable among these is the Lebanese lagerstätten of the Late Cretaceous age, which contain a well-preserved variety of different fossils. Some fossils date back to the Jurassic period, and younger fossils of mammals from a different site belong to the Miocene through the Pleistocene.

== History ==
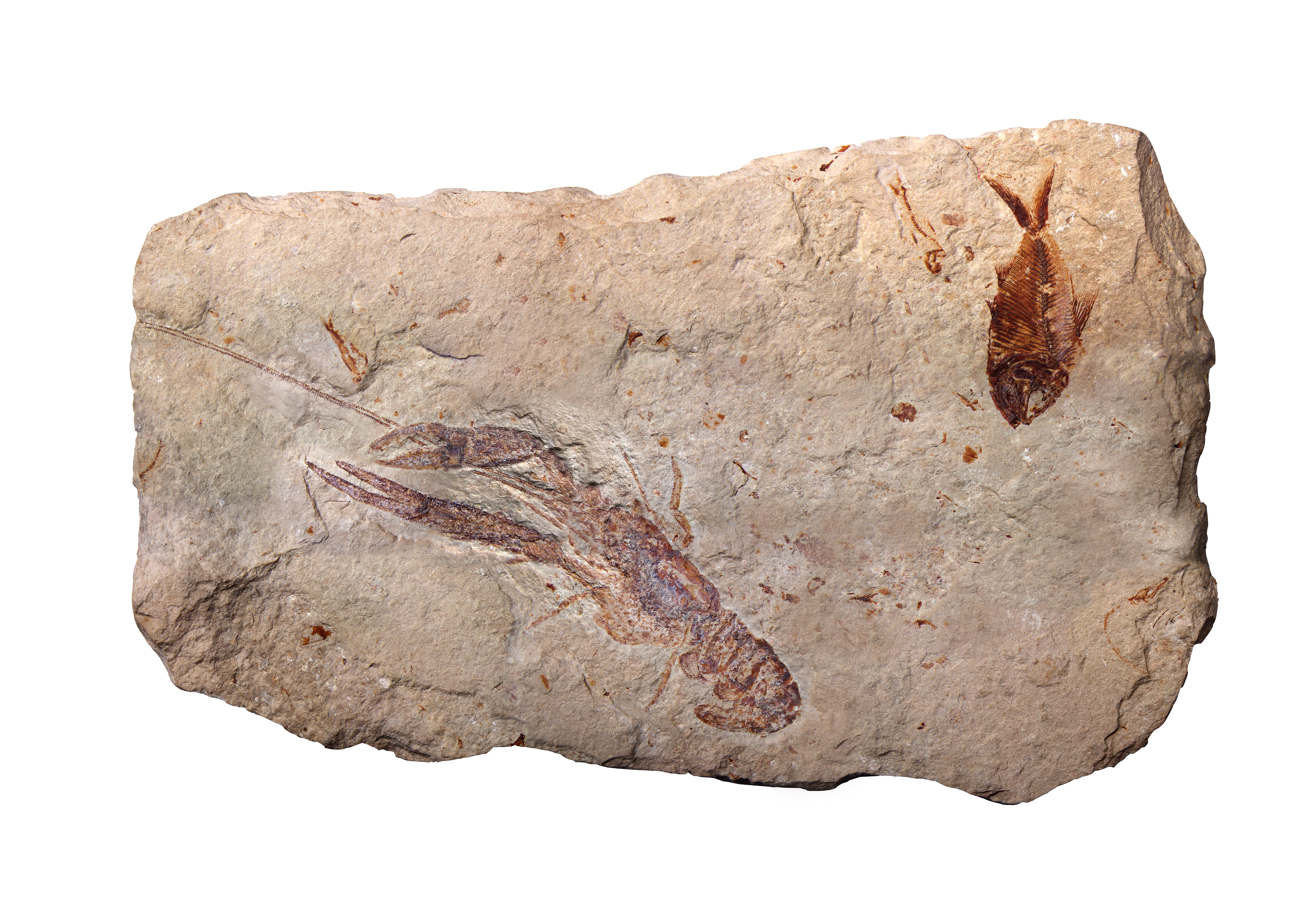
A rock containing Notahomarus sp. (lobster, left), Diplomystus birdii (fish, right), and a partial Dercetis triqueter, Cretaceous Hakel, Lebanon

The earliest known account of Lebanese fossils is attributed to Herodotus. The existence of fossil fishes in the Lebanon is referred to by Jean de Joinville. In his Histoire de Saint Louis he wrote that during the sojourn of King Louis IX of France at Sidon in 1253, just before his return home from the Seventh Crusade, a stone was brought him,

which was the most marvellous in the world, for when a layer of it was lifted, there was found between the two pieces the form of a fish. The fish was of stone, but lacked nothing in form, eyes, bones, colour, or anything necessary to a living fish.

European scientists became interested in Lebanese fossils in the 19th century.

== Locations and fossils ==
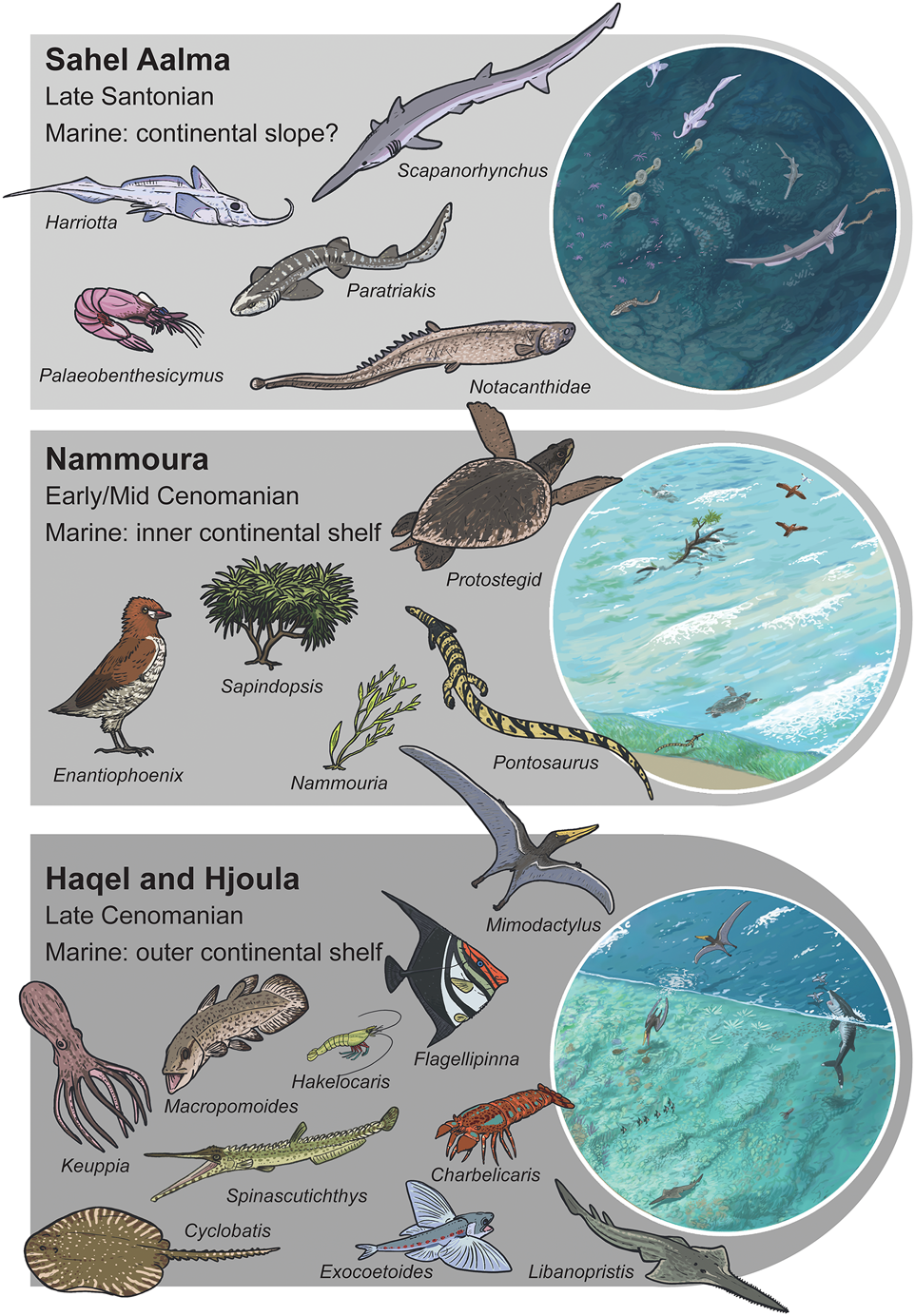
Diagram of the depositional environments of the four main Upper Cretaceous Lagerstätten of Lebanon with a selection of iconic flora and fauna

There are three major fossil locations in Lebanon: Sahel Alma, Hajula and Hakel (the latter two being part of the Sannine Formation). Hajula and Hakel are each about twelve miles north-east of the coastal town of Byblos. Hajula is situated six miles south of Hakel; and between the two villages there are two westward-projecting spurs of Mount Lebanon and an intervening valley. Both villages are approximately 2500–3000 feet above sea level. In both places there is clear evidence of faulting by which the fish-bearing strata have been lowered into the midst of older strata. Those at Hakel have been lowered to the level of the hippurite limestone of Lebanon, being above the trigonia sandstone. The Hajula beds are thought to be an extension of those at Hakel. The study of fish fossils appears to show that the horizon of the beds at Hajula is somewhat higher than that of the beds at Hakel.

The fishes found at Sahel Alma mostly belong to the same genera as those at Hakel and Hajula, but of around sixty species, probably not one is found elsewhere. Twenty-one species found at Hajula also occur at Hakel. These data make it quite certain that the beds at Sahel Alma are on a different level from those at Hakel and Hajula; while those at the latter places are on the same, or nearly the same, horizon. Opinions differ as to which are older, the fish-beds at Sahel Alma or those at Hakel, but the view of modern authorities is that those at Hakel are more ancient. This opinion appears to be supported by the character of the fishes in each. From a study of the fishes taken at Hajula, the beds containing them may belong to a slightly more recent time than that of the beds at Hakel.

The landscape of Lebanon has been subject to volcanic eruptions, tectonic plate movement, and the rising and dropping of sea levels. The Late Cretaceous was characterized by very high sea levels. During that time fossil-bearing limestone was formed.

One of the discoveries reported in 1989 was the description of Hipparion fossils from the Bekaa Valley by M. Malez and A. Forsten.

Another find was a snake with two legs. This provided a valuable example of evolution at work, illustrating how ancient lizards became modern snakes.

Octopuses are some of the rarest marine fossils, since most species have no hard structures apart from a beak. An octopus's corpse cannot usually survive long enough to become fossilized, which is why the discovery of well-preserved octopuses in Lebanon in 2009 was remarkable. Dirk Fuchs of the Freie University Berlin said about these 95-million-year-old fossil octopuses found in Lebanon:

This provides important evolutionary information. The more primitive relatives of octopuses had fleshy fins along their bodies. The new fossils are so well preserved that they show, like living octopus, that they didn't have these structures.

Some of the fossils of Keuppia levante are preserved so well that their ink is still visible.

== Fossil taxa discovered in Lebanon ==
For a comprehensive, taxonomically-ordered list, see the tables on Sannine Formation and Sahel Alma:

| Name | Authority | Age | locality | Family | Notes | Fossils |
|---|---|---|---|---|---|---|
| Aeger libanensis | Roger, 1946 | Cenomanian | Hjoula and Mayfouq | Aegeridae | A shrimp | Aeger libanensis |
| Aphanizocnemus libanensis | Dal Sasso and Pinna, 1997 | Cenomanian | Nammoûra | Varanoidea | a lizard | Aphanizocnemus libanensis |
| Aipichthys minor | (Pictet, 1850) | Cenomanian | Hjoula and Mayfouq | Aipichthyidae | A stem Lampridacea ray-finned fish | Aipichthys minor |
| Aipichthys oblongus | Gayet, 1980 | Cenomanian | Hjoula and Mayfouq | Aipichthyidae | A stem Lampridacea ray-finned fish | |
| Aipichthys velifer | Woodward, 1901 | Cenomanian | Hjoula and Mayfouq | Aipichthyidae | A stem Lampridacea ray-finned fish | Aipichthys velifer |
| Carpopenaeus callirostris | Glaessner, 1946 | Cenomanian | Hjoula and Mayfouq | Carpopenaeidae | A Carpopenaeidae shrimp | Carpopenaeus callirostris |
| Charbelicaris maronites | Haug et al., 2016 | Cenomanian | Hjoula and Mayfouq | Cancrinidae | a slipper lobster relative | |
| Cheirothrix lewisii | Davis, 1887 | Santonian | Sahel Alma | | an Alepisauriformes fish | Cheirothrix lewisii |
| Corusichthys megacephalus | Taverne & Capasso, 2014 | Cenomanian | | Coccodontidae | A pycnodontid fish | |
| Cyclobatis | Egerton, 1844 | | | Cyclobatidae | A ray genus | Cyclobatis major |
| Dorateuthis syrica | (Woodward, 1883) | Santonian | Sahel Alma | Plesioteuthididae | A squid | |
| Enantiophoenix electrophyla | Cau & Arduini, 2008 | Cenomanian | Nammoûra | Avisauridae | An enantiornithine bird | |
| Eupodophis descouensi | Rage & Escuillié, 2000 | Cenomanian | Nammoûra | Simoliophiidae | A simoliophiid snake | Eupodophis |
| Hakelocaris vavassorii | Garassino, 1994 | Cenomanian | Hjoula and Mayfouq | Penaeidae | A penaeid shrimp | Hakelocaris vavassorii |
| Hensodon spinosus | Kriwet, 2004 | Cenomanian | Haqel, Mount Lebanon | Coccodontidae | A pycnodontiform fish | |
| Homarus hakelensis | (Fraas, 1878) | Cenomanian | Hjoula and Mayfouq | Nephropidae | A lobster | Homarus hakelensis |
| Ichthyotringa damoni | Davis, 1887 | Santonian | Sahel Alma | | An Alepisauriformes fish | Ichthyotringa damoni |
| Ichthyotringa delicata | Hay, 1903 | Santonian | | | An Alepisauriformes fish | |
| Ichthyotringa ferox | Davis, 1887 | Santonian | Sahel Alma | | An Alepisauriformes fish | Ichthyotringa ferox |
| Ichthyotringa furcata | Agassiz, 1844 | Santonian | | | An Alepisauriformes fish | |
| Keuppia levante | Fuchs, Bracchi & Weis, 2009 | Cenomanian | Hjoula | Palaeoctopodidae | A stem-group octopus | |
| Keuppia hyperbolaris | Fuchs, Bracchi & Weis, 2009 | Cenomanian | Hjoula | Palaeoctopodidae | A stem-group octopus | |
| Lebanoraphidia nana | Bechly & Wolf-Schwenninger, 2011 | Barremian–Aptian | Lebanese amber | Mesoraphidiidae | A stem group Snakefly | |
| Libanopristis hiram | (Hay, 1903) | Cenomanian | Hjoula | Sclerorhynchidae | A sawfish | Libanopristis hiram |
| Libanopsis | Kirejtshuk, 2015 | Barremian | Lebanese amber | Sphindidae | A beetle genus with five species | |
| Micropristis solominis | (Hay, 1903) | Cenomanian | Hjoula | Sclerorhynchidae | a sclerorhynchid sawfish | Micropristis solominis |
| Microtuban altivolans | Elgin & Frey 2011 | Cenomanian | Sannine Formation | Neoazhdarchia | An Azhdarchoid pterosaur | |
| Mimodactylus libanensis | Kellner et al., 2019 | Cenomanian | Sannine Formation | Mimodactylidae | A Mimodactylid pterosaur | Mimodactylus libanensis |
| Nematonotus longispinus | (Davis, 1887) | Cenomanian | Haqel, Mount Lebanon | Aulopidae | An aulopid fish | Nematonotus longispinus |
| Palaeobalistum goedeli | Heckel, 1856 | Cenomanian | Hjoula and Mayfouq | Pycnodontidae | A pycnodont fish | Palaeobalistum goedeli |
| Palaeobenthesicymus libanensis | (Brocchi, 1875) | Santonian | Sahel Alma | Benthesicymidae | A benthesicymid shrimp | |
| Palaeoctopus newboldi | (Woodward, 1896) | Santonian | Sahel Alma | Palaeoctopodidae | A stem-group octopus | |
| Paracancrinos libanensis | (Garassino & Schweigert, 2006) | upper Cretaceous | | Cancrinidae | A cancrinid lobster | |
| Parasabatinca aftimacrai | Whalley, 1978 | Barremian | Lebanese amber | Micropterigidae? | A micropterigid moth | |
| Palibacus praecursor | (Dames, 1886) | Cenomanian | Hakel | Scyllaridae | A slipper lobster | |
| Pontosaurus kornhuberi | Caldwell, 2006 | Upper Cretaceous | | Dolichosauridae | A dolichosaurid lizard | Pontosaurus kornhuberi |
| Pronotacanthus sahelalmae | (Davis, 1887) | Santonian | | Notacanthidae | a spiny eel | |
| Rhinochelys nammourensis | Tong, Hirayama, Makhoul and Escuillie, 2006 | Cenomanian | Nammoûra | Protostegidae | A protostegid sea turtle | Rhinochelys nammourensis |
| Scapanorhynchus lewisii | (Davis, 1887) | Santonian | Sahel Alma | Mitsukurinidae | A goblin shark | Scapanorhynchus lewisii |
| Sorbinichthys elusivo | Bannikov & Bacchia, 2000 | Cenomanian | Nammoûra | Sorbinichthyidae | A clupeiform fish | Sorbinichthys elusivo |
| Styletoctopus annae | Fuchs, Bracchi & Weis, 2009 | Cenomanian | Hjoula | Palaeoctopodidae | A stem-group octopus | |
| Tragichrysa ovoruptora | Pérez-de la Fuente et al., 2018 | Barremian | Lebanese amber | Chrysopoidea | chrysopoid lacewing neonates of uncertain placement | Tragichrysa ovoruptora |
| Trewavasia carinata | (Davis, 1887) | Cenomanian | Hekel | Coccodontidae | A pycnodontiform fish | Trewavasia carinata |
| Tyruschrysa melqart | Pérez-de la Fuente et al., 2018 | Barremian | Lebanese amber | Chrysopoidea | chrysopoid lacewing larva of uncertain placement | Tyruschrysa melqart |

== See also ==
- Byblos Fossil Museum
- Dany Azar on Wikispecies
- Mim Museum
