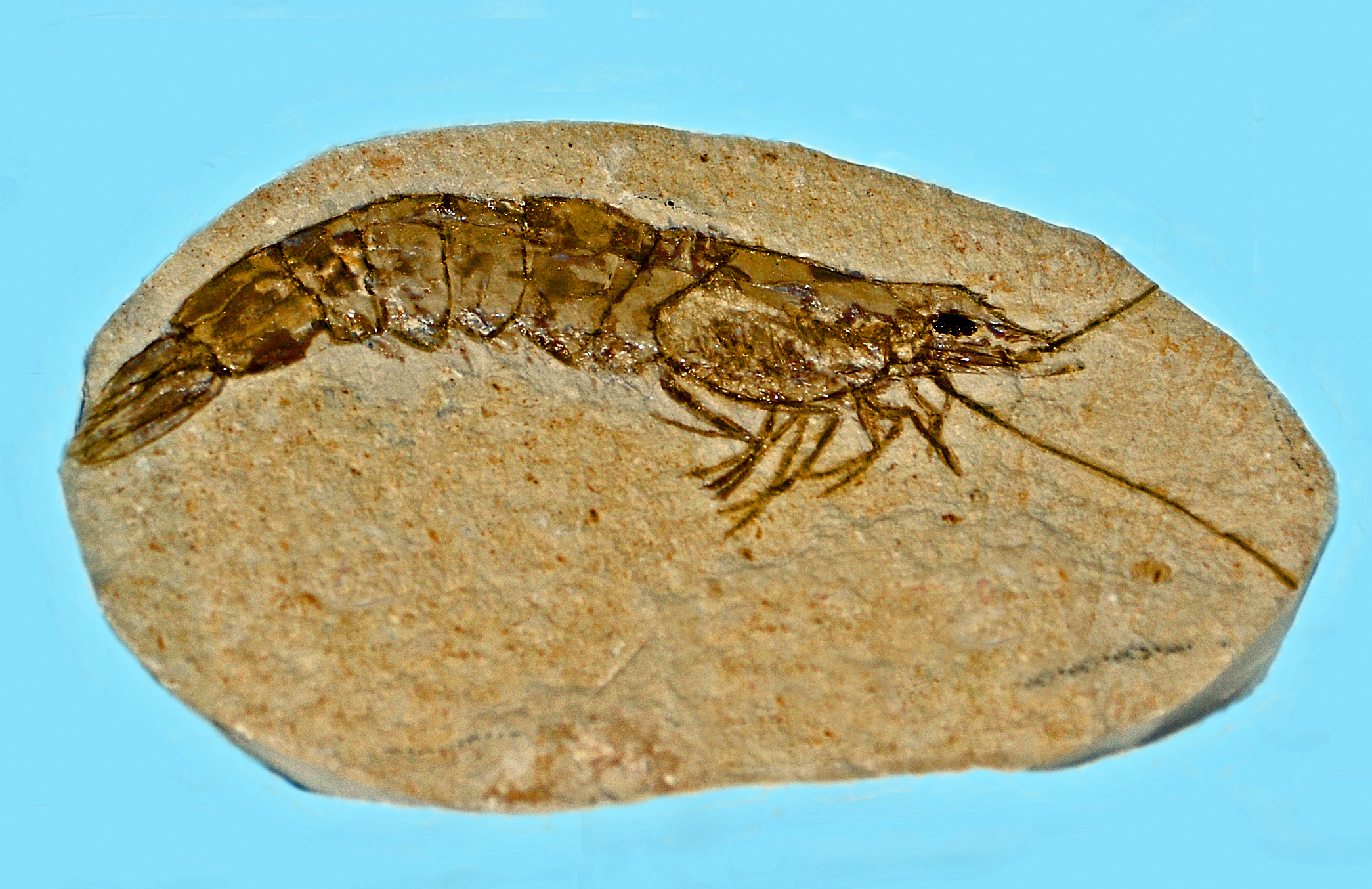
- Hakelocaris vavassorii from Lebanon

Scientific classification
- Kingdom: Animalia
- Phylum: Arthropoda
- Class: Malacostraca
- Order: Decapoda
- Suborder: Dendrobranchiata
- Family: Penaeidae
- Genus: †Hakelocaris
- Species: †H. vavassorii

Binomial name
- †Hakelocaris vavassorii Garassino, 1994

= Hakelocaris =

Hakelocaris Temporal range: Cenomanian

Genus of crustaceans

Hakelocaris vavassorii is an extinct species of prawn belonging to the family Penaeidae. It was named in 1994 by Alessandro Garassino, and is the only species in the genus Hakelocaris.

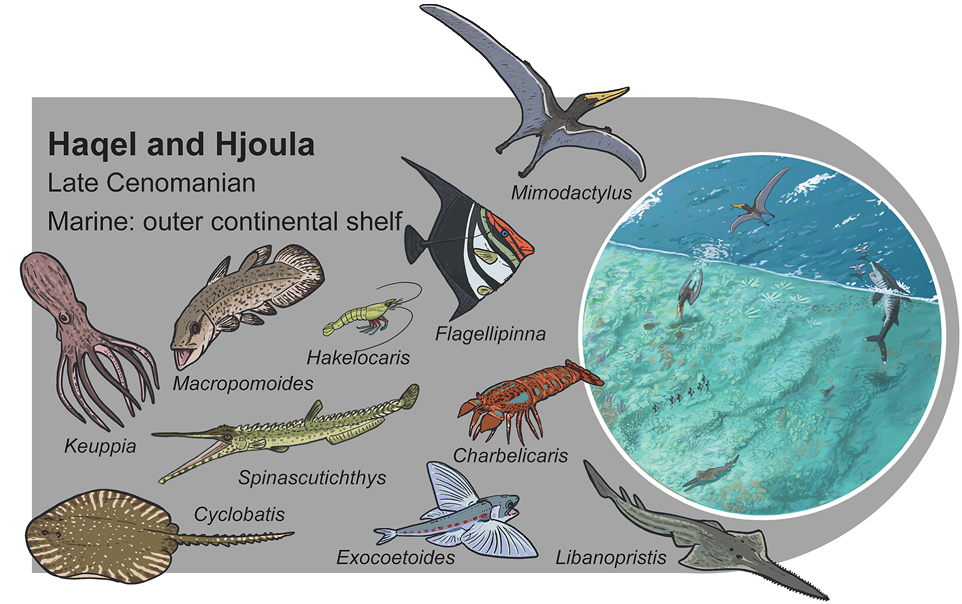
Fauna and depositional environment of the coeval Hakel and Hjoula localities, including Hakelocaris

These prawns lived during the Cenomanian age. Fossils have been found in fossiliferous marine outcrops in Hjoula and Mayfouq Lebanon.
