= MIM Museum =

Museum of minerals and fossils in Beirut, Lebanon

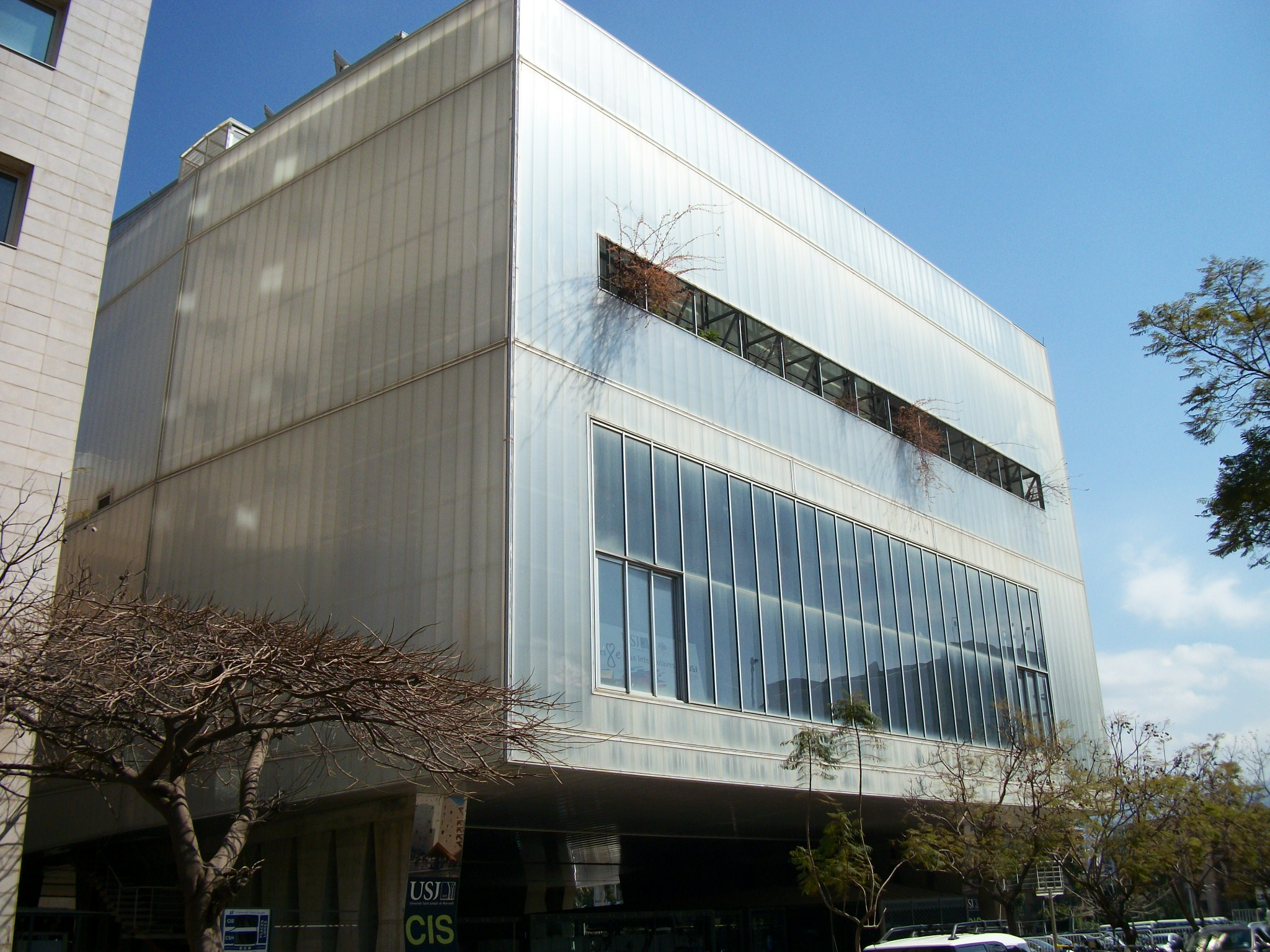
- Building where the museum is housed at Saint Joseph University
- Established: 2013
- Location: Beirut, Lebanon
- Coordinates: 33°52′48″N 35°30′51″E
- Type: Mineralogy museum
- Website: www.mim.museum

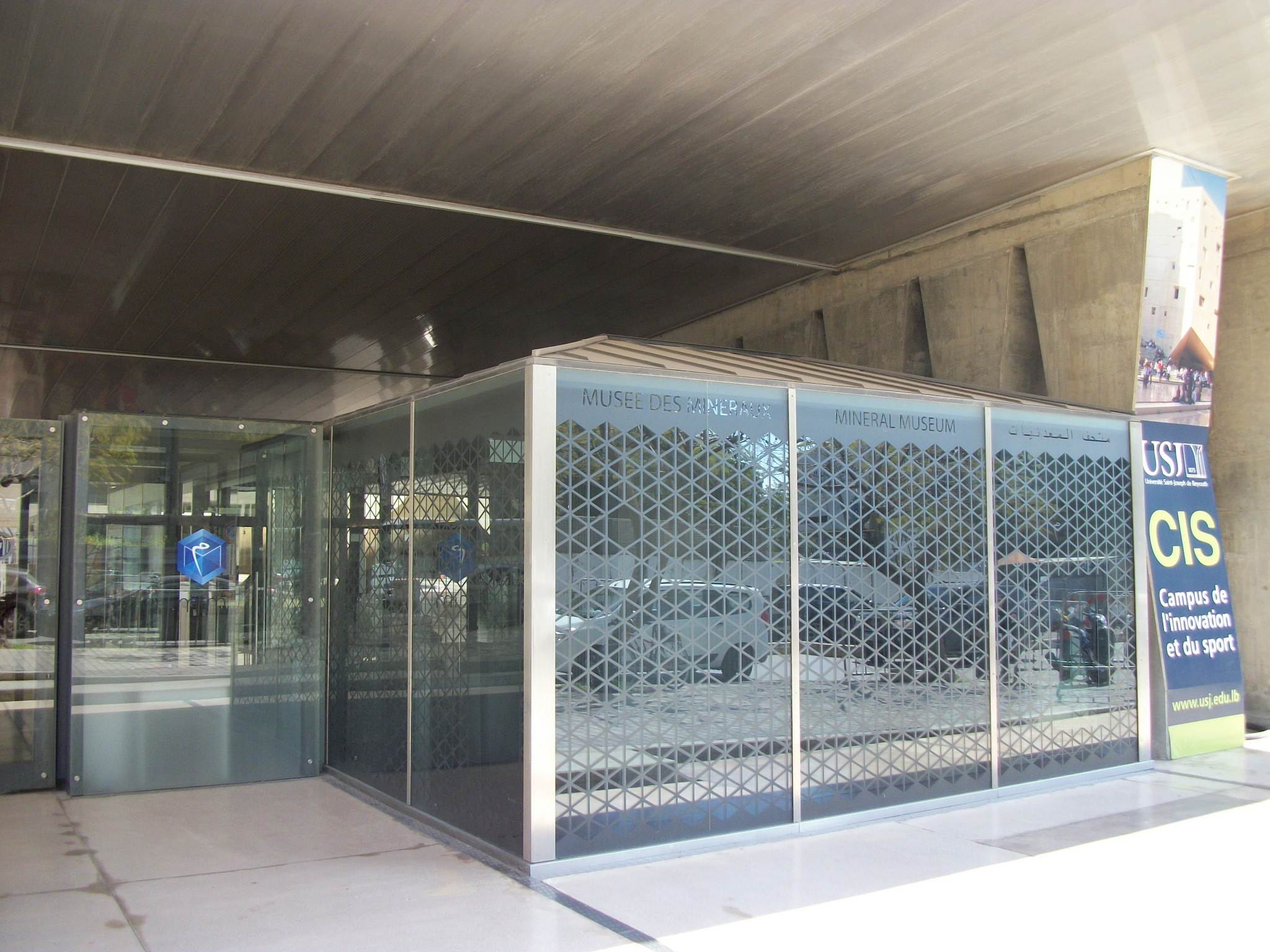
mim museum, Université Saint-Joseph Campus of the Innovation and Sport at Beyrouth

The MIM is a private museum in Beirut, Lebanon. The museum focuses on minerals and fossils. As of November 2025, the mineralogy section showcases over 2,300 mineral samples of 560 species, originating from 80 countries, and is considered one of the most significant private collections of minerals in the world. The fossil exhibition hosts marine and flying fossils from Lebanon. The museum opened in 2013.

== History ==
The MIM mineral collection was put together from 1997 by Salim Eddé, chemical engineer and co-founder of the computer company Murex. In 2004, he decided to make his collection accessible to the public and designed the first museum of its kind in Lebanon. Eddé presented the idea to Father René Chamussy, rector of the Saint Joseph University of Beirut, who adopted it and reserved for the collection 1,300 m2 in the basement of a building then under construction on the campus near the National Museum of Beirut. The inauguration of the museum, built on the personal funds of the collector, finally took place in October 2013.

The name “mim” is the 24th letter of the Arabic alphabet (corresponding to the letter M in the Latin alphabet). In Arabic, it is the first letter of the words “museum,” “minerals,” and “mines” (which is coincidentally also the case in English, French and German)."

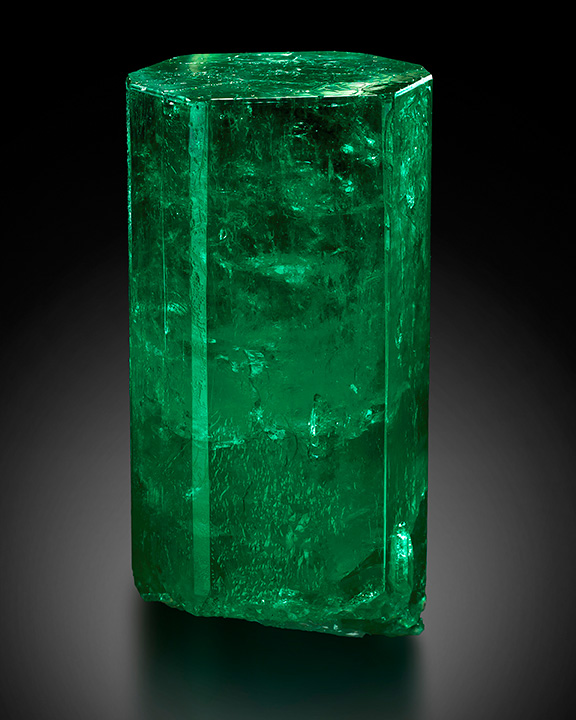
Large, di-hexagonal prismatic crystal of 1,390 carats uncut with a deep green color. It is transparent and features few inclusions in the upper 2/3, and is translucent in the lower part.

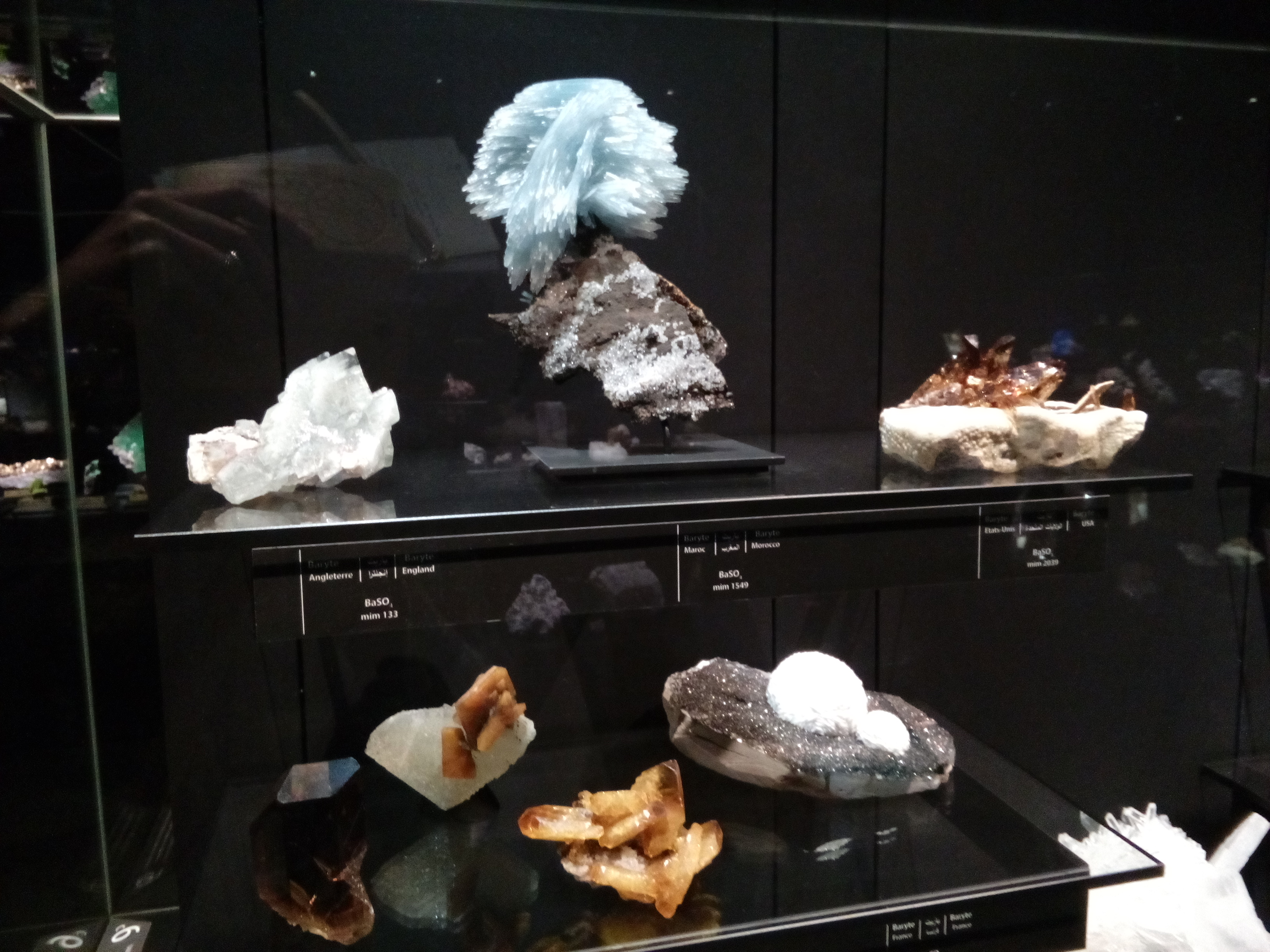
The stone at the top and in the middle is a Baryte from Morocco. It is nicknamed by the mim museum "Blue Cedar"

== Fossils ==
| Catalogue number | Taxon | Age | Unit | Images |
|---|---|---|---|---|
| MIM F1 (holotype) | Mimodactylus libanensis | Cenomanian, Late Cretaceous | Hjoula, Sannine Formation | |
| MIM F49 (holotype) | Eupodophis descouensi | Cenomanian, Late Cretaceous | Nammoura, Sannine Formation | |
| MIM F63 (holotype) | Libanoliupanshania mimi | Cenomanian, Late Cretaceous | Hjoula, Sannine Formation | |
| MIM F64 (holotype) and F65 (paratype) | Libanocordulia debiei | Cenomanian, Late Cretaceous | Hjoula, Sannine Formation | |
| MIM F1001 (holotype) and F1002, F1003, F1008, F1009, F1016, F1017 (paratypes) | Pinnichnus haqilensis | Cenomanian, Late Cretaceous | Haqel, Sannine Formation | |
| MIM F1021 (holotype) | Pinnichnus emmae | Cenomanian, Late Cretaceous | Nammoura, Sannine Formation | |

== See also ==
- List of museums in Lebanon
- Paleontology in Lebanon
- Eupodophis
