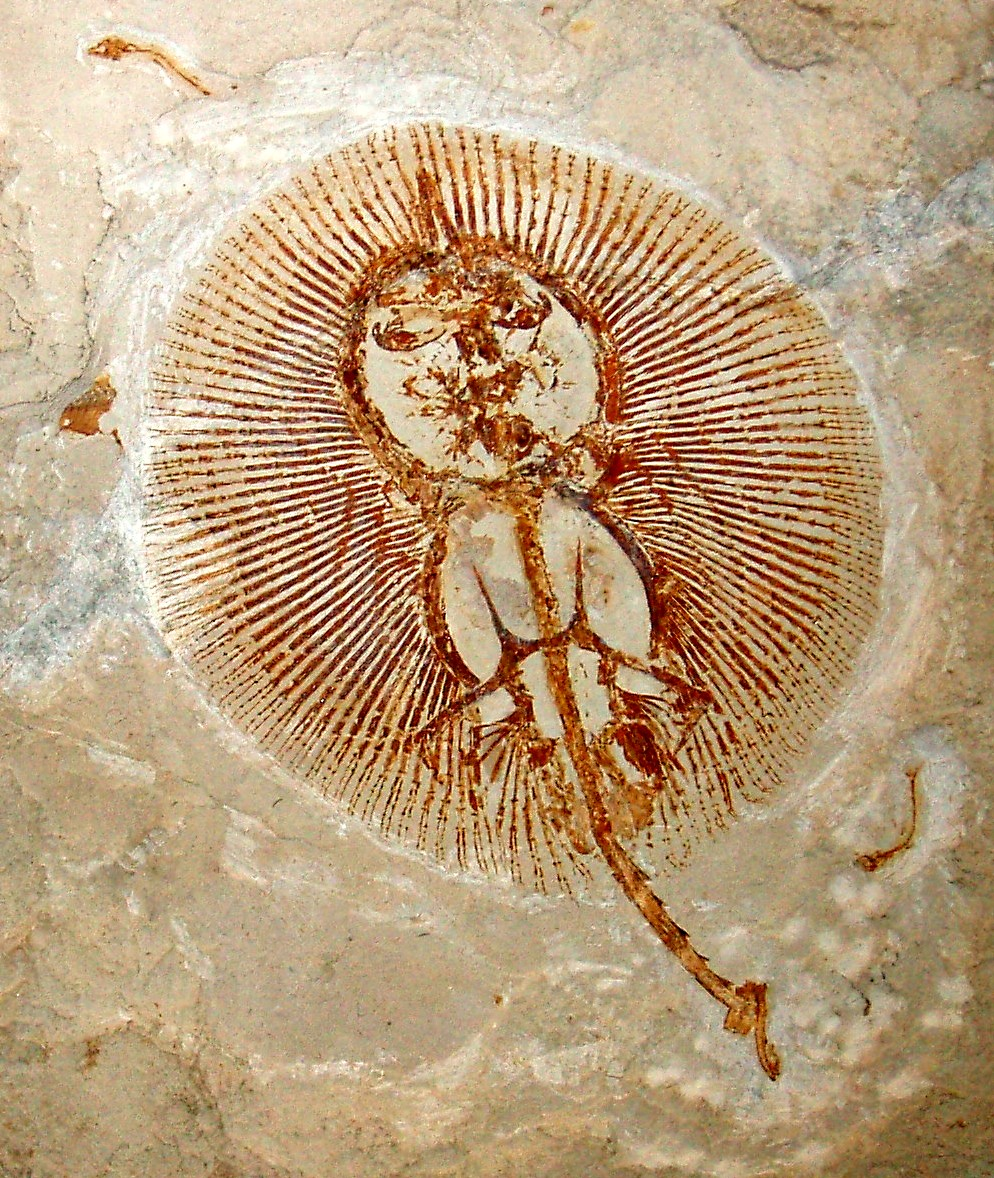
- Fossil of Cyclobatis major

Scientific classification
- Kingdom: Animalia
- Phylum: Chordata
- Class: Chondrichthyes
- Order: Rajiformes
- Family: †Cyclobatidae
- Genus: Cyclobatis Egerton, 1844

Species
- Cyclobatis longicanudatus; Cyclobatis major; Cyclobatis oligodactylus

= Cyclobatis =

Cyclobatis Temporal range: Upper Cretaceous

Extinct genus of cartilaginous fishes

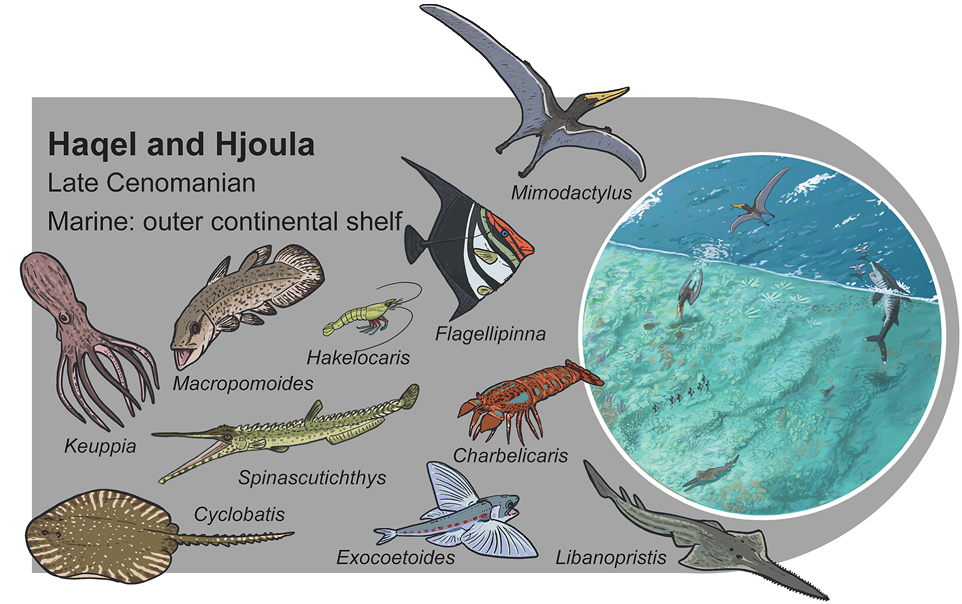
Fauna and depositional environment of the coeval Hakel and Hjoula localities, including Cyclobatis

Cyclobatis is an extinct genus of stingray-like skate from the Upper Cretaceous of what is now Lebanon. The genus is typified by a circular form. The ray measures about 10 cm or 20 cm. In life the environment of this creature was a warm shallow sea. This fish had a very short tail, fitted with a venomous stinger.

Two species are known. The shown, long-tailed Cyclobatis major and the short-tailed Cyclobatis oligodactylus. Cyclobatis major can reach a length of about 25 cm, Cyclobatis oligodactylus around 15 cm
