= Carinisphindus purpuricephalus =

Scientific classification
- Domain: Eukaryota
- Kingdom: Animalia
- Phylum: Arthropoda
- Class: Insecta
- Order: Coleoptera
- Suborder: Polyphaga
- Infraorder: Cucujiformia
- Family: Sphindidae
- Genus: Carinisphindus
- Species: C. purpuricephalus

Binomial name
- Carinisphindus purpuricephalus McHugh & Lewis, 2000

Species of beetle

Carinisphindus purpuricephalus is a species of cryptic slime mold beetle in the family Sphindidae. It is found in North America.
