= Charbelicaris =

Charbelicaris Temporal range: Upper Cretaceous

Scientific classification
- Kingdom: Animalia
- Phylum: Arthropoda
- Clade: Pancrustacea
- Class: Malacostraca
- Order: Decapoda
- Suborder: Pleocyemata
- Family: †Cancrinidae
- Genus: †Charbelicaris; Haug et al., 2016
- Species: †C. maronites

Binomial name
- †Charbelicaris maronites Haug et al., 2016

Extinct genus of crustaceans

Charbelicaris is a prehistoric genus of crustacean that lived during the Upper Cretaceous in what is now Lebanon. It is named for Charbel Makhlouf, a Lebanese Maronite saint.

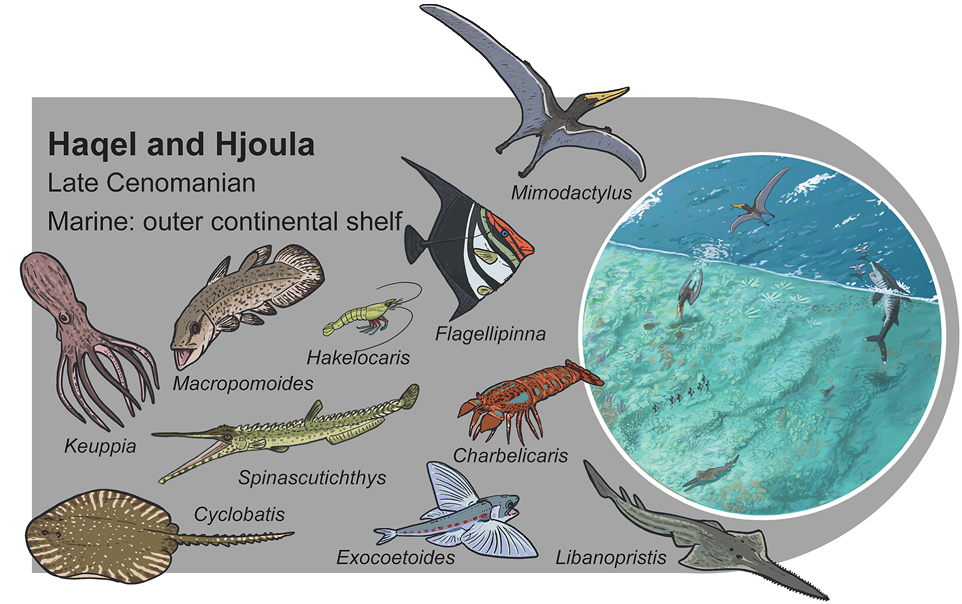
Fauna and depositional environment of the coeval Hakel and Hjoula localities, including Charbelicaris
