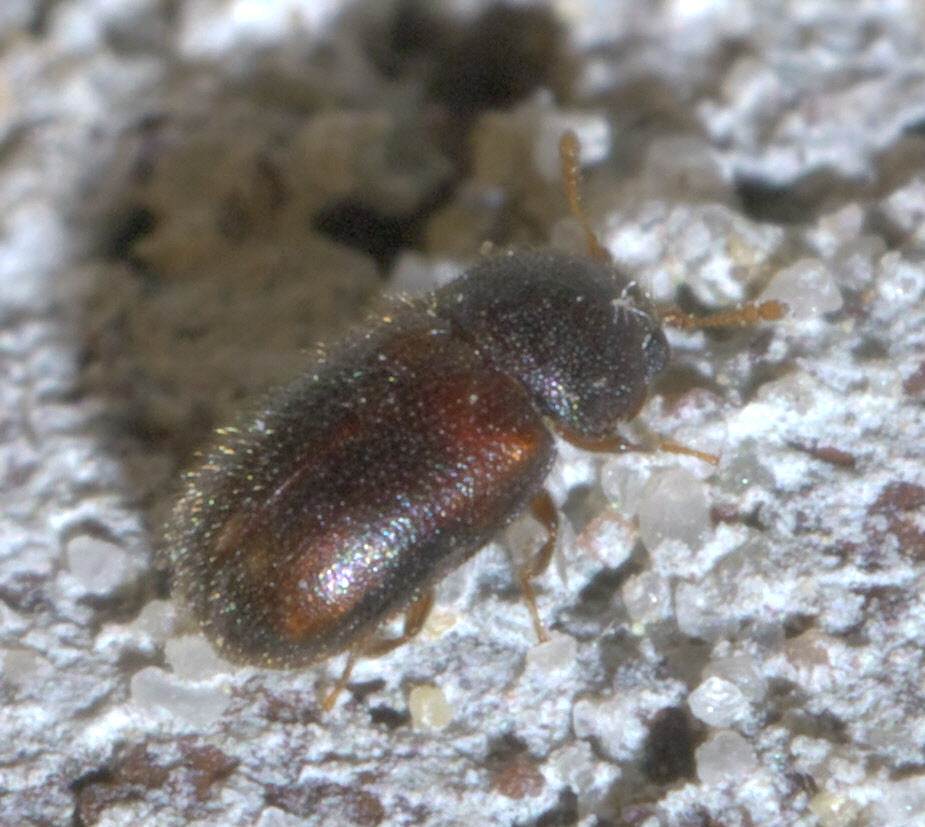

Scientific classification
- Domain: Eukaryota
- Kingdom: Animalia
- Phylum: Arthropoda
- Class: Insecta
- Order: Coleoptera
- Suborder: Polyphaga
- Infraorder: Cucujiformia
- Family: Sphindidae
- Genus: Sphindus
- Species: S. americanus

Binomial name
- Sphindus americanus LeConte, 1866

= Sphindus americanus =

Species of beetle

Sphindus americanus is a species of cryptic slime mold beetle in the family Sphindidae. It is found in North America.

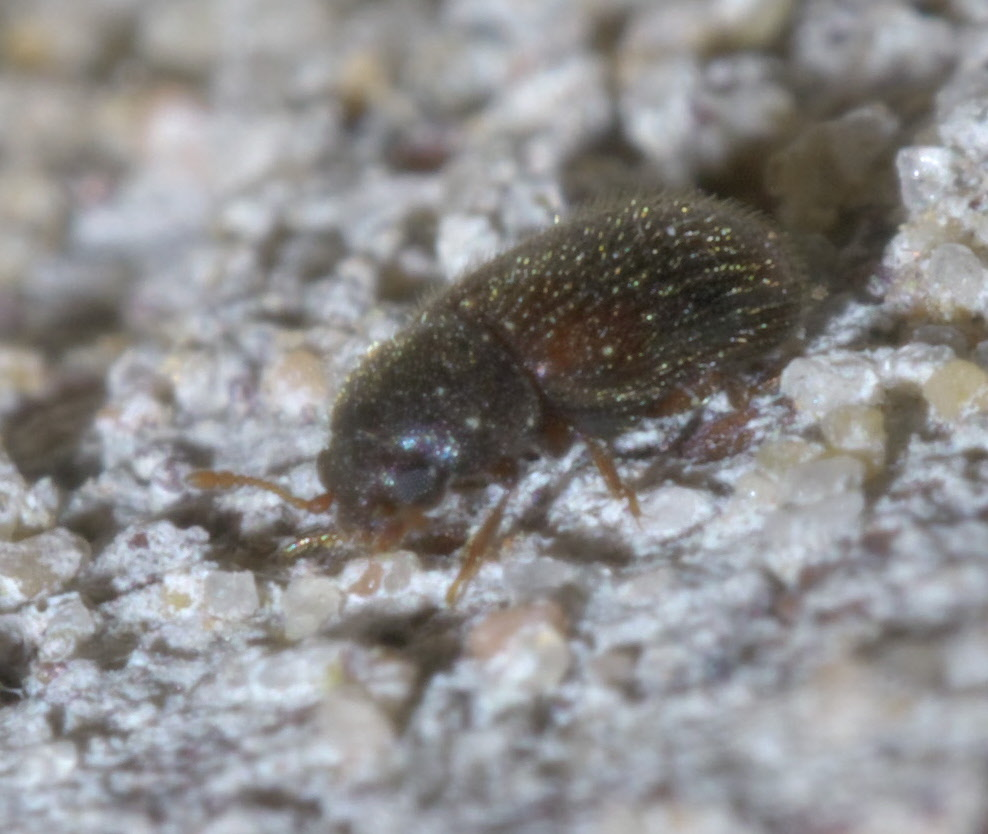
