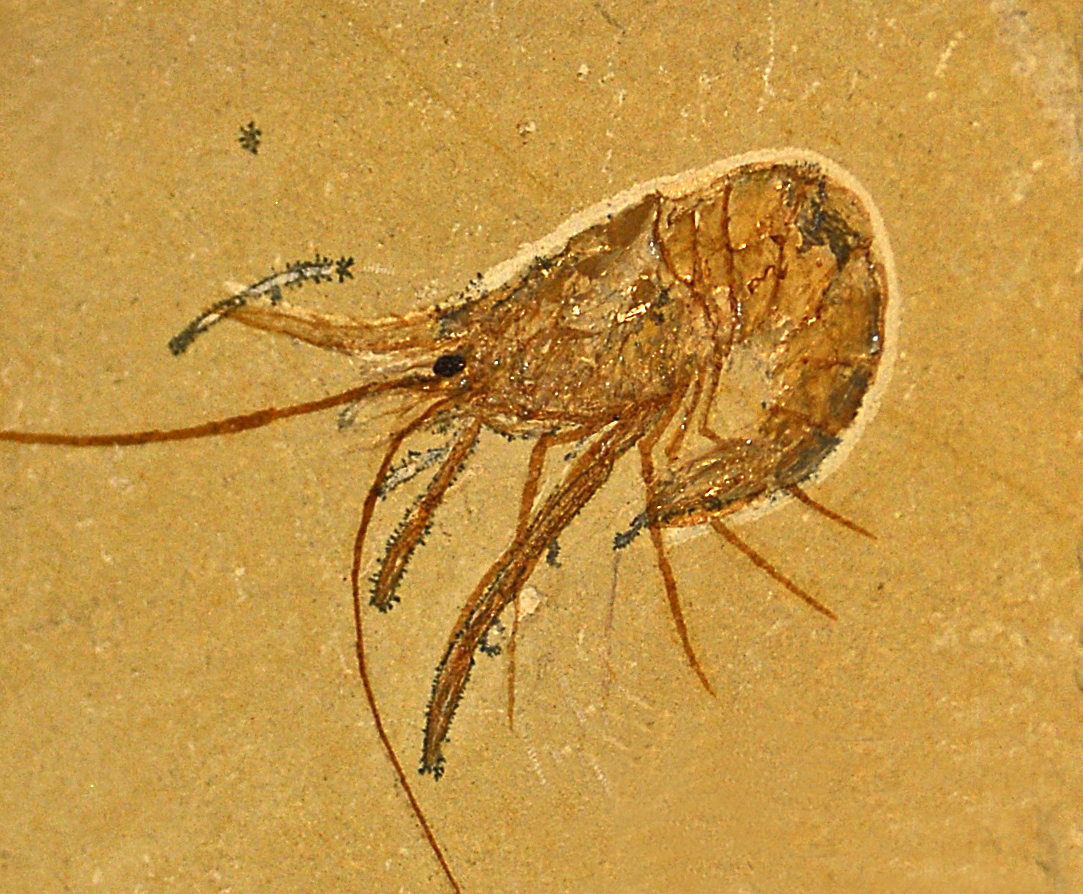
- Aeger libanensis from Liban

Scientific classification
- Domain: Eukaryota
- Kingdom: Animalia
- Phylum: Arthropoda
- Class: Malacostraca
- Order: Decapoda
- Suborder: Dendrobranchiata
- Family: †Aegeridae
- Genus: †Aeger
- Species: †A. libanensis

Binomial name
- †Aeger libanensis Roger 1946

= Aeger libanensis =

Aeger libanensis Temporal range: Late Cretaceous

Extinct species of crustacean

Aeger libanensis is a species of fossil prawn belonging to the family Aegeridae. These prawns had very long pereiopods.

== Fossil record ==
Fossils of Aeger libanensis are found in the Cenomanian (Late Cretaceous) marine outcrops at Hjoula and Mayfouq in Lebanon (age range: from 93.9 to 100.5 million years ago.).

== Bibliography ==
- Alessandro Garassino The macraran decapod crustaceans of the Upper Cretaceous of Lebanon
- Roger (J.), 1946 - Les invertébrés des couches à poissons du Crétacé supérieur du Liban. Mémoires de la Société géologique de France, t. 23, mém. 51, p. 1-92
- Víctor M. Bravo-Cuevas, Katia A. González-Rodríguez, Carlos Esquivel-Macías, Christopher Fielitz Advances on Stratigraphy and Paleontology of the Muhi Quarry from the Mid-Cretaceous (Albian-Cenomanian) of Hidalgo, Central Mexico
