= Aspidophorus =

Aspidophorus may refer to:

- Aspidophorus, a genus of beetles in the family Sphindidae, synonym of Aspidiphorus
- Aspidophorus, a genus of fishes in the family Agonidae, synonym of Agonus
- Aspidophorus, a genus of worms in the family Chaetonotidae, synonym of Aspidiophorus
