= Eurysphindus hirtus =

Scientific classification
- Kingdom: Animalia
- Phylum: Arthropoda
- Class: Insecta
- Order: Coleoptera
- Suborder: Polyphaga
- Infraorder: Cucujiformia
- Family: Sphindidae
- Genus: Eurysphindus
- Species: E. hirtus

Binomial name
- Eurysphindus hirtus LeConte, 1878

Species of beetle

Eurysphindus hirtus is a species of cryptic slime mold beetle in the family Sphindidae. It is found in North America.
