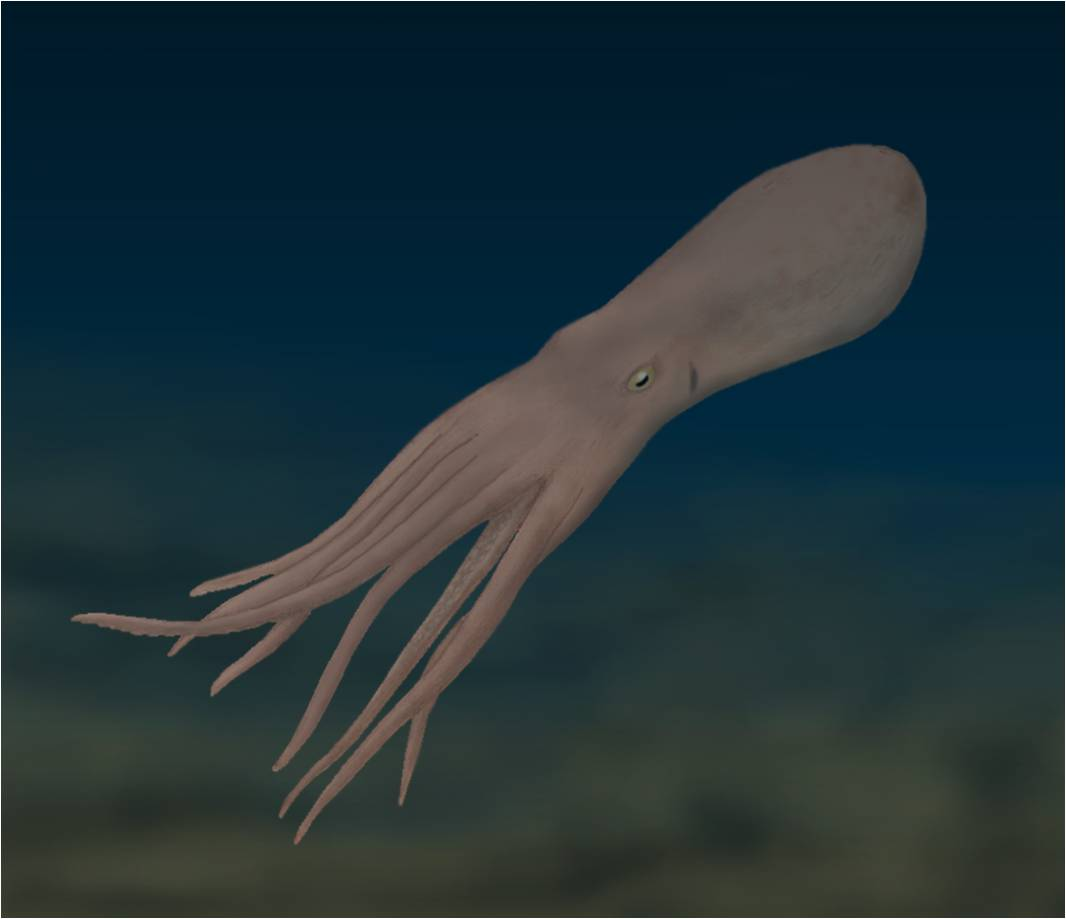
- K. levante

Scientific classification
- Kingdom: Animalia
- Phylum: Mollusca
- Class: Cephalopoda
- Order: Octopoda
- Family: †Palaeoctopodidae
- Genus: †Keuppia; Fuchs, Bracchi & Weis, 2009

Species
- K. hyperbolaris Fuchs, Bracchi & Weis, 2009; K. levante Fuchs, Bracchi & Weis, 2009

= Keuppia =

Keuppia Temporal range: 97–93 Ma Late Cenomanian

Extinct genus of octopuses

Keuppia is an extinct genus of octopus.

== Taxonomy ==
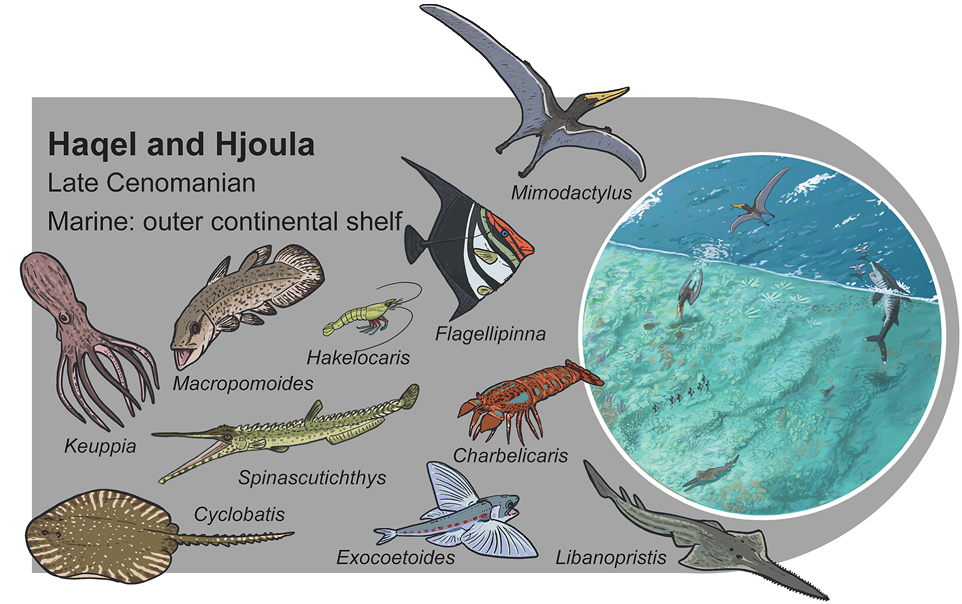
Fauna and depositional environment of the coeval Hakel and Hjoula localities, including Keuppia

It consists of two species, Keuppia hyperbolaris and Keuppia levante, both of which lived approximately 95 million years ago. Both species were found in fossilized form, which is very uncommon for extinct octopuses, as the soft tissue of dead octopuses almost always disintegrates before it has a chance to fossilize. These fossils, along with those of the genus Styletoctopus, were found from the Cretaceous-age Hâqel and Hjoula localities in Lebanon. The presence of a gladius vestige in this genus shows a transition from squid to octopus in which the inner shell has divided in two in early forms to eventually be reduced to lateralized stylets, as can be seen in Styletoctopus.

== See also ==
- 2009 extinct fossil octopus discoveries
