= Eurysphindus comatulus =

Scientific classification
- Domain: Eukaryota
- Kingdom: Animalia
- Phylum: Arthropoda
- Class: Insecta
- Order: Coleoptera
- Suborder: Polyphaga
- Infraorder: Cucujiformia
- Family: Sphindidae
- Genus: Eurysphindus
- Species: E. comatulus

Binomial name
- Eurysphindus comatulus McHugh, 1993

Species of beetle

Eurysphindus comatulus is a species of cryptic slime mold beetle in the family Sphindidae. It is found in North America.
