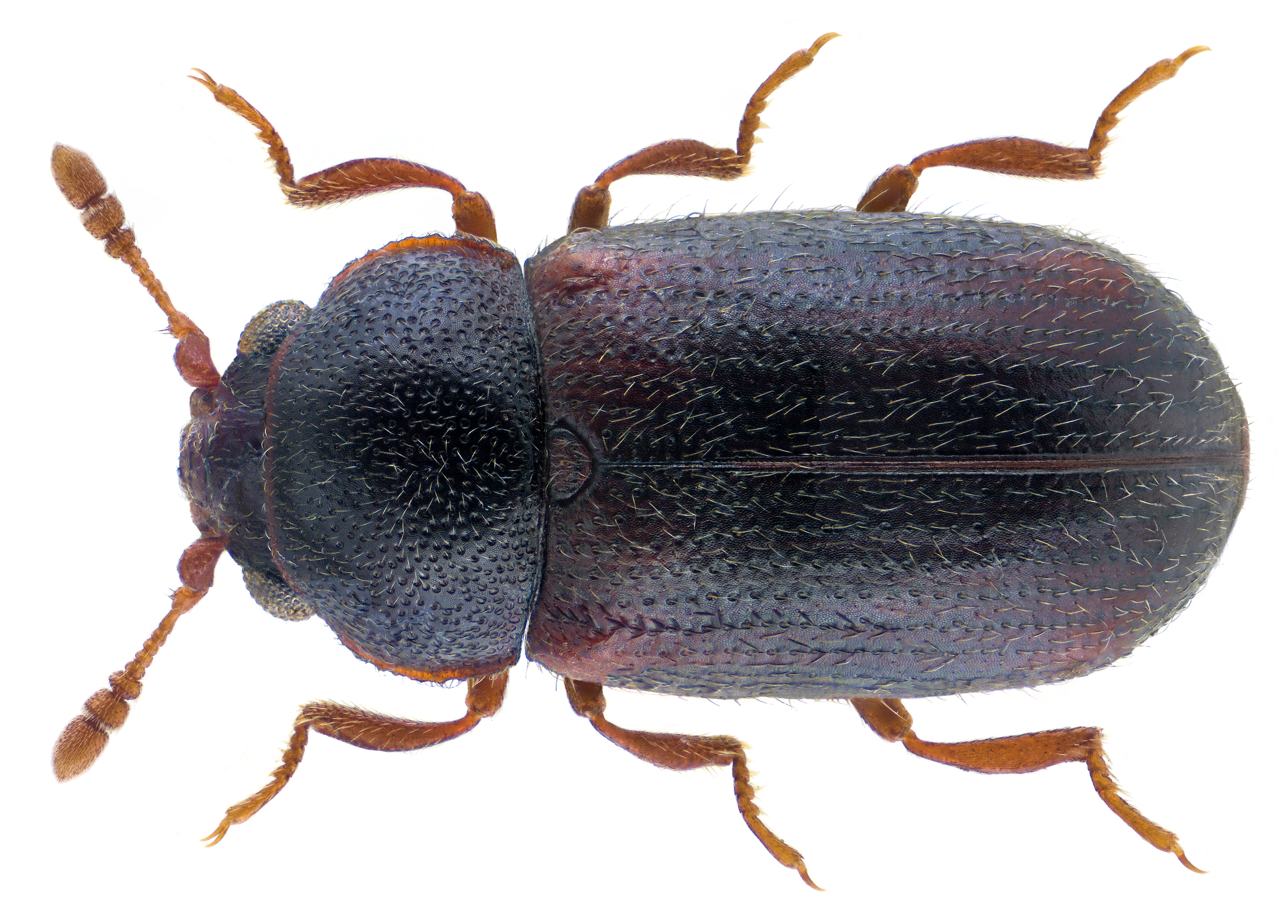
- Sphindus dubius

Scientific classification
- Kingdom: Animalia
- Phylum: Arthropoda
- Clade: Pancrustacea
- Class: Insecta
- Order: Coleoptera
- Suborder: Polyphaga
- Infraorder: Cucujiformia
- Family: Sphindidae
- Genus: Sphindus; Megerle, 1821

Type species
- Sphindus dubius (Gyllenhall, 1808)

= Sphindus =

Genus of beetles

Sphindus is a genus of cryptic slime mold beetles in the family Sphindidae. There are at least three described species in Sphindus.

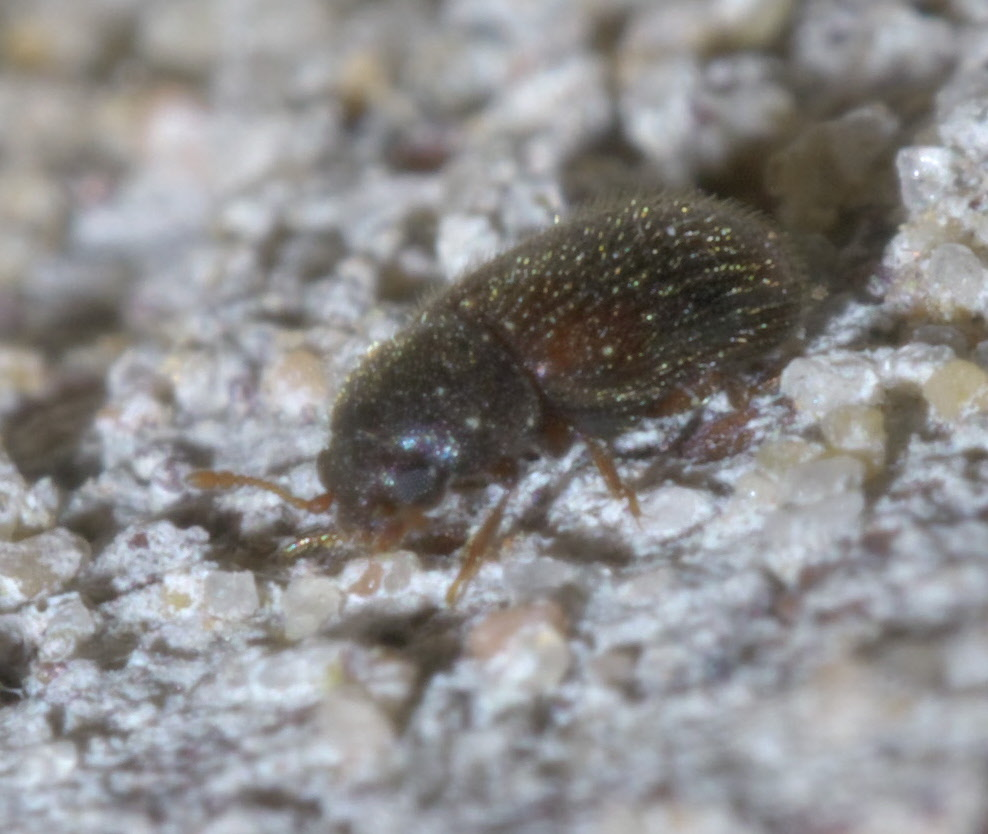
Sphindus americanus

== Species ==
Several species belong to the genus Sphindus:

- Sphindus americanus LeConte, 1866
- Sphindus crassulus Casey, 1898
- Sphindus dubius (Gyllenhall, 1808)
- Sphindus trinifer Casey, 1898
