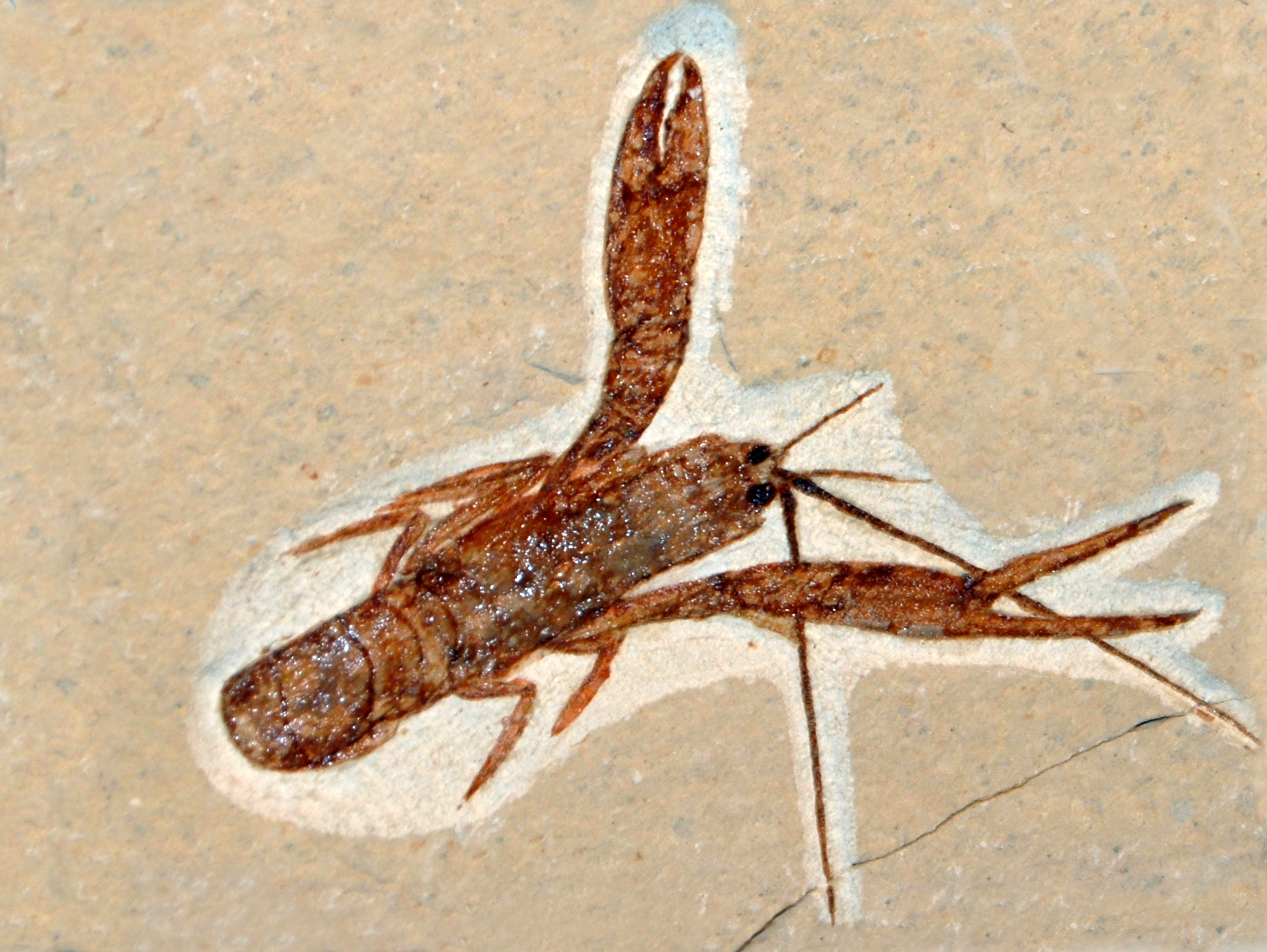
- Notahomarus. Cretaceous of Lebanon

Scientific classification
- Kingdom: Animalia
- Phylum: Arthropoda
- Class: Malacostraca
- Order: Decapoda
- Family: Nephropidae
- Genus: †Notahomarus Charbonnier, Audo, Garassino & Hyžný, 2017

Binomial name
- †Notahomarus hakelensis (Fraas, 1878)

Synonyms
- Homarus hakelensis (Fraas, 1878); "Pseudastacus" hakelensis (Fraas, 1878)

= Notahomarus =

Notahomarus Temporal range: Late Cretaceous, Cenomanian

Extinct species of crustacean that lived during the Cretaceous period

Notahomarus is a genus of fossil lobster belonging to the family Nephropidae that is known from fossils found only in Lebanon. The type species, N. hakelensis, was initially placed within the genus Homarus in 1878, but it was transferred to the genus Notahomarus in 2017.

== Fossil record ==
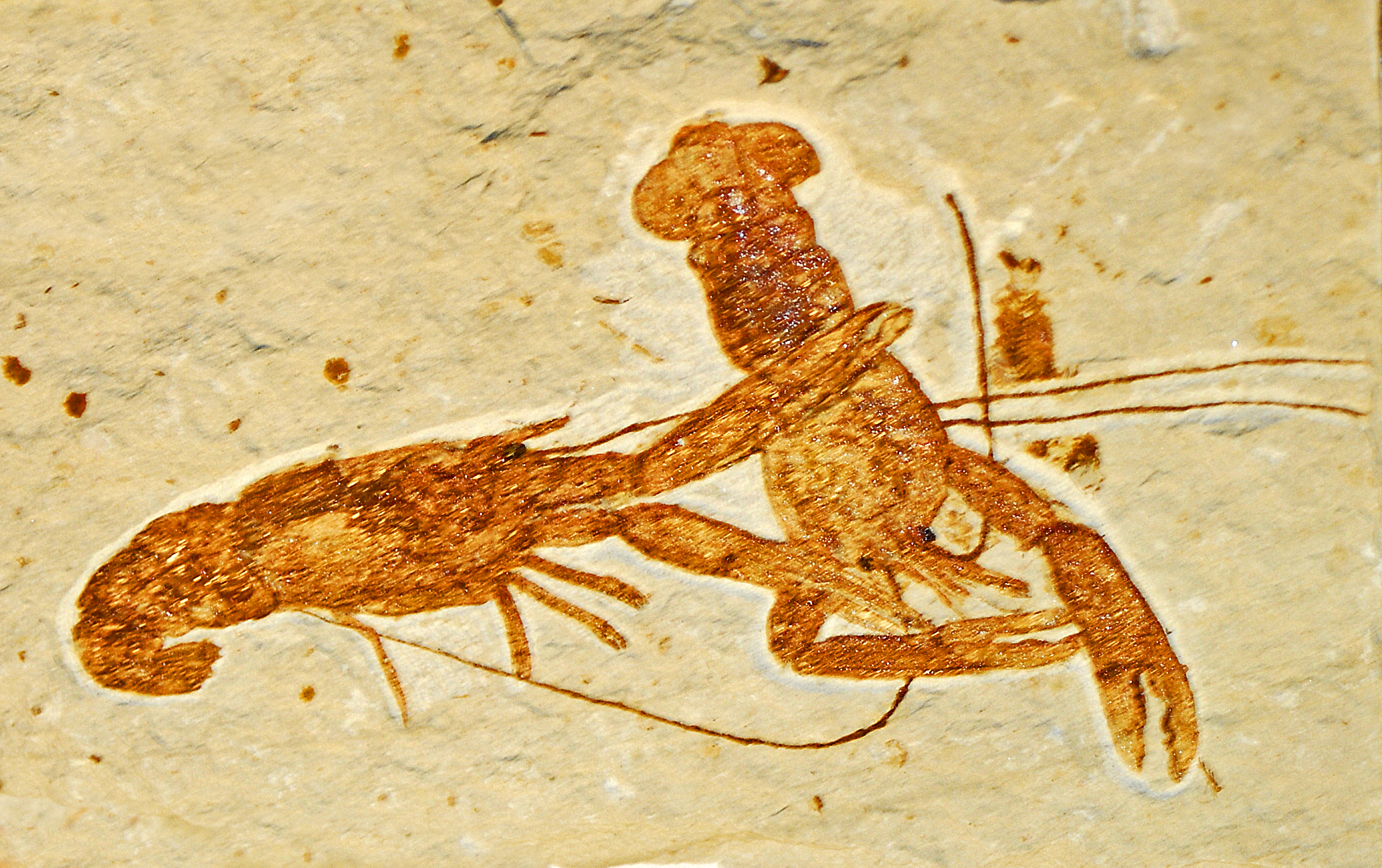
Fossils of Notahomarus

These lobsters are related to the modern-day lobsters. They lived in warm, shallow seas during the Cenomanian period (93.9–100.5 m.y.a.). Fossils have been found at fossil sites in Hjoula and Mayfouq, Lebanon.

== Description ==
Notahomarus could reach a length of about 95 millimetres (3.7 in), with 85 millimetres (3.3 in) antennae.
