= Carinisphindus =

Scientific classification
- Domain: Eukaryota
- Kingdom: Animalia
- Phylum: Arthropoda
- Class: Insecta
- Order: Coleoptera
- Suborder: Polyphaga
- Infraorder: Cucujiformia
- Family: Sphindidae
- Genus: Carinisphindus; McHugh, 1990

Genus of beetles

Carinisphindus is a genus of cryptic slime mold beetles in the family Sphindidae. There are about five described species in Carinisphindus.

== Species ==
These five species belong to the genus Carinisphindus:

- Carinisphindus geminus McHugh & Lewis, 2000
- Carinisphindus isthmensis McHugh
- Carinisphindus platysphinctos McHugh
- Carinisphindus purpuricephalus McHugh & Lewis, 2000
- Carinisphindus skotios McHugh & Lewis, 2000
