= Odontosphindus =

Scientific classification
- Kingdom: Animalia
- Phylum: Arthropoda
- Class: Insecta
- Order: Coleoptera
- Suborder: Polyphaga
- Infraorder: Cucujiformia
- Family: Sphindidae
- Genus: Odontosphindus; LeConte, 1878

Genus of beetles

Odontosphindus is a genus of cryptic slime mold beetles in the family Sphindidae. There are at least three described species in Odontosphindus.

== Species ==
These three species belong to the genus Odontosphindus:

- Odontosphindus clavicornis Casey, 1898
- Odontosphindus denticollis LeConte, 1878
- Odontosphindus grandis (Hampe, 1861)
