= Styletoctopus =

Styletoctopus Temporal range: 95 Ma

Scientific classification
- Kingdom: Animalia
- Phylum: Mollusca
- Class: Cephalopoda
- Order: Octopoda
- Family: Octopodidae
- Genus: †Styletoctopus
- Species: †S. annae

Binomial name
- †Styletoctopus annae Fuchs, Bracchi & Weis, 2009

Extinct genus of octopuses

Styletoctopus is an extinct genus of octopus. The genus consists of the single species Styletoctopus annae, which lived approximately 95 million years ago during the late Cenomanian, (early late Cretaceous). It was first discovered in 2009 by a team led by Dirk Fuchs of Freie University in the Hâqel and Hjoula localities in Lebanon. Very few octopus species appear in the fossil record, as octopuses consist of soft tissue that usually decomposes before it has time to fossilize.

== See also ==
- 2009 extinct fossil octopus discoveries
