= Eurysphindus =

Scientific classification
- Kingdom: Animalia
- Phylum: Arthropoda
- Class: Insecta
- Order: Coleoptera
- Suborder: Polyphaga
- Infraorder: Cucujiformia
- Family: Sphindidae
- Genus: Eurysphindus; LeConte, 1878

Genus of beetles

Eurysphindus is a genus of cryptic slime mold beetles in the family Sphindidae. There are about eight described species in Eurysphindus.

== Species ==
These eight species belong to the genus Eurysphindus:

- Eurysphindus bicolor Fisher
- Eurysphindus brasiliensis Sen Gupta & Crowson, 1979
- Eurysphindus comatulus McHugh, 1993
- Eurysphindus grandiclaviger McHugh, 1993
- Eurysphindus halli McHugh, 1993
- Eurysphindus hirtus LeConte, 1878
- Eurysphindus infuscus McHugh, 1993
- Eurysphindus plaumanni Sen Gupta & Crowson, 1979
