= Libanopsis =

Libanopsis Temporal range: Barremian

Scientific classification
- Kingdom: Animalia
- Phylum: Arthropoda
- Class: Insecta
- Order: Coleoptera
- Suborder: Polyphaga
- Infraorder: Cucujiformia
- Family: Sphindidae
- Genus: †Libanopsis; Kirejtshuk, 2015

Species
- L. impexa; L. limosa; L. poinari (type); L. slipinskii; L. straminea

Genus of beetles

Libanopsis is a genus of extinct cryptic slime mold beetles in the family Sphindidae. It was described from fossils preserved in Lebanese amber. Libanopsis lived in Lebanon in the Early Cretaceous.

== Taxonomy ==
Libanopsis is the only genus in the subfamily Libanopsinae. The genus consists of 5 species:

- Libanopsis impexa
- Libanopsis limosa
- Libanopsis poinari
- Libanopsis slipinskii
- Libanopsis straminea.
