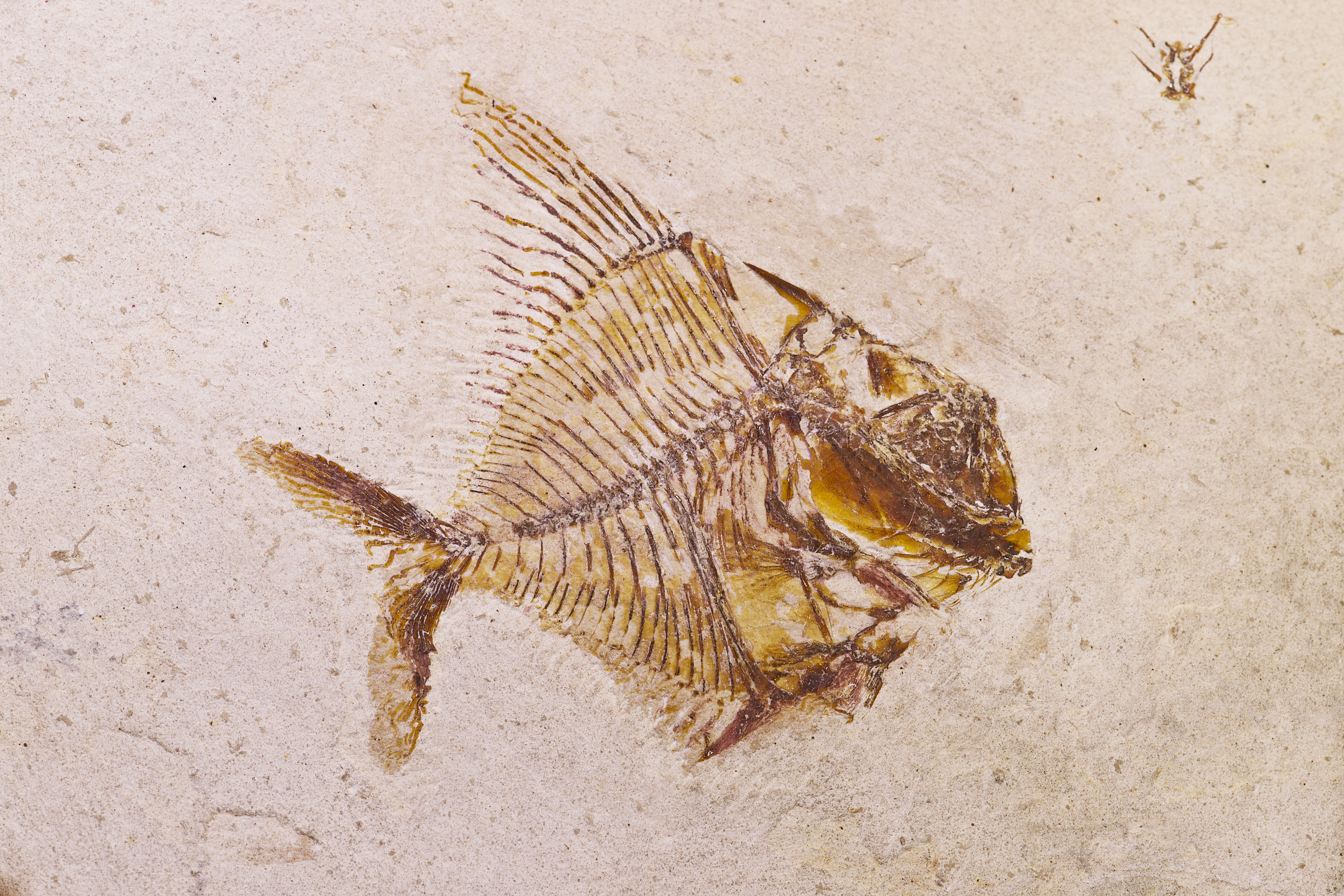
- A. minor (Pictet 1850)

Scientific classification
- Kingdom: Animalia
- Phylum: Chordata
- Class: Actinopterygii
- Family: †Aipichthyidae
- Genus: †Aipichthys; Steindachner, 1860

Species
- See text

= Aipichthys =

Aipichthys Temporal range: Cenomanian, 97–93 Ma

Extinct genus of fishes

Aipichthys is an extinct genus of bony fish that is possibly polyphyletic. Formerly classified in the Polymixiiformes, it is now thought to be a distant relative of oarfish and opahs.

== Species ==
Five species have traditionally placed within Aipichthys, but a redescription of the type species in 2016 suggested the genus to be polyphyletic, with only the type species as a member of the genus. The other four species were not moved out of the genus by the authors and were referred as `Aipichthys`.

- Aipichthys pretiosus Steindachner, 1860 (Komen Limestone, Volčji Grad, Komen, Slovenia) (type species)
- Aipichthys minor (Pictet, 1850) (Hakel and Hjoula, Lebanon)
- Aipichthys nuchalis (Dixon, 1850) (Upper Cenomanian English Chalk, Washington, Sussex, UK)
- Aipichthys oblongus Gayet, 1980 (Hakel and Hjoula, Lebanon)
- Aipichthys velifer Woodward, 1901 (Hakel and Hjoula, Lebanon)
