= Aspidiphorus =

Scientific classification
- Kingdom: Animalia
- Phylum: Arthropoda
- Class: Insecta
- Order: Coleoptera
- Suborder: Polyphaga
- Infraorder: Cucujiformia
- Family: Sphindidae
- Subfamily: Sphindinae
- Genus: Aspidiphorus; Ziegler, 1821

Synonyms
- Arpidiphorus Dejean, 1821; Coniporus C.G.Thomson, 1859

Genus of beetles

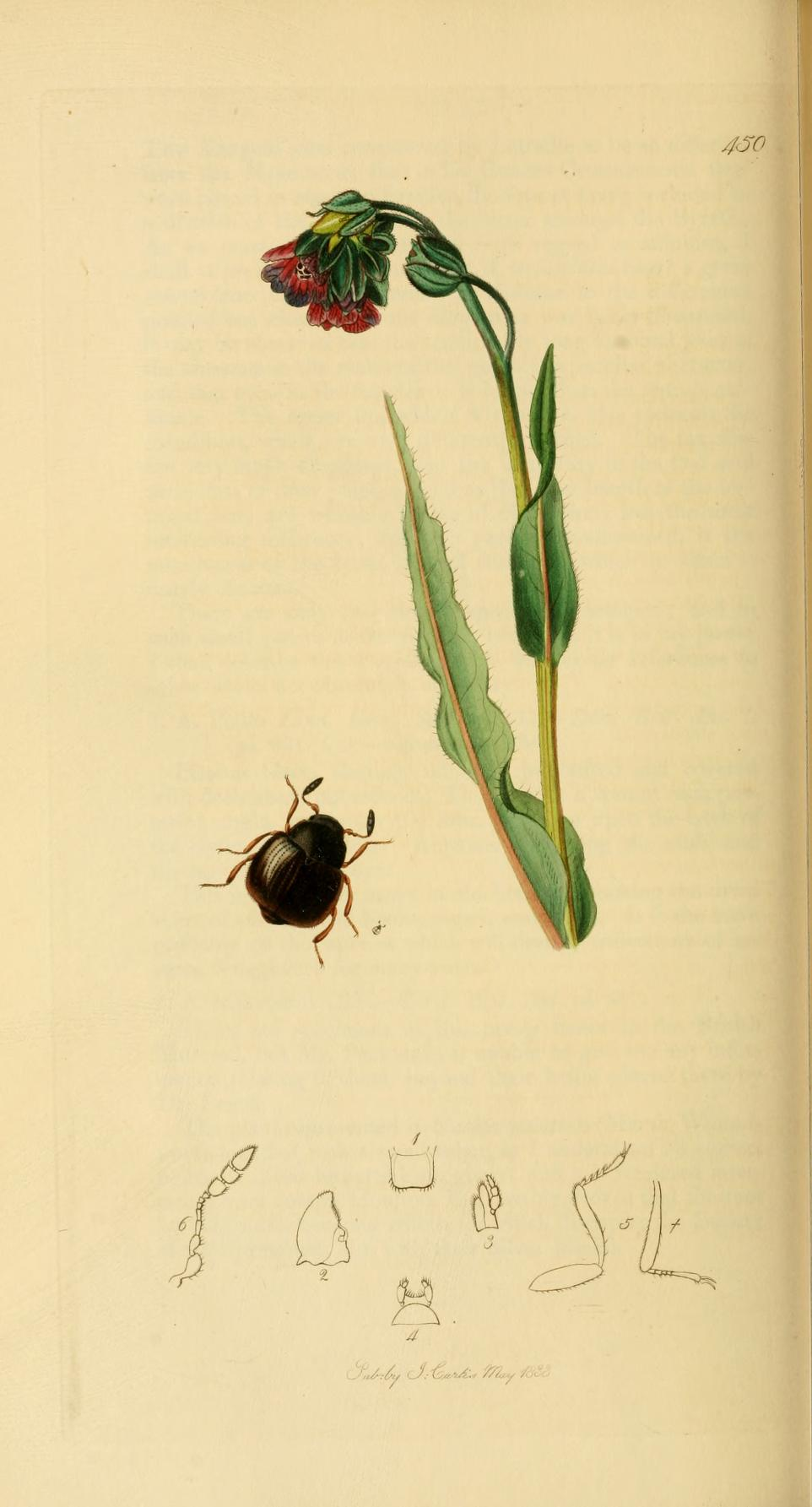
Aspidophorus orbiculatus (illustration)

Aspidiphorus is a genus of beetles belonging to the family Sphindidae.

The genus was first described by Ziegler in 1821.

Species:

- Aspidiphorus lareyniei Duval, 1859
- Aspidiphorus orbiculatus (Gyllenhal, 1808)
