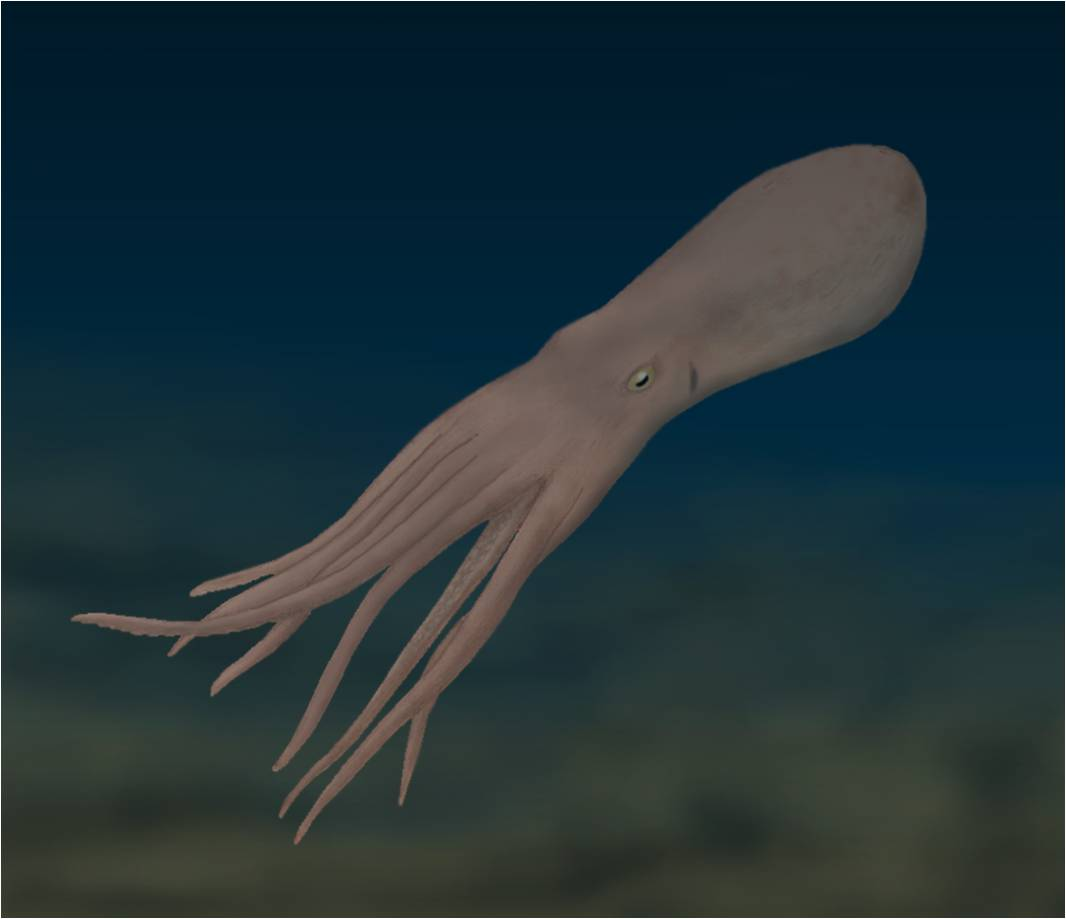
- Life restoration of Keuppia levante

Scientific classification
- Kingdom: Animalia
- Phylum: Mollusca
- Class: Cephalopoda
- Order: Octopoda
- Family: †Palaeoctopodidae; Dollo, 1912

Genera
- †Keuppia; †Palaeoctopus

= Palaeoctopodidae =

Palaeoctopodidae Temporal range: Cenomanian-Santonian

Extinct family of octopuses

Palaeoctopodidae is an extinct family of incirrate octopuses that lived during the Late Cretaceous. It includes two genera, Keuppia and Palaeoctopus.
