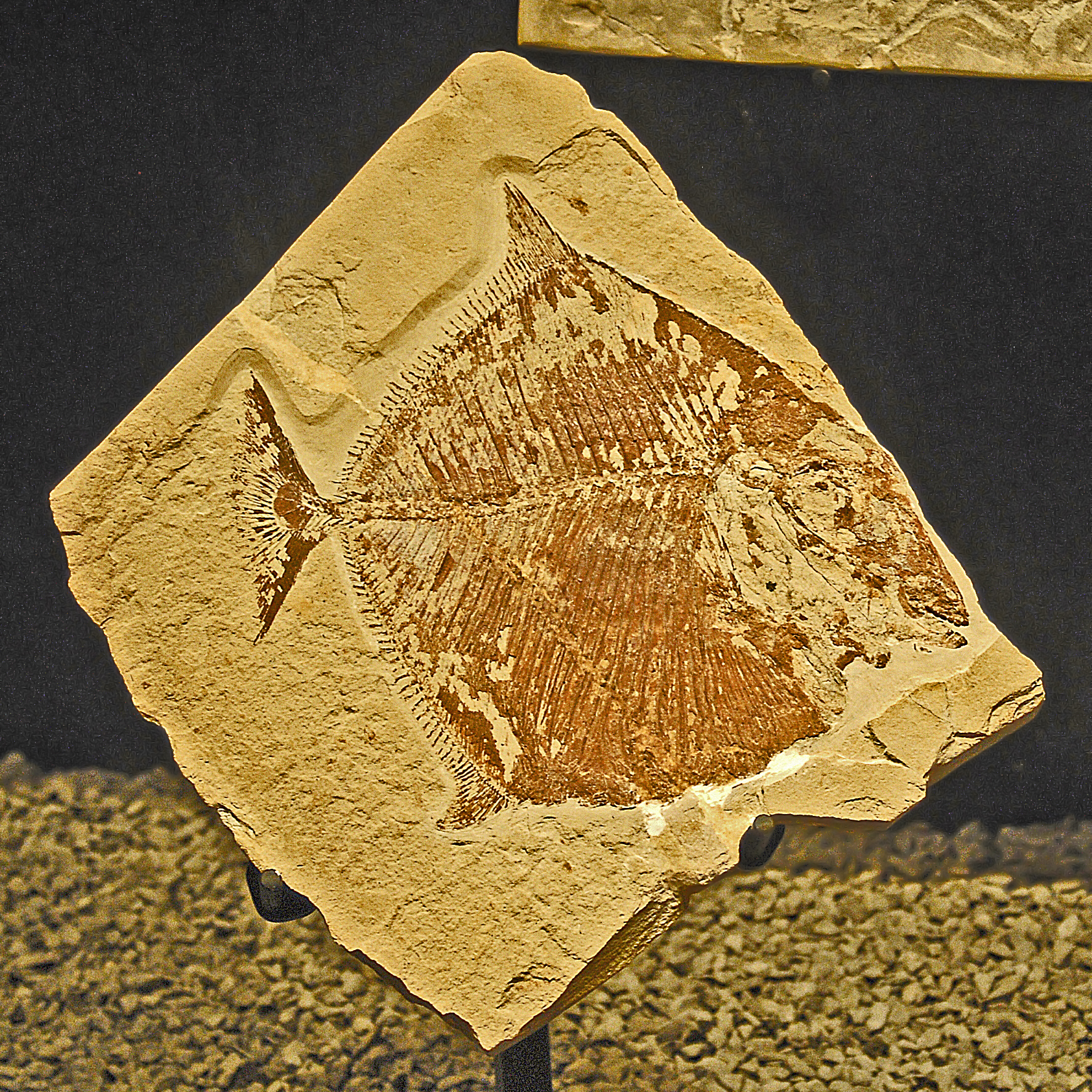
- Palaeobalistum goedeli from Lebanon. Cretaceous (abt. 95 Ma)

Scientific classification
- Kingdom: Animalia
- Phylum: Chordata
- Class: Actinopterygii
- Order: †Pycnodontiformes
- Family: †Pycnodontidae
- Genus: †Palaeobalistum
- Species: †P. goedeli

Binomial name
- †Palaeobalistum goedeli Heckel 1856

Synonyms
- Nursallia goedeli (Heckel, 1854) Blot, 1987

= Palaeobalistum goedeli =

Palaeobalistum goedeli Temporal range: Cretaceous

Extinct species of fish

Palaeobalistum goedeli is an extinct species of prehistoric ray-finned fish that lived during the Cretaceous period.

Fossils of this species have been found in Lebanon in the sediments of the Cenomanian Age (99.6 - 93.5 million years ago).

== Description ==
Palaeobalistum goedeli can reach a length of about 220 millimetres (8.7 in) and a height of about 200 millimetres (7.9 in). Body is laterally compressed with an almost circular outline and a large snout. Teeth are columnar and thick, indicating a durophagous existence, breaking shells and crustaceans.
