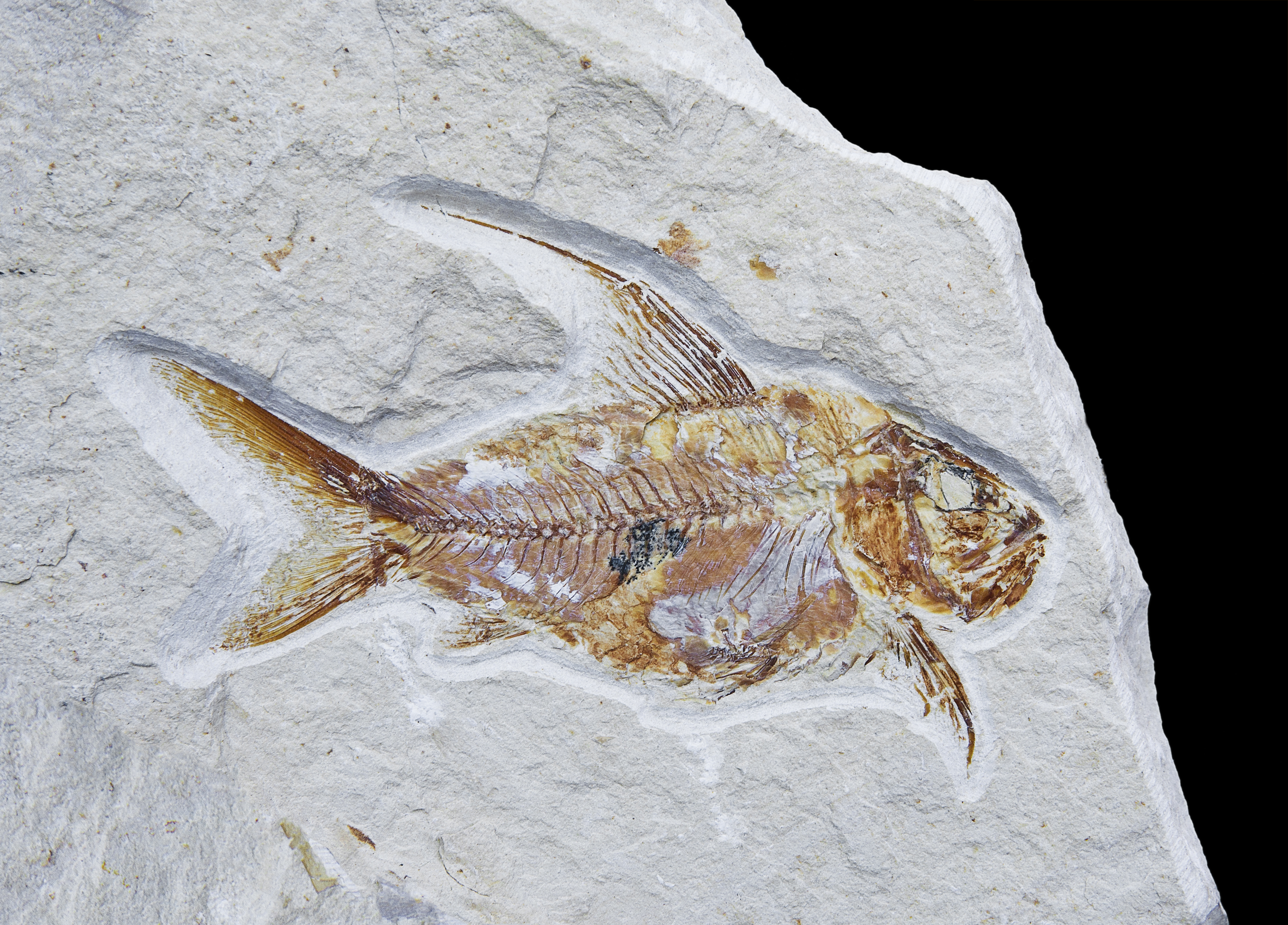
- Nematonotus longispinus in Cenomanian from Lebanon

Scientific classification
- Kingdom: Animalia
- Phylum: Chordata
- Class: Actinopterygii
- Division: Teleostei
- Order: Aulopiformes
- Family: Aulopidae
- Genus: †Nematonotus; Woodward, 1899

= Nematonotus =

Nematonotus Temporal range: Lower Cenomanian

Extinct genus of ray-finned fishes

Nematonotus is an extinct genus of prehistoric ray-finned fish that lived during the Lower Cenomanian.
