= Mayfouq =

Mayfouq ميفوق Maifouk
- village
- Location within Lebanon
- Coordinates: 34°10′57″N 35°46′19″E
- Country: Lebanon
- Governorate: Keserwan-Jbeil
- District: Byblos

Area
  - Total: 5.88 km^{2} (2.27 sq mi)
- Highest elevation: 1,100 m (3,600 ft)
- Lowest elevation: 800 m (2,600 ft)
- Time zone: UTC+2 (EET)
  - Summer (DST): UTC+3 (EEST)
- Dialing code: +9619
- Website: www.mayfouq.com

Mayfouq (/ˌmeɪˈfuːk/; Arabic: ميفوق, romanized: Mayfūq) is a village and municipality in the Byblos District of Keserwan-Jbeil Governorate, Lebanon. It is located 64 km north of Beirut. Mayfouq has an average elevation of 860 meters above sea level and its total land area is 588 hectares. Its inhabitants are predominantly Maronite Catholics.

Mayfouq is often praised for its natural environment and wildlife, and has large areas of forestry. It has been a common location for sight-seeing tourists who wish to look at wild animals such as hyenas and foxes.

Mayfouq has a municipality as of 1998 and the current president is Mr. Hady Hachach Educational institutions in Mayfouq include the convent primary school and a secondary school.

Mayfouq was the third Maronite Patriarchal location in Lebanon. There are a number of churches in the village, including Our Lady of Ilige, Our Lady of Mayfouq, Mart Moura, Al Sayde Kfarchelli, and many other deserted churches such Mar Saba, St Georges (Mar Girgis). Convents include Our Lady of Mayfouq Convent and Mar Challita Convent (Kattara), which are under the patronage of the Lebanese Maronite Order.

The village is also home to the Achtarout Club (Arabic: نادي عشتروت الرياضي), which was founded by Joseph Noon, Mayfouq's team won several trophies and was champion of the Byblos clubs tournament in volleyball for four years.
