= Hjoula =

Hjoula حجولا
- Location in Lebanon
- Coordinates: 34°08′00″N 35°44′43″E
- Country: Lebanon
- Governorate: Keserwan-Jbeil
- District: Byblos

Area
  - Total: 5.28 km^{2} (2.04 sq mi)
- Elevation: 1,000 m (3,300 ft)

Hjoula (Arabic: حجولا, romanized: Ḥjūlā) is a municipality in the Byblos District of Keserwan-Jbeil Governorate, Lebanon. It is 70 kilometres (43 mi) north of Beirut. Hjoula has an elevation of between 920 and 1,100 m (3,020 and 3,610 ft) above sea level. Hjoula has a total land area of 528 hectares (1,300 acres). The village of Hjoula is known for its fertile soil and its woods, as well as Late Cretaceous fossils.

== Etymology ==
The word is an Aramaic one, however the meaning is uncertain. Most historians and linguists suggest it means "Oval" due to its oval shape, while some others speculate it comes from the Syriac root "G-l-a" and subsequently to the word "Guola" which supposedly means "The place of the wandering salesman".

Hjoula, a village in the Byblos region, has been influenced by various civilizations throughout history. Originally a pagan village, Hjoula was part of the ancient Phoenician culture, which was known for its polytheistic beliefs and rituals. Over time, the village experienced the presence of several civilizations, including the Egyptians, Assyrians, Persians, and Romans, each leaving their mark. During the Islamic conquests, Hjoula became predominantly Shiite, a heritage that continues today.

Jibra'el Hjoula, the 104th Maronite Patriarch, immigrated to Hjoula while in hiding. He was later martyred by the Mamluks around 1367 CE in Tripoli.

== Population ==
The village has a population of around 1200 inhabitants.

== Geology ==
Rock quarries near the village working Cretaceous age marine strata of the Sannine Formation have produced a number of new fish and crustacean species along with rare cephalopods.

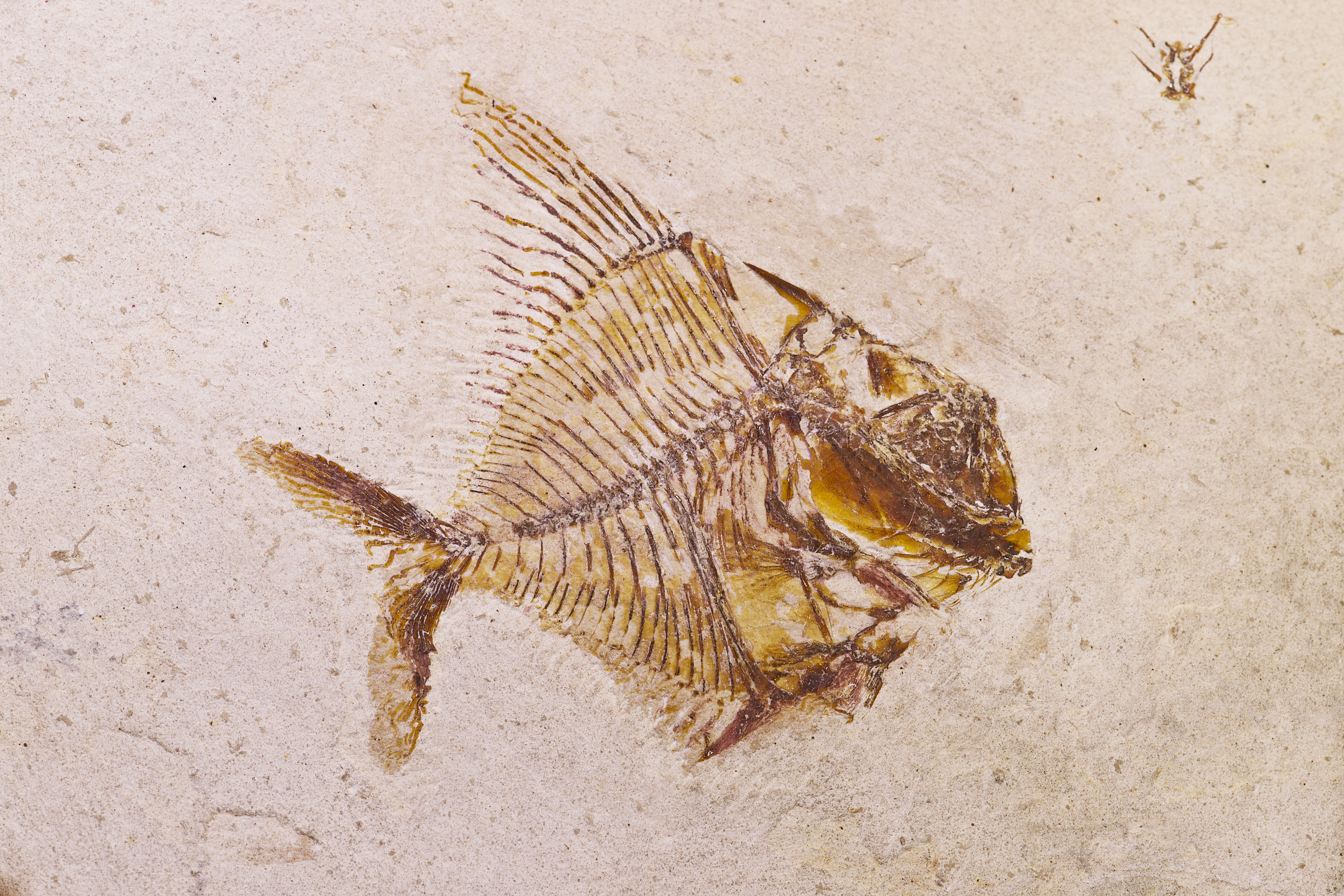
Aipichthys minor fish

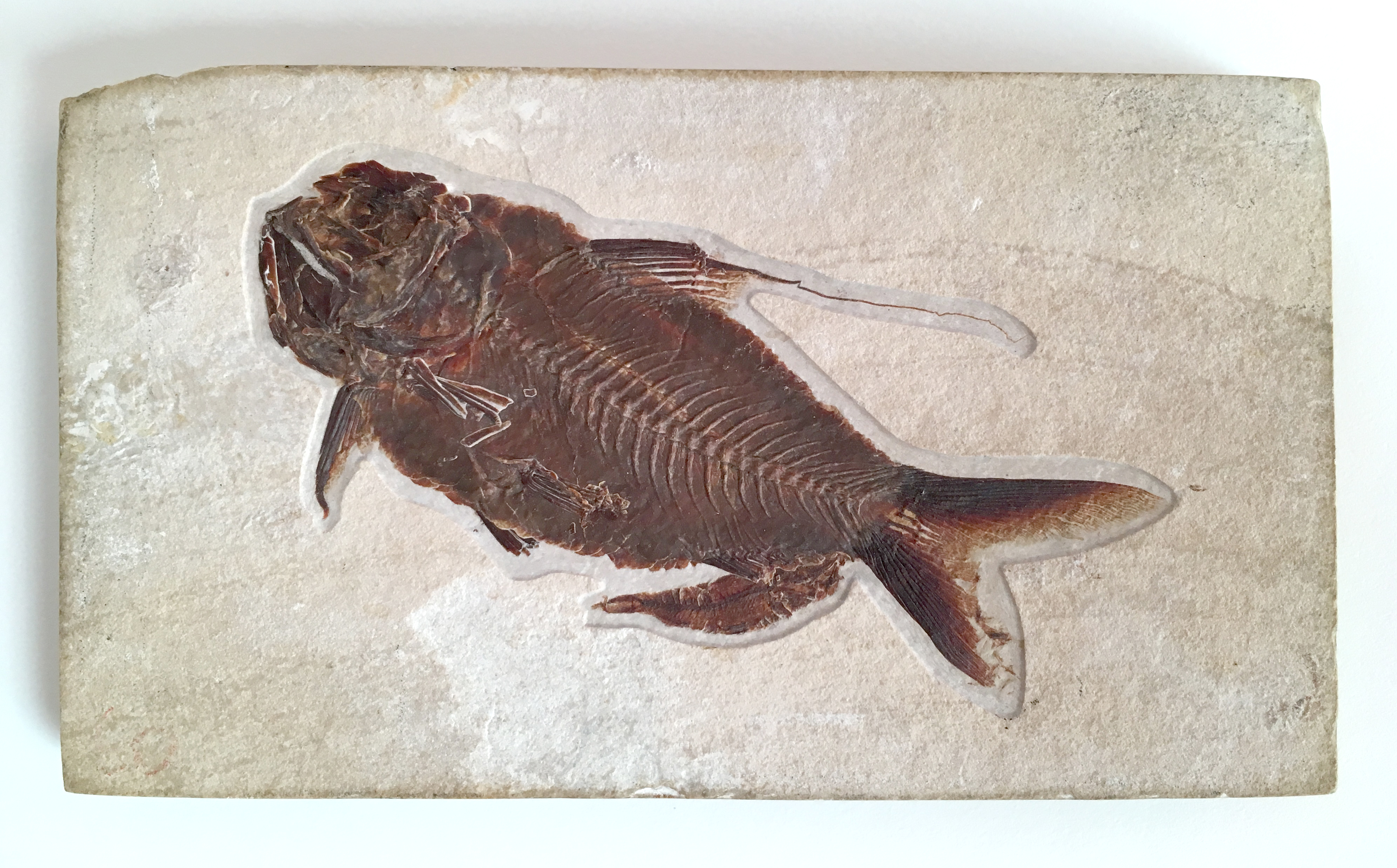
Nematonotus species fish

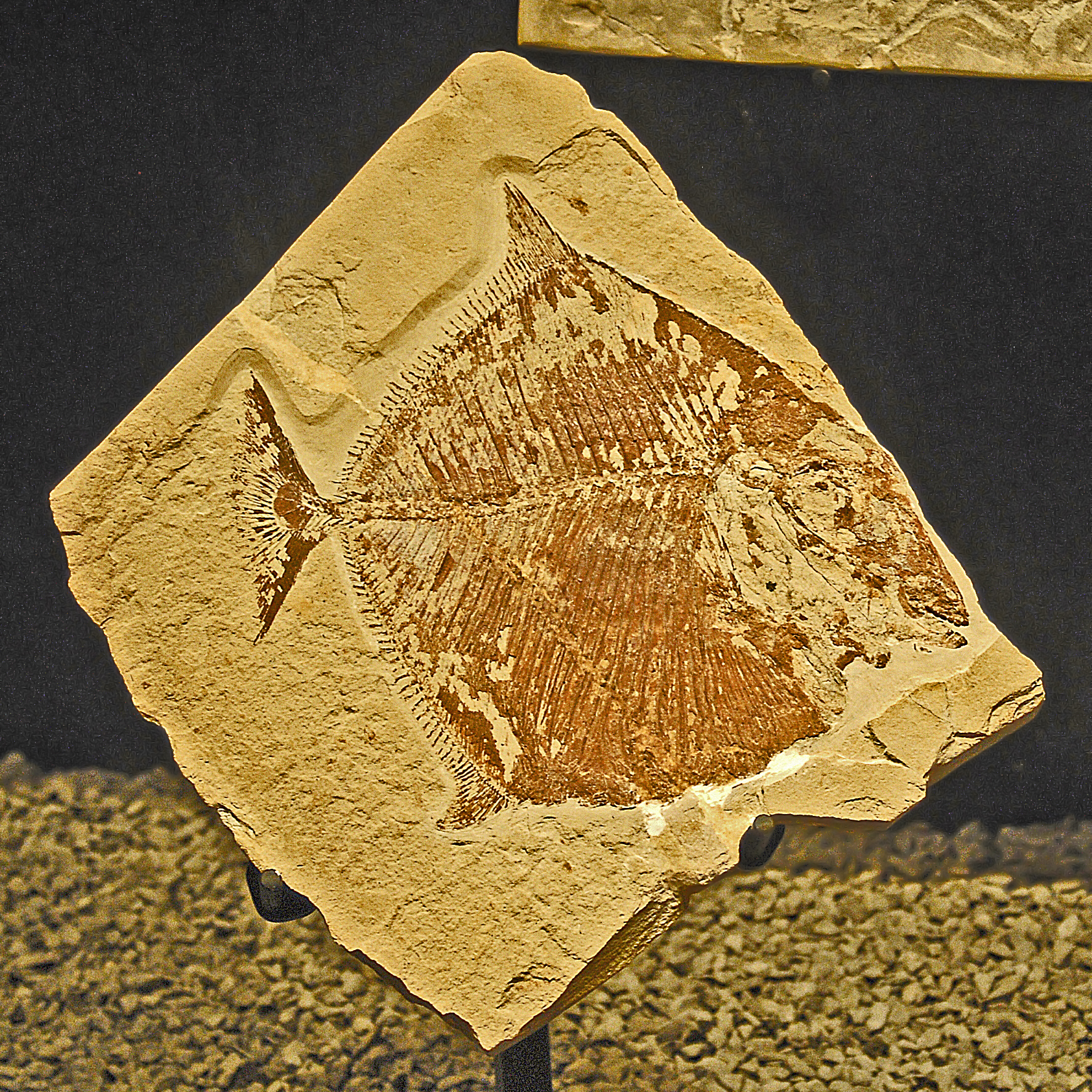
Palaeobalistum goedeli fish

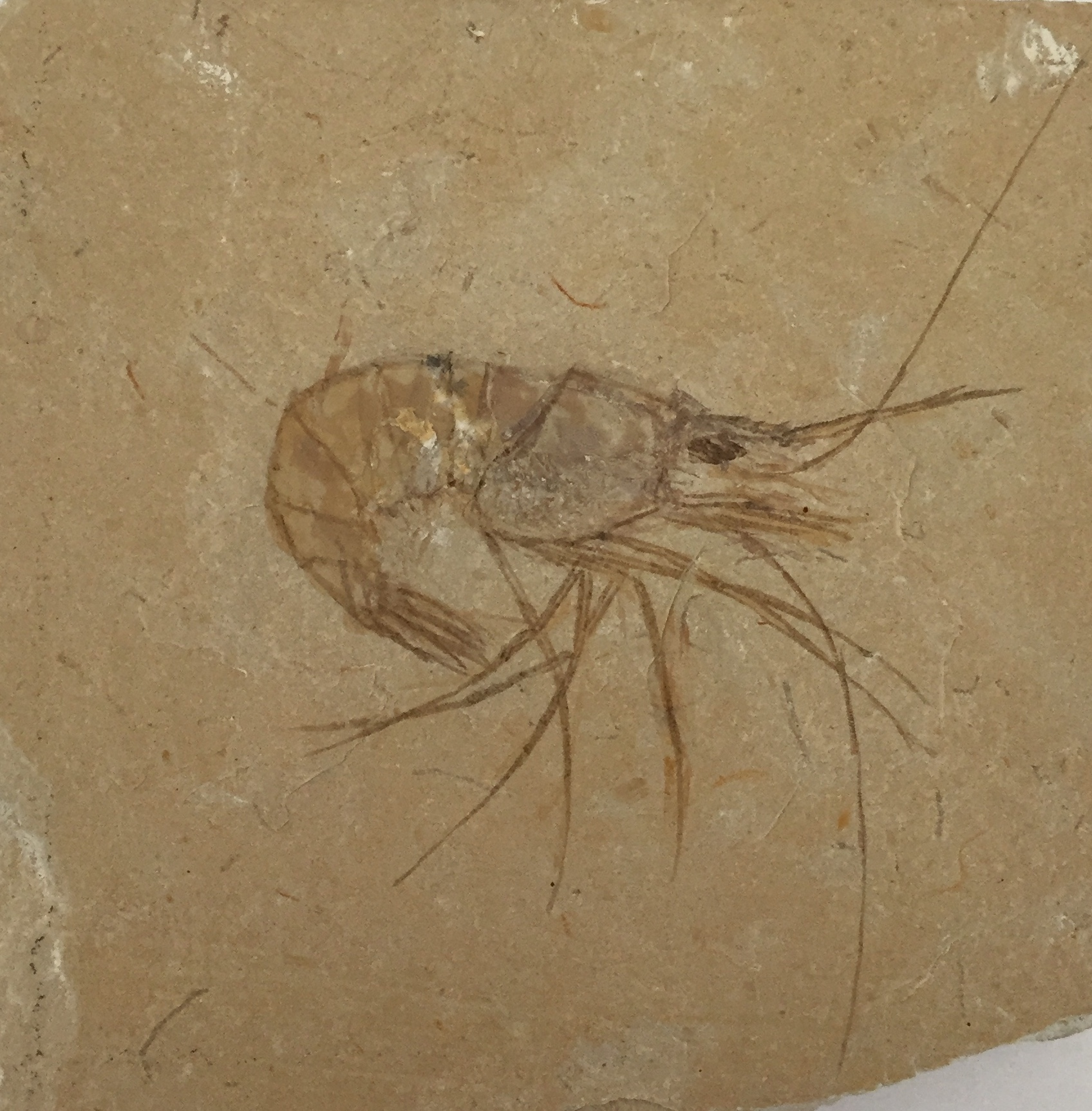
Carpopenaeus callirostris shrimp

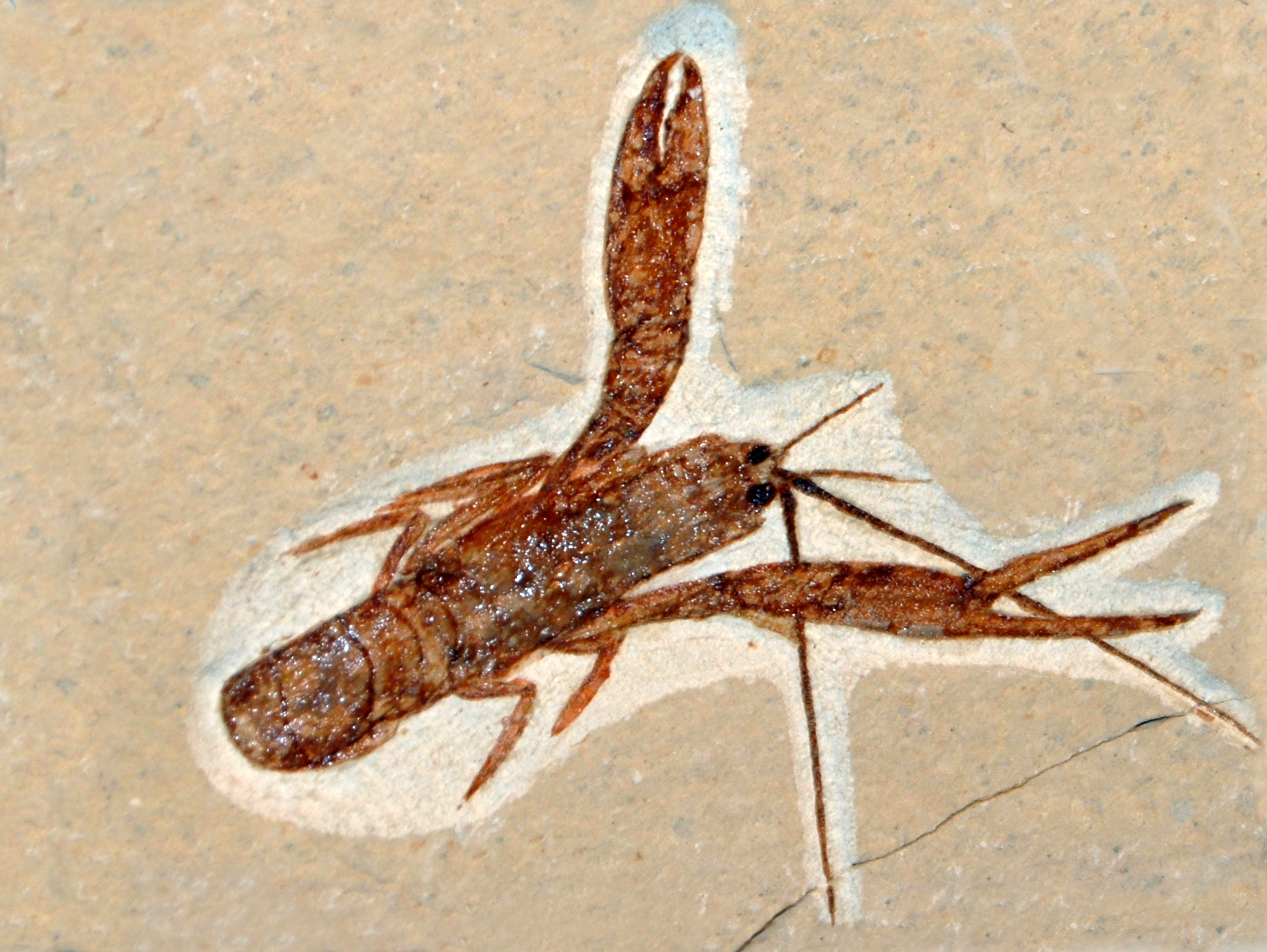
Homarus hakelensis lobster

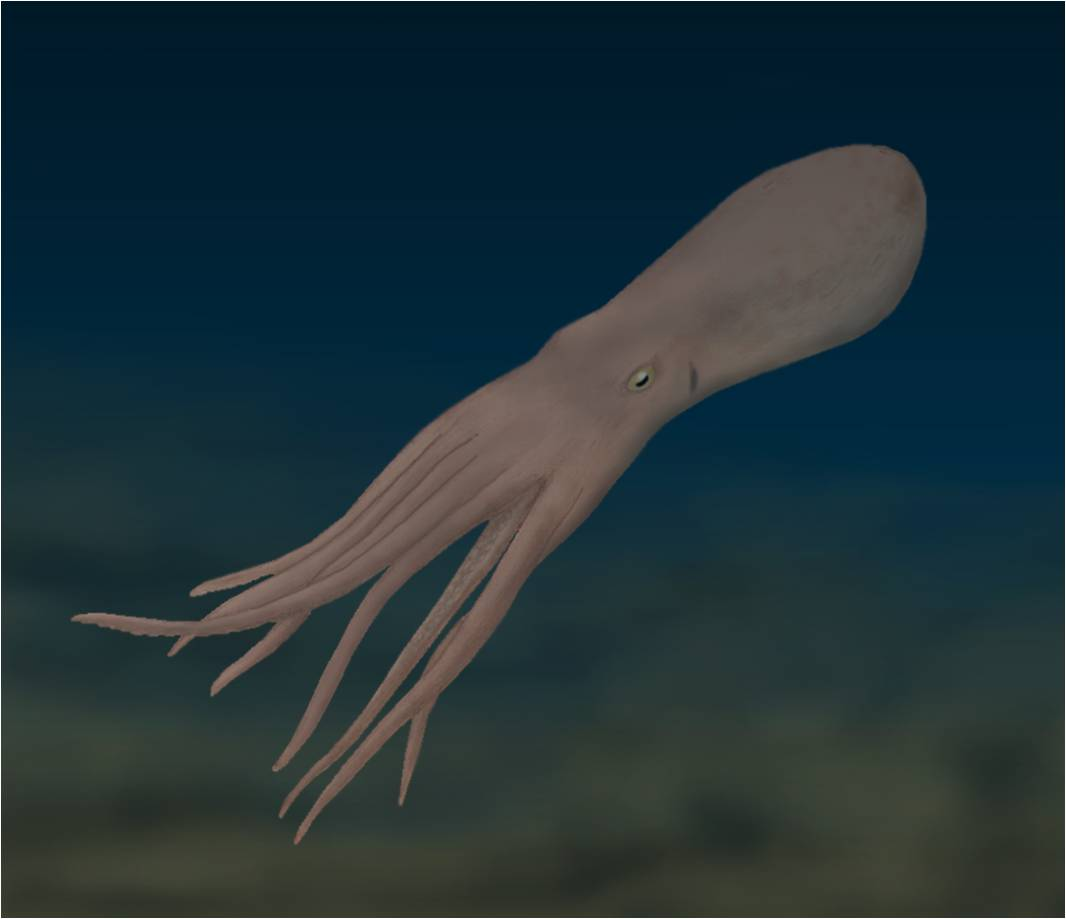
Artist's reconstruction of Keuppia levante
