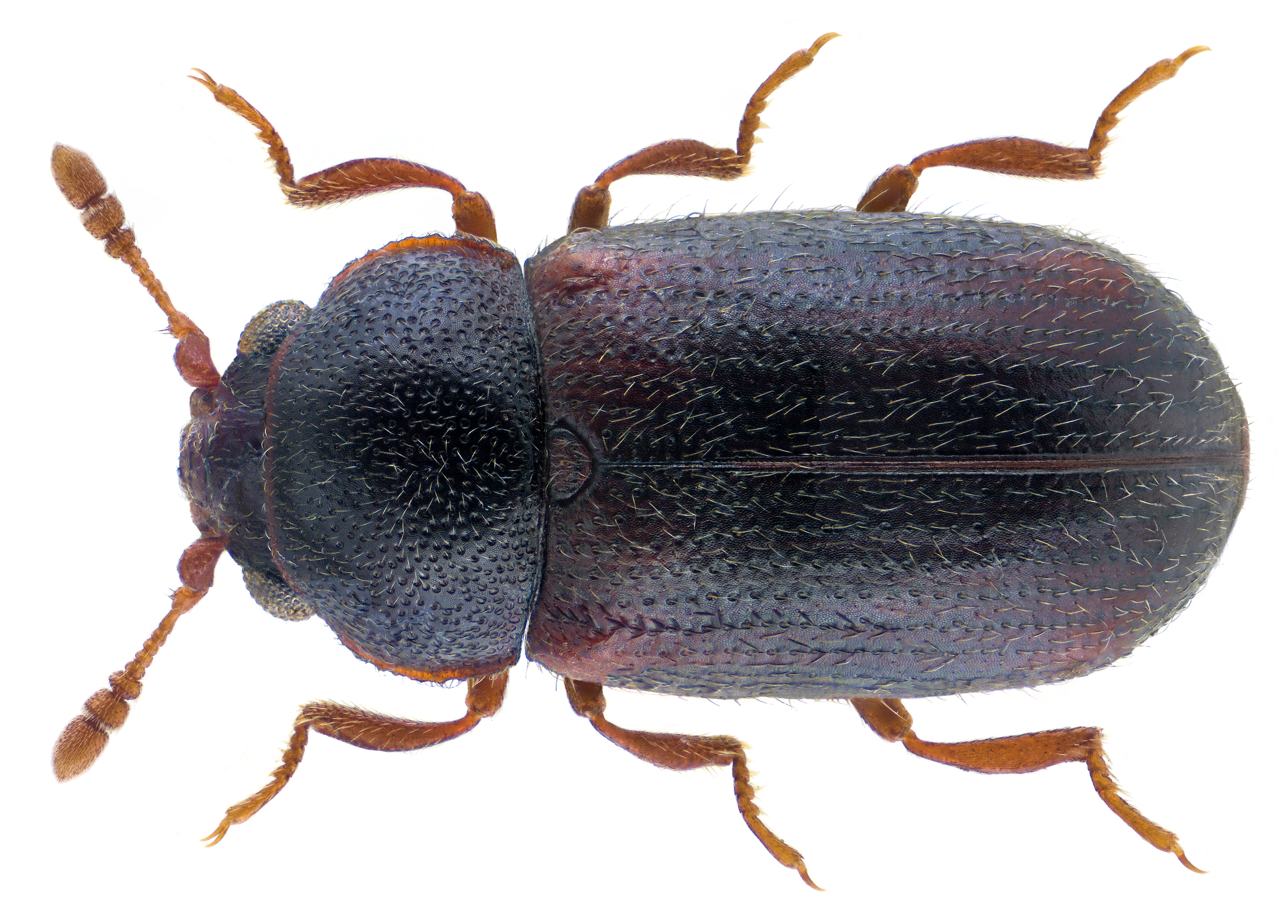
- Sphindus dubius

Scientific classification
- Kingdom: Animalia
- Phylum: Arthropoda
- Clade: Pancrustacea
- Class: Insecta
- Order: Coleoptera
- Suborder: Polyphaga
- Infraorder: Cucujiformia
- Superfamily: Cucujoidea
- Family: Sphindidae; Jacquelin du Val, 1858

Subfamilies and Genera
- See text

= Sphindidae =

Sphindidae Temporal range: Mid-Barremian - Recent

Family of beetles

Sphindidae is a family of beetles, in the suborder Polyphaga. They are called slime mold beetles due to their exclusive feeding on slime molds during adult and larval stages, other aspects of their life history are obscure. Palaeontological discoveries since 2015 have added to the geologic history of Sphindidae, including the discovery of Libanopsis, placed in the extinct subfamily Libanopsinae.

== Genera ==
Eight living genera are placed in Sphindidae:

- Aspidiphorus Latreille, 1829
- Carinisphindus McHugh, 1990
- Eurysphindus LeConte, 1878
- Genisphindus McHugh, 1993
- Odontosphindus LeConte, 1878
- Protosphindus Sen Gupta and Crowson, 1979
- Sphindiphorus Sen Gupta and Crowson, 1979
- Sphindus Megerle in Dejean, 1821 (cryptic slime mold beetles)
- †Trematosphindus Li & Cai, 2021, Burmese amber, Myanmar, and Taimyr amber, Russia; Late Cretaceous (Cenomanian)
- †Burmops Kirejtshuk et al. 2019 Burmese amber, Myanmar, Late Cretaceous (Cenomanian)

Additionally the extinct subfamily Libanopsinae contains the genus Libanopsis encompassing five species from Cretaceous Lebanese amber.
