= Haqel =

Settlement in Lebanon

Coordinates: 34°10′15″N 35°45′02″E

Haqel (Arabic: حاقل, romanized: Ḥāqel), also spelled Hakel, is a municipality in the Byblos District of Keserwan-Jbeil Governorate, Lebanon. It is a predominantly Maronite settlement.

== History ==
In 1991, Lebanon's first natural history museum for marine fossils was founded in Haqel. Most of the initial collection was discovered by the museum's founder, Rizkallah Nohra, on his family's land within the town. The fossils have been dated to the Cenomanian Age, approximately 98 million years ago.

== Demographics ==
As of 2022, there were 370 registered voters (29 of whom were diaspora voters), 96.2% of whom were Maronites.

== Landmarks ==
- St. Mary's Church
- St. Sassine Church: Church is named after the town's patron saint.
- Expo Hakel: a marine fossil museum

== Notable residents ==
- Abraham Ecchellensis (1605–1664), was born in the village as Ibrahim al-Haqilani. A Maronite philosopher best known for helping to translating the Bible into Arabic.
