= Sannine Formation =

Geologic formation in Lebanon

- Stratigraphic range: Late Cenomanian; ~95–93.5 Ma
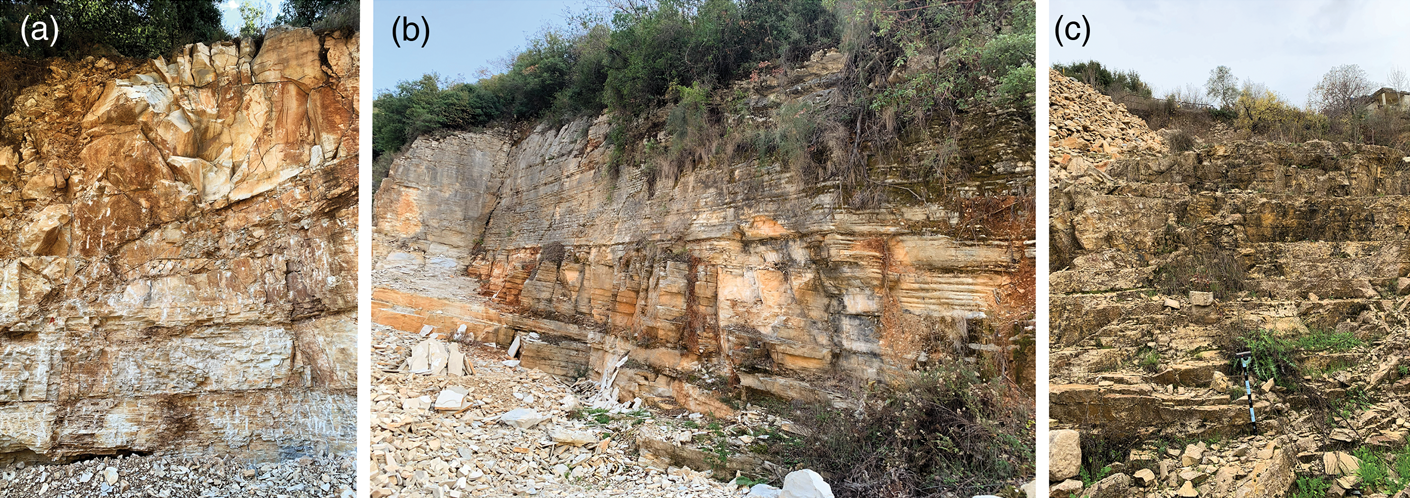
- Outcrops of the Sannine Formation: (a) Haqel; (b) Nammoura; (c) Hjoula
- Type: Geological formation
- Underlies: Maameltain Formation
- Overlies: Hammana Formation
- Thickness: Coastal: >2,000 m (6,600 ft); Mountains: 500–700 m (1,600–2,300 ft)

Lithology
- Primary: Chalk, limestone
- Other: Marl

Location
- Coordinates: 34.1°N 35.7°E
- Approximate paleocoordinates: 12.9°N 30.4°E
- Region: Jabal Lubnan
- Country: Lebanon

Type section
- Named for: Mount Sannine
- Sannine Formation (Lebanon)

The Sannine Formation, also called the Sannine Limestone, is a Cretaceous geologic formation in Lebanon. It is a Konservat-Lagerstätte that contains a high diversity of well-preserved fish, reptiles, and invertebrates from the Tethys Ocean within its three main localities: Haqel (alternatively Hakel or Haqil), Hjoula (alternatively Hadjoula, Hajoula, or Hgula), and Nammoura (alternatively Namoura).

It is one of three major Cretaceous lagerstätte in Lebanon, alongside the older (Barremian-aged) Lebanese amber and the younger (Santonian-aged) Sahel Aalma site. The Sannine Formation localities, combined with Sahel Alma, are together referred to as the "Fish Beds" of Lebanon.

== Description ==
It is primarily Cenomanian in age, with Haqel and Hjoula being late Cenomanian, while the slightly older Nammoura site is middle Cenomanian. Although Lebanon is now a part of Asia, the depositional environment for both formations would have been located off the coast of northern Africa during the Cretaceous, which would technically make their biota African rather than Asian.

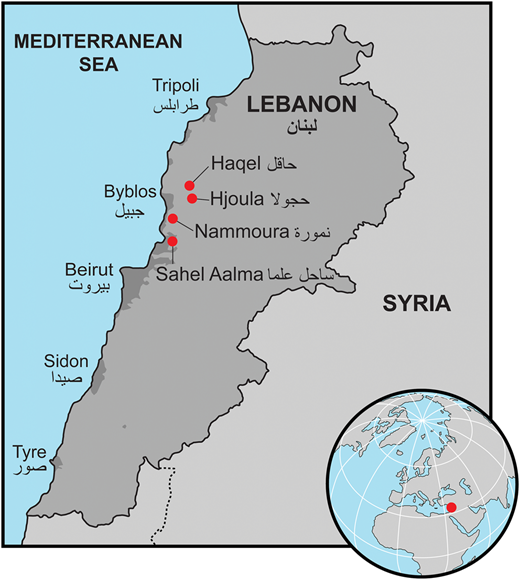
Map of Lebanon showing the locations of the 4 famous Upper Cretaceous Lagerstätten

The Cretaceous formations of Lebanon laterally vary from east to west; the western lowland "coastal" sequence (containing Sahel Aalma) is over 2000 metres thick and primarily consists of deep water limestone and chalk, while the eastern "mountain" sequence (containing the Sannine Formation) is 500–700 metres thick and consists of shallow water limestone. Two different shallow-water environments are preserved by the formation: Nammoura preserves a nearshore inner continental shelf environment with significant terrestrial input, while Haqel & Hjoula preserve an outer continental shelf environment. The neritic nature of these habitats contrasts with the other major marine lagerstätte of the region, Sahel Aalma, which is thought to have been deposited in a deepwater continental slope environment.

Pterosaur fossils have been recovered from the formation, including those of Mimodactylus and Microtuban. The pythonomorphs Pontosaurus, Eupodophis and probably Aphanizocnemus are known from the formation. Insects are also known from compression fossils, including those of a dragonfly, enigmatic pond-skater like insect Chresmoda. and a mesoblattinid cockroach. Compression fossils of angiosperm Sapindopsis are also known. Numerous species of fossil fish are known, including the ionoscopid Spathiurus dorsalis and pycnodontid Flagellipinna rhomboides. An incredible diversity of fossil pycnodonts of various, highly unusual body plans is known, in addition to the earliest representatives of modern fish groups such as acanthomorphs, African butterflyfish and eels.

== History ==
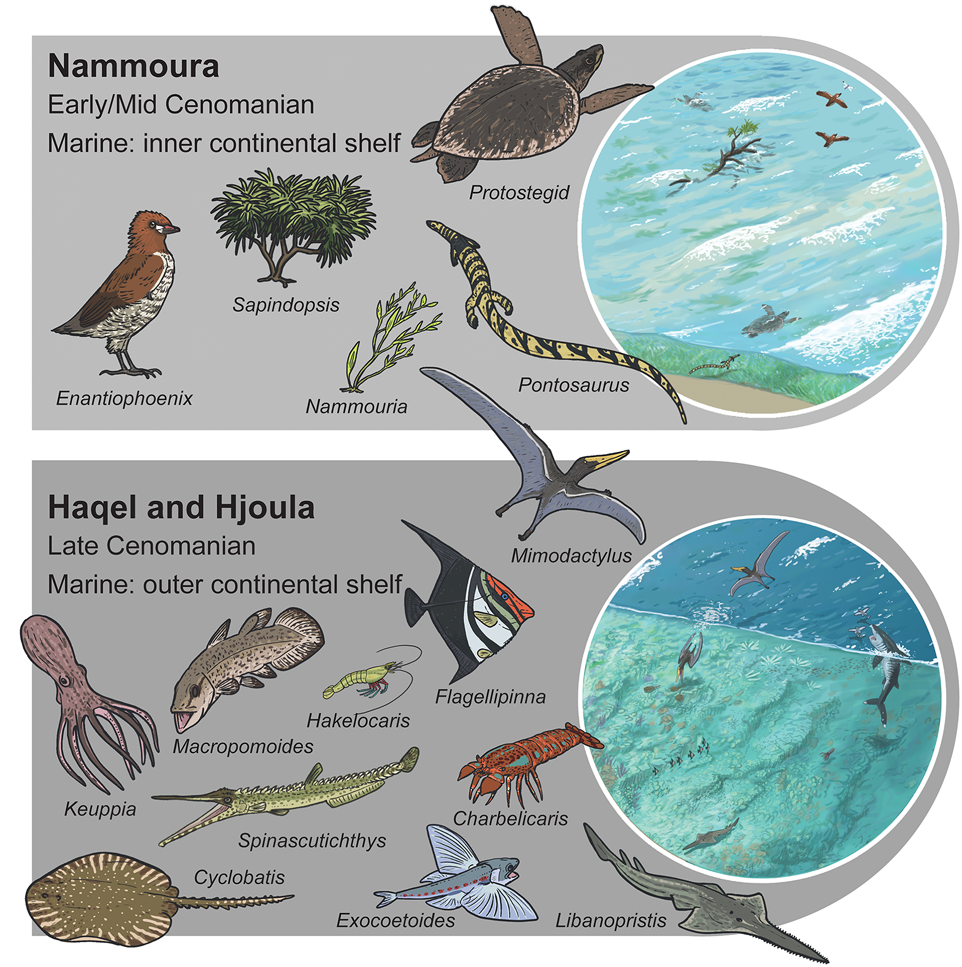
Diagram of the depositional environments of the Upper Cretaceous Sannine Formation Lagerstätten with a selection of iconic flora and fauna

The Sannine Formation and its fossil fishes have been known of since Roman Phoenicia. The earliest mention of them is in the Chronicon by Eusebius around 314 CE (references to earlier mentions by Herodotus are thought to be apocryphal), who mentions fossil fishes commonly being found during quarrying operations in the mountains, and cites them as evidence of the Biblical Flood. The site that these fish were recovered from is thought to correspond to the modern Haqel site. Around 1250, fossil fishes were presented to Louis IX during the Seventh Crusade and documented by Jean de Joinville, although it remains uncertain whether these originated from Haqel or the younger Sahel Alma site.

The first European to visit a Lebanese fossil fish locality in person was Cornelis de Bruijn in 1698, who illustrated a fossil fish that corresponds with the species Prionolepis cataphractus from Haqel. The first scientific presentation on the fossil fishes of Haqel was in 1703 at the French Academy of Sciences, and the first scientific studies were conducted by Henri Marie Ducrotay de Blainville in 1818. Lady Hester Stanhope collected and circulated fossil fishes from Haqel and Sahel Alma during the early 19th century, contributing to the study of these specimens by scientists such as Louis Agassiz. The Hadjoula site was only discovered in the late 19th century, and the Nammoura site in the early 20th century.

== Paleobiota ==
=== Vertebrates ===
==== Jawless fish ====
Agnathans reported from the Sannine Formation
Genus	Species	Presence	Notes	Images
Tethymyxine	T. tapirostrum	Hjoula	One of the earliest known definitive fossil hagfish.	

==== Cartilaginous fish ====
Chondrichthyans reported from the Sannine Formation
Genus	Species	Presence	Notes	Images
Cantioscyllium	C. decipiens	Haqel & Hjoula	A nurse shark.	
Cantioscyllium	C. sp.	Hjoula	A nurse shark.	
Crassescyliorhinus	C. cf. germanicus	Hjoula	A catshark.	
Cretalamna	C. sp.	Hjoula	An otodontid shark, formerly identified as C. appendiculata.	
Cretodus	C. "longiplicatus"	Hjoula	A pseudoscapanorhynchid shark.	
Cretodus	C. semiplicatus	Haqel & Hjoula	A pseudoscapanorhynchid shark.	
Cretoxyrhina	C. mantelli	Hjoula	A Cretoxyrhinid.	
Cyclobatis	C. major	Haqel & Hjoula	A cyclobatid ray.	
Cyclobatis	C. oligodactylus	Haqel, Hjoula & Nammoura	A cyclobatid ray.	
Cyclobatis	C. tuberculatus	Haqel	A cyclobatid ray.	
Deania	D. sp.	Haqel	A gulper shark.	
Ginglymostomatidae indet.		Hjoula	A nurse shark.	
Haimirichia	H. amonensis	Haqel & Nammoura	A haimirichiid mackerel shark.	
Hemiscylliidae indet.		Haqel & Hjoula	A bamboo shark.	
Heterodontus	H. sp.	Hjoula	A bullhead shark.	
Libanopristis	L. hiram	Haqel & Hjoula	A sawskate.	
Mesiteia	M. emiliae	Haqel	A mesiteiid carpet shark.	
Micropristis	M. solomonis	Hjoula	A sawskate.	
Odontaspididae indet.		Hjoula	A sand shark.	
Odontaspis	O. aculeatus	Hjoula	A sand shark.	
Odontaspis	O. sp.	Hjoula	A sand shark.	
Paranomotodon	P. sp.	Hjoula	A thresher shark.	
Pararhincodon	P. lehmani	Haqel	A collared carpet shark.	
Pararhincodon	P. sp.	Haqel & Hjoula	A collared carpet shark.	
Protoscyliorhinus	P. sp.	Haqel	A catshark.	
Pseudocorax	P. kindlimmani	Haqel	A false crow shark.	
Rajorhina	R. expansa	Hjoula	A skate.	
'Rhinobatos' (gen. nov. 1)	R. grandis	Haqel	A potential relative of wedgefishes. Likely its own genus.	
'Rhinobatos' (gen. nov. 1)	R. maronita	Haqel	A potential relative of wedgefishes. Likely its own genus.	
'Rhinobatos' (gen. nov. 3)	R. hakelensis	Haqel	A guitarfish-like ray. Likely its own genus, and its status as a guitarfish is disputed.	
'Rhinobatos' (gen. nov. 3)	R. whitfieldi	Hjoula	A guitarfish-like ray. Likely its own genus, and its status as a guitarfish is disputed.	
Rhombopterygia	R. rajoides	Hjoula	A guitarfish.	
Scyliorhinidae indet.		Haqel	A catshark.	
Scyliorhinus	S. arambourgi	Hjoula	A catshark.	
Scyliorhinus	S. bloti	Haqel	A catshark.	
Scyliorhinus	S. sp.	Haqel	A catshark.	
Squalicorax	S. falcatus	Nammoura	A crow shark.	
Squalicorax	S. sp.	Haqel, Hjoula & Nammoura	A crow shark.	
Squatina	S. sp.	Haqel	An angelshark.	
Triakidae indet.		Haqel	A houndshark.	

==== Ray-finned fish ====
Actinopterygians reported from the Sannine Formation
Genus	Species	Presence	Notes	Images
Abisaadia	A. hakelensis	Haqel	An eel.	
Abisaadichthys	A. libanicus	Hjoula	A protobramid tselfatiiform.	
Acrognathus	A. dodgei	Haqel & Hjoula	A greeneye.	
Acrorhinichthys	A. poyatoi	Haqel & Nammoura	A pycnodont of uncertain affinities.	
Aipichthys	A. minor	Haqel & Hjoula	A lamprimorph.	
Aipichthys	A. oblongus	Haqel	A lamprimorph.	
Aipichthys	A. velifer	Haqel	A lamprimorph.	
Anguillavus	A. mazeni	Haqel & Hjoula	An eel.	
Anguillavus	A. quadripinnis	Hjoula	An eel.	
Apateopholidae indet.	nov. gen. nov. sp.	Haqel	An apateopholid aulopiform.	
Apateopholis	A. laniatus	Haqel, Hjoula & Nammoura	An apateopholid aulopiform.	
Apateopholis	A. nov. sp.	Nammoura	An apateopholid aulopiform.	
Aphanepygus	A. dorsalis	Haqel	An aphanepygid.	
Akromystax	A. tilmachiton	Haqel & Nammoura	A pycnodont of uncertain affinities.	
Armigatus	A. alticorpus	Nammoura and Haqel	A clupeomorph	
Armigatus	A. brevissimus	Haqel and Hjoula	An armigatid clupeomorph	
Armigatus	A. namourensis	Nammoura	A clupeomorph	
Belonostomus	B. "sp. 1"	Nammoura	An aspidorhynchid. 2 unnamed species awaiting better material	
Belonostomus	B. "sp. 2"	Nammoura	An aspidorhynchid. 2 unnamed species awaiting better material	
Benthesikyme	B. serpentina	Haqel & Hjoula	A dercetid aulopiform.	
Berycopsis	B. pulcher	Hjoula	A beardfish.	
Capassopiscis	C. pankowskii	Haqel	A pantodontid.	
Charitopsis	C. spinosus	Haqel & Hjoula	A gonorynchid.	
Chirocentrites	C. sp.	Nammoura	A cladocyclid ichthyodectiform.	
Coccodus	C. armatus	Haqel	A coccodontid pycnodont.	
Coccodus	C. insignis	Hjoula	A coccodontid pycnodont.	
Corusichthys	C. megacephalus	Haqel	A coccodontid pycnodont.	
Cretapantodon	C. polli	Haqel	A pantodontid.	
Cryptoberyx	C. minimus	Hjoula	An indeterminate acanthopterygian.	
Ctenodentelops	C. striatus	Nammoura	An elopid.	
Ctenothrissa	C. protodorsalis	Haqel	A ctenothrissiform acanthomorph.	
Ctenothrissa	C. signifer	Hjoula	A ctenothrissiform acanthomorph.	
Ctenothrissa	C. vexillifer	Haqel	A ctenothrissiform acanthomorph.	
?Cylindracanthus	?C. libanicus	Haqel & Hjoula	An indeterminate ray-finned fish known only from rostral spines.	
Davichthys	D. gardnieri	Haqel	An elopid.	
Dercetidae indet.	nov. gen. nov. sp.	Hjoula	A dercetid aulopiform.	
Diplomystus	D. birdi	Haqel & Hjoula	An armigatid clupeomorph.	
Ducrotayichthys	D. cornutus	Haqel	A gladiopycnodontid pycnodont.	
Enchelion	E. montium	Haqel & Hjoula	An eel.	
Enchodus	E. marchesetti	Haqel & Hjoula	An enchodontid aulopiform.	
Enchodus	E. mecoanalis	Nammoura	An enchodontid aulopiform.	
Enchodus	E. "sp. 1."	Haqel	An enchodontid aulopiform.	
Enchodus	E. "sp. 2."	Nammoura	An enchodontid aulopiform.	
Eubiodectes	E. libanicus	Haqel, Hjoula & Nammoura	A cladocyclid ichthyodectiform.	
Eurypholidae indet.	nov. gen. nov. sp.	Nammoura	An enchodontid aulopiform.	
Eurypholis	E. boissieri	Haqel, Hjoula & Nammoura	An enchodontid aulopiform.	
Eusebichthys	E. byblosi	Haqel	A protobramid tselfatiiform.	
Eusebichthys	E. "sp. 1"	Haqel	A protobramid tselfatiiform.	
Eusebichthys	E. "sp. 2"	Hjoula	A protobramid tselfatiiform.	
Exocoetoides	E. minor	Haqel & Hjoula	A cheirothricid.	
Flagellipinna	F. rhomboides	Haqel	A pycnodontid pycnodont.	
Freigichthys	F. elleipsis	Hjoula	A lamprimorph.	
Gebrayelichthys	G. uyenoi	Haqel	A gebrayelichthyid pycnodont.	
Gebrayelichthys	G. vexillarius	Haqel	A gebrayelichthyid pycnodont.	
Gaudryella	G. gaudryi	Haqel, Hjoula & Nammoura	An indeterminate euteleost.	
Gharbouria	G. libanica	Nammoura	An indeterminate euteleost.	
Gigapteryx	G. tethyestris	Nammoura	A lamprimorph.	
Gladiopycnodus	G. byrnei	Hjoula	A gladiopycnodontid pycnodont.	
Gladiopycnodus	G. karami	Haqel	A gladiopycnodontid pycnodont.	
Ginsburgia	G. operta	Haqel & Hjoula	An indeterminate euteleost.	
Hajulia	H. multidens	Haqel & Hjoula	A bonefish.	
Hakelia	H. laticauda	Haqel & Hjoula	An indeterminate neoteleost.	
Hakeliosomus	H. hakelensis	Haqel & Hjoula	A gonorynchid.	
Haqelpycnodus	H. picteti	Haqel	A pycnodontid pycnodont.	
Hastichthys	H. gracilis	Haqel & Nammoura	A dercetid aulopiform.	
Hayenchelys	H. germanus	Hjoula	An eel.	
Hayolperichthys	H. pectospinus	Haqel	A gladiopycnodontid pycnodont.	
Hemisaurida	H. hakelensis	Haqel	A halecid aulopiform.	
Hensodon	H. spinosus	Haqel	A coccodontid pycnodont	
Heterothrissa	H. signeuxae	Haqel	A ctenothrissiform acanthomorph.	
Hgulichthys	H. spinus	Hjoula	A trachichthyiform.	
Humilichthys	H. orientalis	Hjoula	A ctenothrissiform acanthomorph.	
Ichthyoceros	I. spinosus	Haqel	A coccodontid pyncodont.	
Ichthyotringa	I. delicata	Haqel & Hjoula	An ichthyotringid aulopiform.	
Joinvillichthys	J. kriweti	Haqel & Hjoula	A gladiopycnodontid pycnodont.	
Joinvillichthys	J. lindstroemi	Haqel	A gladiopycnodontid pycnodont.	
Lebonichthys	L. lewisi	Hjoula	A bonefish.	
Lebonichthys	L. namourensis	Nammoura	A bonefish.	
Lebrunichthys	L. nammourensis	Nammoura	A pachyrhizodontid.	
Libanoberyx	L. spinosus		A trachichthyiform.	
Lissoberyx	L. arambourgi	Hjoula	A trachichthyiform.	
Lissoberyx	L. dayi	Hjoula	A trachichthyiform.	
Lissoberyx	L. denticulatus	Hjoula	A trachichthyiform.	
Luenchelys	L. minimus	Nammoura	An eel.	
Maraldichthys	M. verticalis	Haqel	A gebrayelichthyid pycnodont.	
Microcapros	M. libanicus	Hjoula	A quaesitoberycid beryciform.	
Monocerichthys	M. scheuchzeri	Haqel & Hjoula	A gladiopycnodontid pycnodont.	
Nematonotus	N. bottae	Haqel & Nammoura	A flagfin.	
Nematonotus	N. longispinus	Hjoula	A flagfin.	
'Nursallia'	'N.' goedeli	Haqel, Hjoula & Nammoura	A pycnodontid pycnodont.	
'Nursallia'	'N.' tethysensis	Nammoura and Hjoula	A pycnodontid pycnodont.	
Omosoma	O. sp./gen. nov. sp. nov.	Nammoura	Possibly an indeterminate beardfish, potentially a new genus.	
Ornategulum	O. sardinioides	Haqel & Nammoura	A clupeomorph.	
Palaeopantodon	P. vandersypeni	Haqel	A pantodontid.	
Pankowskichthys	P. libanicus	Haqel & Nammoura	A gladiopycnodontid pycnodont.	
Pankowskipiscis	P. haqelensis	Haqel	A pantodontid.	
Paracentrus	P. lebanonensis	Nammoura	A holocentriform	
Paracentrus	P. sp. nov.	Nammoura	A holocentriform	
Paraclupeidae indet.	nov. gen. 1	Nammoura	A paraclupeid clupeomorph; two different genera.	
Paraclupeidae indet.	nov. gen. 2.	Hjoula	A paraclupeid clupeomorph; two different genera.	
Paracoccodus	P. woodwardi	Haqel	A coccodontid pyncodont.	
Pateroperca	P. libanica	Hjoula	A ctenothrissiform acanthomorph.	
Pateroperca	P. robusta	Hjoula	A ctenothrissiform acanthomorph.	
Pattersonichthys	P. delicatus	Hjoula	A ctenothrissiform acanthomorph.	
Pattersonoberyx	P. pharsus	Haqel	A potential holocentriform.	
Petalopteryx	P. syriacus	Haqel	An aphanepygid.	
Petersichthys	P. libanicus	Haqel	A pantodontid.	
Pharmacichthys	P. numismalis	Haqel	A pharmacichthyid lamprimorph.	
Pharmacichthys	P. venenifer	Haqel	A pharmacichthyid lamprimorph.	
Phoenicolepis	P. arcuatus	Hjoula	A ctenothrissiform acanthomorph.	
Phylactocephalus	P. microlepis	Haqel & Hjoula	A halecid aulopiform.	
Plectocretacicus	P. clarae	Haqel	A potential tetraodontiform.	
Plesioberyx	P. discoides	Haqel	An indeterminate acanthopterygian.	
Plesioberyx	P. maximus	Haqel	An indeterminate acanthopterygian.	
Prognathoglossum	P. kalassyi	Haqel	A pantodontid.	
Prionolepis	P. cataphractus	Haqel & Hjoula	A prionolepid aulopiform.	
Protobrama	P. avus	Haqel & Hjoula	A protobramid tselfatiiform.	
Protobrama	P. woodwardi	Haqel	A protobramid tselfatiiform.	
Protobramidae indet.	nov. gen. nov. sp.	Nammoura	A protobramid tselfatiiform.	
Pseudoberyx	P. bottae	Haqel & Hjoula	An indeterminate teleost.	
Pseudoberyx	P. grandis	Haqel	An indeterminate teleost.	
Pseudoberyx	P. syriacus	Haqel & Hjoula	An indeterminate teleost.	
Pycnosteroides	P. levispinus	Hjoula	A pycnosteroidid lamprimorph.	
Quaesitoberyx	Q. minutus	Hjoula	A quaesitoberycid beryciform.	
Rhamphoichthys	R. taxidiotis	Haqel	A billfish-like plethodid tselfatiiform.	
Rhinopycnodus	R. gabriellae	Haqel	A pycnodontid pycnodont.	
Rhynchodercetis	R. hakelensis	Haqel & Hjoula	A dercetid aulopiform.	
Rostropycnodus	R. gayeti	Haqel	A gladiopycnodontid pycnodont.	
Sardinioides	S. attenuatus	Haqel & Hjoula	A sardinioidid myctophiform.	
Sardinioides	S. minimus	Haqel & Hjoula	A sardinioidid myctophiform.	
Sardinioides	S. pontivagus	Haqel & Hjoula	A sardinioidid myctophiform.	
Saurorhamphus	S. giorgiae	Nammoura	An enchodontid aulopiform.	
Scombroclupea	S. diminuta	Nammoura	A clupeomorph.	
Scombroclupea	S. macrophthalma	Haqel & Hjoula	A clupeomorph.	
Scutatoclupea	S. bacchiai	Nammoura	A paraclupeid clupeomorph.	
Sedenhorstia	S. dayi	Hjoula	A tarpon.	
Sedenhorstia	S. libanica	Haqel	A tarpon.	
Sedenhorstia	S. orientalis	Hjoula	A tarpon.	
Serrilepis	S. minor	Nammoura	A halecid aulopiform.	
Serrilepis	S. prymnostrigos	Nammoura	A halecid aulopiform.	
Sigmapycnodus	S. giganteus	Haqel	A pycnodontid pycnodont.	
Sorbinichthys	S. elusivo	Nammoura	A sorbinichthyid clupeomorph.	
Spathiurus	S. dorsalis	Haqel	An ionoscopiform.	
Spinascutichthys	S. pankowskiae	Nammoura	An enchodontoid aulopiform.	
Stanhopeichthys	S. libanicus	Hjoula	A pachyrhizodontid.	
Stenoprotome	S. hamata	Haqel	A gladiopycnodontid pycnodont.	
Stichocentrus	S. elegans	Hjoula	A holocentriform.	
Stichocentrus	S. liratus	Hjoula	A holocentriform.	
Stichocentrus	S. spinulosus	Hjoula	A holocentriform.	
Stichocentrus	S. sp.	Hjoula	A holocentriform.	
Stichopteryx	S. lewisi	Haqel & Hjoula	A trachichthyiform.	
Telepholis	T. tenuis	Haqel & Hjoula	A cheirothricid.	
Trewavasia	T. carinata	Haqel	A coccodontid pycnodont.	
Tricerichthys	T. wenzi	Haqel	A gladiopycnodontid pycnodont.	
Triplomystus	T. noorae	Nammoura	A paraclupeid clupeomorph.	
Triplomystus	T. oligoscutatus	Nammoura	A paraclupeid clupeomorph.	
Volcichthys	V. sp.	Haqel	An indeterminate aulopiform or sardinioid myctophiform.	
Ypsiloichthys	Y. sibelleae	Haqel	A teleost of uncertain affinities.	

==== Lobe-finned fish ====
Sarcopterygians reported from the Sannine Formation
Genus	Species	Presence	Notes	Images
Macropomoides	M. orientalis	Haqel & Hjoula	A latimeriid coelacanth.	

==== Amniotes ====
Amniotes reported from the Sannine Formation
Genus	Species	Presence	Notes	Images
Aphanizocnemus	A. libanensis	Although the type locality is unknown, it is said to "almost certainly" originate from the Sannine Formation.	A marine lizard.	
Enantiophoenix	E. electrophyla	Nammoura	An enantiornithine bird.	
Eupodophis	E. descouensi	Nammoura	An early marine simoliophiid snake with hind limbs.	
Microtuban	M. altivolans	Hjoula	An azdarchoid pterosaur.	
Mimodactylus	M. libanensis	Hjoula	An istiodactyliform pterosaur.	
Pontosaurus	P. kornhuberi	Nammoura	A marine dolichosaurid lizard.	
Rhinochelys	R. nammourensis	Nammoura	A marine protostegid turtle. Adult and multiple hatchling remains known, suggesting a nesting site was nearby.	
Theropoda indet.		Nammoura	The partial arm of a theropod dinosaur, the only non-avialan dinosaur material known from the formation. Now lost.	

=== Invertebrates ===
==== Arthropods ====
Arthropods reported from the Sannine Formation
Genus	Species	Presence	Notes	Images
Acanthochirana	A. smithwoodwardi	Haqel & Hjoula	An aegerid prawn.	
Acanthophoenicides	A. peterpani		A slipper lobster.	
Aeger	A. libanensis	Haqel & Hjoula	An aegerid prawn.	
Armacrangon	A. edwardsi		A glyphocrangonid shrimp.	
?Bentheogennema	B. phoenicia		A benthesicymid crustacean.	
Callianassa	C. sp.	Hjoula	A callianassid crustacean.	
Calliaxina	C. hadjoulaensis	Hjoula	A callianassid crustacean.	
Carinacaris	C. antennae		A penaeid prawn.	
Carinacaris	C. teruzzi	Haqel & Hjoula	A penaeid prawn.	
Carpopenaeus	C. callirostris	Haqel & Hjoula	A carpopenaeid prawn.	
Carpopenaeus	C. septemspinatus	Haqel & Hjoula	A carpopenaeid prawn.	
Charbelicaris	C. maronites	Hjoula	A slipper lobster.	
Chresmoda	C. libanica	Nammoura	A water strider-like chresmodid insect.	
Corazzatocarcinus	C. hadjoulae	Hjoula	A necrocarcinid crab.	
Cretaxiopsis	C. libanotica		An axiid crustacean.	
Cretacalliax	C. levantina	Hjoula	A callianopsid ghost shrimp.	
Epipenaeus	E. abisaadorum		An carpopenaeid shrimp.	
Eryma	E. oscari	Hjoula	An erymid "lobster".	
Gladicrangon	G. coriacea		A glyphocrangonid shrimp.	
Globulacaris	G. garassinoi	Haqel	A protozoeid thylacocephalan.	
Glyphea	G. damesi	Hjoula	A glypheoid crustacean.	
Hakelocaris	H. vavassorii	Haqel & Hjoula	A penaeid prawn.	
Homolopsis	H. aff. edwardsii	Hjoula	A carrier crab.	
Jasus	J. sp.	Hjoula	A spiny lobster.	
Joinvilleicaris	J. longirostris		A penaeid prawn.	
Libanoaxius	L. beatae		An axiid crustacean.	
Libanocaris	L. curvirostra		A penaeid prawn.	
Libanocaris	L. rogeri	Haqel & Hjoula	A penaeid prawn.	
Lebanoaktassia	L. curiosa	Hjoula	An aktassiid dragonfly.	
Libanoaeshna	L. mikhaeli	Haqel	A libanoaeshnid dragonfly.	
Libanobelostoma	L. calineae	Haqel	A giant water bug.	
Libanocordulia	L. debiei	Hjoula	A libanocorduliid dragonfly	
Libanogomphus	L. lionelcavini	Hjoula	A libanogomphid dragonfly.	
Libanoliupanshania	L. mimi	Hjoula	A liupanshaniid dragonfly	
Linuparus	L. secretanae		A spiny lobster.	
Macropenaeus	M. incertus	Haqel & Hjoula	A penaeid prawn.	
Magila	M. cretacica		An axiid crustacean.	
Microchela	M. rostrata	Haqel & Hjoula	A penaeid prawn.	
Mieroblattina	M. pacis	Nammoura	A mesoblattinid cockroach.	
Notahomarus	N. hakelensis	Haqel & Hjoula	A true lobster.	
Odontochelion	O. bicarinatum		A crangonid shrimp.	
Odontochelion	O. cretaceum	Haqel & Hjoula	A crangonid shrimp.	
Palaeobenthonectes	P. arambourgi		A benthesicymid crustacean.	
Palaeopalinurellus	P. jbeilensis	Haqel	A slipper lobster.	
Palaeopandalus	P. komaii		A pandalid shrimp.	
Palibacus	P. praecursor	Haqel & Hjoula	A slipper lobster.	
Palinurus	P. teruzzii		A spiny lobster.	
Paracancrinos	P. libanensis	Hjoula	A slipper lobster.	
Paradollocaris	P. vannieri	Hjoula	A dollocaridid thylacocephalan.	
Paranecrocarcinus	P. cf. milbournei	Hjoula	A necrocarcinid crab. Specimen consumed by a catshark.	
Phalangiopsis	P. antoinei		A chirostylid squat lobster.	
Phalangiopsis	P. rogeri		A chirostylid squat lobster.	
Phoenice	P. pasinii	Haqel	A boxer shrimp.	
Pseudastacus	P. dubertreti	Haqel & Hjoula	A stenochirid "lobster".	
Pustulina	P. cretacea	Haqel & Hjoula	An erymid "lobster".	
Striadiogenes	S. frigerioi	Hjoula	A diogenid hermit crab.	
Tachypleus	T. syriacus	Hjoula	A horseshoe crab.	
Telamonocarcinus	T. gambulatus	Haqel & Hjoula	A dorippid crab.	
Thylacocaris	T. schrami	Hjoula	A dollocaridid thylacocephalan.	

==== Molluscs ====
Molluscs reported from the Sannine Formation
Genus	Species	Presence	Notes	Images
Allocrioceras	A. cf. annulatum		An anisoceratid ammonite.	
Boreopeltis	B. smithi	Haqel or Hjoula	A plesioteuthid coleoid.	
Dorateuthis	D. syriaca	Haqel & Hjoula	A plesioteuthid coleoid.	
Edmunditeuthis	E. bacchiai	Haqel & Hjoula	A trachyteuthid coleoid.	
Glyphidopsis	G. waagei	Haqel	A trachyteuthid coleoid.	
Glyphiteuthis	G. abisaadorum	Haqel & Hjoula	A trachyteuthid coleoid.	
Glyphiteuthis	G. freijii	Haqel, Hjoula & Nammoura	A trachyteuthid coleoid.	
Glyphiteuthis	G. libanotica	Haqel & Hjoula	A trachyteuthid coleoid.	
Keuppia	K. levante	Hjoula	An early octopus. 2 or 3 species known from the same locality	
Keuppia	K. hyperbolaris	Hjoula	An early octopus. 2 or 3 species known from the same locality	
Keuppia	K. sp.	Hjoula	An early octopus. 2 or 3 species known from the same locality	
Mantelliceras	M. mantelli	Haqel	"the occurrence of Mantelliceras mantelli is regarded doubtful, as this species has been used for various taxa within the family Acanthoceratidae de Grossouvre, 1894, and specimens have never been figured"	
Rachiteuthis	R. acutali	Hjoula	A palaeololiginid coleoid.	
Rachiteuthis	R. donovani	Hâqel	A palaeololiginid coleoid.	
Styletoctopus	S. annae	Hâqel	An early octopus.	
Teudopsinia	T. haasi	Haqel	A teudopsid coleoid.	
Syrionautilus	S. libanoticus	Hjoula	A cymatoceratid nautiloid.	

==== Echinoderms ====
Echinoderms reported from the Sannine Formation
Genus	Species	Presence	Notes	Images
Antedon	A. pinnulata	Haqel	A crinoid.	
Aspidochirotida indet.		Hjoula	A sea cucumber.	
Geocoma	G. libanotica	Haqel	A brittle star.	

==== Annelids ====
Annelids reported from the Sannine Formation
Genus	Species	Presence	Notes	Images
Didone	D. pulcherrima		A didonid bristleworm.	
Eunicites	E. diopatroides		A eunicid bristleworm.	
Eunicites	E. falcatus		A eunicid bristleworm.	
Eunicites	E. joinvillei		A eunicid bristleworm.	
Eunicites	E. mariacristinae		A eunicid bristleworm.	
Ferragutia	F. cenomaniana		A bristleworm.	
Lumbriconereites	L. garassinoi		A bristleworm.	
Lumbriconereites	L. hadjulae		A bristleworm.	
Palaeoaphrodite	P. libanica		An aphroditid bristleworm.	
Phoeniciarabella	P. caesaris		A lumbrinerid bristleworm.	
Phoeniciarabella	P. orensanzi		A lumbrinerid bristleworm.	
Phoeniciarabella	P. pinnulata		A lumbrinerid bristleworm.	
Teruzzia	T. gryphoeides		A lumbrinerid bristleworm.	
Teruzzia	T. pezzolii		A lumbrinerid bristleworm.	
Teruzzia	T. pusilla		A lumbrinerid bristleworm.	
Teruzzia	T. sagittifera		A lumbrinerid bristleworm.	
Rollinschaeta	R. myoplena	Haqel & Hjoula	A fireworm.	

=== Plants ===
Plants reported from the Sannine Formation
Genus	Species	Presence	Notes	Images
Aryskumia	cf. A. zelkovifolia	Nammoura	Dicot known from a poorly preserved leaf with ovate blade.	
Nammouria	N. gracilis	Nammoura	An aquatic fern of uncertain affinities.	
Nammourophyllum	N. altingioides	Nammoura	A dicot known from leaves, a possible member of the Altingiaceae.	
Nupharanthus	N. cretacea	Nammoura	A dicot known by a preserved flower, possibly a member of the Nympheales.	
Parvileguminophyllum	P. sp.	Nammoura	Dicot known from a complete leaflet, possibly a member of the Fabaceae.	
'Phragmites'	P. sp.	Nammoura	A monocot of uncertain affinities, vaguely similar to the modern reed.	
Platycaryeae gen. et sp. indet.		Nammoura	Infructescence of bracteate fruits resembling Platycarya americana.	
Pseudolarix	P. sp.	Nammoura	A conifer related to the modern golden larch.	
Pseudotorellia	P. sp.	Nammoura	A gymnosperm of uncertain affinities.	
Pteris	P. sp.	Nammoura	A pteridacean fern.	
Sapindopsis	S. anhouryi	Nammoura	A platanacean, related to the modern plane trees.	
Sapindopsis	S. libanensis	Nammoura	A platanacean, related to the modern plane trees.	

== See also ==
- List of pterosaur-bearing stratigraphic units
- Paleontology in Lebanon
