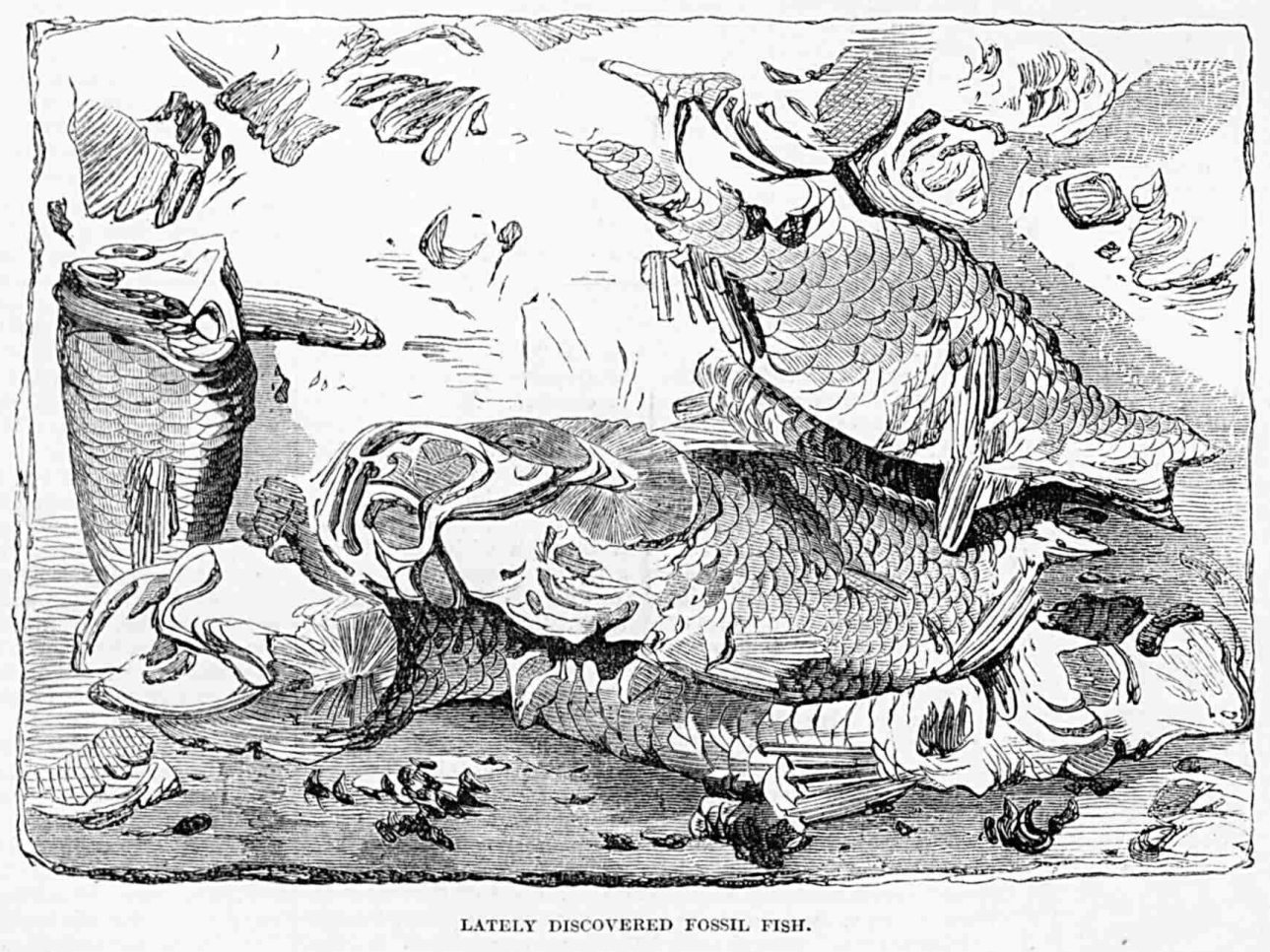
- Illustration of type specimens

Scientific classification
- Kingdom: Animalia
- Phylum: Chordata
- Class: Actinopterygii
- Order: Beryciformes
- Genus: †Caproberyx; Regan, 1911
- Species: †C. superbus

Binomial name
- †Caproberyx superbus (Dixon, 1850)

Synonyms
- Beryx superbus Dixon, 1850; Berycopsis major Woodward, 1902

= Caproberyx =

Caproberyx Temporal range: Turonian

Extinct genus of fishes

Caproberyx is an extinct genus of marine acanthomorph ray-finned fish, possibly a holocentrid, from the Late Cretaceous.

It contains a single species, C. superbus, from the early to late Turonian of the English Chalk. Other former species found in Lebanon (C. pharsus) and Morocco (C. polydesmus) have been assigned to their own genera (Pattersonoberyx and Stichoberyx respectively). Potential remains of an indeterminate species have also been found in the Smoky Hill Chalk of Kansas, USA. The fossil of a similar fish is also known from the Mancos Shale of New Mexico, USA.

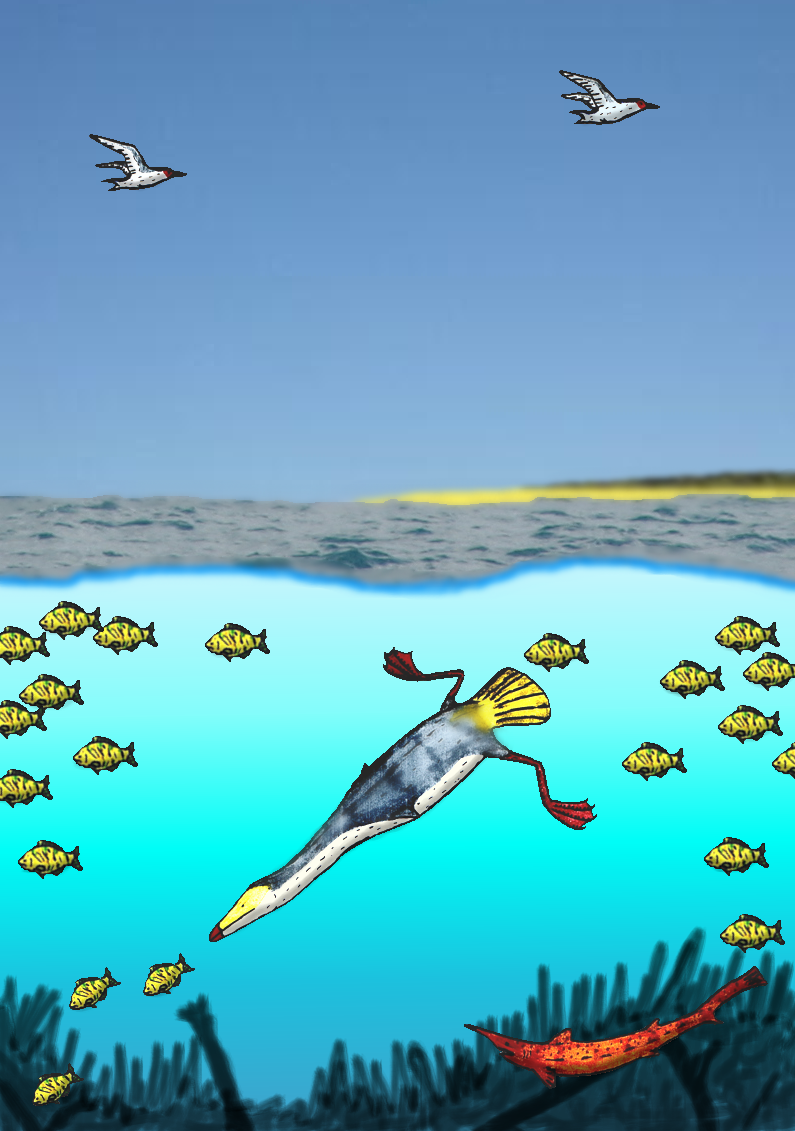
Restored Western Interior Seaway scene with Caproberyx

Previously considered a berycid, it has more recently often been considered an early holocentrid, making it related to squirrelfishes and soldierfishes. However, more recent studies have recovered it as an indeterminate acanthomorph, and possibly most closely related to the Trachichthyiformes.

The species name superbus references the exceptional nature of some specimens, consisting of three-dimensionally preserved mass death assemblages with mouths open in tetany. Such specimens may be the result of rapid burial following these mass mortalities.
