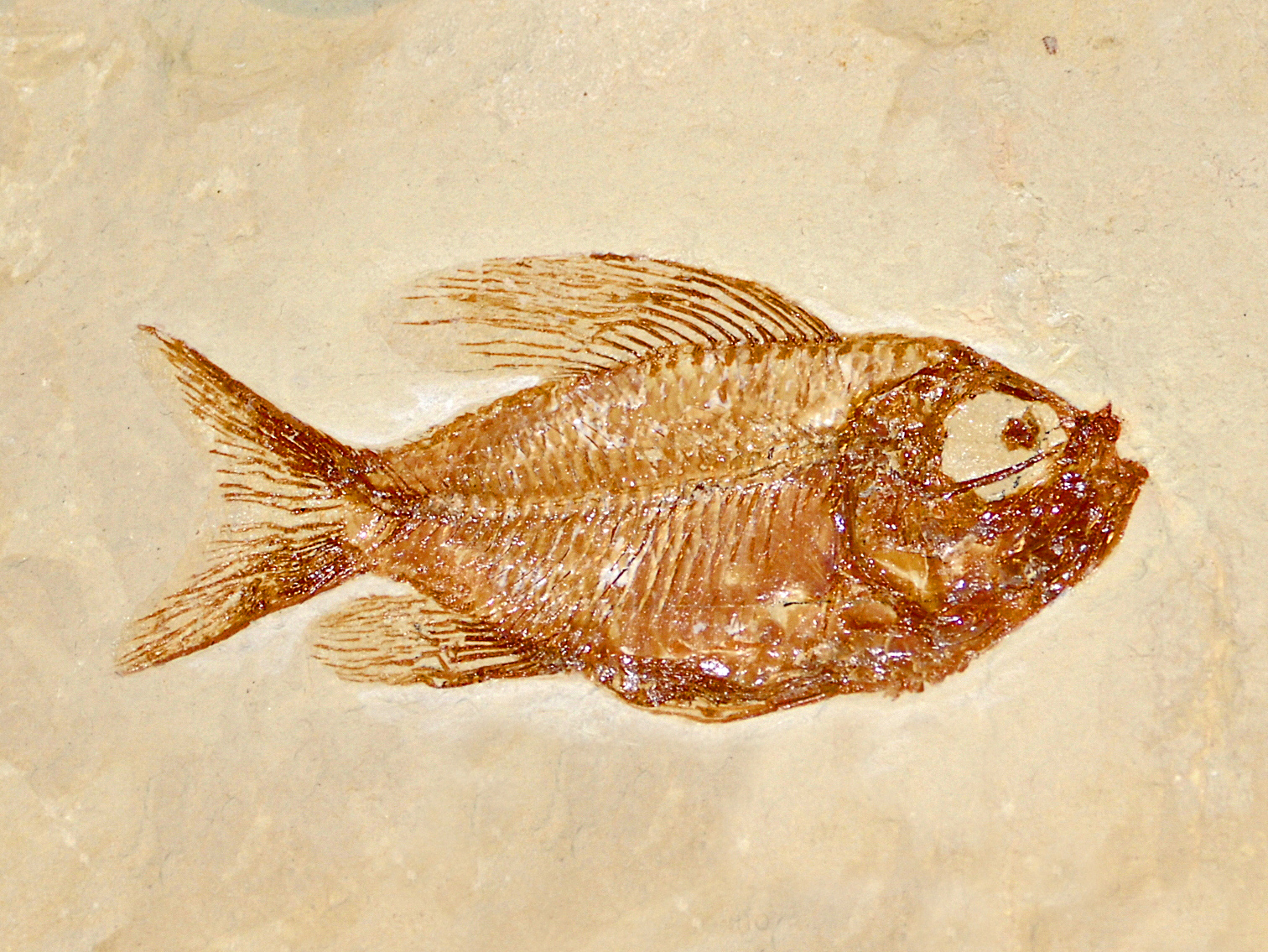
- Fossil of Ctenothrissa vexillifer (Pictet, 1850) from Lebanon

Scientific classification
- Kingdom: Animalia
- Phylum: Chordata
- Class: Actinopterygii
- Order: †Ctenothrissiformes
- Family: †Ctenothrissidae
- Genus: †Ctenothrissa; Woodward, 1899

Type species
- †Beryx vexillifer Pictet, 1850

Species
- See text

= Ctenothrissa =

Ctenothrissa Temporal range: Cenomanian to Turonian

Extinct genus of fishes

Ctenothrissa is a prehistoric genus of marine ray-finned fish in the order Ctenothrissiformes. It contains a number of species known from the Late Cretaceous (middle Cenomanian to early Turonian) of England and Lebanon.

== Taxonomy ==
The following species are known:

- †C. microcephala (Agassiz, 1837) - Cenomanian to Turonian of England (English Chalk) (=Beryx microcephalus Agassiz, 1837)
- †C. protodorsalis Gaudant, 1978 - Cenomanian of Lebanon (Haqel site of Sannine Formation)
- †C. radians (Agassiz, 1837) - Cenomanian to Turonian of England (English Chalk) (=Beryx radians Agassiz, 1837)
- †C. signifer Hay, 1903 - Cenomanian of Lebanon (Hadjoula site of Sannine Formation)
- †C. vexillifer (Pictet, 1850) - Cenomanian of Lebanon (Haqel site of Sannine Formation) (=Beryx vexillifer Pictet, 1850) (type species)

These Teleostei are only known from fossils. While they are sometimes included in the superorder Acanthopterygii or Protacanthopterygii, this is neither well-supported, nor is the monophyly of the "Ctenothrissiformes" robustly established. It has instead been suggested by some authors that the supposed order is a paraphyletic assemblage of ancient moderately advanced Teleostei; for example, the ctenothrissiform Aulolepis is found by some authors to be an aulopiform.

== Gallery ==
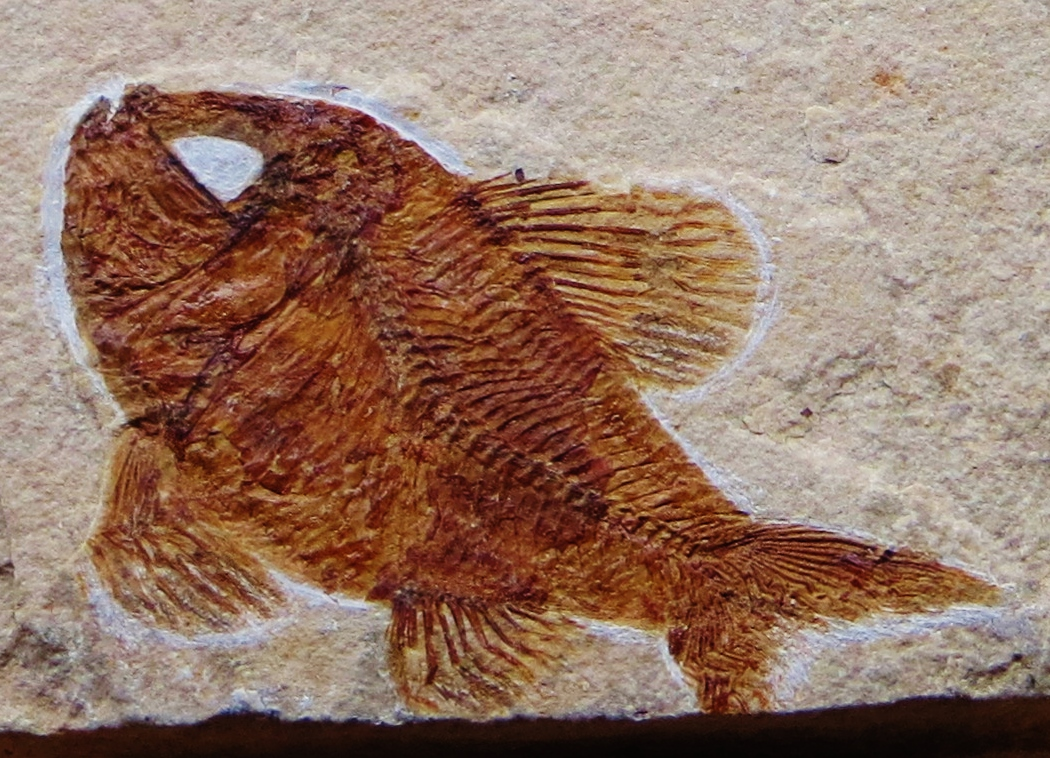
Ctenothrissa species

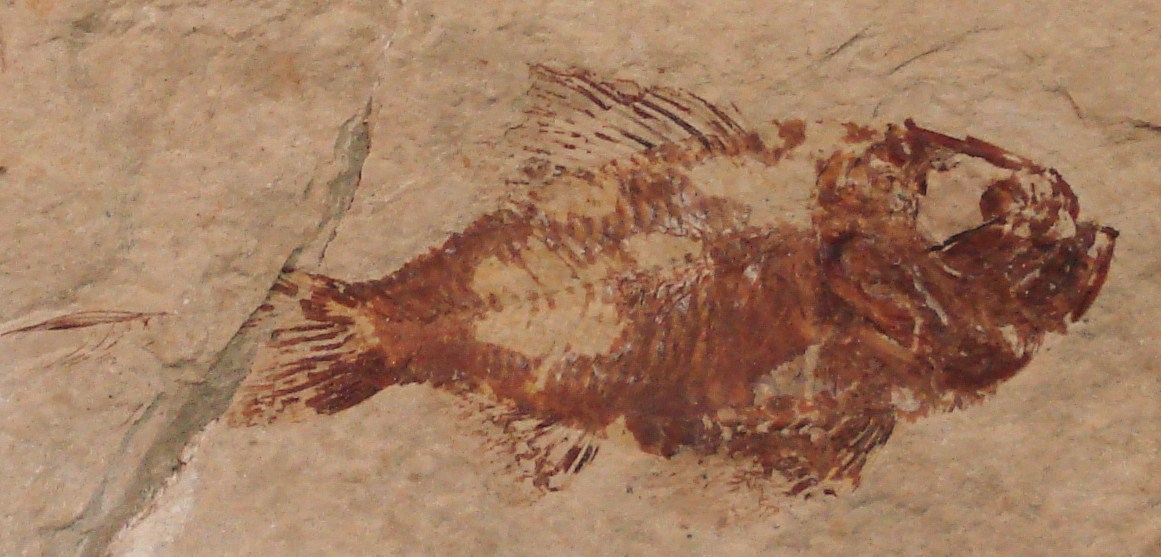
Ctenothrissa vexillifer (Pictet, 1850)

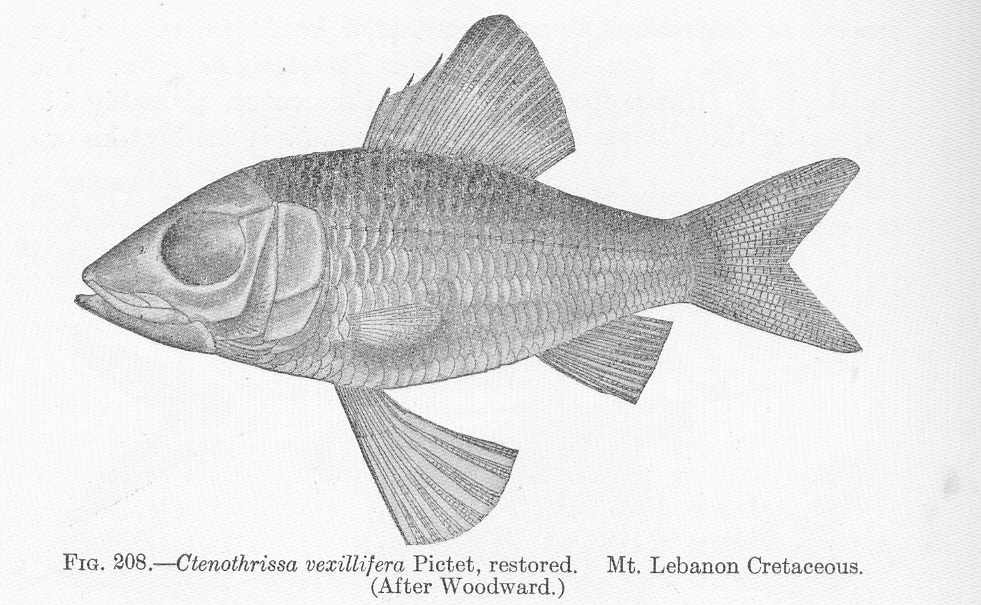
Ctenothrissa vexillifer, restored

== See also ==
- Prehistoric fish
- List of prehistoric bony fish

== Bibliography ==
- Taylor, Christopher (2009): Catalogue of Organisms – Living Larvae and Fossil Fish. Version of 2009-FEB-05. Retrieved 2009-SEP-28.
- Carroll, R. L. 1988. Vertebrate Paleontology and Evolution. New York: W. H. Freeman & Co.
- M. Gayet, A. Belouze & P. Abi Saad, 2003. Liban Mémoire du Temps. Les Poissons fossiles. Éditions Desiris.
- Patterson, C. 1964. "A review of Mesozoic acanthpterygian fishes, with special reference to those of the English chalk." Phil. Trans. Roy Soc. London 247(B):213-482.
- Woodward, A. S., 1899: Additional notes on some Type specimens of Cretaceous Fishes from Mount Lebanon in the Edinburgh Museum of Science and Art. Annals of Natural History, IV 317-321
- Woodward, A. S., 1899: Note on some Cretaceous clupeoid fishes with pectinated scales (Ctenothrissa and Pseudoberyx). Annals and Magazine of Natural History, series 7 3:489-492
- Woodward, A.S., 1891–1901. Catalogue of Fossil Fishes in the British Museum, Parts 1–4. London: British Museum.
