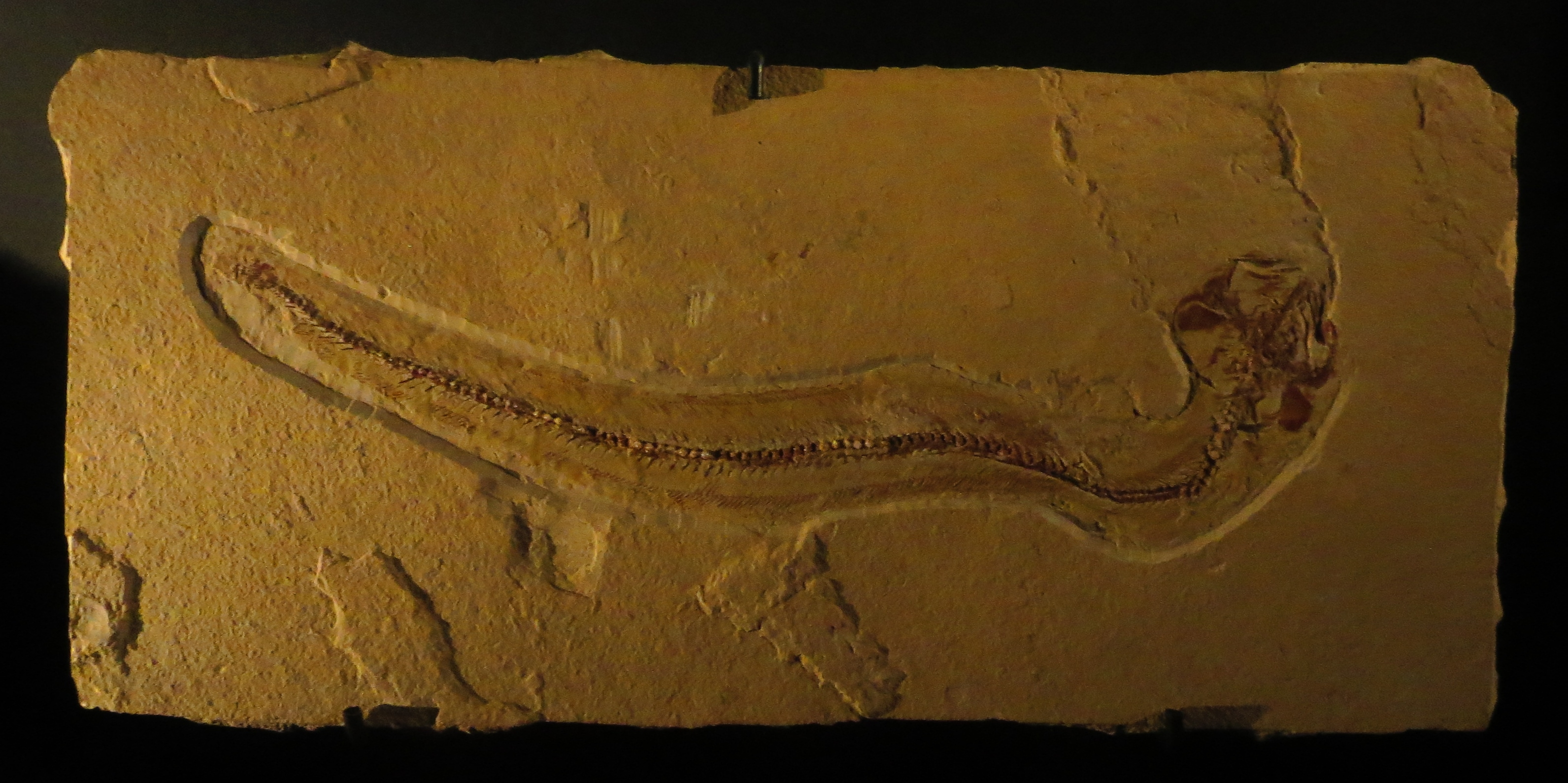
- Fossil specimen

Scientific classification
- Kingdom: Animalia
- Phylum: Chordata
- Class: Actinopterygii
- Order: Anguilliformes (?)
- Family: †Encheliidae; Hay, 1903
- Genus: †Enchelion; Hay, 1903
- Species: †E. montium

Binomial name
- †Enchelion montium Hay, 1903

= Enchelion =

Enchelion Temporal range: Upper Cenomanian

Extinct genus of fishes

Enchelion (Greek for "little eel") is an extinct genus of prehistoric marine ray-finned fish that lived during the Late Cretaceous. It contains a single species, E. montium known from the upper Cenomanian of the Haqel locality of the Sannine Formation in Lebanon. It is the only member of the family Encheliidae.

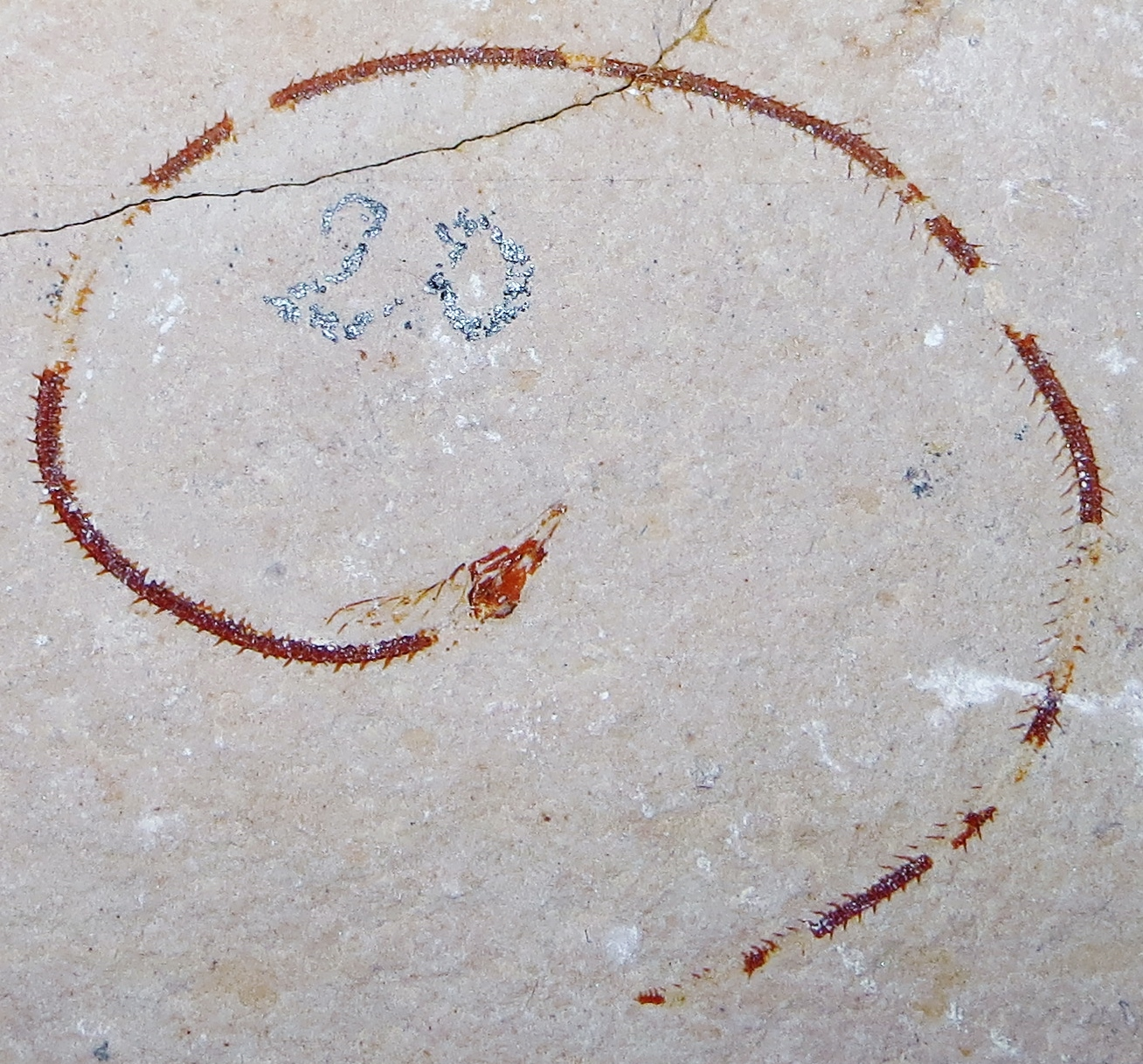
Specimen of Enchelion sp.

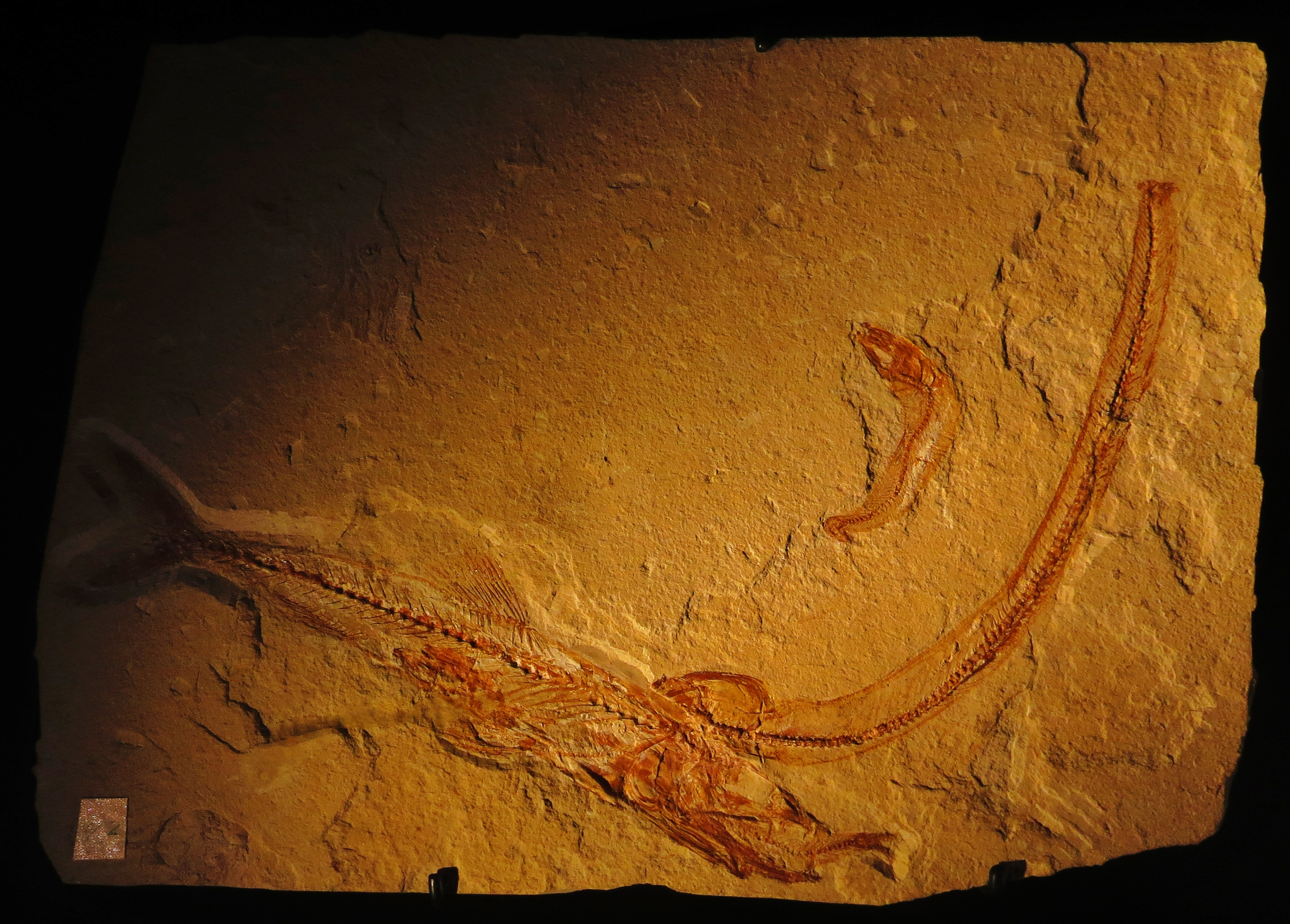
Specimen with Eurypholis

It has a small but extremely elongate appearance reminiscent of an eel, but its taxonomic affinities are uncertain, making it hard to classify. It has a unique diplospondylous (two vertebrae in each segment) vertebral column that is unseen in any modern teleost fish aside from the contemporaneous, enigmatic freshwater Diplospondichthys from the Kem Kem Beds in Morocco. Uniquely, it also has no evidence of fins or fin rays, a trait shared with Diplospondichthys; however, these two genera differ in jaw morphology. Some authors have suggested it may represent the earliest known representative of the Saccopharyngoidei, but this is disputed.

== See also ==
- Prehistoric fish
- List of prehistoric bony fish
