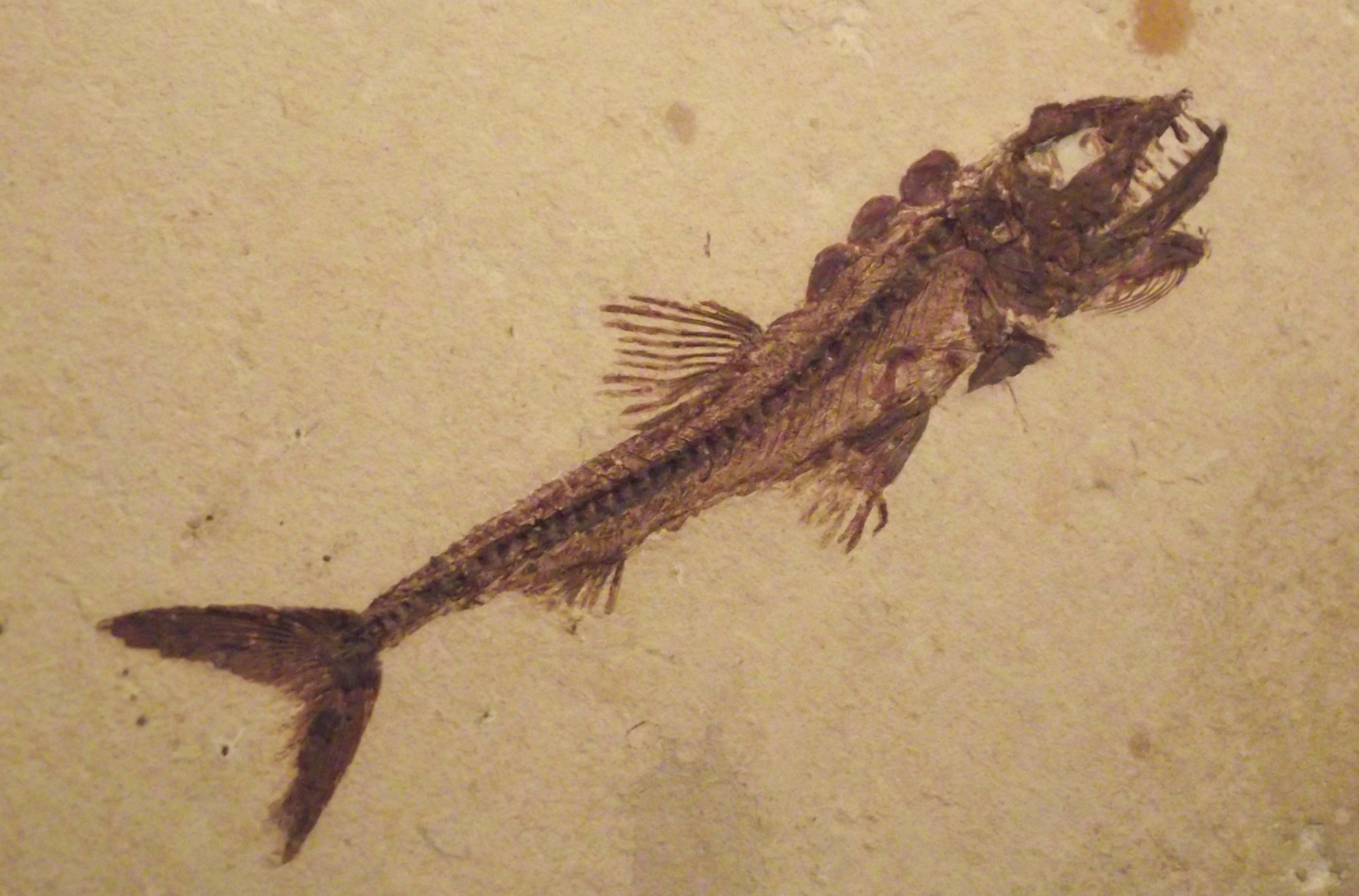
- E. boissieri specimen, San Diego County Fair

Scientific classification
- Kingdom: Animalia
- Phylum: Chordata
- Class: Actinopterygii
- Order: Aulopiformes
- Family: †Enchodontidae
- Subfamily: †Eurypholinae
- Genus: †Eurypholis; Pictet, 1850

Type species
- †Eurypholis boissieri Pictet, 1850

Species
- †E. boissieri Pictet, 1850; †E. japonicus Uyeno & Minakawa, 1983; †E. pulchellus (Woodward, 1901)

= Eurypholis =

Eurypholis Temporal range: Late Cenomanian to Campanian

Extinct genus of ray-finned fishes

Eurypholis (meaning "broad scale") is a genus of prehistoric marine aulopiform fish known from the Late Cretaceous (Cenomanian to Campanian). It contains three species, known from Europe, the Middle East, and east Asia.

The following species are known:

- †E. boissieri Pictet, 1850 (type species) - Cenomanian of Lebanon (Sannine Formation) (=E. sulcidens Pictet, 1850)
- †E. japonicus Uyeno & Minakawa, 1983 - Campanian of Shikoku, Japan (Izumi Group)
- †E. pulchellus (Woodward, 1901) - Cenomanian of England (English Chalk) (=Enchodus pulchellus Woodward, 1901)

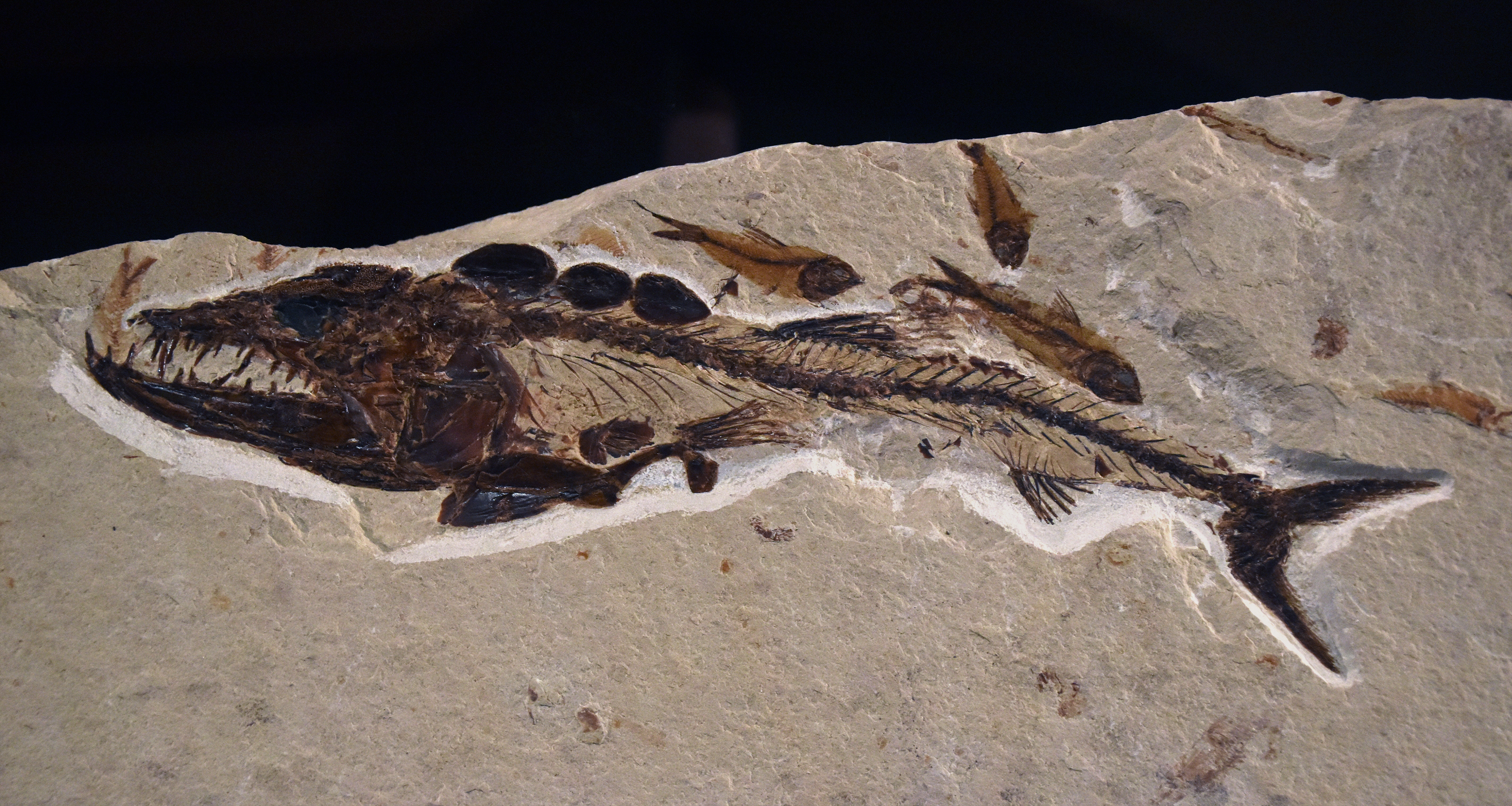
E. boissieri, Natural History Museum, Grenoble

Potential indeterminate remains are known from the Cenomanian of Uzbekistan and the Maastrichtian of Greece, though a review of the Greek records has found no evidence of these remains belonging to Eurypholis.

Of these species, E. boissieri is known from many complete, articulated skeletons, E. pulchellus is known from fragmentary specimens, and E. japonicus is known from a single mandible (closely resembling that of pulchellus) with very large attached teeth.
