= Spathiurus =

Spathiurus Temporal range: Cenomanian

Scientific classification
- Kingdom: Animalia
- Phylum: Chordata
- Class: Actinopterygii
- Clade: Halecomorphi
- Order: †Ionoscopiformes
- Family: †Ionoscopidae
- Genus: †Spathiurus; Davis, 1887
- Species: †S. dorsalis

Binomial name
- †Spathiurus dorsalis Davis, 1887

Synonyms
- Amphilaphurus majorDavis, 1887

Extinct genus of ray-finned fishes

Spathiurus is an extinct genus of ray-finned fish that lived during the Cenomanian in the Sannine Formation of Lebanon.

== Description ==
Spathiurus was designated as a member of the family Ionoscopidae in 2020, as it shows the diagnostic features of the group, making it the first member of the family to be known from the late Cretaceous as well as the Middle East. It is believed to be a sister taxon to Ionoscopus petrarojae, the both are more derived than 'Ionoscopus' cyprinoides, which probably belongs in a different distinct genus. The species Amphilaphurus major is currently believed synonymous with Spathiurus dorsalis.
