= Libanoberyx =

Libanoberyx Temporal range: Cenomanian

Scientific classification
- Kingdom: Animalia
- Phylum: Chordata
- Class: Actinopterygii
- Division: Teleostei
- Order: Beryciformes
- Genus: †Libanoberyx; Gayet, 1980
- Species: †L. spinosus

Binomial name
- †Libanoberyx spinosus Gayet, 1980

Extinct genus of fish

Libanoberyx is an extinct genus of marine trachichthyiform ray-finned fish that lived during the Late Cretaceous (Cenomanian). It contains a single known species, L. spinosus from the Sannine Formation of Lebanon.

== See also ==
- Prehistoric fish
- List of prehistoric bony fish
