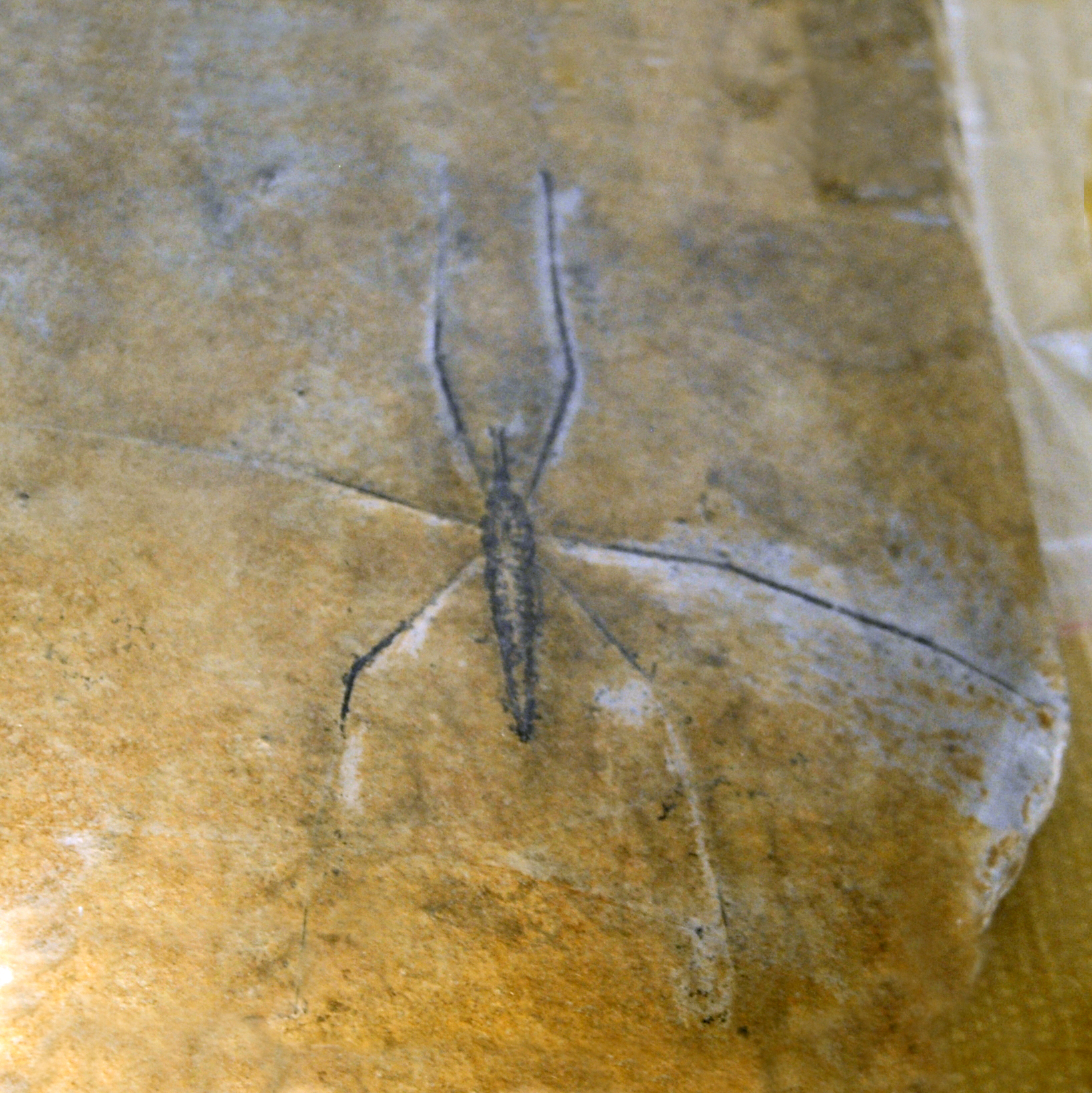
- Fossil specimen of Chresmoda obscura from Germany, on display at Galerie de paléontologie et d'anatomie comparée in Paris

Scientific classification
- Kingdom: Animalia
- Phylum: Arthropoda
- Clade: Pancrustacea
- Class: Insecta
- Family: Chresmodidae
- Genus: †Chresmoda; Germar, 1839

Synonyms
- Propygolampis

= Chresmoda =

Chresmoda Temporal range: Tithonian–Cenomanian

Extinct insect genus

Chresmoda is an extinct genus of insects within the family Chresmodidae.

== Description ==
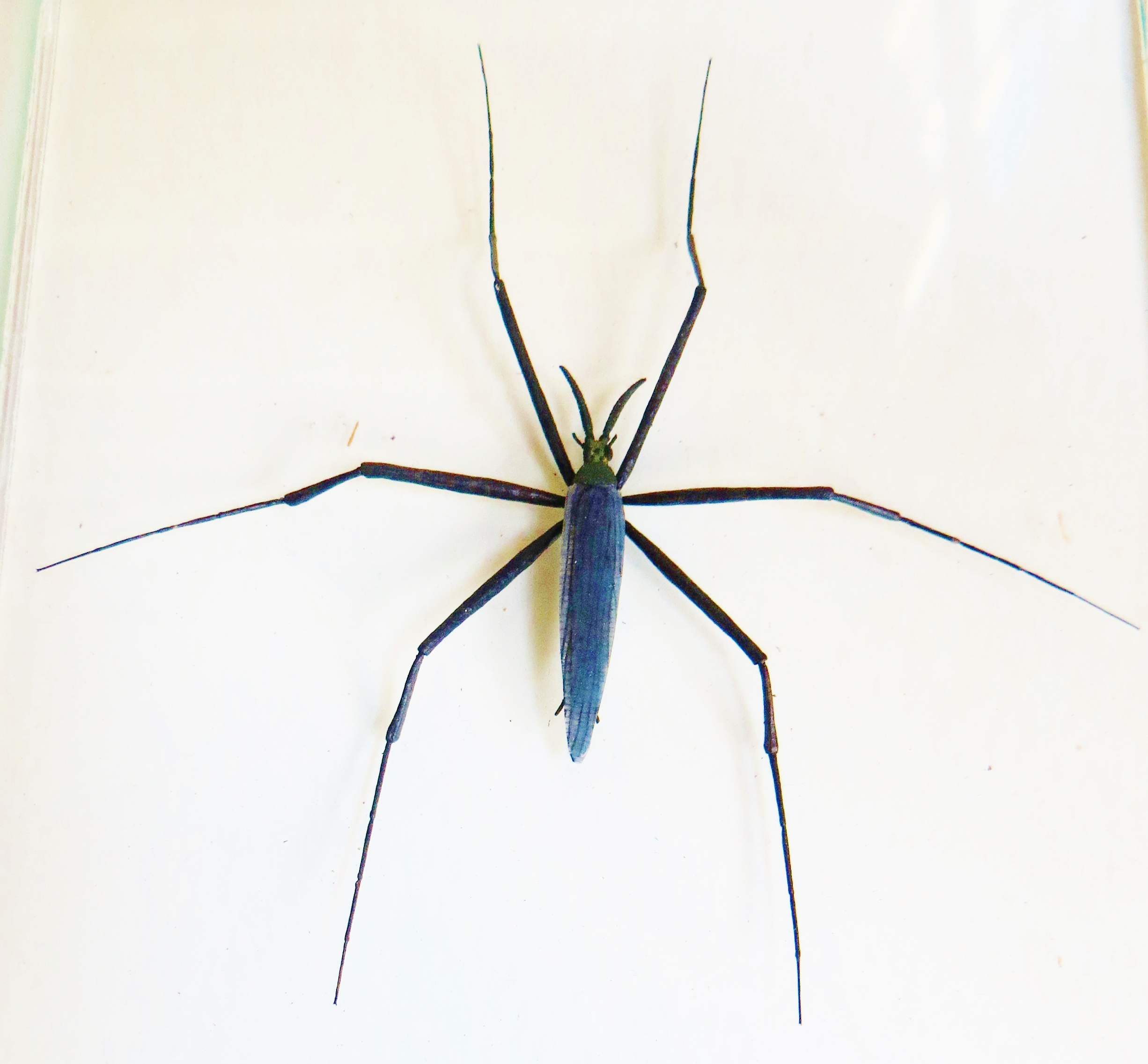
Reconstruction of C.obscura

Chresmoda are large enigmatic insects with very long specialized legs, probably adapted for skating on the water surface similar to pond skaters. They can reach a body length of about 25 millimetres (0.98 in), with a forewing length of about 28 millimetres (1.1 in). Some large specimens could reached a size of about 19 centimetres (7.5 in).

These Polyneoptera of uncertain position have been considered aquatic and living on the water surface, probably predaceous on nektonic small animals.

They lived during the Cretaceous of Brazil, China, Lebanon, Spain, United Kingdom, Mongolia and Myanmar, as well as in the Late Jurassic of Germany, from 150.8 to 93.5 Ma from the Tithonian to the Cenomanian ages. While most species are known from compression fossils, Chresmoda chikuni is known from well preserved 3-dimensional specimens in amber.

== Species ==
- Chresmoda aquatica Martinez-Delclos, 1989 La Pedrera de Rubies Formation and Las Hoyas, Spain, Barremian
- Chresmoda chikuni Zhang & Ge in Zhang et al., 2017 Burmese amber, Myanmar, Cenomanian
- Chresmoda libanica Nel et al., 2004 Sannine Formation, Lebanon, Cenomanian
- Chresmoda multinervis Zhang et al., 2009 Dabeigou Formation, China, Early Cretaceous
- Chresmoda mongolica Ponomarenko, 1986 Gurvan-Eren Formation, Mongolia, Aptian
- Chresmoda neotropica Engel & Heads, 2008 Crato Formation, Brazil, Aptian
- Chresmoda obscura Germar, 1839 Solnhofen Limestone, Germany, Tithonian: can reach a size of about 14 centimetres (5.5 in). These Polyneoptera of uncertain position have been considered aquatic and terrestrial bug or phasmids. They should instead be anomalous paraplecopterids living on the water surface, probably predaceous on nektonic small animals. They lived during the Jurassic of Germany, from 150.8 to 145.5 Ma.
- Chresmoda orientalis Esaki, 1949 Yixian Formation, China, Aptian
- Chresmoda oweni Westwood, 1854 Purbeck Group, United Kingdom, Berriasian
- Chresmoda shihi Zhang et al., 2009 Dabeigou Formation, China, Early Cretaceous
