= Mesoblattinidae =

Mesoblattinidae Temporal range: Anisian–Paleocene

Scientific classification
- Kingdom: Animalia
- Phylum: Arthropoda
- Class: Insecta
- Order: Blattodea
- Family: †Mesoblattinidae; Handlirsch 1906

Genera
- See text

Extinct family of cockroaches

Mesoblattinidae is an extinct, problematic family of cockroaches known from the Mesozoic. It was formerly considered a wastebasket taxon for Mesozoic cockroaches, but the family has subsequently been better defined, with many taxa transferred to Caloblattinidae. It is considered to have close affinities with Blattidae and Ectobiidae, as well as possibly Blaberidae. The family first appeared by the Early Jurassic. They are considered to represent amongst the oldest groups of modern cockroaches, and like them are thought to have laid oothecae. Due to the poor ability of forewing venation to correctly classify cockroaches to extensive homoplasy, the value of this family as a taxonomic unit has been strongly questioned, with some authors considering the family a nomen dubium.

== Systematics ==
Based on

- †Actinoblattula Handlirsch 1906 Çakrazboz Formation, Turkey, Late Triassic (Rhetian)
- †Archimesoblatta Vršanský 2003 Kota Formation, India, Early-Middle Jurassic, Doronino Formation, Russia, Early Cretaceous (Barremian) Dzun-Bain Formation, Mongolia, Zaza Formation, Russia Early Cretaceous (Aptian)
- †Artitocoblatta Handlirsch 1906 Purbeck Group, United Kingdom, Early Cretaceous (Berriasian), La Pedrera de Rúbies Formation, Spain, Barremian
- †Austroblattula Tillyard 1919, Blackstone Formation, Australia, Late Triassic (Norian)
- †Basiblattina Zhang 1997 Dalazi Formation, China, Aptian
- †Breviblattina Vršanský 2004 Shar-Teg, Mongolia, Late Jurassic (Tithonian)
- †Durdlestoneia Handlirsch 1906 Purbeck Group, United Kingdom, Berriasian
- †Gondwablatta Vršanský 2004 Tayasir Formation, Israel, Berriasian
- †Grandocularis Kaddumi 2005 Jordanian amber, Early Cretaceous (Albian)
- †Hispanoblatta Martínez-Delclòs 1993, Las Hoyas, Spain, Barremian
- †Hongaya Handlirsch 1908 Vietnam, Rhaetian
- †Jingyuanoblatta Lin 1982 China, Middle Jurassic
- †Karatavoblatta Vishnyakova 1968 Karabastau Formation, Kazakhstan, Late Jurassic Yixian Formation, China, Aptian
- †Laiyangia Grabau 1923 Laiyang Formation, China, Aptian
- †Lithoblatta Handlirsch 1906 Solnhofen Limestone, Germany, Tithonian
- †Malmoblattina Handlirsch 1906 Purbeck Group, United Kingdom, Berriasian
- †Mesoblatta Hinkelman 2020, Burmese amber, Myanmar, Late Cretaceous (Cenomanian)
- †Mesoblattellina Mendes 2000 Crato Formation, Brazil, Aptian
- †Mesoblattina Geinitz 1880 Guanyintan Formation, China Early Jurassic (Hettangian) Xiangxi Formation, China Early Jurassic (Pliensbachian), Dashankou Formation, Middle Jurassic (Aalenian) Hanshan Formation, China, Middle Jurassic (Bajocian), Houcheng Formation, Houjiatun Formation, Haifanggou Formation, China, Middle Jurassic (Callovian) Green Series, Germany, Early Jurassic (Toarcian), Kyzyl-Kiya, Kyrgyzstan, Pliensbachian Zhargalant Formation, Mongolia, Toarcian, Insektenmergel Formation, Switzerland, Hettangian, Xiagou Formation, China, Aptian Jinju Formation, South Korea, Albian La Pedrera de Rúbies Formation, Spain, Barremian, Purbeck Group, United Kingdom, Berriasian
- †Blattulopsis Pinto 1990 Anfiteatro de Ticó Formation, Argentina, Aptian
- †Brachymesoblatta Vršanský 2003 Dzun-Bain Formation, Mongolia, Aptian
- †Latiblatta Vishnyakova 1968 Karabastau Formation, Kazakhstan, Late Jurassic
- †Nannoblattina Scudder 1886 Charmouth Mudstone Formation, United Kingdom, Early Jurassic (Sinemurian) Purbeck Group, United Kingdom, Berriasian
- †Rhipidoblattinopsis Vishnyakova 1968 Karabastau Formation, Kazakhstan, Late Jurassic
- †Tarakanula Vršanský 2003 Dzun-Bain Formation, Mongolia, Aptian
- †Mesoblattinopsis Mendes 2000 Crato Formation, Brazil, Aptian
- †Mieroblattina Vršanský and Makhoul 2013 Sannine Formation, Lebanon, Cenomanian
- †Mongolblatta Vršanský 2004 Shar-Teg, Mongolia, Tithonian, Doronino Formation, Russia, Barremian
- †Nipponoblatta Fujiyama 1974 Guanyintan Formation, China, Hettangian, Nishinakayama Formation, Japan, Toarcian, Yixian Formation, China, Aptian
- †Nogueroblatta Martínez-Delclòs 1993 La Pedrera de Rúbies Formation, Las Hoyas, Spain, Barremian
- †Nymphoblatta Vršanský and Grimaldi 2004 Lebanese amber, Barremian
- †Perlucipecta Wei and Ren 2013 Crato Formation, Brazil, Aptian Yixian Formation, China, Aptian
- †Praeblattella Vršanský 2003 Dzun-Bain Formation, Mongolia, Aptian Zaza Formation, Russia, Aptian
- †Pulchellablatta Martins-Neto and Gallego 2005 Los Rastros Formation, Argentina, Late Triassic (Carnian)
- †Rhaetoblattina Handlirsch 1908 Vietnam, Rhaetian
- †Schambeloblattina Handlirsch 1906 Insektenmergel Formation, Switzerland, Hettangian
- †Sivis Vršanský 2009 Charentese amber, France, Albian
- †Spinaeblattina Hinkelman 2019 Yixian Formation, China, Aptian, Burmese amber, Myanmar, Cenomanian
- †Stantoniella Handlirsch 1907 Judith River Formation, Montana, Campanian
- †Stenotegmina Lin 1980 Funing Group, China, Paleocene
- †Summatiblatta Lin 1986 Guanyintan Formation, China, Hettangian
- †Turoniblatta Vršanský 2004 Ora Formation, Israel, Late Jurassic (Turonian)
- †Voltziablatta Papier and Grauvogel-Stamm 1995 Grès à Voltzia, France, Anisian
