= Ginsburgia =

Ginsburgia Temporal range: Cenomanian

Scientific classification
- Kingdom: Animalia
- Phylum: Chordata
- Class: Actinopterygii
- Division: Teleostei
- Cohort: Euteleostei
- Genus: †Ginsburgia; Patterson, 1970
- Species: †G. operta

Binomial name
- †Ginsburgia operta Patterson, 1970

Extinct genus of fishes

Ginsburgia is an extinct genus of prehistoric marine ray-finned fish that lived during the Late Cretaceous. It contains a single species, G. operta, from the Cenomanian-aged Sannine Formation of Lebanon. It is thought to be a basal euteleostean of uncertain affinities.

== See also ==
- Prehistoric fish
- List of prehistoric bony fish
