= Humilichthys =

Humilichthys Temporal range: Upper Cenomanian

Scientific classification
- Kingdom: Animalia
- Phylum: Chordata
- Class: Actinopterygii
- Order: †Ctenothrissiformes
- Family: †Pattersonichthyidae
- Genus: †Humilichthys; Gaudant, 1978
- Species: †H. orientalis

Binomial name
- †Humilichthys orientalis Gaudant, 1978

Extinct genus of fishes

Humilichthys is an extinct genus of prehistoric marine ray-finned fish from the Late Cretaceous. It contains a single species, H. orientalis from the upper Cenomanian-aged Sannine Formation of Lebanon.

== See also ==
- Prehistoric fish
- List of prehistoric bony fish
