= Heterothrissa =

Heterothrissa Temporal range: Upper Cenomanian

Scientific classification
- Kingdom: Animalia
- Phylum: Chordata
- Class: Actinopterygii
- Division: Teleostei
- Order: †Ctenothrissiformes
- Family: †Ctenothrissidae
- Genus: †Heterothrissa; Gaudant, 1978
- Species: †H. signeuxae

Binomial name
- †Heterothrissa signeuxae Gaudant, 1978

Extinct genus of fishes

Heterothrissa is an extinct genus of prehistoric marine ray-finned fish that lived during the Late Cretaceous. It contains a single species, H. signeuxae known from the Cenomanian-aged Sannine Formation of Lebanon. It was a member of the Ctenothrissiformes, a group of early-diverging acanthomorph relatives.

== See also ==
- Prehistoric fish
- List of prehistoric bony fish
