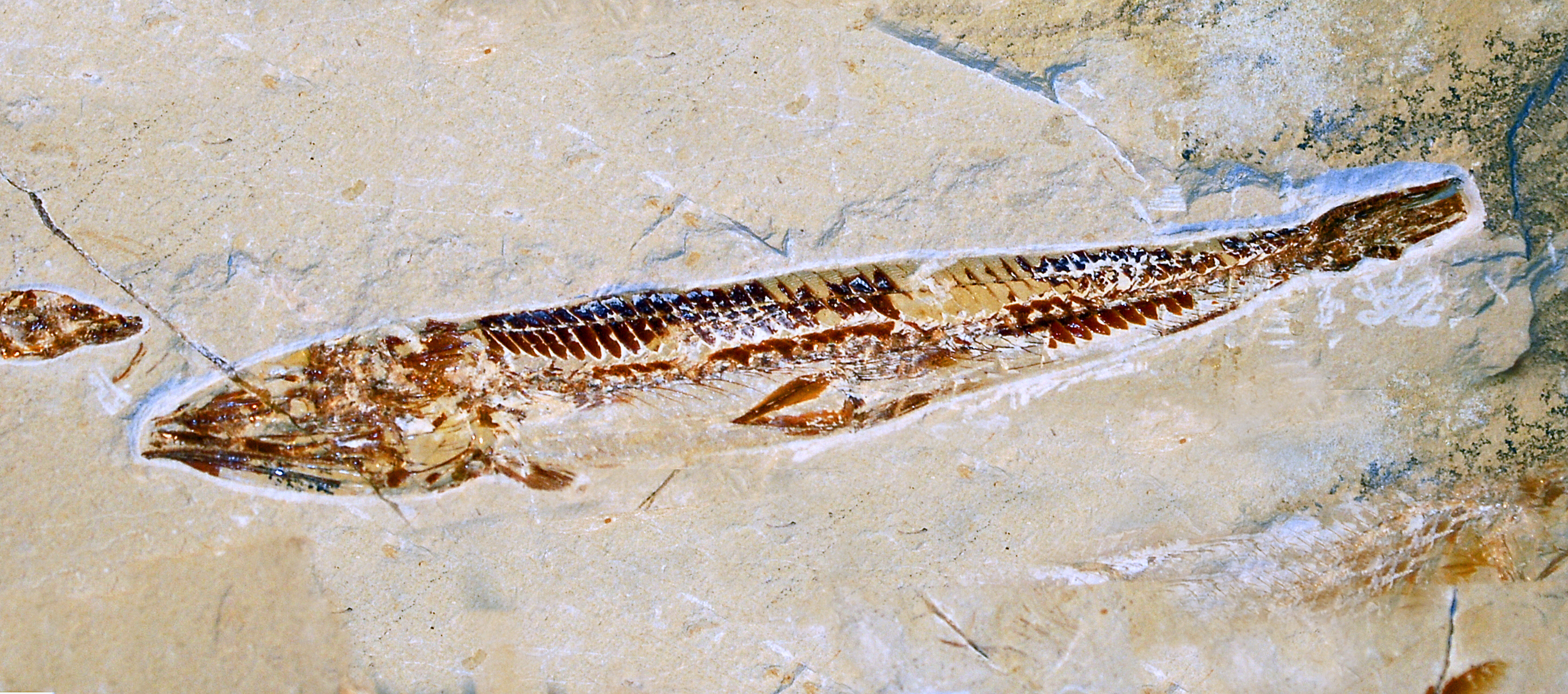
- Fossil of Prionolepis cataphractus from Lebanon

Scientific classification
- Kingdom: Animalia
- Phylum: Chordata
- Class: Actinopterygii
- Order: Alepisauriformes
- Genus: †Prionolepis; Egerton (in Dixon, 1850)

= Prionolepis =

Prionolepis Temporal range: Cenomanian - Turonian

Extinct genus of ray-finned fishes

Prionolepis is a genus of prehistoric ray-finned fish belonging to the order Alepisauriformes.

== Fossil record ==
These ray-finned fish lived in the Upper Cretaceous (Cenomanian - Turonian, about 95-90 million years ago). Fossils have been found in Lebanon and England.

== Description ==
Prionolepis could reach a length of about 25 centimetres (9.8 in). Body was long and tapered, but rather strong and robust, with a series of high serrate scales (hence the name Prionolepis, from the Greek "saw scale"). Its muzzle was pointed and very elongated, and jaw was slightly prognathous.

== Species ==
Species within this genus include:

- †Prionolepis angustus Egerton, 1850
- †Prionolepis cataphractus (Pictet and Humbert, 1866)
- †Prionolepis laniatus Davis, 1887

== Bibliography ==
- Dixon, F., 1850, The Geology and Fossils of the Tertiary and Cretaceous Formations of Sussex, p. 360-377.
- Gallo, V., H. M. A. d. Silva, & F. J. d. Figueiredo. 2005. The interrelationships of †Dercetidae (Neoteleostei, Aulopifromes). pp. 101–104. IN: Poyato-Ariza, F. J. (ed.) Extended Abstracts. Fourth International Meeting on Mesozoic Fishes - Systematics, Homology, and Nomenclature. Ediciones Universidad Autónoma de Madrid, Miraflores de la Sierra, Madrid, Spain August 8–14, 2005, 310 pp.
- Goody, P. C. 1969. The relationships of certain Upper Cretaceous teleosts with special reference to the myctophoids. 7:1-255. Age: Cretaceous-Cretaceous Late; Cretaceous-Cretaceous Late-Senonian; Cretaceous-Cretaceous Late-Turonian; Cretaceous-Cretaceous Late-Cenomanian middle;.
- Hay, O. P. 1903. On a collection of Upper Cretaceous fishes from Mount Lebanon, Syria, with descriptions of four new genera and nineteen new species. American Museum of Natural History, Bulletin 19:395-452.
- Hilda M. A. Silva; Valéria Gallo: Taxonomic review and phylogenetic analysis of Enchodontoidei (Teleostei: Aulopiformes). Anais da Academia Brasileira de Ciências ISSN 0001-3765 doi:10.1590/S0001-37652011000200010
- Joseph S. Nelson: Fishes of the World. John Wiley & Sons, 2006, ISBN 0-471-25031-7
- Karl Albert Frickhinger: Fossilien Atlas Fische, Mergus-Verlag, Melle, 1999, ISBN 3-88244-018-X
- Larson, P. L. 1988. Famous fossil fish faunas. Mid-America Paleontology Society Digest 11:1-10.
- Peter L. Forey, Lu Yi, Colin Patterson and Cliff E. Davies, 2003. Fossil fishes from the Cenomanian (Upper Cretaceous) of Namoura, Lebanon. Journal of Systematic Palaeontology (2003), 1:4:227-330 Cambridge University Press The Natural History Museum
