= Microcapros =

Microcapros Temporal range: Cenomanian

Scientific classification
- Kingdom: Animalia
- Phylum: Chordata
- Class: Actinopterygii
- Genus: †Microcapros; Gayet, 1980

Microcapros is an extinct genus of prehistoric bony fish that lived during the Cenomanian.

== See also ==
- Prehistoric fish
- List of prehistoric bony fish
