= Natural History Museum, Grenoble =

Museum in Grenoble, France

Coordinates: 45.1880°N 5.7352°E

- Muséum d'histoire naturelle de Grenoble
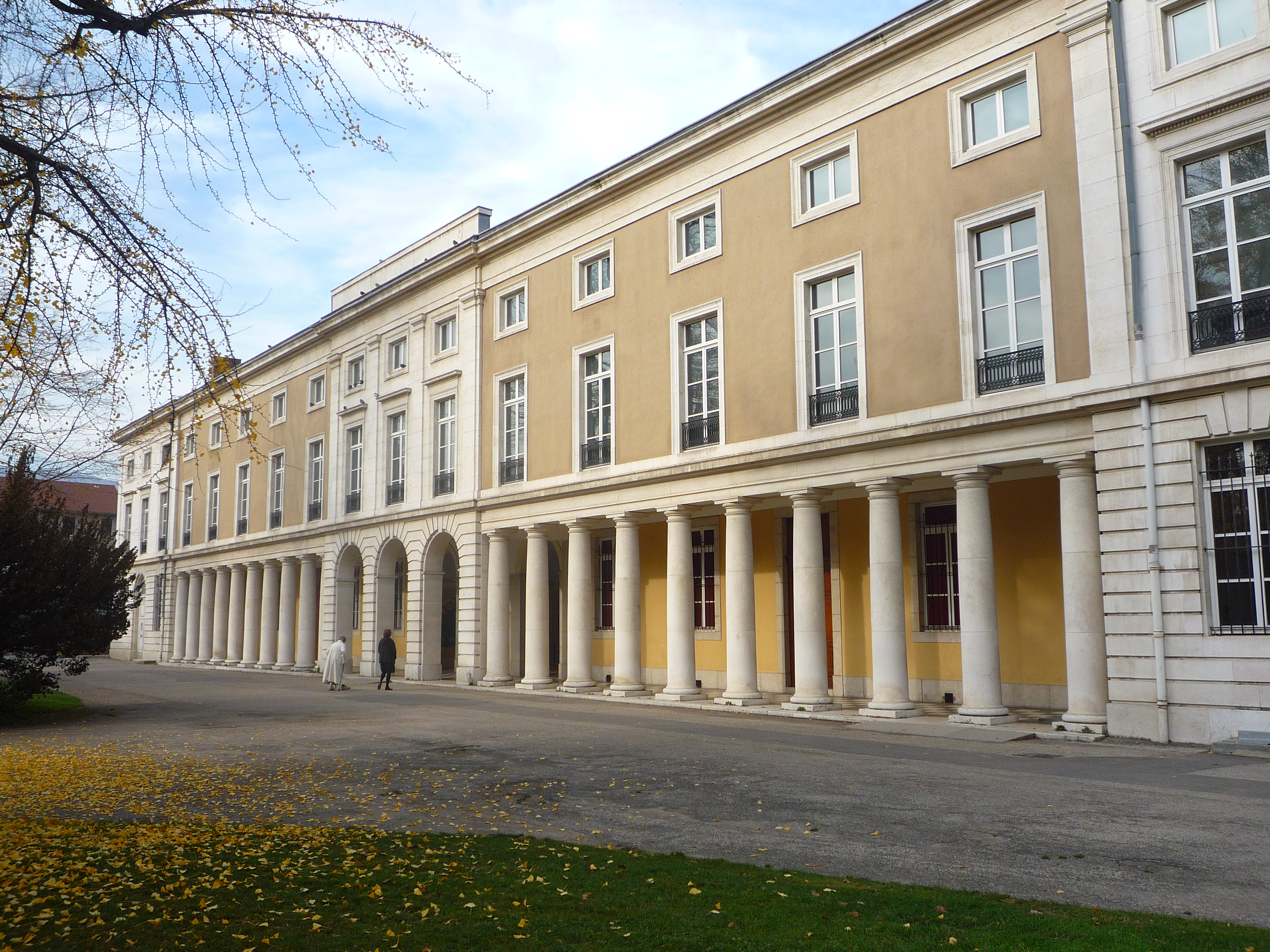

The Natural History Museum of Grenoble (French: Muséum d'histoire naturelle de Grenoble) is a municipal museum founded in 1851, in Grenoble, France. Since the opening of the building in 1855, it has showcased a rich natural heritage, in particular, alpine heritage. The museum houses a collection of one and a half million objects and specimens in the disciplines of botany, zoology, geology and even ethnology. Facades and roofs on the edge of the Jardin des Plantes (Plants Garden) have been listed as historical monuments since January 24, 1944.

== History ==
In 1772, notables from Grenoble, including Doctor Henri Gagnon (1728–1813), maternal grandfather of Stendhal, launched a subscription aimed at acquiring the library of the late Monsignor Jean de Caulet, Bishop of Grenoble.

Father Étienne Ducros, friend and protege of Henri Gagnon, became the second librarian and first "guard of the natural history cabinet", then installed in the Jesuit college and adjacent to the public library.

The collections of Father Ducros himself, the minerals of Christophe Pajot de Marcheval (1724–1792), Intendant of Dauphiné, the cabinet of curiosities of Joseph-Claude Raby, as well as objects from the cabinet of curiosities of the Abbey of Saint-Antoine ceded on September 25, 1777 by its last abbot, Jean Marie Navarre, constitute the first collections.

Jacques-Joseph Champollion-Figeac from 1807 to 1816 then Pierre Antoine Amédée Ducoin (1777–1851) from 1816 to 1825, then succeeded one another at the head of the Grenoble Library and therefore of the Natural History Cabinet (it should be understood at the "Library" era as library AND natural history cabinet). The first private institution became municipal in 1814.

The doctor Albin Crépu (1799–1859) in turn became guard of the Cabinet of Natural History in Grenoble from 1825. Until 1847, he exercised the dual function of guard of the Cabinet of Natural History and professor of botany at the Garden of plants. It was under his direction that the City of Grenoble acquired the herbarium of Dominique Villars (1745–1814).

In 1847, Albin Crépu was ousted in favor of Louis Hippolyte Bouteille (1804–1881).

On June 9, 1845, the mayor of Grenoble, Frédéric Taulier, made a presentation to the city council on the creation of a new building for the museum's collections. On December 3, he makes the decision to enlarge the Cabinet. Change in size and location, but also in name: the Cabinet becomes a Museum.

The museum has a public scientific library, specializing in the field of natural sciences, and rich in an important heritage fund. In 2015, a specific exhibition installed in the orangery retraces the museum's acquisitions over the past twenty years of minerals, stuffed animals and plants. The average annual attendance in recent years is around 80,000 visitors. In addition, since 1980, the museum has hosted a cultural association supporting its activities under the name Les Amis du Museum d'histoire naturelle de Grenoble.
