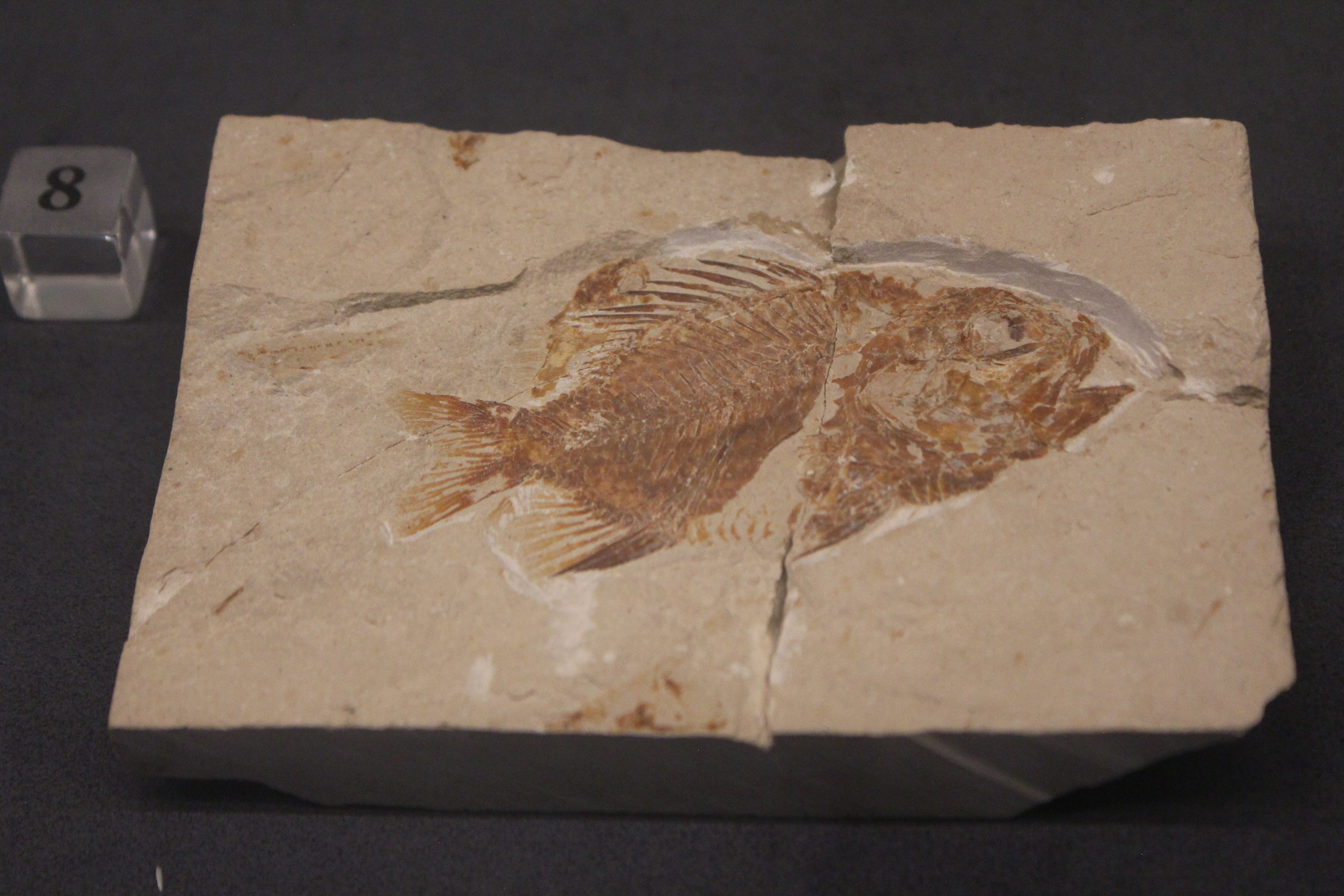
- S. liratus fossil, University of Michigan Museum of Natural History

Scientific classification
- Domain: Eukaryota
- Kingdom: Animalia
- Phylum: Chordata
- Class: Actinopterygii
- Order: Beryciformes
- Genus: †Stichocentrus; Patterson, 1967

= Stichocentrus =

Stichocentrus Temporal range: Cenomanian

Extinct genus of fishes

Stichocentrus is an extinct genus of prehistoric bony fish that lived during the Cenomanian.

== See also ==
- Prehistoric fish
- List of prehistoric bony fish
