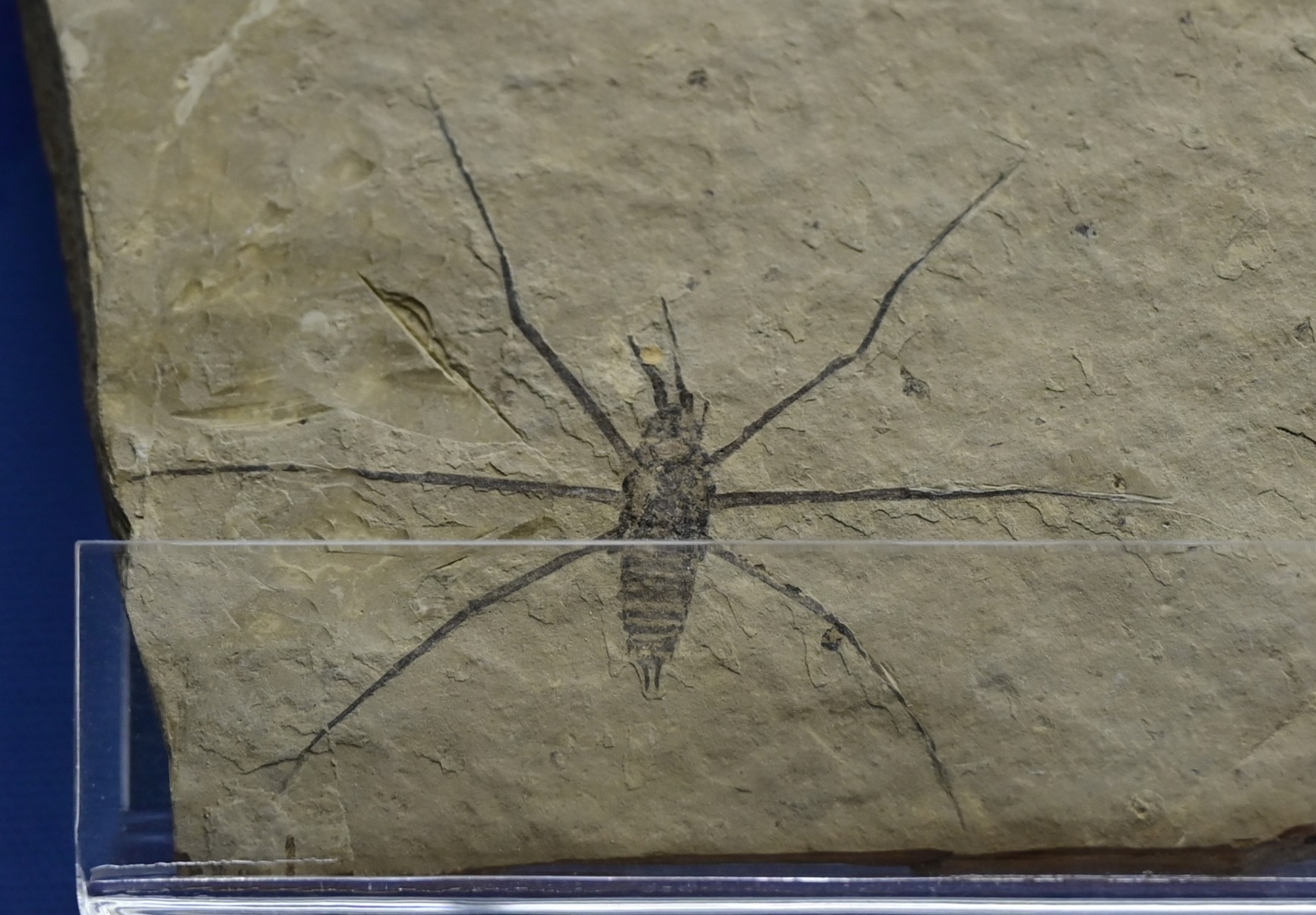
- Sinochresmoda, National Natural History Museum of China

Scientific classification
- Kingdom: Animalia
- Phylum: Arthropoda
- Clade: Pancrustacea
- Class: Insecta
- Cohort: Polyneoptera
- Family: Chresmodidae; Haase 1890

= Chresmodidae =

Chresmodidae Temporal range: Middle Jurassic–Cenomanian

Extinct family of insects

Chresmodidae is an extinct family of Mesozoic insects within the superorder Polyneoptera.

== Genera ==
- Chresmoda Late Jurassic-Cenomanian, Worldwide
- Jurachresmoda Zhang, Ren & Shih, 2008 Middle Jurassic, Jiulongshan Formation
- Sinochresmoda Zhang, Ren & Pang, 2008 Early Cretaceous, Yixian Formation

Prochresmoda from the Triassic of Kyrgyzstan is not currently considered part of the group and is considered to be more closely related to Triassophasma and Palaeochresmoda.

Their affinities within the Polyneoptera have long been considered uncertain. Some authors have suggested that they represent a derived group of cockroaches.

== Description ==
Chresmodidae are large enigmatic insects with very long specialized legs, probably adapted for skating on the water surface, similar to extant water skaters. They can reach a size of about 17 centimetres (6.7 in). and even 19 centimetres (7.5 in).

These Polyneoptera of uncertain position have been considered aquatic, living on the water surface, probably predaceous on nektonic small animals.

They lived during the Cretaceous of Brazil, China, Lebanon, Spain, United Kingdom, as well as in the Jurassic of Germany and China, from ~166.0 to 94.3 Ma.
