= Phoenicolepis =

Phoenicolepis Temporal range: Upper Cenomanian

Scientific classification
- Domain: Eukaryota
- Kingdom: Animalia
- Phylum: Chordata
- Class: Actinopterygii
- Order: †Ctenothrissiformes
- Genus: †Phoenicolepis; Gaudant, 1978

Extinct genus of fishes

Phoenicolepis is an extinct genus of prehistoric bony fish that lived during the upper Cenomanian.

== See also ==
- Prehistoric fish
- List of prehistoric bony fish
