= Pateroperca =

Pateroperca Temporal range: Upper Cenomanian

Scientific classification
- Kingdom: Animalia
- Phylum: Chordata
- Class: Actinopterygii
- Division: Teleostei
- Order: †Ctenothrissiformes
- Genus: †Pateroperca; Woodward, 1942

Extinct genus of fishes

Pateroperca is an extinct genus of prehistoric bony fish that lived during the upper Cenomanian.

== See also ==
- Prehistoric fish
- List of prehistoric bony fish
