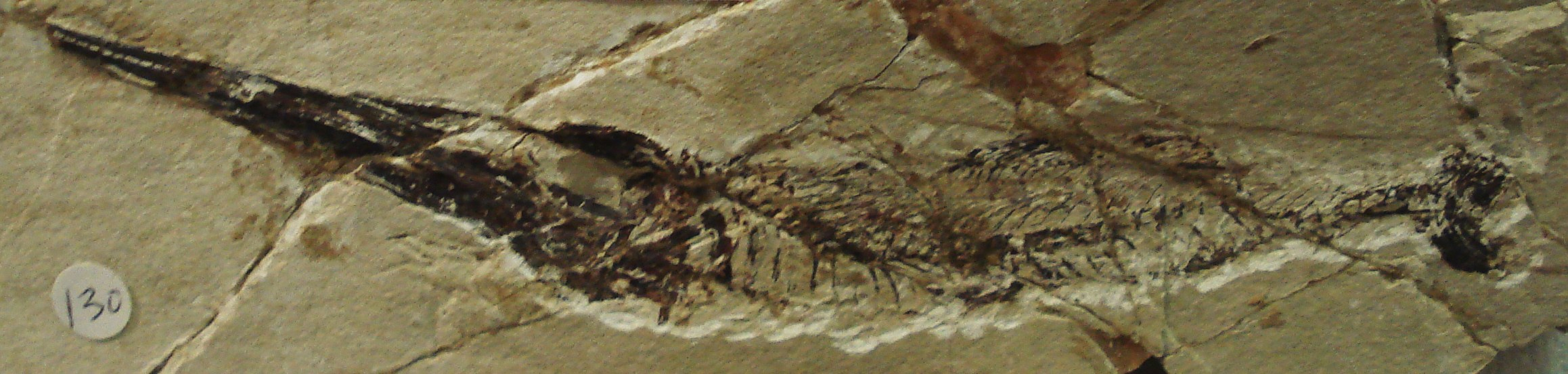
- Fossil specimen

Scientific classification
- Kingdom: Animalia
- Phylum: Chordata
- Class: Actinopterygii
- Order: Aulopiformes
- Superfamily: †Ichthyotringoidea
- Family: †Apateopholidae; Goody, 1969
- Genus: †Apateopholis; Woodward, 1891
- Species: †A. laniatus

Binomial name
- †Apateopholis laniatus (Davis, 1887)

Synonyms
- Rhinellus laniatus Davis, 1887

= Apateopholis =

Apateopholis Temporal range: Cenomanian

Extinct genus of ray-finned fishes

Apateopholis (meaning "confusing scale") is an extinct genus of prehistoric marine ray-finned fish. It is the only member of the family Apateopholidae and contains a single species, A. laniatus, from the Cenomanian of Lebanon. It was a relative of modern lizardfish and lancetfish in the order Aulopiformes. At least one study has found it to be a potential sister genus to the enigmatic Yabrudichthys of the West Bank.
