= Pattersonichthys =

Pattersonichthys Temporal range: Upper Cenomanian

Scientific classification
- Domain: Eukaryota
- Kingdom: Animalia
- Phylum: Chordata
- Class: Actinopterygii
- Order: †Ctenothrissiformes
- Genus: †Pattersonichthys; Goody, 1969

Extinct genus of fishes

Pattersonichthys is an extinct genus of prehistoric bony fish that lived during the upper Cenomanian.

== See also ==
- Prehistoric fish
- List of prehistoric bony fish
