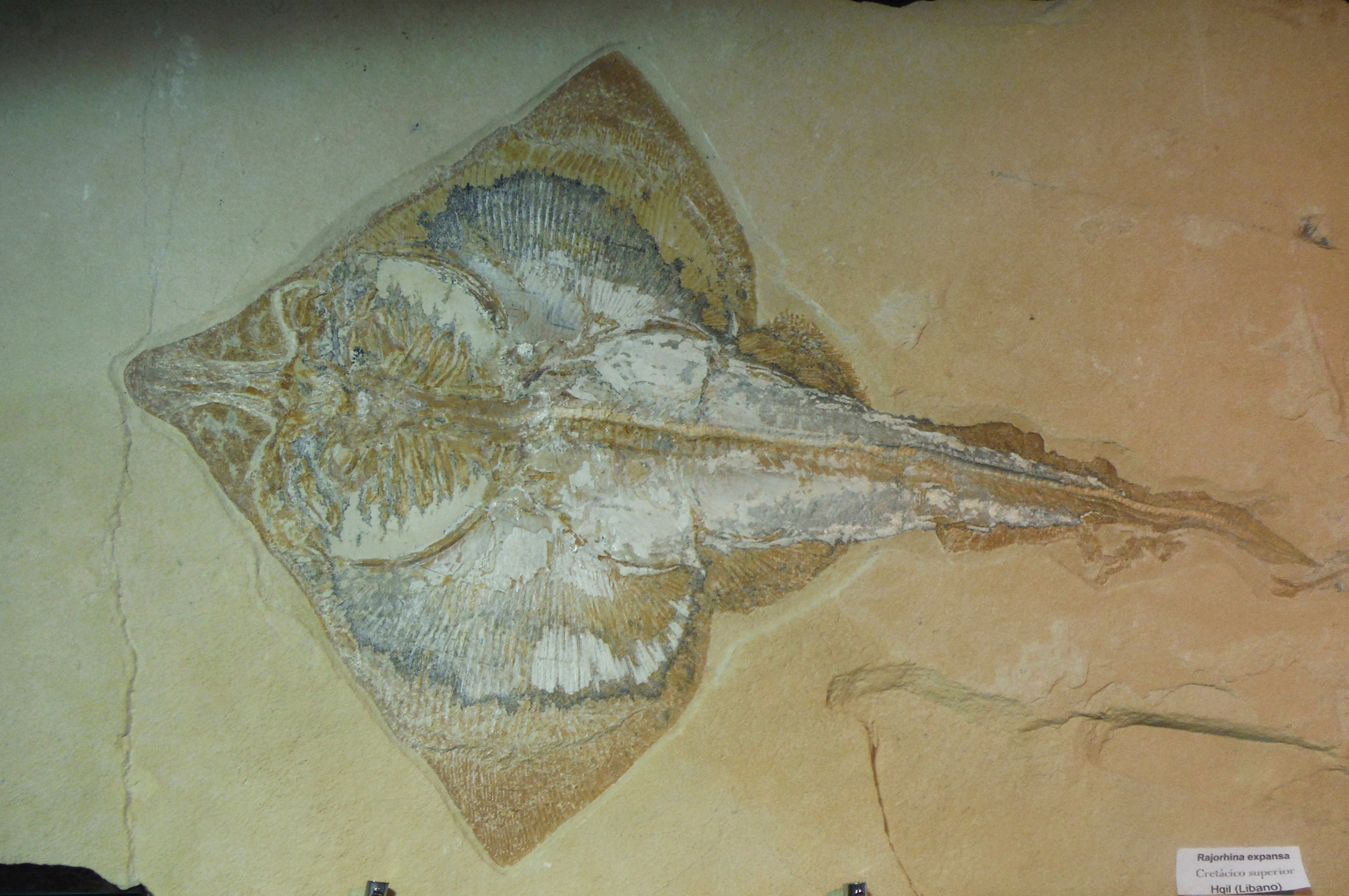
- Rajorhina expansa

Scientific classification
- Kingdom: Animalia
- Phylum: Chordata
- Class: Chondrichthyes
- Subclass: Elasmobranchii
- Order: Rajiformes
- Family: Rajidae
- Genus: †Rajorhina; Jaekel, 1894

= Rajorhina =

Rajorhina Temporal range: Upper Cretaceous

Extinct genus of cartilaginous fishes

Rajorhina is an extinct genus of stingray-like skate from the Upper Cretaceous of what is now Lebanon. It is the only known fossil-only genus of the family Rajidae The genus is typified by a Rhombus form.

From its taxonomy a few things have been inferred about it. It likely lived in a marine environment and it was phosphatic based on its subphylum. It was actively mobile and a carnivore.
