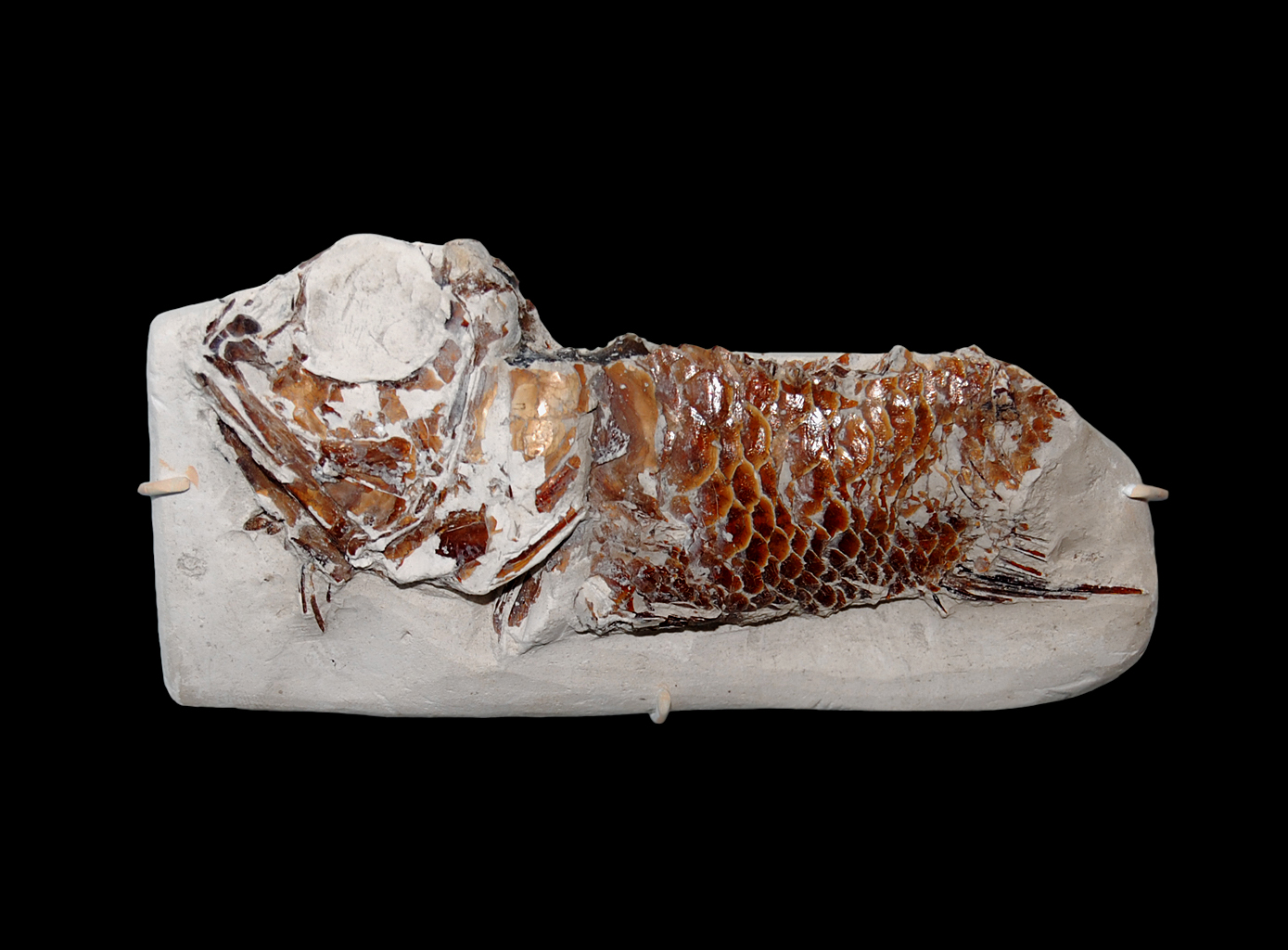
- Specimen at Oxford University Museum of Natural History

Scientific classification
- Kingdom: Animalia
- Phylum: Chordata
- Class: Actinopterygii
- Order: †Ctenothrissiformes
- Family: †Aulolepidae
- Genus: †Aulolepis; Agassiz, 1844
- Species: †A. typus

Binomial name
- †Aulolepis typus Agassiz, 1844

= Aulolepis =

Aulolepis Temporal range: Middle Cenomanian-Late Turonian

Extinct genus of fishes

Aulolepis (from Greek: ανλος aulos, 'pipe' and Greek: λεπίς lepis 'scale') is an extinct genus of prehistoric marine ray-finned fish that lived from the middle Cenomanian to the late Turonian. It contains a single species, A. typus from the Chalk Group of the United Kingdom and the Hesseltal Formation of Germany.

It is generally classified as a member of the Ctenothrissiformes, a group of basal mid-Cretaceous acanthomorphs. However, one as-of-yet unpublished study has found it to be an aulopiform instead.
