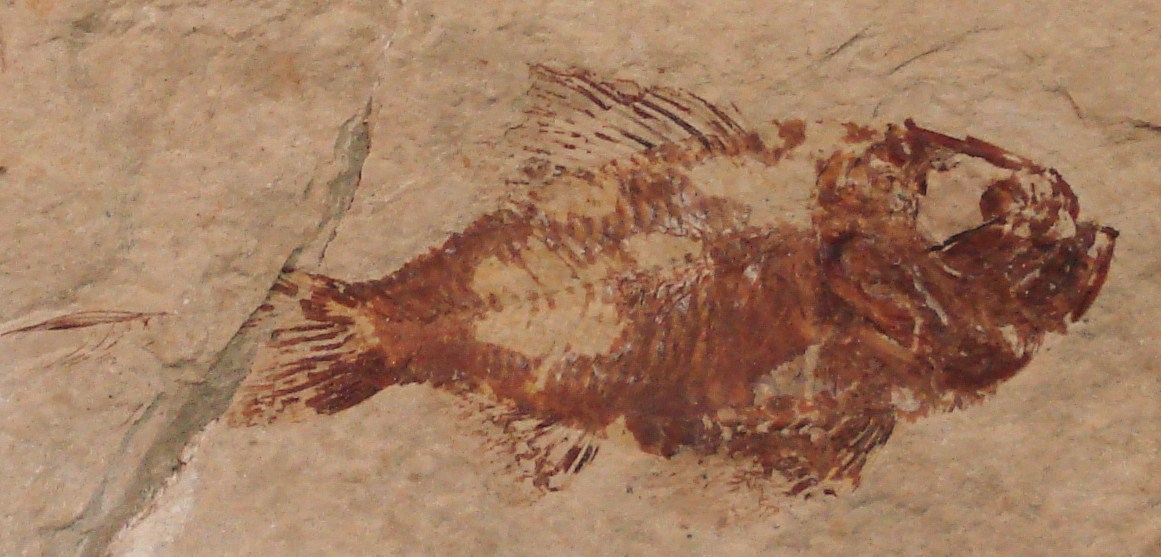
- Fossil of Ctenothrissa vexillifer

Scientific classification
- Kingdom: Animalia
- Phylum: Chordata
- Class: Actinopterygii
- Clade: Acanthomorpha
- Order: †Ctenothrissiformes; Berg 1937

Families
- Aulolepidae Patterson 1964; Ctenothrissidae Woodward 1901; Pattersonichthyidae Gaudant, 1976

Synonyms
- Ctenothrissoidei

= Ctenothrissiformes =

Ctenothrissiformes Temporal range: Late Cretaceous, Cenomanian–Turonian

Extinct order of fishes

Ctenothrissiformes is an extinct order of prehistoric acanthomorph ray-finned fish, known from the mid-late Cretaceous of Europe and the Middle East.

== Taxonomy ==
- Order Ctenothrissiformes Berg 1937
  - Family †Aulolepidae Patterson, 1964
    - Genus †Aulolepis Agassiz 1836 non Geinitz 1849
      - †A. reussi Geinitz 1849
      - †A. typa Agassiz 1844
    - Genus †Cyclolepis Geinitz 1868 non Gillies ex Don 1832 non Moquin-Tandon 1834
      - †C. agassizi Geinitz 1868
      - †C. stenodina Cockerell 1919
  - Family †Ctenothrissidae Woodward 1901
    - Genus †Heterothrissa Gaudant 1978
      - †Heterothrissa signeuxae Gaudant 1978
    - Genus †Ctenothrissa Woodward 1899
      - †C. enigmatica Gaudant 1978
      - †C. microcephala (Agassiz 1835-1838) [Beryx microcephalus Agassiz 1835-1838]
      - †C. protodorsalis Gaudant 1978
      - †C. radians (Agassiz 1835-1838) [Beryx radians Agassiz 1835-1838]
      - †C. signifer Hay 1903
      - †C. vexillifer (Pictet 1850) [Beryx vexillifer Pictet 1850]
  - Family †Pattersonichthyidae Gaudant, 1976
    - †Humilichthys Gaudant, 1978
    - †Pateroperca Woodward, 1942
    - †Pattersonichthys Goody, 1969
    - †Phoenicolepis Gaudant, 1978

During the mid-20th century, it was briefly suspected that the ctenothrissiforms could be a Lazarus taxon that survived to the modern day, based on the discovery of specimens of the deep-sea fish "Macristium", which closely resembled the extinct Ctenothrissa. However, further discoveries of "Macristium" specimens proved that this genus actually represented the larval form of the aulopiform Bathysaurus, refuting the speculation over surviving ctenothrissiforms.

Some authors instead place the families of this order within the Myctophiformes, while others keep Ctenothrissidae and Pattersonichthyidae within the Ctenothrissiformes, but move Aulolepidae to the Myctophiformes, or consider the Pattersonichthyidae to be indeterminate acanthomorphs.
