= Pattersonoberyx =

Pattersonoberyx Temporal range: Cenomanian

Scientific classification
- Kingdom: Animalia
- Phylum: Chordata
- Class: Actinopterygii
- Order: Beryciformes
- Genus: †Pattersonoberyx; Gayet, 1980

Extinct genus of fishes

Pattersonoberyx is an extinct genus of prehistoric bony fish that lived during the Cenomanian.

== See also ==
- Prehistoric fish
- List of prehistoric bony fish
