= 2014 in paleoichthyology =

This list of fossil fishes described in 2014 is a list of new taxa of placoderms, fossil cartilaginous fishes and bony fishess of every kind that have been described during the year 2014, as well as other significant discoveries and events related to paleontology of fishes that occurred in the year 2014. The list only includes taxa at the level of genus or species.

== Research ==
- An overview of adaptations for locomotion in water in fossil fishes is published by Fletcher et al. (2014).
- New fossil material of the Cambrian chordate Metaspriggina walcotti is described by Conway Morris and Caron (2014), who reinterpret M. walcotti as a primitive fish.
- A study of relationships and character distributions of early gnathostomes, including placoderms and acanthodians, is published by Brazeau and Friedman (2014).
- Cranial anatomy of the placoderm Romundina stellina is described by Dupret et al. (2014).
- A specimen of the ischnacanthiform acanthodian Nerepisacanthus denisoni is described from the Late Silurian Bertie Formation of southern Ontario, Canada by Burrow and Rudkin (2014).
- A specimen of the acanthodian Acanthodes bridgei with preserved tissues of its eye, which provides the first record of mineralized rods and cones in a fossil, is described from the Late Carboniferous Hamilton Formation in Kansas, USA by Tanaka et al. (2014).
- An analysis of the fossil record of Carcharocles megalodon, intending to establish its date of extinction, is published by Pimiento and Clements (2014).
- A study of the phylogenetic relationships of the Triassic halecomorph Archaeosemionotus connectens is published by López-Arbarello, Stockar and Bürgin (2014).
- Triassic scanilepiform neopterygian species Fukangichthys longidorsalis is revised by Xu, Gao and Finarelli (2014).
- A study of the phylogenetic interrelationships of lampridiform teleosts and of their Late Cretaceous relatives, is published by Davesne et al. (2014).
- A virtual cranial endocast of the lungfish Rhinodipterus kimberleyensis from the Late Devonian Gogo Formation of Australia is presented by Clement and Ahlberg (2014).
- A study on the histology of the humerus of Eusthenopteron is published by Sanchez, Tafforeau & Ahlberg (2014).

== New taxa ==
=== Newly named jawless vertebrates ===
Name	Novelty	Status	Authors	Age	Unit	Location	Notes	Images
Dartmuthia procera	Sp. nov	Valid	Märss, Afanassieva & Blom	Silurian (late Gorstian to Ludfordian)		Estonia; Latvia	An osteostracan related to Tremataspis, a species of Dartmuthia.	
Dentapelta	Gen. et sp. nov	Valid	Scott & Wilson	Early Devonian (Lochkovian)		Canada	An osteostracan related to Superciliaspis. The type species is Dentapelta loefflerae.	
Eldaaspis	Gen. et sp. nov	Valid	Märss, Afanassieva & Blom	Silurian (late Homerian)		Estonia	A tremataspidiform osteostracan of uncertain phylogenetic placement. The type species is Eldaaspis miklii.	
Glabrapelta	Gen. et 2 sp. nov	Valid	Scott & Wilson	Early Devonian (Lochkovian)		Canada	An osteostracan related to Superciliaspis. Genus contains two species: G. cristata and G. minima.	
Meelaidaspis	Gen. et sp. nov	Valid	Märss, Afanassieva & Blom	Silurian (late Homerian)		Estonia	An osteostracan of uncertain phylogenetic placement, possibly a member of Cephalaspidiformes. The type species is Meelaidaspis gennadii.	
Ohesaareaspis	Gen. et sp. nov	Valid	Märss, Afanassieva & Blom	Late Silurian (Pridoli)		Estonia	An osteostracan of uncertain phylogenetic placement, possibly a member of Cephalaspidiformes. The type species is Ohesaareaspis ponticulata.	
Tahulaspis	Gen. et 2 sp. nov	Valid	Märss, Afanassieva & Blom	Late Silurian		Estonia; Latvia	A tremataspidiform osteostracan of uncertain phylogenetic placement. The type species is Tahulaspis ordinata; genus also contains Tahulaspis praevia.	
Tremataspis perforata	Sp. nov	Valid	Märss, Afanassieva & Blom	Silurian (late Homerian to late Gorstian)		Estonia	An osteostracan, a species of Tremataspis''.	

=== Newly named placoderms ===
Name	Novelty	Status	Authors	Age	Unit	Location	Notes	Images
Antineosteus rufus	Sp. nov	Valid	Vaškaninová & Kraft	Devonian (late Emsian)		Czech Republic	A homostiid, species of Antineosteus.	
Barwickosteus	Gen. et sp. nov	Valid	Young & Long	Late Middle Devonian	Aztec Siltstone	Antarctica (Victoria Land)	A phlyctaeniid arthrodire. The type species is Barwickosteus antarcticus.	
Grifftaylor	Gen. et sp. nov	Valid	Young & Long	Late Middle Devonian	Aztec Siltstone	Antarctica (Victoria Land)	A phlyctaeniid arthrodire. The type species is Grifftaylor antarcticus.	
Richardosteus	Gen. et sp. nov	Valid	Long, Mark-Kurik & Young	Early Devonian		Australia	A buchanosteid arthrodire. The type species is Richardosteus barwickorum.	
Urvaspis	Gen. et sp. nov	Valid	Long, Mark-Kurik & Young	Early Devonian		Russia	A buchanosteid arthrodire. The type species is Urvaspis lithuanica.	

=== Newly named acanthodians ===
Name	Novelty	Status	Authors	Age	Unit	Location	Notes	Images
Obruchevacanthus	Gen. et sp. nov	Valid	Botella et al.	Early Devonian		Spain	An ischnacanthiform acanthodian. The type species is Obruchevacanthus ireneae.	

=== Newly named cartilaginous fishes ===
Name	Novelty	Status	Authors	Age	Unit	Location	Notes	Images
Acanthorhachis	Gen. et comb. nov	Valid	Martill, Del Strother & Gallien	Carboniferous (Viséan to Westphalian)		United Kingdom	A shark, possibly a relative of Listracanthus. A new genus for "Listracanthus" spinatus Bolton (1896).	
Acrodus kalasinensis	Sp. nov	Valid	Cuny et al.	Late Jurassic or Early Cretaceous	Phu Kradung Formation	Thailand	An acrodontine hybodontid, a species of Acrodus.	
Antrigoulia	Gen. et sp. nov	Valid	Guinot, Cappetta & Adnet	Early Cretaceous (Valanginian)		France	A palaeospinacid synechodontiform neoselachian. The type species is Antrigoulia circumplicata.	
Archaeogaleus	Gen. et sp. nov	Valid	Guinot, Cappetta & Adnet	Early Cretaceous (Valanginian)		France	A requiem shark. The type species is Archaeogaleus lengadocensis.	
Cadiera	Gen. et sp. nov	Valid	Guinot, Cappetta & Adnet	Early Cretaceous (Valanginian)		France	A catshark. The type species is Cadiera camboensis.	
Cantioscyllium grandis	Sp. nov	Valid	Cicimurri, Ciampaglio & Runyon	Late Cretaceous	Eutaw Formation	United States	A member of Ginglymostomatidae, a species of Cantioscyllium.	
Cetorhinus huddlestoni	Sp. nov	Valid	Welton	Middle Miocene	Sharktooth Hill Bonebed	United States	A relative of the basking shark.	
Chlamydoselachus landinii	Sp. nov	Valid	Carrillo-Briceño, Aguilera & Rodriguez	Middle to late Miocene	Angostura Formation	Ecuador	A member of the family Chlamydoselachidae. Originally described as a species of Chlamydoselachus; Cappetta, Morrison & Adnet (2019) transferred it to the genus Rolfodon.	
Copodus lebedevi	Sp. nov	Valid	Lyapin & Bagirov	Early Carboniferous (Serpukhovian)		Russia	A member of Copodontiformes, a species of Copodus.	
Echinorhinus vielhus	Sp. nov	Valid	Guinot, Cappetta & Adnet	Early Cretaceous (Valanginian)		France	A species of Echinorhinus.	
Fissodopsis	Gen. et sp. nov	Valid	Lund, Grogan & Fath	Carboniferous (Serpukhovian)	Heath Formation	United States	A member of Petalodontiformes. The type species is Fissodopsis robustus.	
Garrigascyllium	Gen. et sp. nov	Valid	Guinot, Cappetta & Adnet	Early Cretaceous (Valanginian)		France	A carpet shark of uncertain phylogenetic placement. The type species is Garrigascyllium aganticensis.	
Gladioserratus dentatus	Sp. nov	Valid	Guinot, Cappetta & Adnet	Early Cretaceous (Valanginian)		France	A cow shark, a species of Gladioserratus.	
Kanodus	Gen. et sp. nov	Valid	Lebedev in Ivanov & Lebedev	Middle Permian		Russia	A psephodontid cochliodontiform holocephalan. The type species is Kanodus robustus.	
Lonchidion cristatum	Sp. nov	Valid	Cicimurri, Ciampaglio & Runyon	Late Cretaceous	Eutaw Formation	United States	A member of Hybodontiformes, a species of Lonchidion.	
Lonchidion paramilloensis	Sp. nov	Valid	Johns, Albanesi & Voldman	Middle–Late Triassic (Ladinian–Carnian)	Paramillo Formation	Argentina	A species of Lonchidion.	
Magistrauia	Gen. et sp. nov	Valid	Guinot, Cappetta & Adnet	Early Cretaceous (Valanginian)		France	A carpet shark of uncertain phylogenetic placement. The type species is Magistrauia unicaplicata.	
Megachasma applegatei	Sp. nov	Valid	Shimada, Welton & Long	Late Oligocene to early Miocene (late Chattian to Aquitanian)		United States	A relative of the megamouth shark.	
Meristodonoides multiplicatus	Sp. nov	Valid	Cicimurri, Ciampaglio & Runyon	Late Cretaceous	Eutaw Formation	United States	A member of Hybodontidae, a species of Meristodonoides.	
Myledaphus pustulosus	Sp. nov	Valid	Cook et al.	Late Cretaceous (Maastrichtian) and Cretaceous-Paleogene boundary	Bug Creek Anthills; Hell Creek Formation; Scollard Formation	Canada; United States	A member of Rajiformes related to guitarfishes, a species of Myledaphus.	
Obruchevodus	Gen. et sp. nov	Valid	Grogan, Lund & Fath	Carboniferous (Mississippian)	Bear Gulch Limestone	United States	A petalodontiform chondrichthyan. The type species is Obruchevodus griffithi.	
Occitanodus	Gen. et sp. nov	Valid	Guinot, Cappetta & Adnet	Early Cretaceous (Valanginian)		France	An orthacodontid hexanchiform. The type species is Occitanodus sudrei.	
Omanoselache halli	Sp. nov	Valid	Koot & Cuny in Koot et al.	Early Triassic (late Olenekian)		Oman	A hybodontiform shark of uncertain phylogenetic placement, a species of Omanoselache.	
Ornatoscyllium rugasimulatum	Sp. nov	Valid	Guinot, Cappetta & Adnet	Early Cretaceous (Valanginian)		France	A carpet shark of uncertain phylogenetic placement. Originally described as a species of Ornatoscyllium, but subsequently transferred to the genus Similiteroscyllium.	
Ozarcus	Gen. et sp. nov	Valid	Pradel et al.	Carboniferous	Fayetteville Formation	United States	Probably a member of Falcatidae. The type species is Ozarcus mapesae.	
Paracestracion pectinatus	Sp. nov	Valid	Guinot, Cappetta & Adnet	Early Cretaceous (Valanginian)		France	Originally interpreted as a bullhead shark and a species of Paracestracion; excluded from the family Heterodontidae by Hovestadt (2018).	
Parahemiscyllium	Gen. et sp. nov	Valid	Guinot, Cappetta & Adnet	Early Cretaceous (Valanginian)		France	A carpet shark of uncertain phylogenetic placement. The type species is Parahemiscyllium underwoodwardi.	
Parascylloides	Gen. et sp. nov	Valid	Thies, Vespermann & Solcher	Late Triassic (Rhaetian)		Germany; United Kingdom	A member of Synechodontiformes of uncertain phylogenetic placement. The type species is Parascylloides turnerae.	
Parasquatina zitteli	Sp. nov	Valid	Pollerspoeck & Beaury	Late Cretaceous (Maastrichtian)		Germany	An orectolobiform, a species of Parasquatina.	
Polyfaciodus	Gen. et sp. nov	Valid	Koot & Cuny in Koot et al.	Early Triassic (Induan to Olenekian)		Oman	A synechodontiform neoselachian shark of uncertain phylogenetic placement. The type species is Polyfaciodus pandus.	
Potamotrygon ucayalensis	Sp. nov	Valid	Adnet, Gismondi & Antoine	Middle Eocene	Yahuarango Formation	Peru	A river stingray, a species of Potamotrygon.	
Pseudorhina crocheti	Sp. nov	Valid	Guinot, Cappetta & Adnet	Early Cretaceous (Valanginian)		France	A relative of angel sharks, a species of Pseudorhina.	
Restesia	Gen. et comb. nov	Valid	Cook et al.	Late Cretaceous (Maastrichtian) and Cretaceous-Paleogene boundary	Bug Creek Anthills; Hell Creek Formation; Lance Formation	United States	A wobbegong, a new genus for "Squatirhina" americana Estes (1964).	
Rhombopterygia zaborskii	Sp. nov	Valid	Vullo & Courville	Late Cretaceous		Nigeria	A member of Rajiformes of uncertain phylogenetic placement, a species of Rhombopterygia.	
Safrodus	Gen. et sp. nov	Valid	Koot & Cuny in Koot et al.	Early Triassic (Olenekian)		Oman	A synechodontiform neoselachian shark of uncertain phylogenetic placement. The type species is Safrodus tozeri.	
Saltirius	Gen. et sp. nov	Valid	Cook et al.	Middle Eocene	Brian Head Formation	United States	A dasyatoid stingray. The type species is Saltirius utahensis.	
Scyliorhinus biformis	Sp. nov	Valid	Reinecke	Oligocene (early to middle Chattian)	Sülstorf Beds	Germany	A catshark, a species of Scyliorhinus.	
Scyliorhinus suelstorfensis	Sp. nov	Valid	Reinecke	Oligocene (early to middle Chattian)	Sülstorf Beds	Germany	A catshark, a species of Scyliorhinus.	
Squalicorax benguerirensis	Sp. nov	Valid	Cappetta, Adnet, Akkrim & Amalik	Lower Maastrichtian	Ganntour phosphate deposit	Morocco	An anacoracid shark, a species of Squalicorax.	
Squalicorax microserratus	Sp. nov	Valid	Cappetta, Adnet, Akkrim & Amalik	Lower Maastrichtian	Ganntour phosphate deposit	Morocco	An anacoracid shark, a species of Squalicorax.	
Synechodus seinstedtensis	Sp. nov	Valid	Thies, Vespermann & Solcher	Late Triassic (Rhaetian)		Germany	A member of Synechodontiformes belonging to the family Palaeospinacidae, a species of Synechodus.	
Thiesus	Gen. et sp. nov	Valid	Guinot, Cappetta & Adnet	Middle Jurassic? (Bathonian) to Early Cretaceous (Valanginian)		France; United Kingdom?	A catshark. The type species is Thiesus concavus from the Early Cretaceous (Valanginian) of France; genus might also contain a second, yet unnamed species from the Middle Jurassic (Bathonian) of the United Kingdom.	
Xenacanthus ragonhai	Sp. nov	Valid	Pauliv et al.	Permian (Wordian to Wuchiapingian)	Rio do Rasto Formation	Brazil	A xenacanthiform, a species of Xenacanthus.	

=== Newly named bony fishes ===
Name	Novelty	Status	Authors	Age	Unit	Location	Notes	Images
Aluterus shigensis	Sp. nov	Valid	Miyajima et al.	Middle Miocene	Bessho Formation	Japan	A filefish, a species of Aluterus.	
Aplodinotus santosi	Sp. nov	Valid	Aguilera & Schwarzhans in Aguilera et al.	Early Miocene	Pirabas Formation	Brazil	A member of Sciaenidae, a relative of the freshwater drum.	
Apricenaclupea	Gen. et sp. nov	Valid	Taverne	Late Cretaceous (Santonian)		Italy	A member of Clupeidae belonging to the subfamily Pellonulinae and the tribe Ehiravini. The type species is Apricenaclupea ridewoodi.	
Batrachoides confluentus	Sp. nov	Valid	Aguilera & Schwarzhans in Aguilera et al.	Early Miocene	Pirabas Formation	Brazil	A member of Batrachoididae, a species of Batrachoides.	
Batrachoides gracilentus	Sp. nov	Valid	Aguilera & Schwarzhans in Aguilera et al.	Early Miocene	Pirabas Formation	Brazil	A member of Batrachoididae, a species of Batrachoides.	
Bryconetes	Gen. et sp. nov	Valid	Weiss, L. R. Malabarba & M. C. Malabarba	Eocene-Oligocene	Entre-Córregos Formation	Brazil	A stem-characid. The type species is Bryconetes enigmaticus.	
Camerichthys	Gen. et sp. nov	Valid	Bermúdez-Rochas & Poyato-Ariza	Late Jurassic (Tithonian) or Early Cretaceous (Berriasian)	Matute Formation	Spain	A member of Semionotiformes of uncertain phylogenetic placement. The type species is Camerichthys lunae.	
Ceratodus carteri	Sp. nov	Valid	Main et al.	Late Cretaceous (Cenomanian to Santonian)	Eutaw Formation Woodbine Formation	United States	A lungfish, a species of Ceratodus.	
Ceratodus texanus	Sp. nov	Valid	Parris, Grandstaff & Banks	Early Cretaceous (Aptian or Albian)	Antlers Formation; Twin Mountains Formation	United States	A lungfish, a species of Ceratodus.	
Chauliodus testa	Sp. nov	Valid	Nazarkin	Neogene		Russia	A viperfish.	
Cladocyclus geddesi	Sp. nov	Valid	Berrell et al.	Early Cretaceous (late Albian)	Winton Formation	Australia	A cladocyclid, a species of Cladocyclus.	
Congophiopsis	Gen. et comb. nov	Valid	Taverne	Middle Jurassic	Stanleyville Formation, Songa Limestones	Democratic Republic of the Congo	A member of Halecomorphi belonging to the group Ionoscopiformes and the family Ophiopsidae. The type species is "Ophiopsis" lepersonnei de Saint-Seine (1950).	
Corusichthys	Gen. et sp. nov	Valid	Taverne & Capasso	Late Cretaceous (Cenomanian)		Lebanon	A coccodontid. Genus includes new species C. megacephalus.	
Dipnotuberculus bagirovi	Sp. nov	Valid	Krupina & Prisyazhnaya	Devonian (Givetian)		Russia	A dipnorhynchid lungfish, a species of Dipnotuberculus.	
Dobrogeria	Gen. et sp. nov	Valid	Cavin & Grădinaru	Early Triassic (late Olenekian)		Romania	A non-latimerioid coelacanth. The type species is Dobrogeria aegyssensis.	
Eoleiognathus	Gen. et comb. nov	Valid	Bannikov	Eocene (Ypresian)		Italy	A ponyfish; a new genus for "Pygaeus" dorsalis Agassiz (1838).	
Eosternoptyx	Gen. et sp. nov	Valid	Afsari et al.	Middle to Late Eocene	Pabdeh Formation	Iran	A marine hatchetfish. The type species is Eosternoptyx discoidalis.	
Equetulus	Gen. et sp. et comb. nov	Valid	Aguilera & Schwarzhans in Aguilera et al.	Miocene (Aquitanian to Serravallian)		Brazil; Trinidad and Tobago (Trinidad); United States; Venezuela	A member of Sciaenidae. The type species is Equetulus amazonensis; genus also contains E. davidandrewi (Nolf & Aguilera, 1998), "Pachypops" fitchi Schwarzhans (1993) and E. silverdalensis (Müller, 1999).	
Errachidia	Gen. et sp. nov	Valid	Murray & Wilson	Early Late Cretaceous	Akrabou Formation	Morocco	An acanthomorph related to Aipichthys. The type species is Errachidia pentaspinosa.	
Garganoclupea	Gen. et sp. nov	Valid	Taverne	Late Cretaceous (Santonian)		Italy	A member of Clupeiformes belonging to the group Clupeoidei. The type species is Garganoclupea svetovidovi.	
Gobius mustus	Sp. nov	Valid	Schwarzhans	Miocene (Serravallian)	Karaman Basin	Turkey	A goby, a species of Gobius.	
Gobius reichenbacherae	Sp. nov	Valid	Schwarzhans	Miocene (Serravallian)	Karaman Basin	Turkey	A goby, a species of Gobius.	
Gobius vandervoorti	Sp. nov	Valid	Schwarzhans	Miocene (Serravallian)	Karaman Basin	Turkey	A goby, a species of Gobius.	
Homalopagus	Gen. et sp. nov	Valid	Murray & Wilson	Early Late Cretaceous	Akrabou Formation	Morocco	An acanthomorph related to Aipichthys. The type species is Homalopagus multispinosus.	
Isanichthys lertboosi	Sp. nov	Valid	Deesri et al.	Probably Late Jurassic	Phu Kradung Formation	Thailand	A relative of gars, a species of Isanichthys.	
Jinjuichthys	Gen. et sp. nov	Valid	Kim et al.	Early Cretaceous	Jinju Formation	South Korea	An ichthyodectiform. The type species is Jinjuichthys cheongi.	
Joinvillichthys	Gen. et comb. et sp. nov	Valid	Taverne & Capasso	Late Cretaceous (late Cenomanian)		Lebanon	A gladiopycnodontid pycnodontiform. A new genus for "Coccodus" lindstroemi Davis (1890); genus also contains a new species Joinvillichthys kriweti.	
Kisanganichthys	Gen. et sp. nov	Valid	Taverne	Middle Jurassic	Stanleyville Formation, Songa Limestones	Democratic Republic of the Congo	A teleost belonging to the group Catervarioliformes and the family Catervariolidae. The type species is Kisanganichthys casieri.	
Knipowitschia suavis	Sp. nov	Valid	Schwarzhans	Miocene (Serravallian)	Karaman Basin	Turkey	A goby. Originally described as a species of Knipowitschia, but subsequently transferred to the genus Moldavigobius.	
Lessinia	Gen. et sp. nov	Valid	Bannikov & Zorzin	Eocene (Ypresian)		Italy	A snapper. The type species is Lessinia horrenda.	
Lethrinus anatolicus	Sp. nov	Valid	Schwarzhans	Miocene (Serravallian)	Karaman Basin	Turkey	A member of Lethrinidae, a species of Lethrinus.	
Lopholatilus ereborensis	Sp. nov	Valid	Carnevale & Godfrey	Middle Miocene (Langhian)	Calvert Formation	United States	A tilefish, a species of Lopholatilus.	
Magrebichthys	Gen. et sp. nov	Valid	Murray & Wilson	Early Late Cretaceous	Akrabou Formation	Morocco	An acanthomorph related to the beardfishes. The type species is Magrebichthys nelsoni.	
Mamulichthys	Gen. et sp. nov	Disputed	Minikh	Middle Permian (Urzhumian)		Russia	A discordichthyid actinopterygian. The type species is Mamulichthys ignotus. Argued by Bakaev, Bazhenov & Alalykin (2025) to be a junior synonym of Mutovinia stella.	
Maraldichthys	Gen. et sp. nov	Valid	Taverne & Capasso	Late Cretaceous (Cenomanian)		Lebanon	A gebrayelichthyid pycnodontiform. The type species is Maraldichthys verticalis.	
Mascarenichthys exilis	Sp. nov	Valid	Schwarzhans	Miocene (Serravallian)	Karaman Basin	Turkey	A viviparous brotula, a species of Mascarenichthys.	
Megamastax	Gen. et sp. nov	Valid	Choo et al.	Silurian (Ludfordian, ~423 mya)	Kuanti Formation	China	Originally described as a sarcopterygian, subsequently reinterpreted as a stem-osteichthyan. The type species is Megamastax amblyodus.	
Millerolepis	Gen. et sp. nov	Valid	Elliott	Carboniferous (Bashkirian)		United Kingdom	A haplolepid palaeonisciform. The type species is Millerolepis eleionomae.	
Nardonoides	Gen. et comb. nov	Valid	Mayrinck, Brito & Otero	Late Cretaceous (Campanian to Maastrichtian )		Italy	A stem-otophysan; a new genus for "Chanoides" chardoni .	
Natgeosocus	Gen. et sp. nov	Valid	Bannikov	Early Oligocene		Russia	A lampriform related to the genus Palaeocentrotus. The type species is Natgeosocus sorini.	
Ogilbia brasiliensis	Sp. nov	Valid	Aguilera & Schwarzhans in Aguilera et al.	Early Miocene	Pirabas Formation	Brazil	A viviparous brotula, a species of Ogilbia.	
Pacuarescarus	Gen. et sp. nov	Valid	Laurito et al.	Early Miocene	Rio Banano Formation	Costa Rica	A member of Scaridae. The type species is Pacuarescarus kussmauli.	
Pankowskichthys	Gen. et sp. nov	Valid	Taverne & Capasso	Late Cretaceous (late Cenomanian)		Lebanon	A gladiopycnodontid pycnodontiform. The type species is Pankowskichthys libanicus.	
Paracoccodus	Gen. nov	Valid	Taverne & Capasso	Late Cretaceous (Cenomanian)		Lebanon	A coccodontid. Genus includes new species P. woodwardi.	
Paraconger paraensis	Sp. nov	Valid	Aguilera & Schwarzhans in Aguilera et al.	Early Miocene	Pirabas Formation	Brazil	A member of Congridae, a species of Paraconger.	
Parahaplolepis alexandrae	Sp. nov	Valid	Elliott	Carboniferous (Bashkirian)		United Kingdom	A haplolepid palaeonisciform, a species of Parahaplolepis.	
Parahaplolepis elenae	Sp. nov	Valid	Elliott	Carboniferous (Bashkirian)		United Kingdom	A haplolepid palaeonisciform, a species of Parahaplolepis.	
Paucaichthys elamensis	Sp. nov	Valid	Přikryl & Bannikov	Oligocene		Iran	A pomfret, a species of Paucaichthys.	
Persephonichthys	Gen. et sp. nov	Valid	Pardo, Huttenlocker & Small	Early Permian	Eskridge Formation	United States	A lungfish. The type species is Persephonichthys chthonica.	
Pirskenius radoni	Sp. nov	Valid	Přikryl	Oligocene		Czech Republic	An eleotrid, a species of Pirskenius.	
Plagioscion travassosi	Sp. nov	Valid	Aguilera & Schwarzhans in Aguilera et al.	Early Miocene	Pirabas Formation	Brazil	A member of Sciaenidae, a species of Plagioscion.	
Planktophaga	Gen. et sp. nov	Valid	Böhme et al.	Late Middle to Late Eocene	Rhin Chua Formation	Vietnam	A member of Cyprinidae. The type species is Planktophaga minuta.	
Plesiopercichthys	Gen. et sp. nov	Valid	Agnolin et al.	Early Pliocene	Monte Hermoso Formation	Argentina	A temperate perch. The type species is Plesiopercichthys dimartinoi.	
Pomatoschistus rueckertae	Sp. nov	Valid	Schwarzhans	Miocene (Serravallian)	Karaman Basin	Turkey	A goby, a species of Pomatoschistus.	
Porichthys atalaianus	Sp. nov	Valid	Aguilera & Schwarzhans in Aguilera et al.	Early Miocene	Pirabas Formation	Brazil	A midshipman fish.	
Propercarina problematica	Sp. nov	Valid	Přikryl et al.	Oligocene		Poland; Romania	A member of Stromateoidei, a species of Propercarina.	
Protohaplolepis isabellae	Sp. nov	Valid	Elliott	Carboniferous (Bashkirian)		United Kingdom	A haplolepid palaeonisciform, a species of Protohaplolepis.	
Protohaplolepis limnades	Sp. nov	Valid	Elliott	Carboniferous (Bashkirian)		United Kingdom	A haplolepid palaeonisciform, a species of Protohaplolepis.	
Protohaplolepis traquairi	Sp. nov	Valid	Elliott	Carboniferous (Bashkirian)		United Kingdom	A haplolepid palaeonisciform, a species of Protohaplolepis.	
Protolarimus	Gen. et comb. et sp. nov	Valid	Aguilera & Schwarzhans in Aguilera et al.	Miocene		Brazil; Venezuela	A member of Sciaenidae. A new genus for "Larimus" henrici Nolf & Aguilera (1998); genus also contains new species Protolarimus mauryae, as well as "Ophioscion" lundbergi Aguilera & Rodrigues de Aguilera (2004).	
Protosciaena brasiliensis	Sp. nov	Valid	Aguilera & Schwarzhans in Aguilera et al.	Early Miocene	Pirabas Formation	Brazil	A member of Sciaenidae, a species of Protosciaena.	
Pteronisculus nielseni	Sp. nov	Valid	Xu, Shen & Zhao	Middle Triassic (Anisian)	Guanling Formation	China	A stem-actinopteran, a species of Pteronisculus.	
Pyritocephalus youngii	Sp. nov	Valid	Elliott	Carboniferous (Bashkirian)		United Kingdom	A haplolepid palaeonisciform, a species of Pyritocephalus.	
Pythonichthys pirabasensis	Sp. nov	Valid	Aguilera & Schwarzhans in Aguilera et al.	Early Miocene	Pirabas Formation	Brazil	A member of Heterenchelyidae, a species of Pythonichthys.	
Ranulfoichthys	Gen. et sp. nov	Valid	Alvarado-Ortega	Early Cretaceous (Albian)		Mexico	A basal member of Clupeomorpha. The type species is Ranulfoichthys dorsonudum.	
Robustichthys	Gen. et sp. nov	Valid	Xu, Zhao & Coates	Middle Triassic (Anisian)		China	A ray-finned fish of uncertain phylogenetic placement; might be an ionoscopiform halecomorph (a relative of the bowfin) or a member of the stem group of Ginglymodi. The type species is Robustichthys luopingensis.	
Rutilus robustus	Sp. nov	Valid	Kovalchuk	Late Miocene to Pliocene		Moldova; Ukraine	A member of Cyprinidae, a species of Rutilus.	
Sangiorgioichthys yangjuanensis	Sp. nov	Valid	Chen et al.	Middle Triassic (Anisian)	Guanling Formation	China	Originally described as a member of Semionotiformes and a species of Sangiorgioichthys; Xu et al. (2019) transferred this species to the group Kyphosichthyiformes and to the genus Lashanichthys.	
Sanopus mendax	Sp. nov	Valid	Aguilera & Schwarzhans in Aguilera et al.	Early Miocene	Pirabas Formation	Brazil	A member of Batrachoididae, a species of Sanopus.	
Sanopus peregrinus	Sp. nov	Valid	Aguilera & Schwarzhans in Aguilera et al.	Early Miocene	Pirabas Formation	Brazil	A member of Batrachoididae, a species of Sanopus.	
Saurichthys hoffmanni	Sp. nov	Valid	Werneburg, Kogan & Sell	Middle Triassic (Anisian)	Röt Formation	Germany	A species of Saurichthys.	
Saurichthys majiashanensis	Sp. nov	Valid	Tintori et al.	Early Triassic (Olenekian)	Nanlinghu Formation	China	A species of Saurichthys.	
Saurichthys minimahleri	Sp. nov	Valid	Werneburg, Kogan & Sell	Middle Triassic (Anisian)	Röt Formation	Germany	A species of Saurichthys.	
Scardinius ponticus	Sp. nov	Valid	Kovalchuk	Miocene (late Turolian)		Ukraine	A member of Cyprinidae, a species of Scardinius.	
Sciaenops rossettiae	Sp. nov	Valid	Aguilera & Schwarzhans in Aguilera et al.	Early Miocene	Pirabas Formation	Brazil	A member of Sciaenidae. Originally described as a species of Sciaenops; subsequently made the type species of a separate genus Amazonasciaena by Aguilera, Schwarzhans & Béarez (2016).	
Scorpaena? landaui	Sp. nov	Valid	Schwarzhans	Miocene (Serravallian)	Karaman Basin	Turkey	A scorpionfish, possibly a species of Scorpaena.	
Serranus? ariejansseni	Sp. nov	Valid	Schwarzhans	Miocene (Serravallian)	Karaman Basin	Turkey	A member of Serranidae, possibly a species of Serranus.	
Sinamia kukurihime	Sp. nov	Valid	Yabumoto	Early Cretaceous	Kuwajima Formation	Japan	A sinamiid amiiform, a species of Sinamia.	
Sorbinichromis	Gen. et sp. nov	Valid	Bannikov & Bellwood	Eocene (Ypresian)		Italy	A member of Pomacentridae. The type species is Sorbinichromis francescoi.	
Spicara pamphyliensis	Sp. nov	Valid	Schwarzhans	Miocene (Serravallian)	Karaman Basin	Turkey	A member of Centracanthidae, a species of Spicara.	
Syacium predorsalis	Sp. nov	Valid	Aguilera & Schwarzhans in Aguilera et al.	Early Miocene	Pirabas Formation	Brazil	A member of Paralichthyidae, a species of Syacium.	
Thalassophryne aequaliter	Sp. nov	Valid	Aguilera & Schwarzhans in Aguilera et al.	Early Miocene	Pirabas Formation	Brazil	A member of Batrachoididae, a species of Thalassophryne.	
Thalassophryne pumilus	Sp. nov	Valid	Aguilera & Schwarzhans in Aguilera et al.	Early Miocene	Pirabas Formation	Brazil	A member of Batrachoididae, a species of Thalassophryne.	
Thorogobius iucundus	Sp. nov	Valid	Schwarzhans	Miocene (Langhian to Serravallian)	Karaman Basin	Austria; Czech Republic; Poland; Slovakia; Turkey	A goby, a species of Thorogobius.	
Wallago maemohensis	Sp. nov	Valid	Roberts	Miocene		Thailand	A silurid catfish, a species of Wallago.	
Xenotolithus retrolobatus	Sp. nov	Valid	Aguilera & Schwarzhans in Aguilera et al.	Early Miocene	Pirabas Formation	Brazil	A member of Sciaenidae, a species of Xenotolithus.	
Zappaichthys	Gen. et sp. nov	Valid	Carnevale & Collette	Middle Miocene (late Badenian)	Leitha Limestone	Austria	A batrachoidid toadfish. The type species is Zappaichthys harzhauseri.	
