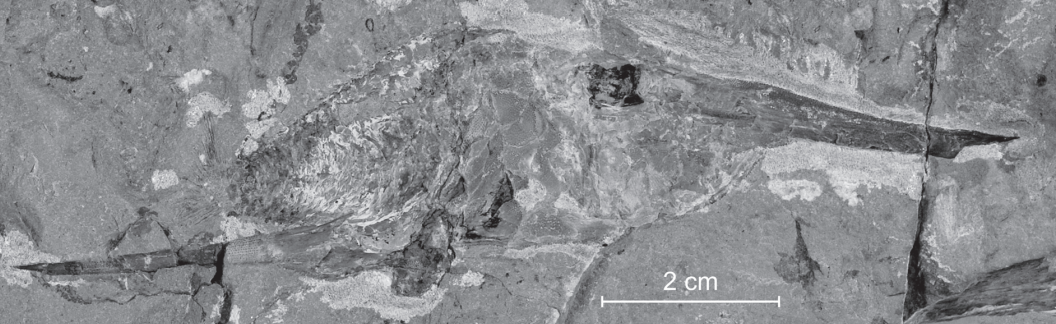
- The holotype of Gladiopycnodus karami

Scientific classification
- Kingdom: Animalia
- Phylum: Chordata
- Class: Actinopterygii
- Order: †Pycnodontiformes
- Family: †Gladiopycnodontidae
- Genus: †Gladiopycnodus; Taverne & Capasso, 2013

Type species
- Gladiopycnodus karami Taverne & Capasso, 2013

Other species
- †Gladiopycnodus byrnei Marramà et al., 2016

= Gladiopycnodus =

Gladiopycnodus Temporal range: Late Cenomanian ~95–93.5 Ma

Genus of extinct bony fish

Gladiopycnodus is an extinct genus of pycnodont fish from what is now Lebanon. Fossils of the genus have been found at the Haqel and Hjoula localities of the Sannine Formation, both of which have been dated to the late Cenomanian. One of the more notable features distinguishing the fish from other members of Gladiopycnodidae is the two pairs of large backwards-pointing spines on the ventral area of the fish. These spines are made from scales, often referred to as ventral scutes, and are extremely large compared to other pycnodonts. The larger of the two being positioned near the pelvic fin pointing backwards and spanning past the caudal fin. Gladiopycnodus has been suggested to have had demersal ecology though it has also been suggested that the animal could have had a niche similar to the modern snipefish and bellowsfish. These fish would have lived in a warm marine ecosystem throughout a continental shelf. Throughout this shelf, small but deep basins would have been present with them being surrounded by rudist reefs. There are two species currently recognized: G. karami and G. byrnei.

== History and classification ==
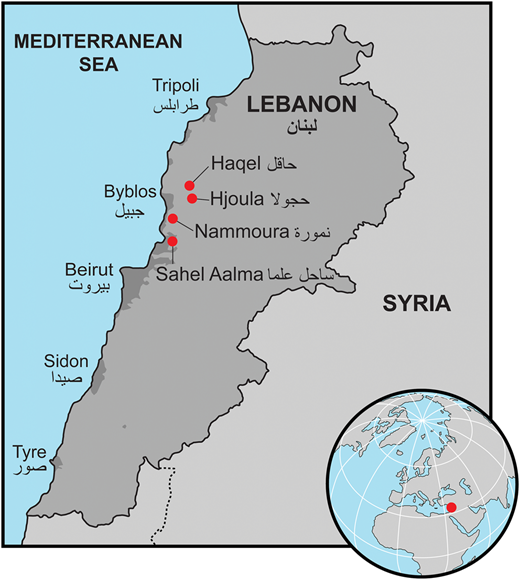
A map of Lebanon showing the locations of sites. The genus was found at the points labeled Haqel and Hjoula.

The type species of Gladiopycnodus, G. karami, was described by Louis Taverne and Luigi Capasso in 2013 based on a single specimen (CLC S-393) that was a part of the Luigi Capasso collection. Three other specimens of the species are known from private collections, which were able to show anatomical features not well preserved in the holotype. The holotype was originally collected from Lebanon at the Haqel locality of the Sannine Formation, a formation known for its diverse assemblage of bony fish which includes a very large number of other pycnodont genera. A second species, G. byrnei, would later be named in 2016 by Giuseppe Marramà et al. based on single specimen (MGPTPU130335) also found within the Sannine Formation, although at a different site, the Hjoula locality. Along with the description of the new species, this publication would also reinterpret certain features of the genus' anatomy.

The name Gladiopycnodus derives from the Latin word "gladius" which translates to sword, in reference to shape of the fin spines of the pectoral and anal fins, along with the word "pycnodus" which is a common suffix for pycnodonts. The species name of the type genus "karami" is named after Youssef Bey Karam, a hero in the history of Lebanon that lead the rebellion against the Ottoman Empire during the late 1860s. The species name of the second species on the other hand "byrnei" is named after the American musician and composer David Byrne.

=== Classification ===
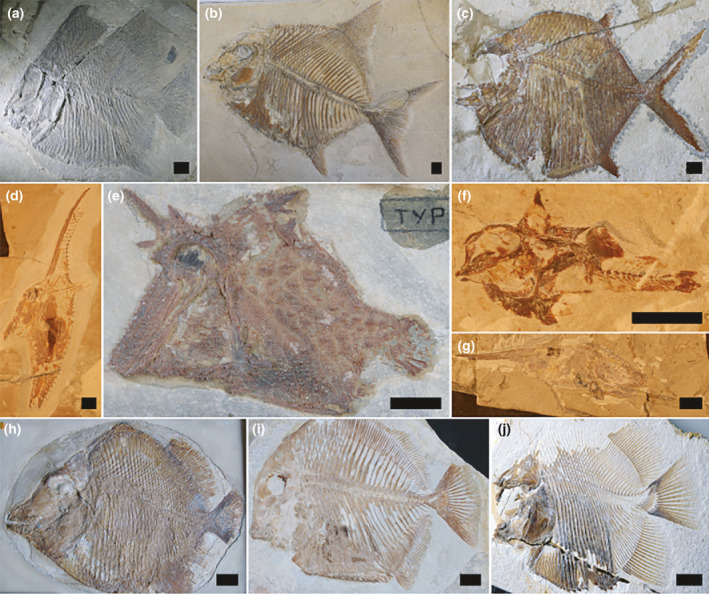
A selection of pycnodonts, including Gladiopycnodus karami (g)

Gladiopycnodus is the type genus of the family Gladiopycnodidae, which was described in the same publication as the genus. Fish in this family have long rostrums that are formed by the prefrontal bones, and which are much longer than the lower jaw. Though the loss of pectoral fins was initially thought to be a trait shared by all members of the family, Gladiopycnodus byrnei is an exception to this. This family is placed within the superfamily Coccodontoidea, another group named in the publication, which are a group of what have been referred to as armored pycnodonts. These fish, like some other more derived pycnodonts, have a reduced operculum with a much larger preoperculum. Along with this, members of the family have been considered to have what has been compared to a cephalothorax, due to fusion between the pectoral girdle and skull elements. Like in Gladiopycnodidae, small fins are seen in all members of the Cocodontoidea. Due to a number of unknown characters in comparison to other groups of pycnodonts, the family is generally not included in phylogenic trees of the order. The family Coccodontidae, however, has been included with it being considered an early branch of Pycnodontoidea in a 2002 paper by Francisco José Poyato-Ariza and Sylvie Wenz.

Within the family itself, Gladiopycnodus, is considered to be a more derived member of the family with it being placed near other similar members of the family such as Stenoprotome and Rostropycnodus. This placement is based on the 2015 publication by Taverne and Capasso which used a total of 88 characters from both previous publications by the authors along with the description of the second species of Gladiopycnodus by Marramà et al. Below is the phylogenic tree from this publication.

- Coccodontoidea
  - Coccodontidae
  - - Gebrayelichthyidae
    - Gladiopycnodidae
      - Monocerichthys
      - - - Joinvillichthys lindstroemi
          - Joinvillichthys kriweti
        - - Pankowskichthys
          - - Ducrotayichthys
            - - Tricerichthys
              - - Ichthyoceros
                - - Hayolperichthys
                  - - Rostropycnodus
                    - - - Gladiopycnodus karami
                        - Gladiopycnodus byrnei
                      - - Stenoprotome

== Description ==
=== Skull and pectoral girdle ===
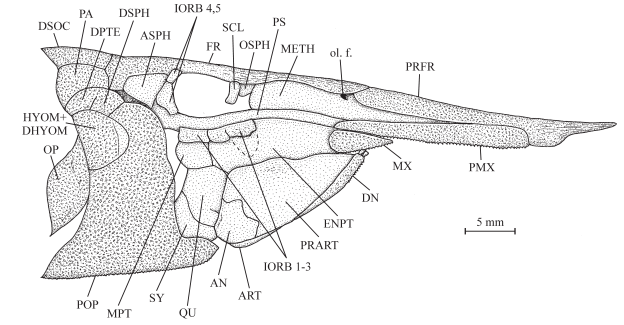
The skull of Gladiopycnodus karami based on the holotype

Gladiopycnodus was a small fish with neither species having a length of over 13 centimetres (5.1 in). The most noticeable feature of the skull of the genus is the presence of a very long, sword-shaped rostrum that made up at least half of the skull length. This rostrum is only made up of the prefrontal, mesethmoid, parasphenoid, and premaxillae bones along with potentially the vomer. The prefrontal is the only one of these bones that forms the tip of the rostrum. The toothless premaxilla, similar to the prefrontal, was very long and broad and would have been connected to the underside of the prefrontal with the suture. The lower jaw is much shorter that the upper jaw though is much deeper and triangular in shape and processes two incisiform prehensile teeth on the dentary along with molariform teeth on the prearticular bone. This jaw is in articulation with the quadrate and symplectic bones with the quadrate being overall strange for the group due to the fact that the bone lacks a ossified quadratic process. The skull roof of the fish is made up of a number of bones including the frontals which are long and trapezoid-shaped in the genus. One difference between the two species is the presence of partial fusion in the skull of G. byrnei, which is in contrast to the type species in which these bones are unfused.

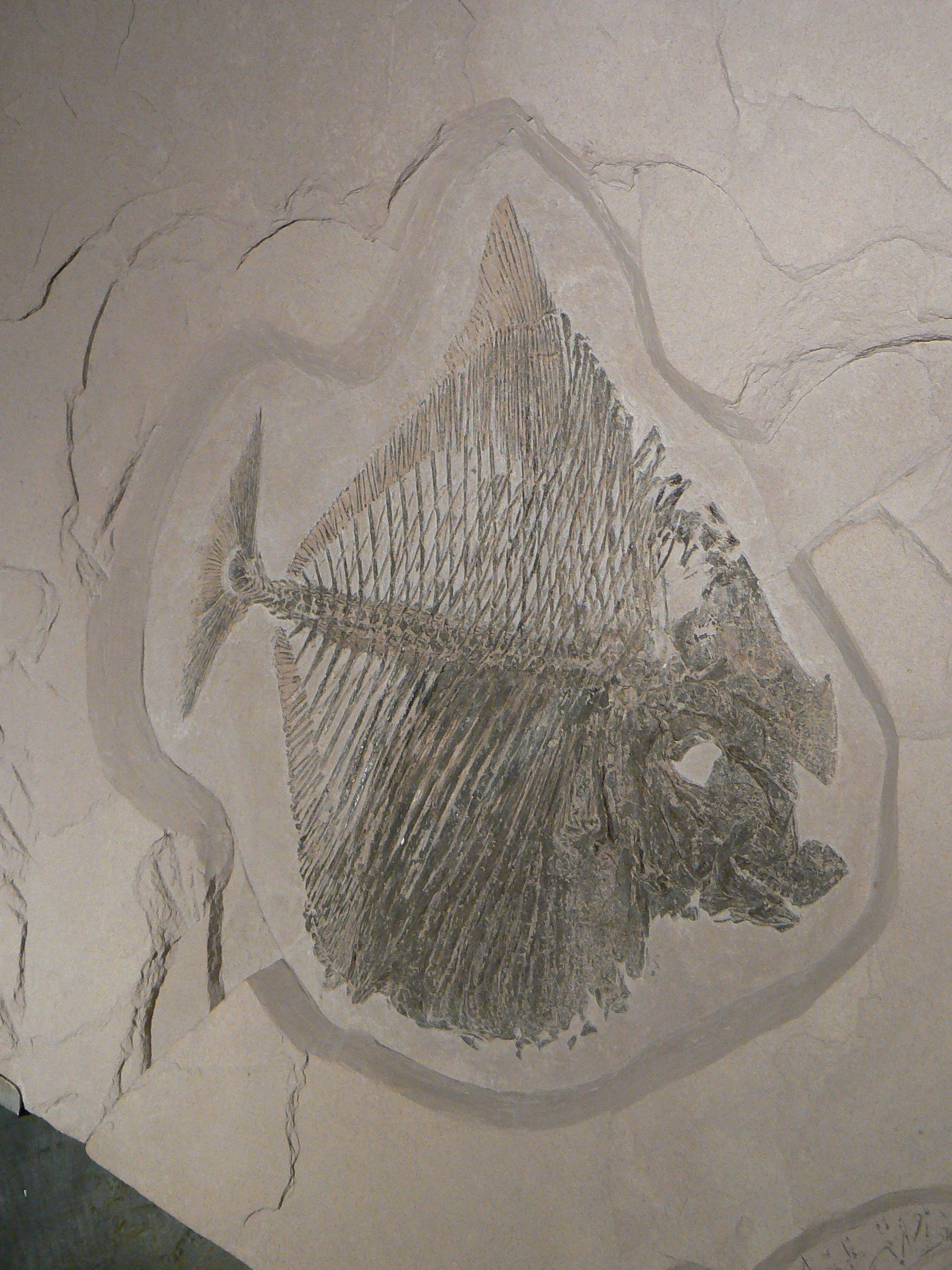
A fossil of Paranursallia, a pycnodont with a more traditional body form and arrangement of ventral scutes. They can be seen covering the underside of the anterior half of the skeleton.

Unlike a number of other fish, the opercular region is only made up of the opercle and preopercle with the former being much smaller than the latter. The preopercles are the largest bones in the skull with them reaching the underside of the head. One of the stranger parts of the anatomy of the fish comes in the form of the pectoral girdle being fused to the skull, with this being referred to as something similar to a cephalothorax. In the original description of the type species, it was stated that the pectoral fins were replaced by a large spine. However, fin rays of the pectoral fins were found in the description of the second species which suggests that the fin rays were just not preserved in specimens of G. karami. A response was then made in a 2015 publication by Taverne and Capasso which put forward that the type species most likely lacked the pectoral fins due to the shape of cleithrum. In contrast to other members of the family such as Monocerichthys, Gladiopycnodus lacked a large horn at the back of the skull. A number of bones that make up of the skeleton are ornamented with small tubercles with the ones in regions such as the skull and pectoral girdle being larger than those on other parts of the body.

=== Postcranium ===
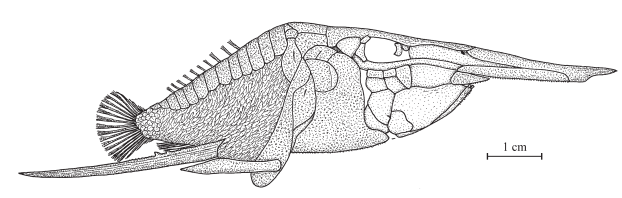
Reconstruction of the holotype of Gladiopycnodus karami

The body of Gladiopycnodus was generally fusiform with the maximum depth of the body only being about 1/4 of the standard length, this being towards the front of the body. Though most of the vertebrae are covered by scales in most specimens of the genus, one specimen of G. karami shows that the haemal and neural spines of the fish were short but well-developed, possessing a wing at the front of the spine. All fins on the body of the fish have short fin rays and are generally small. The dorsal fin is located at the back half of the body and is made up of between 10 and 14 fin rays depending on the species. The anal and pelvic fins on the other hand are not well described due to them being covered by two large scutes referred to as the anal and pelvic plates. Similar to the rostrum of the fish, the anal plate has been described as being sword-like with it pointing posteriorly and spanning well past the caudal fin of the fish. The spine, like the skull, is ornamented with small tubercles with them merging into ridges towards the back of the body. The pelvic region also possesses a plate though this plate is much smaller than the anal plate and is positioned right in front of it. The origin of these plates is the result of a reduction of ventral scutes, which are a common feature of pycnodonts. Similar to the pelvic fins, the pelvic girdle is also largely covered by the large plates, though it is slightly visible in one specimen of the type species. The caudal fin of Gladiopycnodus is small and symmetrical with a slightly convex posterior edge. The body of the fish is covered with small rhomboid scales that overlap one another and are covered in tubercles. Between the extrascapulars and the tail, the upper half of the body is covered in large paired dorsal scutes.

=== Species ===
Species	Age	Location	Localities	Notes
G. byrnei	Late Cenomanian	Lebanon	Hjoula Locality (Sannine Formation)	Species with a total length of 127 millimetres (5.0 in) including the anal plates. The rostrum is longer than in the type species with it making up about 46% of the body length. The skull roof has partially fused dermosupraoccipital, frontal, and parietal bones. The opercule is more elongate than in the type species. The dorsal is made up of 14 fin rays and the caudal fin is made up of 24 rays. It is unknown if the amount of dorsal scutes differs between individuals similar to the type species but the only known specimen has 14 rows. There is no rounded caudal scale on top of the caudal peduncle. A pectoral fin is present in the species. Pectoral fin rays are present in the species with the cleithrum with an enlarged posterior process.
G. karami	Late Cenomanian	Lebanon	Haqel Locality (Sannine Formation)	Type species with a total length of 117 millimetres (4.6 in) including the anal plates. The rostrum is shorter than the other species with it making up about 32% of the body length. The skull roof lacks any fusion in the bones and the opercule is less elongate, instead having an ovoid shape. The dorsal fin is made up of 14 fin rays and the caudal fin is made up of 17 rays. The number of dorsal scutes differ between specimens with the holotype having 13 pairs while another specimen has 12. There is a rounded caudal scale on top of the caudal peduncle. Pectoral fin rays are not present in the species with the cleithrum being rod-shaped without processes usually seen in the family.

== Paleobiology ==
=== Paleoecology ===
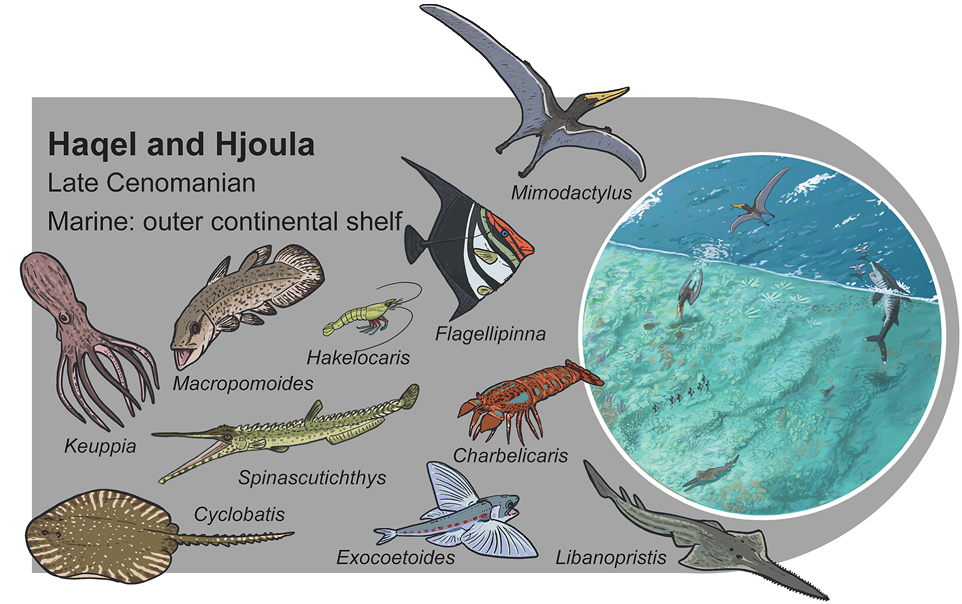
A figure showing the depositional environment along with some of the fauna within the Haqel and Hjoula localities in Lebanon

Suggestions of the ecology of Gladiopycnodus, similar to its presence in the literature, is lacking with the main publication on this topic being the 2018 paper by Giuseppe Marramà et al. that described the second species of the genus. They generally consider the morphology of the fish to not have any direct comparisons, but they do bring up an example of a group of fish that both have armor and an elongate rostrum. They suggest that Gladiopycnodus could have been similar in behavior to modern members of Centriscidae, a family containing snipefish and bellowsfish. These fish spend their time feeding on zooplankton and small benthic organisms while swimming vertically with their snouts pointed downwards. Similar to these fish and a number of other animals with spines, they suggest that they were for protection against predators. Another suggestion would come from a 2018 paper by Luigi Capasso which made comparisons between these modified scales and the modified scales used for similar purposes in members of Acanthuridae. This would be in line with a general response towards increasing marine predation referred to as the Mesozoic Marine Revolution. A later publication by John J. Cawley et al. in 2021 would mention the genus as a part of a review of pycnodont diversity, instead suggesting a more demersal ecology for the fish.

=== Paleoenvironment ===
Both species within the genus were found within the sediment of the Sannine Formation. During this time, the region where these fish would have lived would have been on the African Platform in northern Gondwana. The currently understood paleoenvironment attributed to the Haqel locality is that of a collection of small, deep basins that would have been placed between rudist patch reefs with some taxa, such as Flagellipinna, being suggested to have lived on the slopes of the basins, only to fall down to the anoxic bottom after the animal died. Though the exact reason for this is poorly understood, fish at the site are commonly found in mass mortality slabs with these potentially being restricted to certain horizons. Due to this, it has been suggested that the origin of these assemblages could have came from nutrient upwellings or algal blooms. The fauna found at the site is largely made up of small fish but a number of large fish, invertebrates, tetrapods, algae, and terrestrial plants are also found at Haqel. In contrast to this, the fauna that makes up the Hjoula locality has a larger amount of crustaceans and insects and less fish than Haqel. Though the environments would have been close to one another, some differences in the lithology have been noted suggesting a different paleoenvironment. Multiple options for the paleoenvironment have come up in the past, with some authors suggesting that Hjoula could represent a more active marine slope ecosystem that would have been surrounded by rudist and oyster reefs with other authors also suggesting that Hjoula could have been further from the shore than Haqel. The family that Gladiopycnodus belongs to along with the two other families Coccodontidae and Gebrayelichthyidae are currently understood to be endemic to this region during the time. This extreme amount of diversity has been suggested to have come from a mix of warmer temperatures and the rise of sea levels in the region.
