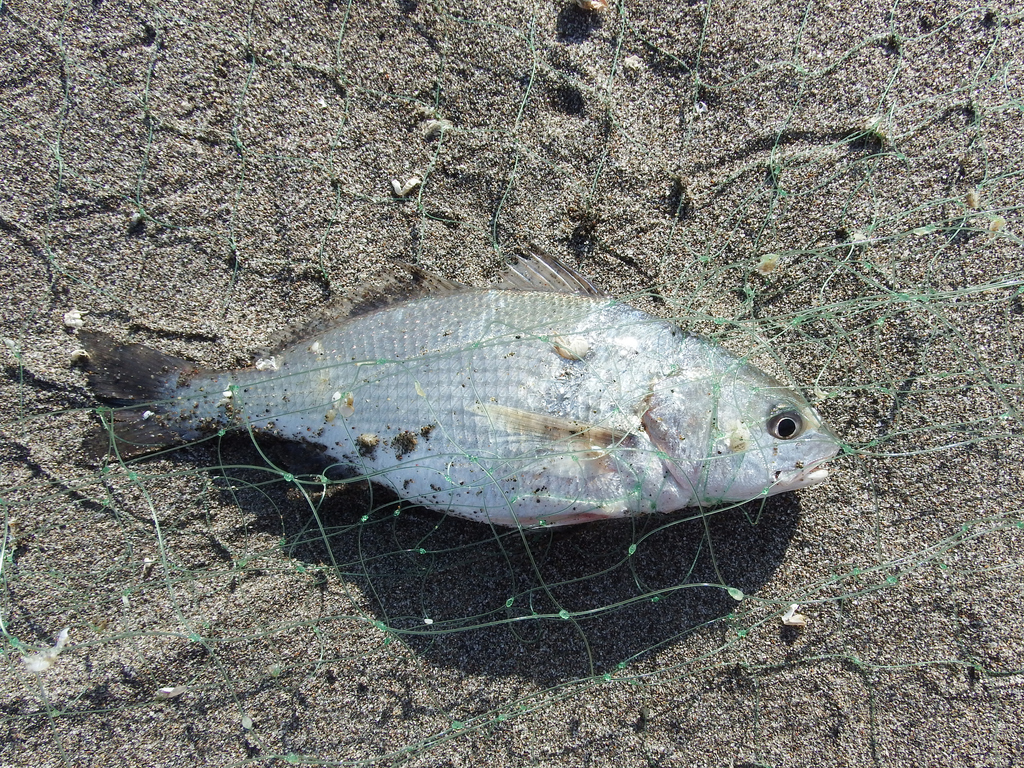

Conservation status
- Least Concern (IUCN 3.1)

Scientific classification
- Kingdom: Animalia
- Phylum: Chordata
- Class: Actinopterygii
- Order: Acanthuriformes
- Family: Sciaenidae
- Genus: Callaus
- Species: C. deliciosa

Binomial name
- Callaus deliciosa (Tschudi, 1846)

Synonyms
- Corvina deliciosa Tschudi, 1846; Sciaena deliciosa (Tschudi, 1846); Umbrina imberbis Günther, 1873; Sciaena suavis de Buen, 1961

= Lorna drum =

Species of ray-finned fish

The Lorna drum (Callaus deliciosa) is a species of marine ray-finned fish belonging to the family Sciaenidae, the drums and croakers. This species is found in the eastern Pacific Ocean where it is found from Ecuador to Chile. It is some times placed in the genus Sciaena.
