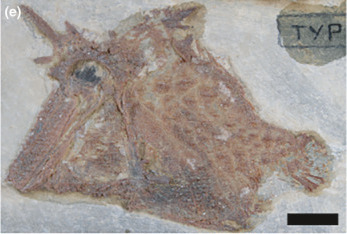
- Specimen of I. spinosus

Scientific classification
- Kingdom: Animalia
- Phylum: Chordata
- Class: Actinopterygii
- Order: †Pycnodontiformes
- Family: †Gladiopycnodontidae
- Genus: †Ichthyoceros; Gayet, 1984
- Species: †I. spinosus

Binomial name
- †Ichthyoceros spinosus Gayet, 1984

= Ichthyoceros =

Ichthyoceros Temporal range: Lower Cenomanian

Extinct genus of fishes

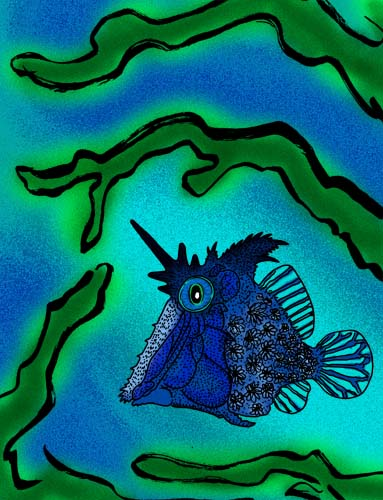
Life restoration of I. spinosus

Ichthyoceros is an extinct pycnodontid from the Late Cretaceous. It contains a single species, I. spinosus, from the Cenomanian-aged Sannine Formation of Lebanon. I. spinosus had a triple, forward-pointing horn-like spine between its eyes, very similar to the single spine of Trewavasia, and a massive, multipointed spine emanating from the back of its head. It was originally placed in the family Coccodontidae, but then was transferred to "Trewavasiidae" with Trewavasia. Recently, it has been placed in Gladiopycnodontidae due to recent anatomical similarities with the various genera within that family, including Gladiopycnodus.

== See also ==
- Prehistoric fish
- List of prehistoric bony fish
- Trewavasia, its close relative
