= Ctenopomichthys =

Ctenopomichthys Temporal range: Langhian

Scientific classification
- Domain: Eukaryota
- Kingdom: Animalia
- Phylum: Chordata
- Class: Actinopterygii
- Order: Scorpaeniformes
- Genus: †Ctenopomichthys; Whitley, 1940
- Species: †C. jemelka

Binomial name
- †Ctenopomichthys jemelka (Heckel, 1856)

Synonyms
- Ctenopoma jemelka Heckel, 1856 (preocc.); Jemelkia White & Moy-Thomas, 1940

Extinct genus of fishes

Ctenopomichthys is an extinct genus of marine scorpaeniform fish that inhabited the Paratethys Sea during the Miocene. It contains a single species, C. jemelka from the middle Miocene-aged Leitha Limestone of Saint Margarethen, Austria (sometimes given as Sopron, Hungary).

It was initially named without description in 1849 by Johann Jakob Heckel as Pygaeus jemelka, before being officially described as Ctenopoma jemelka in 1856. However, Ctenopoma was found to be preoccupied by an unrelated genus of freshwater fish (Ctenopoma), and the species was thus reclassfied into two different genera (Ctenopomichthys Whitley, 1940 and Jemelkia White & Moy-Thomas, 1940), with Ctenopomichthys being published just a month before Jemelkia.

It was formerly placed in the Scorpaenidae, but later studies have found it to lack distinguishing features of this family.

== See also ==
- Prehistoric fish
- List of prehistoric bony fish
