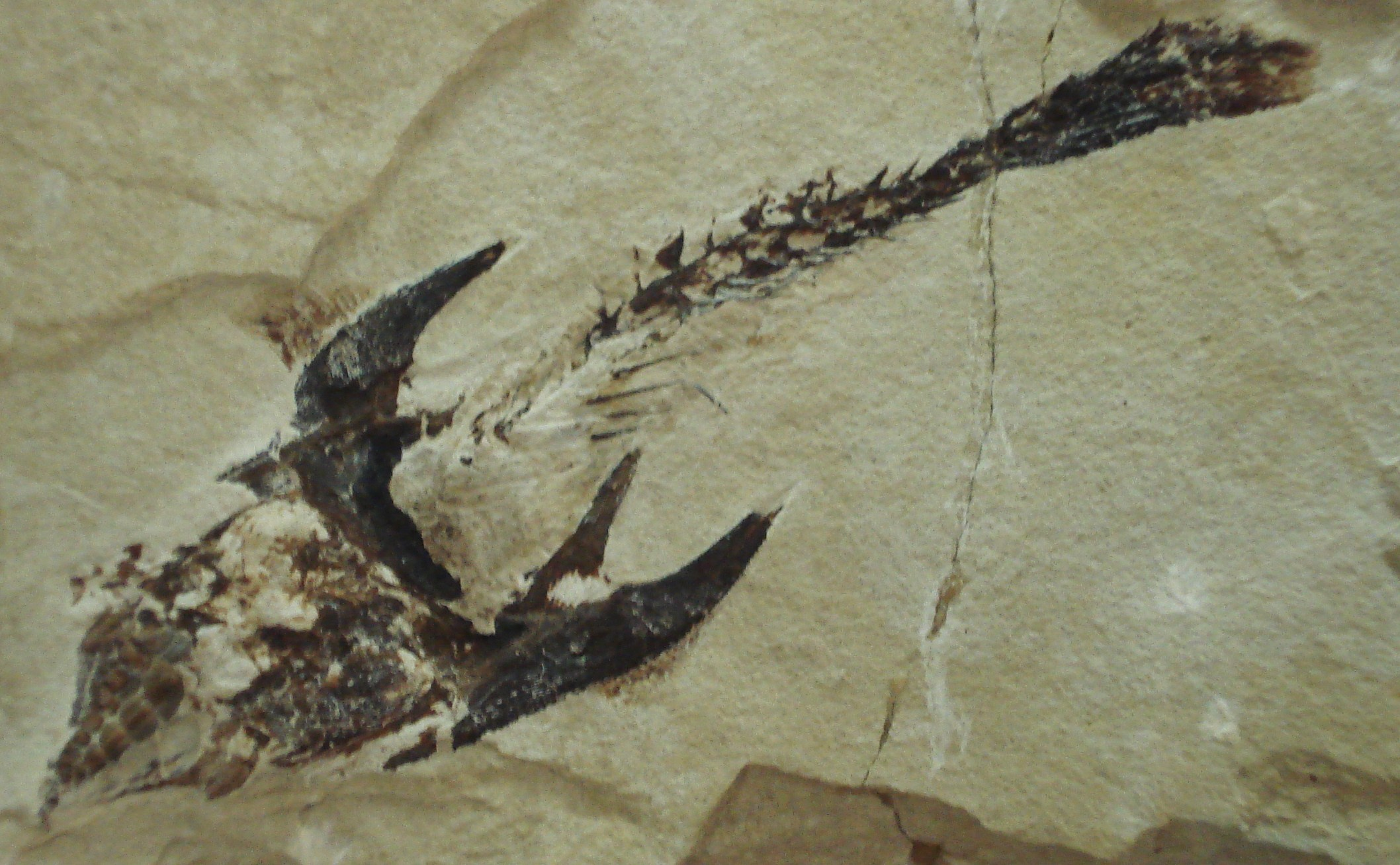
- Coccodus insignis

Scientific classification
- Domain: Eukaryota
- Kingdom: Animalia
- Phylum: Chordata
- Class: Actinopterygii
- Order: †Pycnodontiformes
- Family: †Coccodontidae
- Genus: †Coccodus; Pictet, 1850

Species
- †C. armatus Pictet, 1850; †C. insignis Hay, 1903

= Coccodus =

Coccodus Temporal range: Upper Cenomanian

Extinct genus of fishes

Coccodus is an extinct genus of marine pycnodontid fish that lived during the Late Cretaceous. The various species had a pair of massive, curved spines emanating from the lower sides of the head, and one curved spine on the top of its head. Unlike most pycnodontids (which tend to have short, marine butterflyfish-like bodies), Coccodus species had a comparatively long body, giving the living animals a superficial resemblance to a scaly chimaera.

Coccodus is closely related to the similarly spined genera Trewavasia, Corusichthys, Paracoccodus, and Hensodon, which also lived during the Cenomanian of Lebanon.

== Taxonomy ==
Two species are known, both from the Cenomanian-aged Sannine Formation of Lebanon:

- †C. armatus Pictet, 1850 - Hakel locality of Sannine Formation
- †C. insignis Hay, 1903 - Hjoula locality of Sannine Formation

The species Coccodus lindstroemi was recently determined to be a species complex, and various specimens assigned to C. lindstroemi were redescribed as species of the gladiopycnodontid genus Joinivillichthys

== See also ==
- Prehistoric fish
- List of prehistoric bony fish
