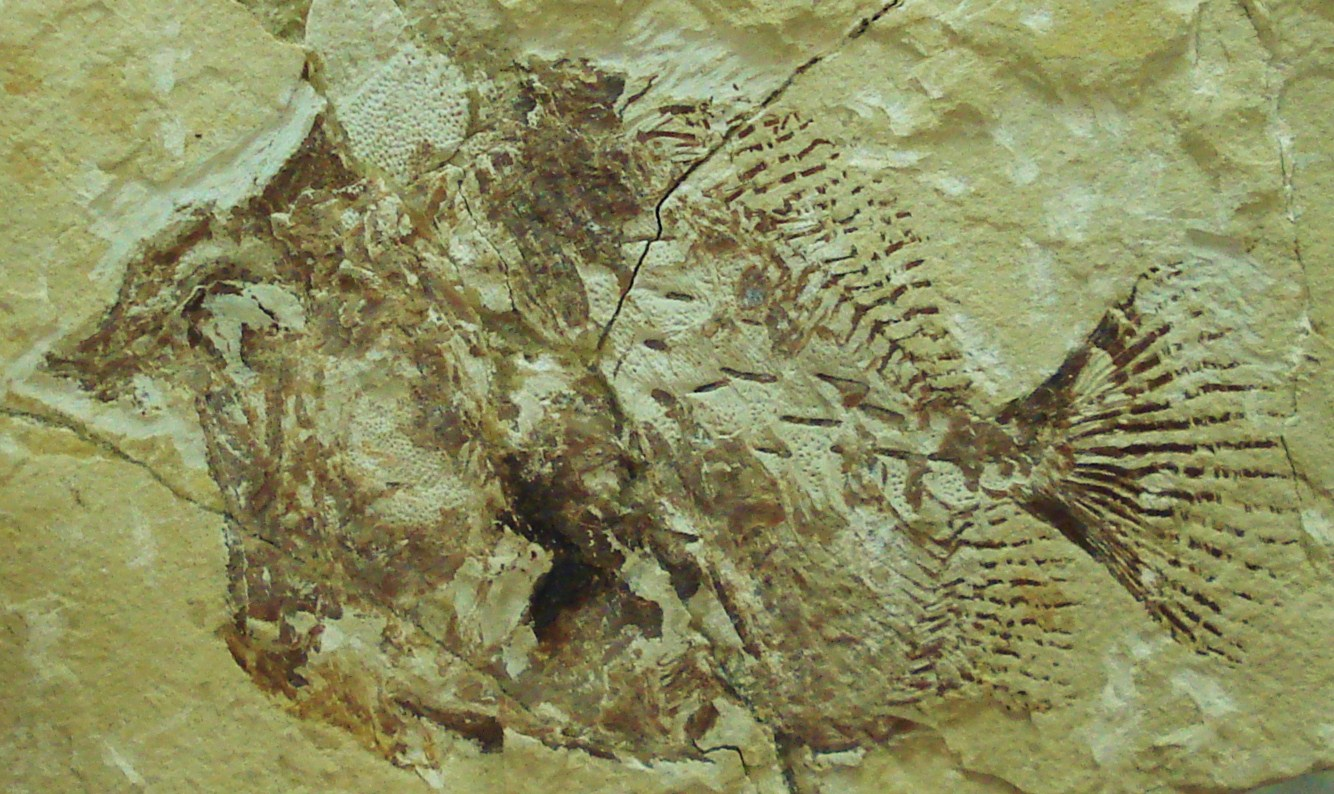
- fossil of T. carinata

Scientific classification
- Kingdom: Animalia
- Phylum: Chordata
- Class: Actinopterygii
- Order: †Pycnodontiformes
- Family: †Coccodontidae
- Genus: †Trewavasia; White & Moy-Thomas, 1941
- Species: †T. carinata

Binomial name
- †Trewavasia carinata (Davis, 1887)

= Trewavasia =

Trewavasia Temporal range: Lower Cenomanian

Extinct genus of fishes

Trewavasia carinata is an extinct pycnodontid fish in the family Coccodontidae that lived during the lower Cenomanian of what is now Lebanon. It had a large, forward-pointing horn-like spine between its eyes, and a massive stump-like spine emanating from the back of its head. T. carinata is closely related the genera Corusichthys and Hensodon, as well as Coccodus. It is named after Ethelwynn Trewavas.

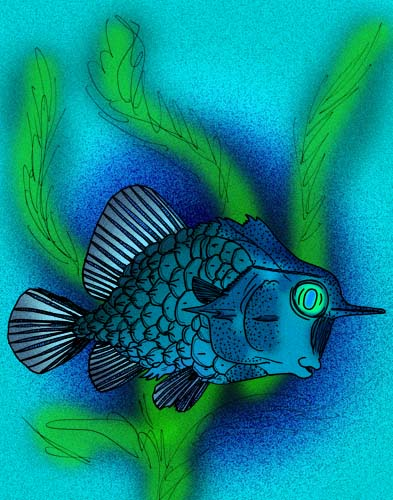
Artist's reconstruction
