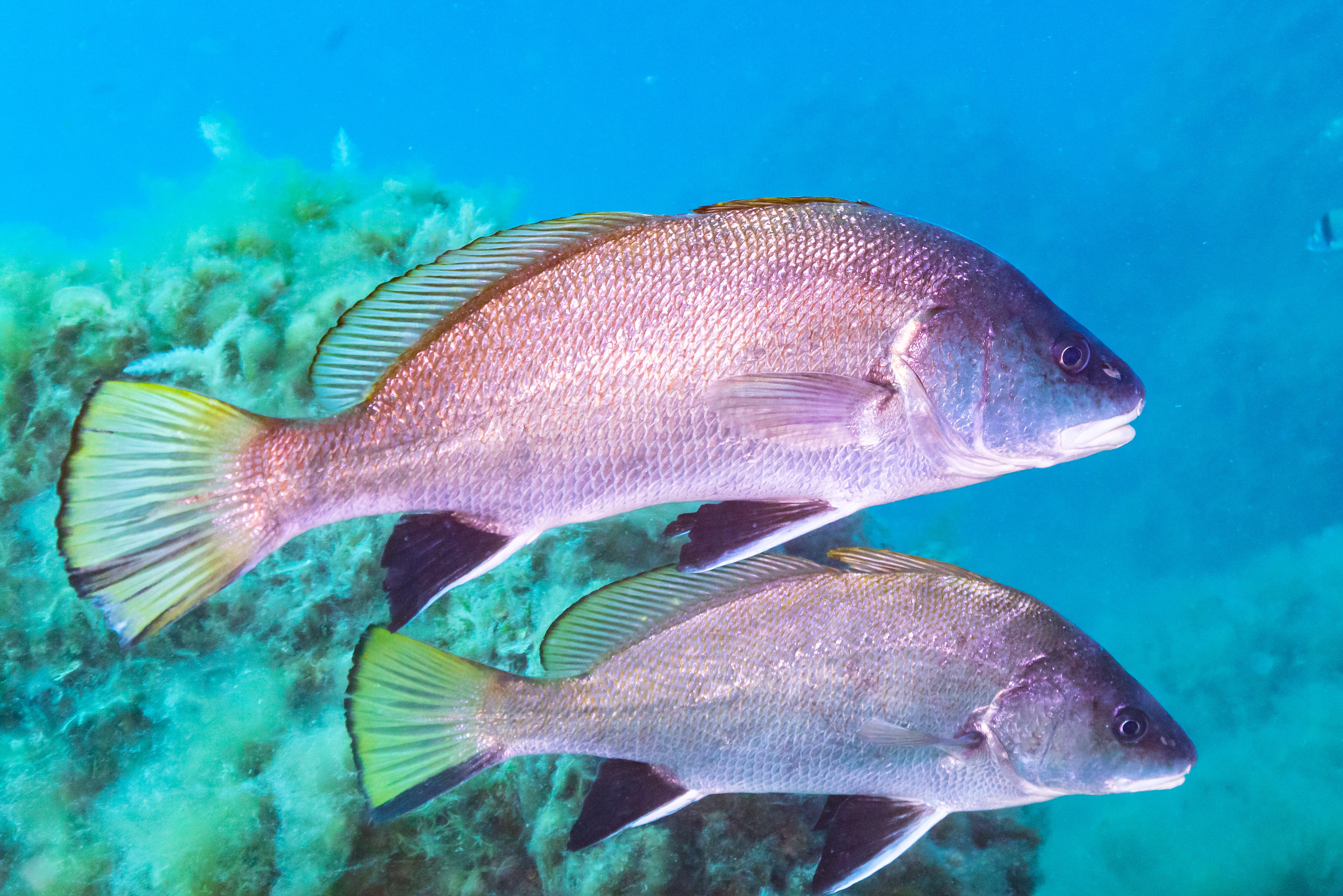

Conservation status
- Near Threatened (IUCN 3.1)

Scientific classification
- Kingdom: Animalia
- Phylum: Chordata
- Class: Actinopterygii
- Division: Teleostei
- Order: Acanthuriformes
- Family: Sciaenidae
- Genus: Sciaena
- Species: S. umbra

Binomial name
- Sciaena umbra Linnaeus, 1758

Synonyms
- List: Bairdiella umbra Linnaeus, 1758; Coracinus chalcis Pallas, 1814; Corvina canariensis Cuvier, 1830; Corvina nigra misapplied name; Corvina umbra Linnaeus, 1758; Johnius nigra misapplied name; Johnius umbra Linnaeus, 1758; Sciaena nigra Bloch, 1792

= Brown meagre =

Species of fish

The brown meagre or corb (Sciaena umbra) is a species of marine ray-finned fish belonging to the family Sciaenidae, the drums and croakers. This species found in the eastern Atlantic, the Mediterranean Sea and the Black Sea, occurring in shallow waters with sandy bottoms. It is harvested for human consumption, especially in the Mediterranean.

== Taxonomy ==
The brown meagre was first formally described in 1758 by Carl Linnaeus in the 10th edition of his Systema Naturae; the type locality was given as Zadar, Croatia. In 1972, the ICZN set this species to be the type species of the genus Sciaena. The genus Sciaena is placed in the subfamily Sciaeninae by some authors, but the 5th edition of Fishes of the World does not recognize subfamilies within the Sciaenidae (which it places in the order Acanthuriformes).

== Etymology ==
The specific name umbra is derived from Latin, meaning "shadow" or "phantom". The generic name is derived from the Greek word skiaina (or skion), which is used to refer to the red mullet.

== Distribution ==
The brown meagre is found in the eastern Atlantic Ocean from the southern English Channel to Senegal and Cape Verde, including the Canary Islands. Records from West Africa south of Senegal are questionable. It is also found in the Mediterranean Sea (where the IUCN classifies it as Vulnerable), the Black Sea and the Sea of Azov.

== Habitat ==
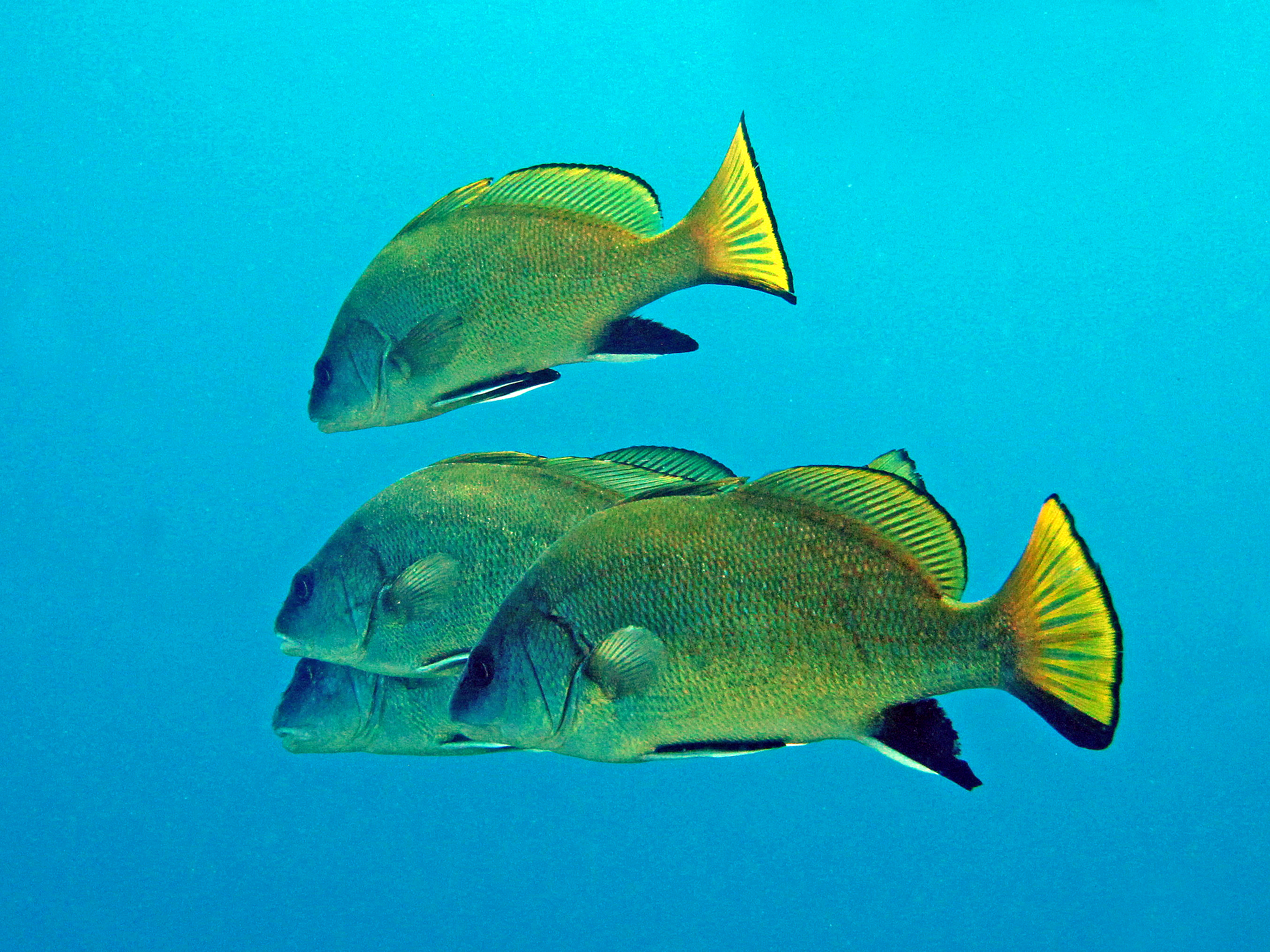
Brown meagres from the Ligurian Sea

The brown meagre is found at depths between 5–200 m (16–656 ft), mainly over rocky and sandy substrates. Juveniles also enter estuarine environments.

== Description ==
The brown meagre is usually between 30–40 cm (12–16 in) in length but may grow to 60 cm (24 in). It has a flat belly and a strongly arched back, giving it an easily recognizable shape. The body is laterally compressed and the large, horizontal mouth reaches the level of the eye and contains villiform teeth. The background color of the body is grey, with flashes of gold and silver. The scales are ctenoid on the nape and the flanks while the head scales are cycloid. The anal and pelvic fins are black with the anterior margins being white. In contrast, the dorsal and the caudal fins are yellow with a black margin. The caudal fin is usually truncate.

== Biology and behavior ==
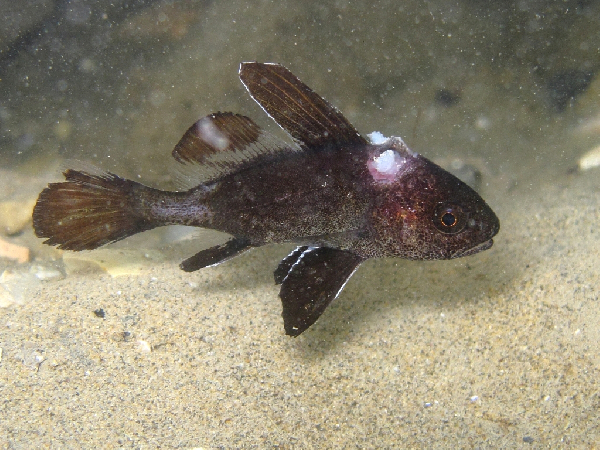
Sciaena umbra juvenile

The brown meagre is a rather nocturnal fish, but it can occasionally be found during the day among beds of seagrass and on rocky bottoms in the vicinity of caves or large crevices (where it can shelter). This species is social and lives in small groups, and it feeds off small fishes, crustaceans and algae. The spawning period is from March to August in the Mediterranean; during this time, this species forms large spawning aggregations near estauries.

Like many other species in the family Sciaenidae, the brown meagre is capable of creating sound using some of the muscles under their well-developed swim bladder. This allows individuals to communicate with each other, since this species has a very good hearing ability. The brown meagre can manage its buoyancy very well.

== Relationship with humans ==
The brown meagre is a commercial species throughout the Mediterranean basin and is fished mainly by spear fishing, trammel nets, and gill nets. It is especially heavily fished when it forms spawning aggregations near estuaries, and overexploitation is a concern.

=== In Turkey ===
The brown meagre is sold fresh or frozen across fish markets in Turkey. This is common in other countries around the Mediterranean as well; what is unique to Turkey is that local people sometimes use the otolith of the brown meagre (after having ground them to powder) to treat urinary tract infections.
