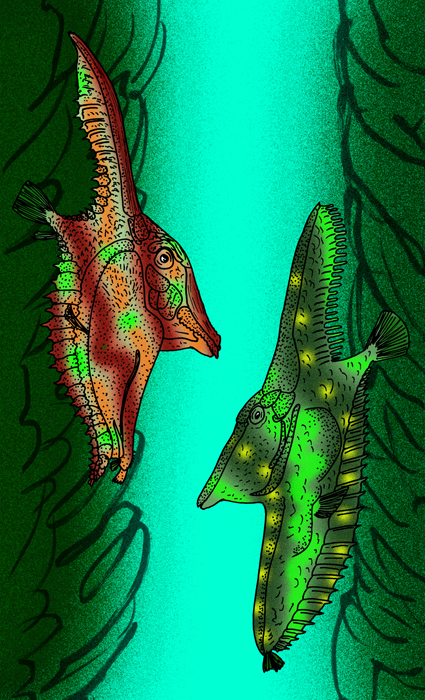
- G. uyenoi (left); G. vexillarius (right)

Scientific classification
- Kingdom: Animalia
- Phylum: Chordata
- Class: Actinopterygii
- Order: †Pycnodontiformes
- Family: †Gebrayelichthyidae
- Genus: †Gebrayelichthys; Nursall & Capasso, 2004

Species
- Gebrayelichthys uyenoi Nursall & Capasso, 2004; Gebrayelichthys verticalis Nursall & Capasso, 2004

= Gebrayelichthys =

Gebrayelichthys Temporal range: Lower Cenomanian

Extinct genus of Pycnodontiform fish

Gebrayelichthys is a genus of pycnodontiform fish of the family Gebrayelichthyidae. It comprises two species, Gebrayelichthys uyenoi and Gebrayelichthys verticalis. Their extremely deep body shape is unique among known fishes, only comparable to some Paleogene tetraodontiformes, and suggests an ostraciiform locomotion.
