= Protosciaena =

Scientific classification
- Kingdom: Animalia
- Phylum: Chordata
- Class: Actinopterygii
- Order: Acanthuriformes
- Family: Sciaenidae
- Genus: Protosciaena; Sasaki, 1989

Type species
- Sciaena trewavasae Chao & Miller, 1975

Small genus of marine ray-finned fishes

Protosciaena is a small genus of marine ray-finned fishes belonging to the family Sciaenidae, the drums and croakers. These fishes are found in the Western Atlantic Ocean.

== Taxonomy ==
Protosciaena was first proposed as a monospecific genus in 1989 by the Japanese ichthyologist Kunio Sasaki to include both P. bathytatos and P. trewavasae, with the latter designated, under its original binomial of Sciaena trewavasae, as the type species. S. trewavasae had originally been described by Labbish Ning Chao and Robert Victor Miller in 1975 with its type locality given as the Caribbean Sea off the coast of Colombia. This taxon was placed in the monotypic subfamily Protosciaeninae by Sasaki, but the 5th edition of Fishes of the World does not recognise subfamilies within the Sciaenidae which it places in the order Acanthuriformes.

== Etymology ==
Protosciaena prefixes Sciaena, the original genus for P. trewavasae, with protos, meaning "first", because of its apparently "primitive nature".

== Species ==
Protosciaena has the following 2 valid species within it:

- Protosciaena bathytatos (Chao & Miller, 1975) (Deep-water drum)
- Protosciaena trewavasae (Chao & Miller, 1975) (New Grenada drum)

== Characteristics ==
Protosciaena drums have rhomboidal to elongate, conmpressed bodies with large eyes and a large mouth opening to the front. The chin has no barbels and 5 pores. The preoperculum is serrated and there is a deep incision separating the first spiny part of the dorsal fin from the rear, largely soft-rayed part. The dorsal fin is supported by a total of 11 spines and 21 to 23 soft rays. The short based anal fin is supported by 2 spines and 7 soft rays. The caudal fin is slightly pointed. Of the two species in the genus, the largest is P. bathytatos with a maximum published total length of 42 cm (17 in) while P. trewavasae has a maximum published total length of 20 cm (7.9 in).

== Distribution ==
Protosciaena drums are endemic to the Greater Caribbean.
