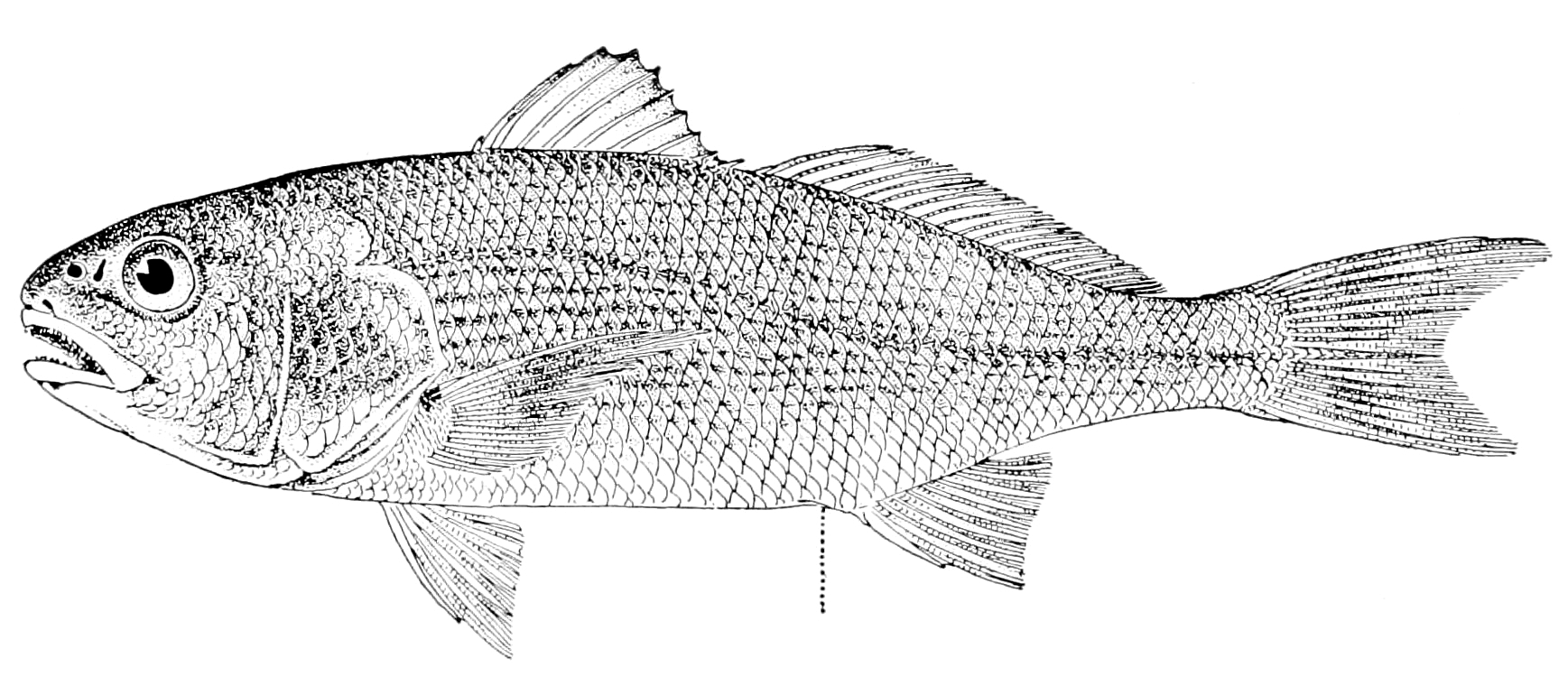

Scientific classification
- Kingdom: Animalia
- Phylum: Chordata
- Class: Actinopterygii
- Order: Acanthuriformes
- Family: Sciaenidae
- Genus: Callaus; Jordan, 1889

Type species
- Corvina deliciosa Tschudi, 1846

= Callaus =

Genus of fishes

Callaus is a genus of ray-finned fishes belonging to the family Sciaenidae, the drums and croakers. The genus is found in the eastern Pacific Ocean off the coast of western South America.

== Species ==
Callaus has 2 species classified within it, one of which is extinct:

- †Callaus cubaguanus Aguilera, Schwarzhans & Béarez, 2016
- Callaus deliciosa Tschudi, 1846 (Lorna drum)

† means extinct
