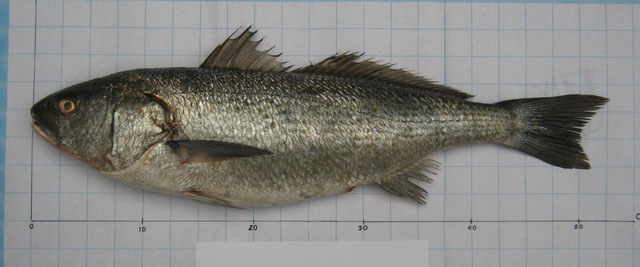

Conservation status
- Critically Endangered (IUCN 3.1)

Scientific classification
- Kingdom: Animalia
- Phylum: Chordata
- Class: Actinopterygii
- Order: Acanthuriformes
- Family: Sciaenidae
- Genus: Sciaena
- Species: S. callaensis

Binomial name
- Sciaena callaensis Hildebrand, 1946

= Callao drum =

Species of ray-finned fish

The Callao drum (Sciaena callaensis) is a species of marine ray-finned fish belonging to the family Sciaenidae, the drums and croakers. This species is found in the eastern Pacific cean where it is endemic to the coast of Peru.
