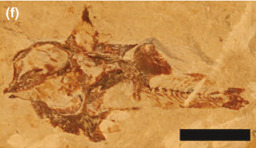
- Holotype specimen

Scientific classification
- Kingdom: Animalia
- Phylum: Chordata
- Class: Actinopterygii
- Order: †Pycnodontiformes
- Family: †Coccodontidae
- Genus: †Corusichthys; Taverne & Capasso, 2014
- Species: †C. megacephalus

Binomial name
- †Corusichthys megacephalus Taverne & Capasso, 2014

= Corusichthys =

Corusichthys Temporal range: Late Cenomanian

Extinct genus of fishes

Corusichthys is an extinct marine pycnodontiform that lived during the Late Cretaceous of what is now Lebanon. It contains a single species, C. megacephalus from the late Cenomanian-aged Haqel site of the Sannine Formation.

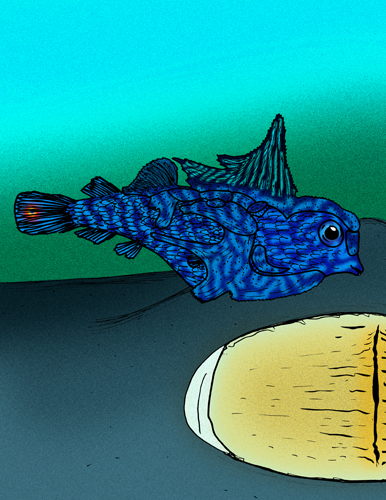
Life restoration

C. megacephalus is known from a 34 mm long fossil. It had plates arranged like a helmet around its head, and had a massive, triangular spine on its dorsal side. C. megacephalus is closely related the genera Trewavasia and Hensodon, as well as Coccodus.

== See also ==
- Prehistoric fish
- List of prehistoric bony fish
