= Batrachoides gracilentus =

Batrachoides gracilentus Temporal range: Early Miocene

Scientific classification
- Kingdom: Animalia
- Phylum: Chordata
- Class: Actinopterygii
- Division: Teleostei
- Order: Batrachoidiformes
- Family: Batrachoididae
- Genus: Batrachoides
- Species: †B. gracilentus

Binomial name
- †Batrachoides gracilentus Aguilera et al., 2014

Extinct species of Batrachoides

Batrachoides gracilentus is an extinct species of Batrachoides that lived during the Early Miocene.

== Distribution ==
Otolith fossils of Batrachoides gracilentus are known from the Pirabas Formation of Brazil.
