= Pirskenius =

Pirskenius Temporal range: Early Miocene

Scientific classification
- Domain: Eukaryota
- Kingdom: Animalia
- Phylum: Chordata
- Class: Actinopterygii
- Order: Perciformes
- Genus: †Pirskenius; Obrhelová, 1961

Extinct genus of fishes

Pirskenius is an extinct genus of prehistoric bony fish that lived during the early part of the Miocene epoch.

== See also ==
- Prehistoric fish
- List of prehistoric bony fish
