= Orangel A. Aguilera =

== List of taxa named by Orangel A. Aguilera ==
=== A ===
- Amazonasciaena
- Amazonasciaena rossettiae
- Aplodinotus santosi
- Atractoscion odeai

=== B ===
- Bagre protocaribbeanus
- Batrachoides confluentus
- Batrachoides gracilentus
- Benthosema pluridens

=== C ===
- Callaus cubaguanus
- Cantarius
- Cantarius nolfi
- Carcharhinus caquetius
- Cataetyx stringeri
- Cathorops goeldii
- Ceratoscopelus priscus
- Chlamydoselachus landinii
- Cynoscion latiostialis
- Cynoscion prolixus
- Cynoscion scitulus

=== E ===
- Equetulus
- Equetulus amazonensis
- Equetulus davidandrewi

=== I ===
- Isopisthus acer

=== L ===
- Lamprogrammus manzanilla
- Larimus angosturae
- Larimus humboldti
- Larimus pandus
- Lepophidium borbonensis
- Lepophidium crebrum
- Lepophidium gentilis
- Lepophidium leai
- Lepophidium limulum
- Lepophidium refugum

=== N ===
- Nebris dioneae
- Neobythites huddlestoni

=== O ===
- Ogilbichthys dariensis
- Ophidion bowdenensis
- Ophidion pauxillicauda
- Ophidion sporoformis
- Ophioscion amphiamericanus
- Ophioscion inflaticauda
- Ophioscion transitivus

=== P ===
- Paraconger paraensis
- Plagioscion travassosi
- Plagioscion ultimus
- Polycirrhus jaramilloi
- Polycirrhus mustus
- Porichthys atalaianus
- Protolarimus
- Protolarimus henrici
- Protolarimus lundbergi
- Protolarimus mauryae
- Protonebris
- Protonebris sanchezi
- Protosciaena brasiliensis
- Pythonichthys pirabasensis

=== S ===
- Sanopus mendax
- Sanopus peregrinus
- Sciaenops rossettiae
- Stellifer abbreviatus
- Stellifer acerbus
- Stellifer bicornutus
- Stellifer depressifrons
- Stellifer onzole
- Syacium predorsalis

=== T ===
- Thalassophryne aequaliter
- Thalassophryne pumilus

=== U ===
- Umbrina abbreviata
- Umbrina bananensis
- Umbrina laxa
- Umbrina opima
- Umbrina sublima
- Umbrina surda

=== X ===
- Xenotolithus retrolobatus
- Xenotolithus semiostialis
