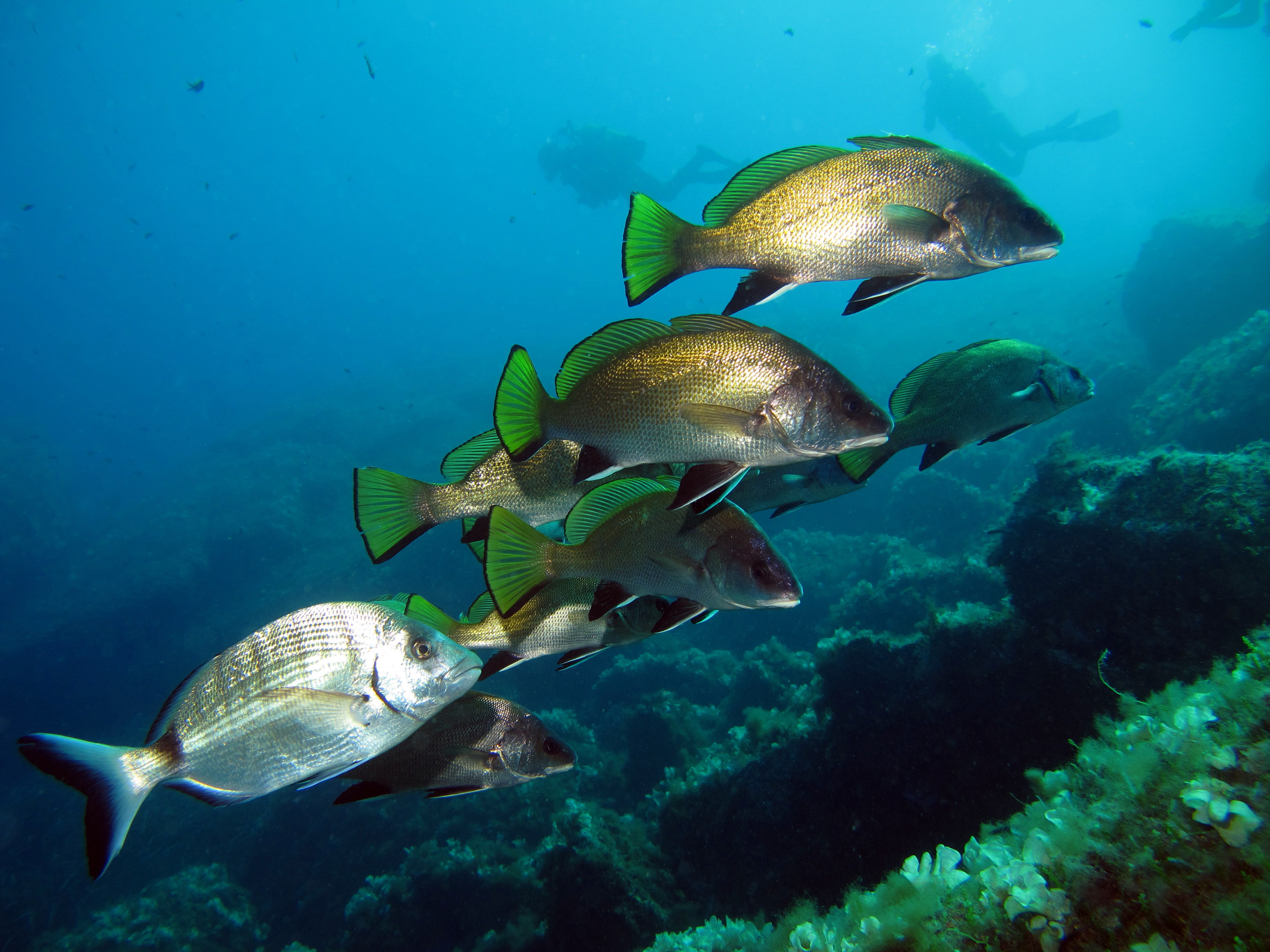
- Sciaena umbra

Scientific classification
- Kingdom: Animalia
- Phylum: Chordata
- Class: Actinopterygii
- Order: Acanthuriformes
- Family: Sciaenidae
- Genus: Sciaena; Linnaeus, 1758

Type species
- Sciaena umbra Linnaeus, 1758

Synonyms
- Coracinus Pallas, 1814; Corvina Cuvier, 1829; Excursor Gistel, 1848; Melantha Gistel, 1848

= Sciaena =

Genus of fishes

Sciaena is a genus of marine ray-finned fishes belonging to the family Sciaenidae, the drums and croakers. These fishes are found in the Eastern Pacific Ocean and the Eastern Atlantic Ocean.

== Taxonomy ==
Sciaena was first proposed as a genus in 1758 by Carl Linnaeus when he described Sciaena umbra in the 10th edition of his Systema Naturae. The genus has, at one time or another, included many of the larger Sciaenid species but it is now considered to comprise two valid species, one in the eastern Pacific and one in the eastern Atlantic. However, other authors have argued that the Pacific and Atlantic species are not closely related and that Sciaena sensu stricto is monospecific. They further argue that Sciaena callaensis is probably a synonym of Sciaena deliciosa and that this species should be classified in the genus Callaus.

Sciaena is the type genus of subfamily Sciaeninae recognised by some workers, but the 5th edition of Fishes of the World does not recognise subfamilies within the Sciaenidae which it places in the order Acanthuriformes.

== Etymology ==
Sciaena is thought to have been derived from the Greek skiaina, a name used for marine fishes which resembled perch and in modern usage means Sciaenids.

== Species ==
There are currently two recognised species in this genus:

- Sciaena callaensis Hildebrand, 1946 (Callao drum)
- Sciaena umbra Linnaeus, 1758 (Brown meagre)

== Characteristics ==
Sciaena drums have elongate. torpedo-shaped bodies, the body's height being around one-third of its standard length. They have a small to moderately sized, oblique mouth with the teeth arranged in bands on the jaws. They do not have any barbels on the chin. The preoperculum is unserrated, or it may be slightly serrated at its corner. There is a deep incision between the spiny and soft-rayed portions of the dorsal fin, which is supported by 10 or 11 spines and between 21 and 24 soft rays. The short based anal fin is supported by 2 spines and 9 or 10 soft rays with the second spine being half the length of the first ray. The body is covered in relatively large ctenoid scales. The largest species in the genus is the brown meagre (S. umbra) with a maximum published total length of 70 cm (28 in).

== Distribution ==
Sciaena drums are found in the eastern Pacific Ocean off western South America and in the eastern Atlantic Ocean, in the Mediterranean Sea and in the Black Sea.
