= Natgeosocus =

Natgeosocus Temporal range: Early Oligocene

Scientific classification
- Kingdom: Animalia
- Phylum: Chordata
- Class: Actinopterygii
- Order: Lampriformes
- Family: †Palaeocentrotidae
- Genus: †Natgeosocus
- Species: †N. sorini

Binomial name
- †Natgeosocus sorini Bannikov, 2014

Extinct genus of fishes

Natgeosocus is an extinct genus of palaeocentrotid that lived during the Rupelian stage of the Oligocene epoch.

== Distribution ==
Natgeosocus sorini is known from Russia, specifically from the northern Caucasus Mountains.
