= Kanodus =

Kanodus Temporal range: Middle Permian

Scientific classification
- Kingdom: Animalia
- Phylum: Chordata
- Class: Chondrichthyes
- Subclass: Holocephali
- Order: †Cochliodontiformes
- Family: †Psephodontidae
- Genus: †Kanodus
- Species: †K. robustus

Binomial name
- †Kanodus robustus Ivanov & Lebedev, 2014

Extinct genus of fishes

Kanodus is an extinct genus of cartilaginous fish in the order Cochliodontiformes. The genus lived during the Guadalupian epoch of the Permian period.

== Distribution ==
Kanodus robustus is known from the Kanin Peninsula of the Nenets Autonomous District in Russia.
