= Batrachoides confluentus =

Batrachoides confluentus Temporal range: Early Miocene

Scientific classification
- Kingdom: Animalia
- Phylum: Chordata
- Class: Actinopterygii
- Division: Teleostei
- Order: Batrachoidiformes
- Family: Batrachoididae
- Genus: Batrachoides
- Species: †B. confluentus

Binomial name
- †Batrachoides confluentus Aguilera et al., 2014

Extinct species of fish

Batrachoides confluentus is an extinct species of Batrachoides that lived during the Early Miocene.

== Distribution ==
Batrachoides confluentus is known from the Pirabas Formation of Brazil.
