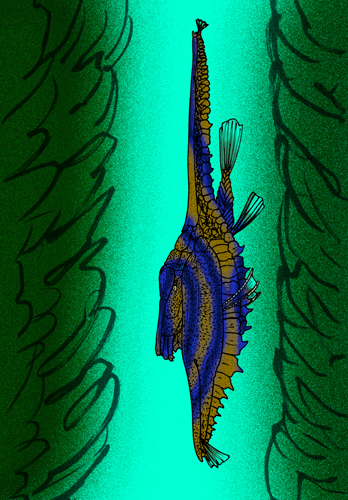

Scientific classification
- Kingdom: Animalia
- Phylum: Chordata
- Class: Actinopterygii
- Order: †Pycnodontiformes
- Family: †Gebrayelichthyidae
- Genus: †Maraldichthys; Taverne & Capasso, 2014

Type species
- Maraldichthys verticalis Taverne & Capasso, 2014

= Maraldichthys =

Maraldichthys Temporal range: Lower Cenomanian

Extinct genus and species of Pycnodontiform fish

Maraldichthys verticalis is a species of pycnodontiform fish of the family Gebrayelichthyidae, the only in the monotypic genus Maraldichthys. It lived during the Cenomanian of Lebanon.

== Discovery and Naming ==
Maraldichthys is known from the Sannine Formation in Haqel, Lebanon. This species is only known from the holotype MSNM N° V 3868, which is fully complete and well preserved. The species was first described in 2014 by Louis Taverne, and Luigi Capasso.

The generic name for Maraldichthys is derived from two words, from Jacques-Philippe Maraldi who was the first to consider the petrified fish from Lebanon fossils, and the Greek word ἰχθύς, ichthys, meaning fish. The epithet verticalis comes from the fact to how tall this species compared to its length.
