= Mamulichthys =

Mamulichthys Temporal range: Guadalupian ~272–259 Ma
- Restoration of Mamulichthys ignotus

Scientific classification
- Kingdom: Animalia
- Phylum: Chordata
- Order: †Discordichthyiformes
- Family: †Discordichthyidae
- Genus: †Mamulichthys; Minich, 2014

Type species
- Mamulichthys ignotus Minich, 2014

Extinct genus of fishes

Mamulichthys is an extinct genus of bony fish in the order Discordichthyiformes only known from the middle Permian of Russia. Like other members of its order, the fish differs from the majority of other bony fish due to the presence of fin spines on its pectoral and dorsal fins. The fish is one of the most complete members of the order, with the holotype specimen preserving a majority of the body, up to around the second dorsal fin. More recently, Mamulichthys has been thought to potentially be a synonym of another member of the order ,Mutovinia, due to the similarities in their odontode shape. There is currently one species in the genus: M. ignotus.

== History and Classification ==
Mamulichthys was described by A. V. Minikh in 2014 based on the holotype and only specimen (SGU, no. 104B/3190) that was found in Amanak Formation located in the Orenburg Region of Russia. The locality the material is from, referred to as the Kichkass locality, was originally a copper mine dump only to be excavated decades later by the Research Institute of Geology of SGU during the summers of 1984-1987. The remains of Mamulichthys, along with a number of other fish from the locality, were collected as part of these excavations in 1985. The holotype specimen is laterally compressed and preserved the front section of the fish. Even with these more incomplete remains compared to many other fossil fish, the remains present make Mamulichthys the most complete member of the order Discordichthyiformes. A 2025 publication by A. S. Bakaev and coauthors suggested that the genus could be a synonym of another taxon in the order, Mutovinia stella, due to the shape of the odontodes on the dermal bones of the specimen.

The name Mamulichthys is a combination of "Mamul" which is referred to as an arbitrary combination of letters along with the Greek word "ichthys" which means fish. The species name 'ignotus' in reference to its unknown nature.

=== Classification ===
The placement of Mamulichthys and Discordichthyiformes remains unknown with the group currently being considered members of Osteichthyes that are neither ray-finned or lobe-finned fish. This is mainly due to the presence of fin spines along with the morphology and histology of the dermal bones. Based on these features, they are generally considered to be basal bony fish at present time.

== Description ==
Mamulichthys was not a large fish with an estimated total length of 250 millimetres (9.8 in) and a height of 65 millimetres (2.6 in). Though the specimen this flattened, a majority of the skull along with parts of the dorsal and pectoral fins are preserved in the specimen. Along with those, a large amount of scales are also preserved including the rows that would have been positioned in the dorsal and ventral regions.

=== Skull ===
The snout of Mamulichthys is poorly preserved with the only bones known from the anterior-most part of the skull being the rostro-premaxillary and the nasals. The rostro-premaxillary is a unit seen in a number of earlier ray-finned fish groups that is made up of a fused rostral and premaxillary bone. This unit is in contact with the nasal and most likely the postrostral bone towards the top and the maxilla near the bottom. The nasal bone is large with a tongue-shaped projection pointing backwards which would have made up the anterior portion of the orbit. The bone possesses two notches, one at the front and the other at the back. The maxilla is much larger than the rostro-premaxillary and spanned far past the orbital cavity; the bone curves downwards and widens past the cavity. The lower jaw is similarly large to the upper jaw though slightly longer and also increases in depth posteriorly. Most of the upper and lower dentition is made up of small to medium, cone-shaped teeth with the teeth on the maxilla being smaller and more widely-spaced than those on the mandible. The largest teeth of the fish are found on the rostro-premaxillary, though the exact tooth count is unknown. All of these bones have a large amount of tubercules that range from round to triangular in shape. The tubercules near the mouth on the maxilla and mandible are cone-shaped and point towards the teeth. Though not well known due to the poor preservation in the area, the bones in the postorbital region of the skull are present.

The skull roof of Mamulichthys is poorly known with the exact size and shape of the bones being unknown even though they are present in the specimen. Certain parts of the material have been interpreted to belong to the frontal and parietal bones but all outer skeletal material in this region is not known. There are small triangular bones found behind the parietal which have been suggested to be extrascapulars. These are some of the few preserved bones to be noted to lack the ornamentation that is present on many other bones. These bones would have been in contact with the posterior-most bones in the skull roof, the suprascapular bones, which were much larger and would have had similar ornamentation to the rest of the bones. Like other portions of the skull, the opercular region of the skull is poorly known with the only two bones known being the operculum and the preoperculum. Though being present in the material, the shape and size of the preoperculum is unknown though it is suggested that the bone could have been mostly vertical. The operculum, on the other hand, is more well preserved with the bone being very rounded.

=== Postcrania ===
The pectoral region of Mamulichthys with one of the more well-preserved regions of the fish with most of the bones being present in the specimen. Like the cranial bones, these bones possessed convex, triangular to round tubercules. The cleithrum of the fish is a large, tall bone with it reaching the operculum. This bone had both a vertical and dorsal rami, with the presence of the vertical ramus setting the fish apart from its relative Geryonichthys. The supracleithrum was a similarly large bone though was much more rectangular than the cleithrum. It would have been positioned behind the operculum, with the front edge of the bone being concave inline with the outline of the other bone.

The pectoral and dorsal fins are known from the fish which are both very different than what is associated with bony fish at the time. The fish would have had two separate dorsal fins that each possessed a fin spine like a number of chondrichthyans. The first one is located near the head and is largely covered in tubercules with range from ovular to triangular in shape. These tubercules were not present on the ventral surface of the spine. This is in contrast to the second fin spine which is around half the size of the front spine, though is incomplete. Unlike the with the dorsal fins, the pectoral fins preserve the fin itself rather than just the fin spine. The fin spine itself is incomplete though even based on the fragment, it would have been very large with a length of at least 25 millimetres (0.98 in). Though wide at the base, it would decrease in width posteriorly. Like the dorsal fin spines, the pectoral fin spines possess ornamentation with the posterior surface having tubercules similar in shape to what was seen in the first dorsal fin spine while the lateral surfaces have smaller triangular tubercules. The remains of the fin itself are preserved above the base of the pectoral fin spine. These remains are made up of three unsegmented rays with a number of smaller, segmented fin ray fragments above them. The rays have similar ornamentation to the later surfaces of the pectoral fin rays.

Scales are preserved from multiple parts of the body with one of the main regions being right behind the head. These overlapping scales are tall and possess a large spine. Like many of the bones in the body, they had a large amount of tubercules which would have been elongate and triangular in shape. These tubercules were closely-spaced and would have gone slightly past the posteriors border of the scales. In contrast to this, the scales in the back and on the sides of the fish were much more rhomboid and are generally shorter than those closer to the head. The most complex squamation of Mamulichthys is present on the abdominal region, being made up of five rows. The first row is made up of the large, sickle-shaped ventrolateral scales that overlapped one another. Like other scales, these were heavily ornamented with the tubercules largely overhanging the scales and overlaying the scale behind the one that they are attached to. These ventrolateral scales are overlain by the side scales dorsally. These side scales differ in shape based on the row with the first row being more rectangular and the second being much more triangular triangular. The scales in these two rows are much smoother than the ventrolateral scales though still do possess some small, almost triangular tubercules that point backwards at there highest point.
