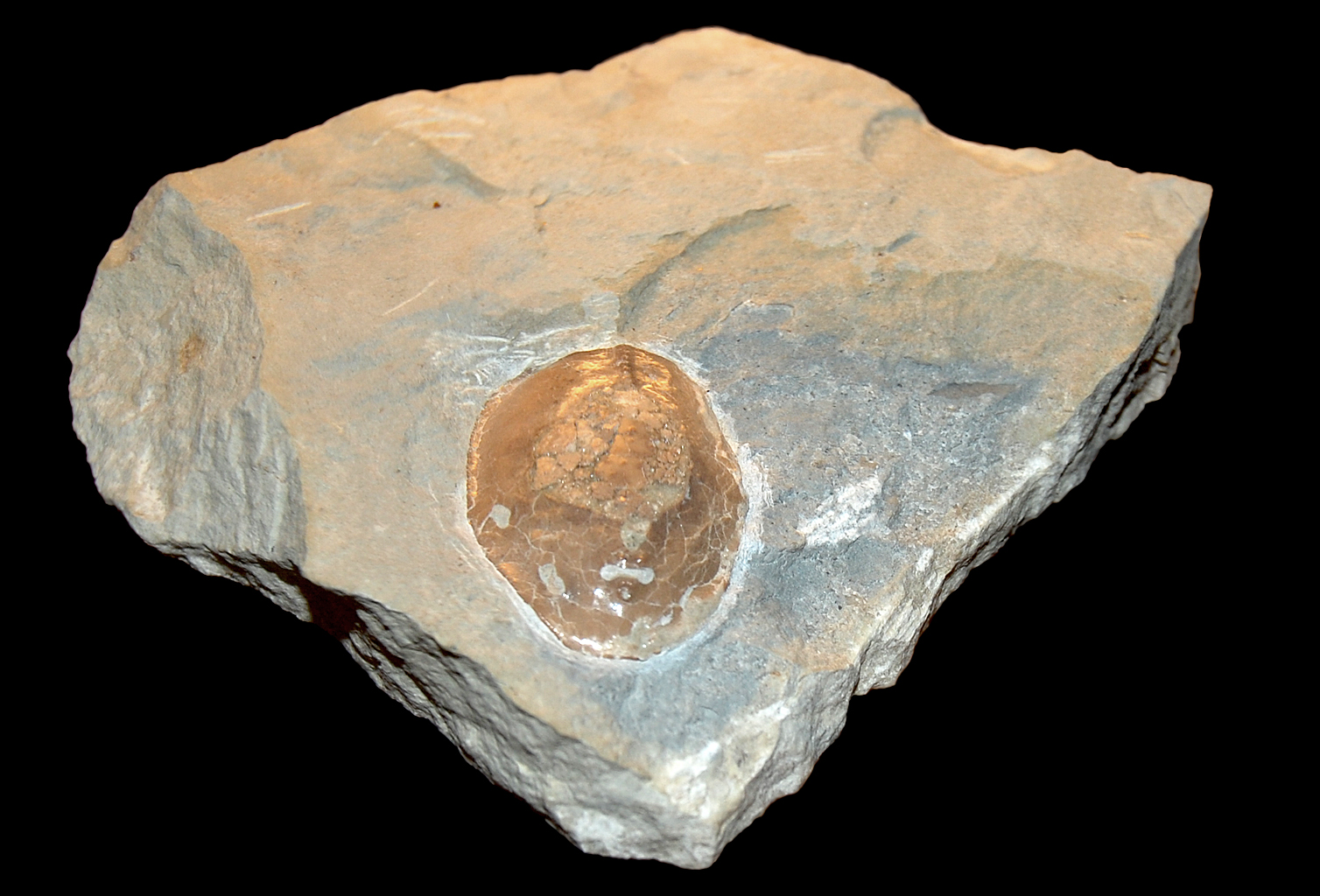
- Fossil in Vienna

Scientific classification
- Kingdom: Animalia
- Phylum: Chordata
- Infraphylum: Agnatha
- Class: †Osteostraci
- Order: †Thyestiida
- Family: †Tremataspidae
- Genus: †Tremataspis

= Tremataspis =

Tremataspis Temporal range: Late Silurian

Genus of prehistoric jawless fish

Tremataspis is a genus of an extinct osteostracan agnathan from the Silurian period of what is now Estonia.

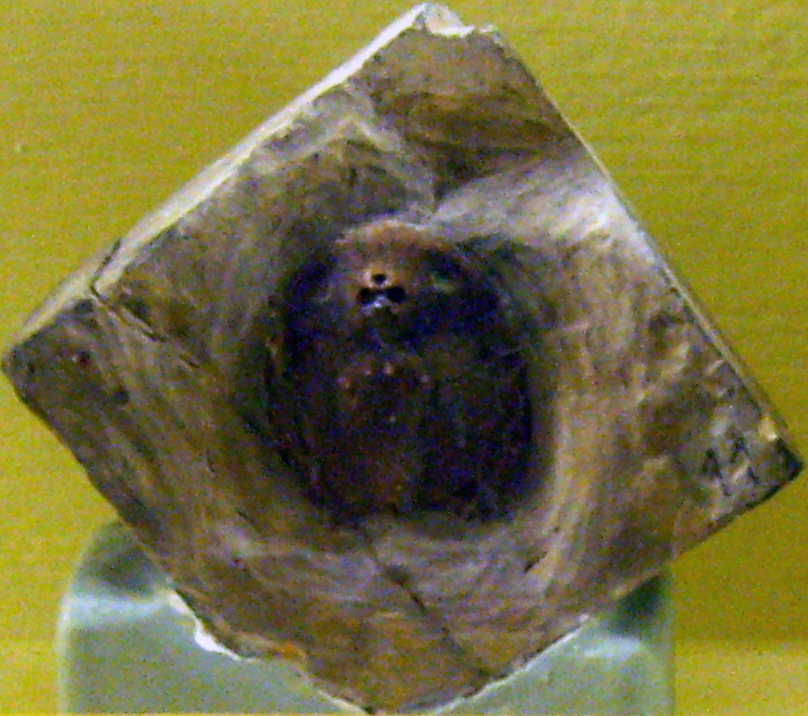
Tremataspis schmidtii head and body armour at the Museum für Naturkunde, Berlin

Tremataspis was about 10 centimetres (3.9 in) in length, and had an armored shield covering its head. Compared with its relatives, the shield was unusually elongated, covering the whole front of the body, and was more rounded in shape, an unusual characteristic for an osteostracan species. It is thought that Tremataspis used its rounder shield to burrow in the ocean floor, searching for food. Because the shield consisted of one solid piece, it probably did not grow during the animal's life; presumably, the larvae lacked the shield, which only appeared later in life.

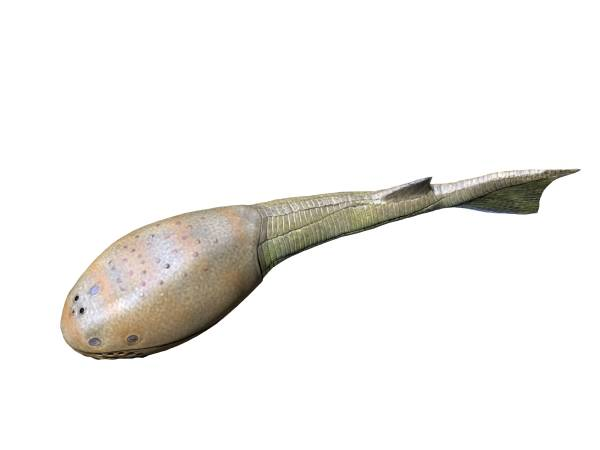
Life reconstruction Tremataspis mammillata
