= Millerolepis =

Millerolepis Temporal range: Bashkirian

Scientific classification
- Domain: Eukaryota
- Kingdom: Animalia
- Phylum: Chordata
- Class: Actinopterygii
- Family: †Haplolepidae
- Genus: †Millerolepis
- Species: †M. eleionomae

Binomial name
- †Millerolepis eleionomae Elliott, 2014

Extinct genus of fishes

Millerolepis is an extinct genus of haplolepid fish that lived during the Bashkirian stage of the Pennsylvanian epoch.

== Distribution ==
Millerolepis eleionomae is known from the Drumgray coal shales of the United Kingdom.
