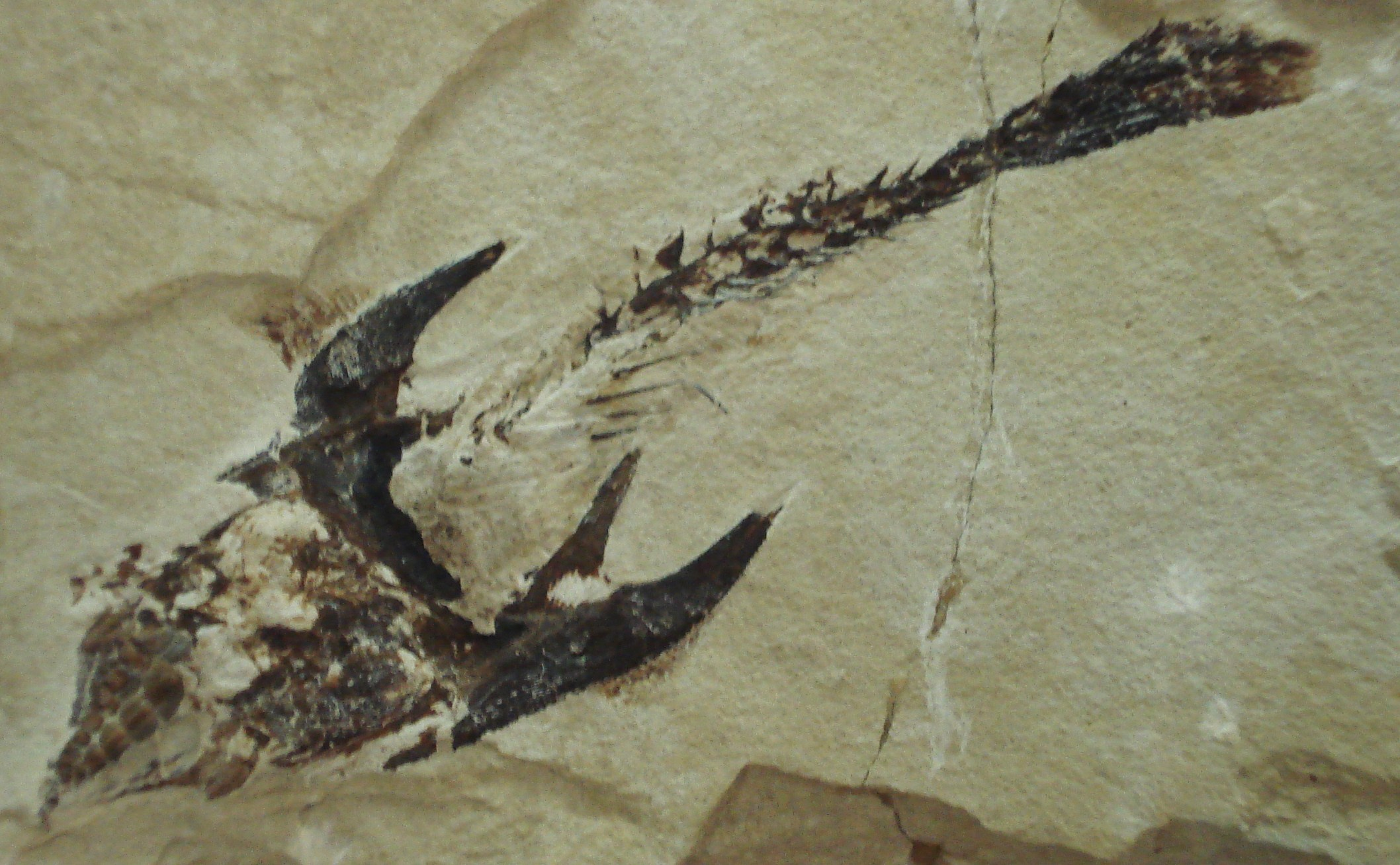
- Coccodus insignis

Scientific classification
- Kingdom: Animalia
- Phylum: Chordata
- Class: Actinopterygii
- Order: †Pycnodontiformes
- Superfamily: †Coccodontoidea
- Family: †Coccodontidae; Berg, 1940

Genera
- Coccodus; Corusichthys; Hensodon; Paracoccodus; Trewavasia

= Coccodontidae =

Coccodontidae Temporal range: Lower Cenomanian

Extinct family of fishes

Coccodontidae is a family of extinct pycnodontid fish that lived during the lower Cenomanian. The various genera had massive, curved spines.

The family is composed of five genera, the type genus, Coccodus, Paracoccodus which was split off from Coccodus, the newly described Corusichthys, the sexually dimorphic Hensodon, and Trewavasia. Ichthyoceros was, at one time, placed in Coccodontidae, but then was moved with Trewavasia in "Trewavasiidae," and then, in 2014, was placed in the related pycnodontid family Gladiopycnodontidae, while Trewavasia was returned to Coccodontidae.

Coccodontidae, together with Gladiopycnodontidae and the superficially shrimpfish-like Gebrayelichthyidae, make up the pycnodontid superfamily Coccodontoidea.

== See also ==
- Prehistoric fish
- List of prehistoric bony fish
