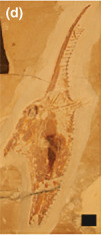

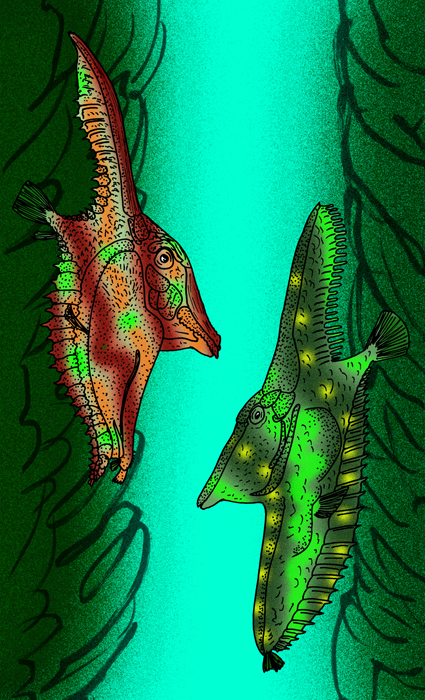
- Gebrayelichthys spp.

Scientific classification
- Kingdom: Animalia
- Phylum: Chordata
- Class: Actinopterygii
- Order: †Pycnodontiformes
- Superfamily: †Coccodontoidea
- Family: †Gebrayelichthyidae; Nursall & Capasso, 2004

Genera
- Gebrayelichthys Nursall & Capasso, 2004; Maraldichthys Taverne & Capasso, 2014

= Gebrayelichthyidae =

Gebrayelichthyidae Temporal range: Lower Cenomanian

Extinct family of fishes

Gebrayelichthyidae is a family of extinct pycnodontid fish, with a superficially shrimpfish-like appearance that lived during the lower Cenomanian.

The family is composed of two genera, the type genus, Gebrayelichthys, and the monotypic Maraldichthys. The Gebrayelichthyids are highly modified in appearance, having their bodies compressed and vertebrae elongated.

Gebrayelichthyidae, together with Gladiopycnodontidae and Coccodontidae, make up the pycnodontid superfamily Coccodontoidea.

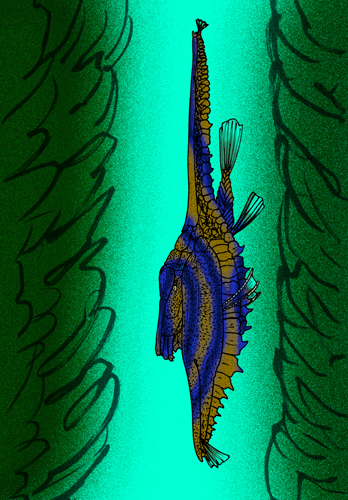
Restoration of Maraldichthys

== Description ==
Gebrayelichthys was strongly flattened on the sides. The body height was 1.8 to 2 times the body length. The head and torso each made up half of the total length. The skull was similar to that of other Pycnodontiformes. The orbit was high up under the curved head profile, the muzzle was long and directed downwards. There were a few pointed teeth on the ploughshare. The anatomy of the lower jaw is unknown due to the lack of evidence.

Behind the skull was a tall bone mast that supported a narrow, high ridge. Throughout the fleshy part of the ridge there were fins carrier (Pterygiophoren). Behind the lower jaw began a deep, laterally flattened abdominal keel, which was also supported in front by a thick, bony stem and was covered at the sides by bone plates. The keel of the abdomen reached as far as the crest of the back. The trailing edge of the abdominal keel was protected by plate-shaped scales, each with a short, thick spike. Most of the entrails were in the keel of the abdomen. At the front part of the belly keel the flashy lay cloaca. The pelvic fins stood on the leading edge of the keel, the pectoral fins about two-thirds of the way up on the keel. There is still a notochord in the spine. The scales are small and limited to the axis of the body and the base of the back crest.

Gebrayelichthys was probably a pelagic fish that ate plankton and small nectonic animals.
