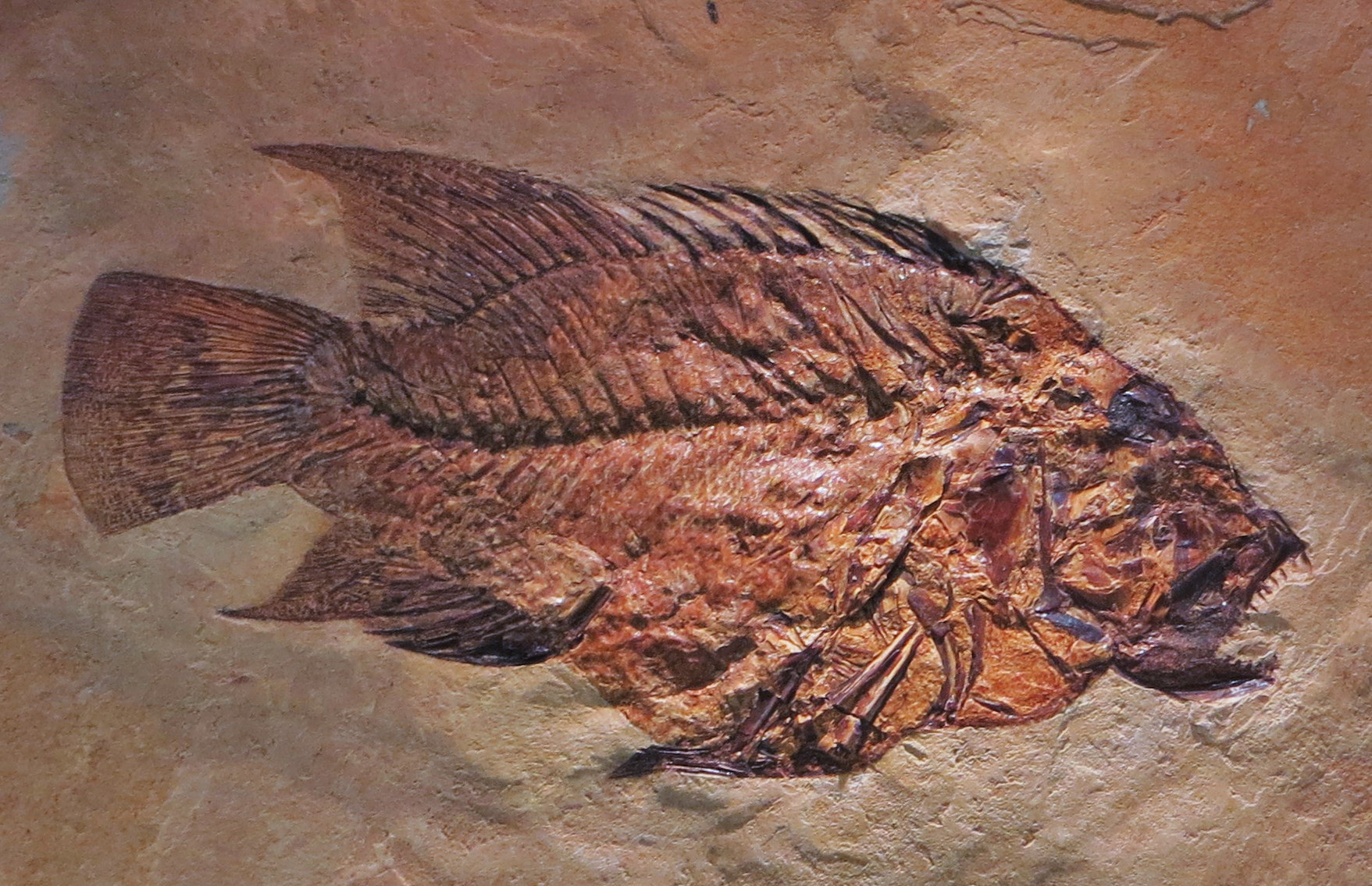
- Pygaeus gigas

Scientific classification
- Kingdom: Animalia
- Phylum: Chordata
- Class: Actinopterygii
- Order: Perciformes
- Genus: †Pygaeus; Agassiz, 1835

= Pygaeus =

Pygaeus Temporal range: Early- Middle Eocene

Extinct genus of fishes

Pygaeus is an extinct genus of prehistoric bony fish that lived from the early to middle Eocene period in Italy.

== See also ==
- Prehistoric fish
- List of prehistoric bony fish
