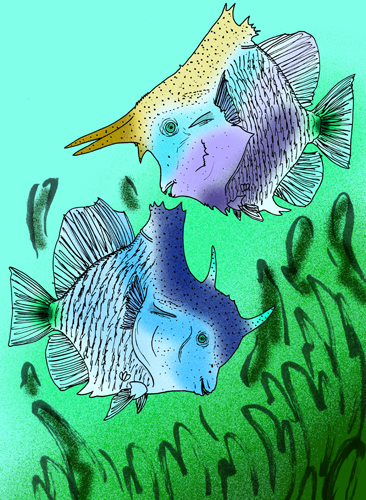
- Artist's impression of a male (top) and female

Scientific classification
- Kingdom: Animalia
- Phylum: Chordata
- Class: Actinopterygii
- Order: †Pycnodontiformes
- Family: †Coccodontidae
- Genus: †Hensodon; Kriwet, 2004
- Species: †H. spinosus

Binomial name
- †Hensodon spinosus Kriwet, 2004

= Hensodon =

Hensodon Temporal range: Late Cretaceous (upper Cenomanian)

Extinct genus of fishes

Hensodon is an extinct genus of marine pycnodont ray-finned fish known from the Late Cretaceous of the Middle East. It contains a single species, H. spinosus, that lived during the upper Cenomanian-aged Sannine Formation of what is now Lebanon. H. spinosus superficially resembled a marine angelfish with a massive head, and a very spiny pectoral girdle. Different specimens have different arrangements of the horn-like frontal spines, and these are potentially thought to represent sexual dimorphism within the species. One form has the horns arranged as a double-prong, assumed to be the male, and the other form, assumed to be the female, having the horns one after the other, like those of a rhinoceros.

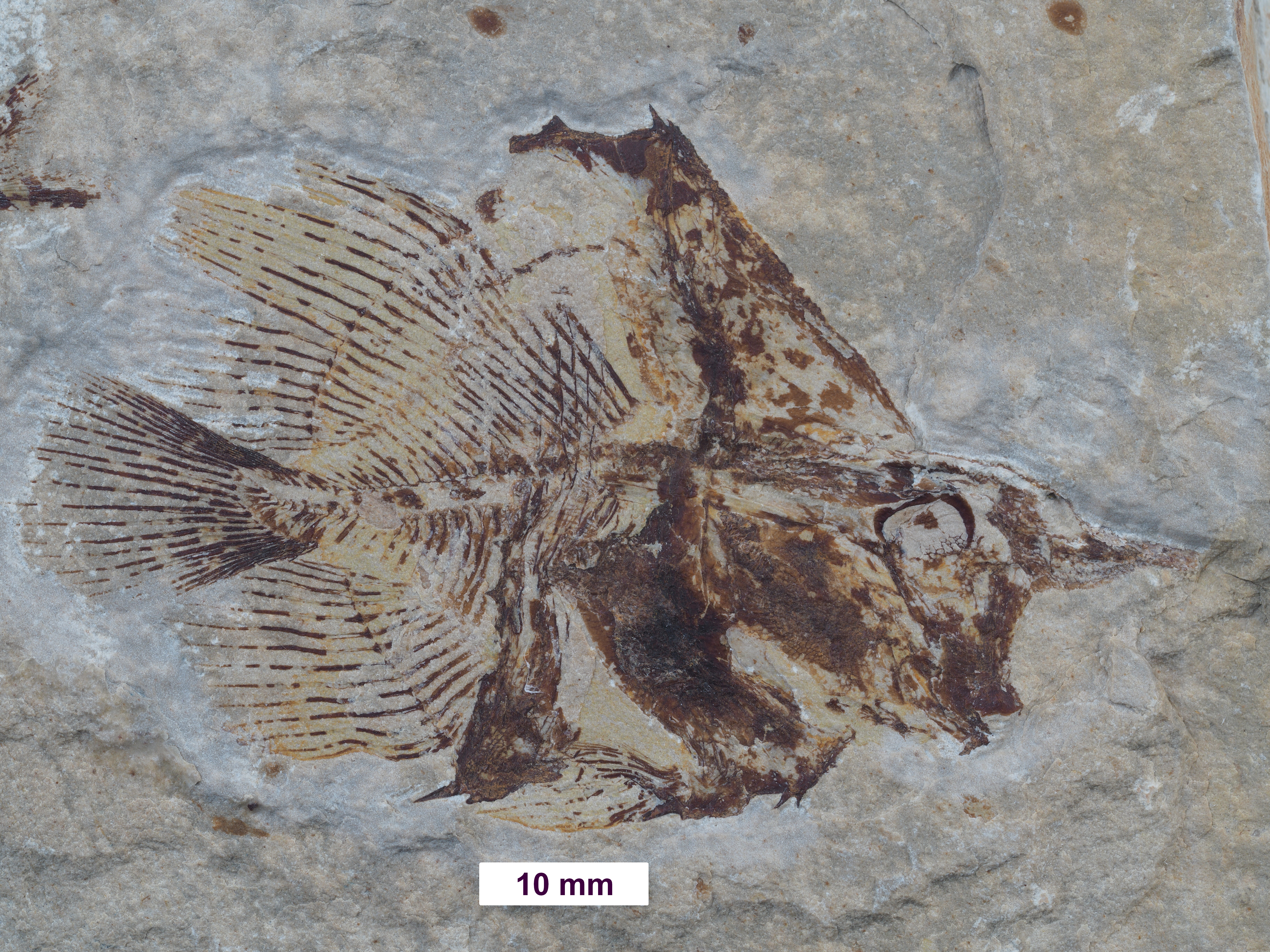
Male specimen of H. spinosus
