= Murrumbidgee Group =

Group of Devonian geologic formations in New South Wales, Australia

- Stratigraphic range: Early Devonian (Pragian–Emsian) 413.02–393.47 Ma
- Type: Geological group
- Sub-units: Cavan Limestone, Majurgong Formation, Taemas Limestone
- Underlies: Hatchery Creek Group
- Overlies: Black Range Group
- Thickness: Between 1,000 m (3,300 ft) and 1,100 m (3,600 ft) (Taemas Limestone in the Goodradigbee Valley)

Lithology
- Primary: Limestone
- Other: Siltstone, sandstone, shale, quartzite

Location
- Location: Yass Valley, New South Wales
- Coordinates: 34.976389°S 148.623056°E
- Region: New South Wales
- Country: Australia
- Murrumbidgee Group (Australia) Murrumbidgee Group (New South Wales)

The Murrumbidgee Group is an Early Devonian (Pragian–Emsian) geologic group located around the Burrinjuck Dam in Yass Valley LGA, New South Wales, Australia, near the border with the Australian Capital Territory. The Burrinjuck area has been said to possess immense national and international significance and preserve a diverse fauna comparable to those of World Heritage listed sites. This fauna is indeed quite speciose even if fossils tend to be mainly isolated yet finely preserved bones, and not only includes placoderms and other fishes, but also corals, bryozoans, stromatoporoids, brachiopods, gastropods, nautiloids and trilobites.

== Stratigraphy ==
In the Taemas-Wee Jasper area, the Murrumbidgee Group comprises three formations: The oldest Cavan Limestone, the middle Majurgong Formation, and the youngest Taemas Limestone Formation. In addition, the Taemas section is split into six constituent members. The Cavan Limestone is also known as the Cavan Bluff Limestone, although this name has fallen out of use as it can cause confusion with the more restricted term 'Bluff Limestone' used by previous workers.

=== Cavan Limestone ===
The Cavan Limestone is composed of three subdivisions; a lower 48 metres (157 ft) section made of flaggy limestone and shale; 48 metres (157 ft) of a middle 'Bluff limestone', and 32 metres (105 ft) of thinly-bedded limestone in the upper strata. The designated type section is at Clear Hill within the Cavan area, under the power cables there. Similarities between the Taemas-Cavan and Wee Jasper areas suggest that either preservation akin to a coastline, or a broad tidal flat, was the likely depositional environment of the Cavan Limestone.

=== Majurgong Formation ===
The Majurgong Formation, a non-calcareous unit consisting primarily of lithic sandstones and shale, features sedimentary structures which preserve cross-bedding and ripple marks. Except in road cuttings in the lower strata where brachiopods and gastropods are known from, the majority of the formation is unfossiliferous. These perhaps suggest brackish water conditions, supporting the interpretation that the Majurgong Formation as being a non-marine deposit, an interruption of the usually shallow and marine deposition within the Murrumbidgee Group, possibly being laid in an estuarine environment. The Majurgong Formation is about 120 metres (390 ft) in the Wee Jasper area.

=== Taemas Limestone ===
The Taemas Limestone starts with its oldest bed, the Spirifer yassensis Limestone Member, which grades out of the uppermost Majurgong Formation. It is the lowest of the six members of the formation. Similar to the Bloomfield Limestone Member, which is the third lowest, the S. yassensis Member consists of calcareous shales and interbedded limestones, and its outcrops tend to be regressive in nature. This is in stark contrast to the Currajong and Receptaculites Limestone Members (5th and 3rd highest respectively), which showcase small reefal bodies within the Goodradigbee valley. Near Taemas-Good Hope, similar large Receptaculites beds are found within the eastern limestone outcrop. The Taemas Formation is thicker in the western Goodradigbee valley 1,000–1,100 metres (3,300–3,600 ft), compared to the east where it measures only ~800 metres (2,600 ft).

Below is a table of the full stratigraphical layout of the Murrumbidgee Group in the eastern outcrop:

Murrumbidgee Group
Stage	Formation	Member (Mbr)	Other
Emsian	Taemas	Crinoidal Limestone Mbr	'Upper Reef Formation'
Emsian	Taemas	Warroo Limestone Mbr	'Upper Reef Formation'
Emsian	Taemas	Receptaculites Limestone Mbr	'Upper Reef Formation'
Emsian	Taemas	Bloomfield Limestone Mbr	
Emsian	Taemas	Currajong Limestone Mbr	
Emsian	Taemas	Spinella yassensis Limestone Mbr	
Emsian	Majurgong		
Uppermost Pragian–Emsian	Cavan		

== Vertebrates ==
Color key: Taxon / Reclassified taxon / Taxon falsely reported as present / Dubious taxon or junior synonym / Ichnotaxon / Ootaxon / Morphotaxon

Notes
Uncertain or tentative taxa are in small text
~~crossed out~~ taxa are discredited.

=== Chondrichthyes ===
Chondrichthyans of the Murrumbidgee Group
Genus	Species	Horizon	Clade	Images
Cambaracanthus (Junior synonym of Taemasacanthus)	C. goodhopensis	Cavan	Ischnacanthiformes, Ischnacanthidae	
Cavanacanthus (Junior synonym of Taemasacanthus)	C. warrooensis	Cavan	Ischnacanthiformes, Ischnacanthidae	
Cheiracanthoides	C. comptus	Receptaculites Limestone Mbr, Taemas	Climatiiformes,Climatiidae	
Ohiolepis	O. sp.	Receptaculites Limestone Mbr, Taemas	Elasmobranchii, incertae sedis	
"Skamolepis"	S. fragilis	Receptaculites Limestone Mbr, Taemas	Chondrichthyes, incertae sedis	
Taemasacanthus	T. cooradigbeensis	Currajong Limestone Mbr, Taemas	Ischnacanthiformes, Ischnacanthidae	Diagram of the left dentary of T. erroli.
Taemasacanthus	T. erroli	Cavan & S. yassensis Mbr, Taemas	Ischnacanthiformes, Ischnacanthidae	Diagram of the left dentary of T. erroli.
Taemasacanthus	T. narrengullenensis	Currajong & Bloomfield Limestone Mbrs, Taemas	Ischnacanthiformes, Ischnacanthidae	Diagram of the left dentary of T. erroli.
Taemasacanthus	T. porca	Cavan	Ischnacanthiformes, Ischnacanthidae	Diagram of the left dentary of T. erroli.
Taemasacanthus	T. cf. erroli	Currajong Limestone Mbr, Taemas	Ischnacanthiformes, Ischnacanthidae	Diagram of the left dentary of T. erroli.

=== Placodermi ===
Placoderms of the Murrumbidgee Group
Genus	Species	Horizon	Clade	Images
Arenipiscis	A. westolli	Receptaculites Limestone Mbr, Taemas	Arthrodira, Buchanosteidae	Restoration of A. westolli.
Bimbianga	B. burrinjuckensis	Cavan & S. yassensis Limestone Mbr, Taemas	Arthrodira, Holonematidae?	
Brindabellaspis	B. stensioi	Bloomfield–Receptaculites Limestone Mbr, Taemas	Brindabellaspida, Brindabellaspidae	A reconstruction of B. stensioi.
Buchanosteus	B. confertituberculatus	S. yassensis & Receptaculites Limestone Mbrs, Taemas	Arthrodira, Buchanosteidae	B. confertituberculatus reconstruction.
Burrinjucosteus	B. asymmetricus	S. yassensis to Warroo Limestone Mbrs, Taemas	Arthrodira, Buchanosteidae	A restoration of B. asymmetricus.
Cathlesichthys	C. weejasperensis	Upper Bloomfield/Lower Receptaculites Limestone Mbrs, Taemas	Arthrodira, Homostiidae	
Cavanosteus	C. australis	Probably Cavan; S. yassensis Limestone Mbr, Taemas	Arthrodira, Homostiidae	
Dhanguura	D. johnstoni	Lower part of Unit 6, matching up with Crinoidal Limestone Mbr, Taemas	Arthrodira, Brachythoraci incertae sedis	
Elvaspis	E. tuberculata	Bloomfield–Receptaculites Limestone Mbr, Taemas	Arthrodira, Williamsaspididae	
Elvaspis	E. whitei	Bloomfield–Receptaculites Limestone Mbr, Taemas	Arthrodira, Williamsaspididae	
Errolosteus	E. goodradigbeensis	Receptaculites Limestone Mbr, Taemas	Arthrodira, Buchanosteidae	E. goodradigbeensis reconstruction.
Goodradigbeeon	G. australianum	Cavan; S. yassensis Limestone Mbr, Taemas	Arthrodira, Buchanosteidae	A reconstruction of G. australianum.
Lunaspis	L. sp.	Uncertain, not mentioned in Young 1985	Petalichthyida, Macropetalichthyidae	Artist's reconstruction of L. broili (larger) and L. heroldi (smaller).
Murrindalaspis	M. wallacei	Near Taemas Bridge (unknown unit)	Acanthothoraci, Weejasperaspididae	Cropped image showing a restoration of M. wallacei.
Notopetalichthys	N. hillsi	Likely Cavan, as the remains were described from Coodravale	Petalichthyida, Macropetalichthyidae	
Ohioaspis	O. tumulosa	Receptaculites Limestone Mbr, Taemas	Incertae sedis (Rhenanida?)	
Parabuchanosteus	P. murrumbidgeensis	S. yassensis, Bloomfield to possibly Crinoidal or Warroo Limestone Mbrs, Taemas. Possibly also Cavan.	Arthrodira, Buchanosteidae	P. murrumbidgeensis reconstruction.
Richardosteus	R. barwickorum	Uncertain, not stated in description paper	Arthrodira, Buchanosteidae	
Shearsbyaspis	S. oepiki	S. yassensis Limestone Mbr, Taemas	Petalichthyida, incertae sedis	
Taemasosteus	T. novaustrocambricus	S. yassensis Limestone Mbr and above, Taemas, and Cavan	Arthrodira, Buchanosteidae	Restoration of T. novaustrocambricus.
Toombsosteus	T. denisoni	Uncertain; stated to be on the shore at south-east end of Goodradigbee Lake, east of the track from Barber’s and Wee Jasper ends	Arthrodira, Buchanosteidae	
Weejasperaspis	W. gavini	Receptaculites, Receptaculites-Bloomfield boundary, and possibly Crinoidal Limestone Mbrs, Taemas	Acanthothoraci, Weejasperaspididae	
Williamsaspis	W. bedfordi	Uncertain; Goodradigbee River	Arthrodira, Williamsaspididae	
Wijdeaspis	W. warrooensis	Middle of Crinoidal Limestone Mbr, Taemas, and either uppermost Crinoidal Limestone Mbr, Taemas, or overlying tuffs and shales	Petalichthyida, incertae sedis	

=== Sarcopterygii ===
Sarcopterygians of the Murrumbidgee Group
Genus	Species	Horizon	Clade	Images
Cathlorhynchus	C. trismodipterus	Currajong Limestone Mbr, Taemas	Dipnoi, Dipnorhynchidae	
Dipnorhynchus	D. cathlesae	Lowermost part of the upper part of the Taemas Limestone. This section has common marine macrofossils, and abundant tabulate & rugose corals (level uncertain)	Dipnoi, Dipnorhynchidae	A reconstruction of D. sp.
Dipnorhynchus	D. kurikae	Currajong to Receptaculites Limestone Mbrs, Taemas	Dipnoi, Dipnorhynchidae	A reconstruction of D. sp.
Dipnorhynchus	D. sussmilchi	S. yassensis Mbr, Taemas.	Dipnoi, Dipnorhynchidae	A reconstruction of D. sp.
Onychodus	O. yassensis	Bloomfield Limestone Mbr, Taemas	Onychodontiformes, Onychodontidae	
Onychodus	O. sp.	Receptaculites Limestone Mbr, Taemas	Onychodontiformes, Onychodontidae	
Speonesydrion	S. iani	Bloomfield–Receptaculites Limestone Mbr, Taemas	Dipnoi, Dipnorhynchidae	

=== Other ===
Other fauna of the Murrumbidgee Group
Genus	Species	Horizon	Clade	Images
Ligulalepis	L. toombsi	Bloomfield–Receptaculites Limestone Mbr, Taemas	Osteichthyes, incertae sedis	Life reconstruction of L. toombsi, based on a skull.
Turinia	sp. cf. T. australiensis	Uppermost Cavan and basal Majurgong Formations	Thelodontiformes, Turiniidae	Reconstruction of T. pagei.

== Invertebrates ==
Color key: Taxon / Reclassified taxon / Taxon falsely reported as present / Dubious taxon or junior synonym / Ichnotaxon / Ootaxon / Morphotaxon

Notes
Uncertain or tentative taxa are in small text
~~crossed out~~ taxa are discredited.

=== Brachiopoda ===
Brachiopods of the Murrumbidgee Group
Genus	Species	Horizon	Clade	Images
Adrenia	A. cernua	Receptaculites & Warroo Limestone Mbrs, Taemas	Terebratulida, Rhipidothyrididae	
Adrenia	A. expansa	Receptaculites & Warroo Limestone Mbrs, Taemas	Terebratulida, Rhipidothyrididae	
Ambothyris	A. runnegari	Receptaculites & Warroo Limestone Mbrs, Taemas	Spiriferida, Ambocoeliidae	
Anatrypa	A. erectirostris	Receptaculites Limestone Mbr, Taemas	Atrypida, Atrypidae	
Athyris	A. waratahensis	Cavan; S. yassensis & Receptaculites Limestone Mbrs, Taemas	Athyridida, Athyrididae	Specimen of the related Athyris concentrica (lateral).
Atrypa	A. penelopeae	Receptaculites Limestone Mbr, Taemas	Atrypida, Atrypidae	Specimen of the related A. reticularis.
Aulacella	A. philipi	Warroo Limestone Mbr, Taemas	Orthida, Rhipidomellidae	
Aulacella	A. stoermeri	Receptaculites & Warroo Limestone Mbrs, Taemas	Orthida, Rhipidomellidae	
Browneella	B. browneae	Receptaculites Limestone Mbr, Taemas	Rhynchonellida, Trigonorhynchiidae	
Callipleura	?C. sp.	Receptaculites Limestone Mbr, Taemas	Rhynchonellida, Rhynchotrematidae	
Coelospira	C. dayi	Receptaculites & Warroo Limestone Mbrs, Taemas	Spiriferida, Anaplothecidae	
Craniops	C. australis	Receptaculites & Warroo Limestone Mbrs, Taemas	Craniopsida, Craniopsidae	
Cydimia	C. parva	Receptaculites Limestone Mbr, Taemas	Terebratulida, Rhipidothyrididae	
Cydimia	C. robertsi	Receptaculites Limestone Mbr, Taemas	Terebratulida, Rhipidothyrididae	
Cyrtinopsis	C. aff. C. cooperi	Receptaculites Limestone Mbr, Taemas	Spiriferida, Spiriferidae	
Cyrtina	C. aff. C. wellingtonensis	Receptaculites & Warroo Limestone Mbrs, Taemas	Spiriferida, Cyrtinidae	
Cymostrophia	C. dickinsi	Receptaculites & Warroo Limestone Mbrs, Taemas	Strophomenida, Stropheodontidae	
Cymostrophia	C. multicostella	Receptaculites Limestone Mbr, Taemas	Strophomenida, Stropheodontidae	
Delthyris	D. hudsoni	Receptaculites & Warroo Limestone Mbrs, Taemas	Spiriferida, Delthyrididae	
Eoglossinotoechia	E. linki	Receptaculites & Warroo Limestone Mbrs, Taemas	Rhynchonellida, Uncinulidae	
Howellella	H. aff. H. textilis	Receptaculites Limestone Mbr, Taemas	Spiriferida, Spiriferidae	
Howittia	H. howitti	From Cavan up to Warroo Limestone Mbr, Taemas	Spiriferida, Spinocyrtiidae	
Howittia	H. multiplicata	From Cavan up to Receptaculites Limestone Mbr, Taemas	Spiriferida, Spinocyrtiidae	
Hysterolites	H. sp.	Receptaculites & Warroo Limestone Mbrs, Taemas	Spiriferida, Spiriferidae	
Isorthis	I. spedeni	Warroo Limestone Mbr, Taemas	Orthida, Dalmanellidae	
Leptostrophia	L. clarkei	Receptaculites & Warroo Limestone Mbrs, Taemas	Strophomenida, Stropheodontidae	
Malurostrophia	M. aura	Receptaculites Limestone Mbr, Taemas	Strophomenida, Stropheodontidae	
Malurostrophia	M. bella	Warroo Limestone Mbr, Taemas	Strophomenida, Stropheodontidae	
Malurostrophia	M. flabellicauda	Receptaculites Limestone Mbr, Taemas	Strophomenida, Stropheodontidae	
Malurostrophia	M. flabellicauda reverta	Receptaculites Limestone Mbr, Taemas	Strophomenida, Stropheodontidae	
Malurostrophia	M. minima	Receptaculites & Warroo Limestone Mbrs, Taemas	Strophomenida, Stropheodontidae	
Micidus	?M. glaber	Receptaculites Limestone Mbr, Taemas	Terebratulida, Mutationellidae	
Micidus	M. shandkyddi	Receptaculites & Warroo Limestone Mbrs, Taemas	Terebratulida, Mutationellidae	
Muriferella	M. hillae	Warroo Limestone Mbr, Taemas	Orthida, Schizophoriidae	
Parachonetes	P. flemingi	Receptaculites Limestone Mbr, Taemas	Strophomenida, Chonetidae	
Parachonetes	P. konincki	Receptaculites Limestone Mbr, Taemas	Strophomenida, Chonetidae	
Protochonetes	P. culleni	S. yassensis & Receptaculites Limestone Mbrs, Taemas	Strophomenida, Chonetidae	
Protochonetes	P. latus	Receptaculites & Warroo Limestone Mbrs, Taemas	Strophomenida, Chonetidae	
Pugnax	’P.’ oepiki	Receptaculites & Warroo Limestone Mbrs, Taemas	Rhynchonellida, Pugnacidae	
Resserella	R. careyi	Warroo Limestone Mbr, Taemas	Orthida, Dalmanellidae	
Salopina	S. kemezysi	Receptaculites Limestone Mbr, Taemas	Orthida, Schizophoriidae	
Septachonetes	S. melanus	Warroo Limestone Mbr, Taemas	Strophomenida, Chonetidae	
Schuchertella	S. murphyi	Receptaculites & Warroo Limestone Mbrs, Taemas	Strophomenida, Schuchertellidae	
Spinella	S. yassensis	S. yassensis & Receptaculites Limestone Mbrs, Taemas	Spiriferida, Spiriferidae	
Spinulicosta	S. campbelli	Receptaculites & Warroo Limestone Mbrs, Taemas	Strophomenida, Productellidae	
Taemostrophia	T. patmorei	Receptaculites & Warroo Limestone Mbrs, Taemas	Strophomenida, Stropheodontidae	
Quadrithyrina	Q. allani	Receptaculites Limestone Mbr, Taemas	Spiriferida, Spinocyrtiidae	

=== Gastropoda ===
Gastropods of the Murrumbidgee Group
Genus	Species	Horizon	Clade	Images
Arizonella	?A. conoidea	Receptaculites Limestone Mbr, Taemas	Gastropoda incertae sedis, Raphistomatidae	
Bembexia	B. micula	Receptaculites Limestone Mbr, Taemas	Pleurotomariida, Eotomariidae	
Bembexia	B. sp.	Receptaculites Limestone Mbr, Taemas	Pleurotomariida, Eotomariidae	
Coelocyclus	C. hadroni	Receptaculites Limestone Mbr, Taemas	Bellerophontida, Bellerophontidae	
Coelozone	?C. sp.	Receptaculites Limestone Mbr, Taemas	Pleurotomariida, Gosseletinidae	
Hemizyga	H. (Hyphantozyga) granifera	Receptaculites Limestone Mbr, Taemas	Caenogastropoda, Pseudozygopleuridae	
Hesperiella	H. sp.	Receptaculites Limestone Mbr, Taemas	Pleurotomariida, Eotomariidae	
Holopea	H. protoni	Receptaculites Limestone Mbr, Taemas	Vetigastropoda, Holopeidae	Specimens of the related H. praestans.
Ianthinopsis	I. ornatus	Receptaculites Limestone Mbr, Taemas	Caenogastropoda, Subulitidae	
Leptoptygma	L. australe	Receptaculites Limestone Mbr, Taemas	Caenogastropoda, Subulitidae	
Loxonema	L. altacostatum	Receptaculites Limestone Mbr, Taemas	Pleurotomariida, Loxonematidae	
Mesocoelia	M. quarki	Receptaculites Limestone Mbr, Taemas	Pleurotomariida, Murchisoniidae	
Michelia	M. darwini	Uncertain	Pleurotomariida, Murchisoniidae	
Mitchellia	M. striatula	Receptaculites Limestone Mbr, Taemas	Gastropoda incertae sedis, Codonocheilidae	
Mourlonia	M. subglobosa	Receptaculites Limestone Mbr, Taemas	Pleurotomariida, Eotomariidae	
Murchisonia	M. (M.) fermioni	Receptaculites Limestone Mbr, Taemas	Pleurotomariida, Murchisoniidae	
Murchisonia	M. (M.) turris	Receptaculites Limestone Mbr, Taemas	Pleurotomariida, Murchisoniidae	
Naticopsis	N. (N.) taemasensis	Receptaculites Limestone Mbr, Taemas	Cycloneritida, Neritopsidae	Specimen of the related Naticopsis sp.
Oehlertia	O. pioni	Receptaculites Limestone Mbr, Taemas	Pleurotomariida, Eotomariidae	
Palaeozygopleura	P. muoni	Receptaculites Limestone Mbr, Taemas	Pleurotomariida, Palaeozygopleuridae	
Platyceras	P. (P.) sp. A	Receptaculites Limestone Mbr, Taemas	Neritimorpha, Platyceratidae	
Platyceras	P. (P.) sp. B	Receptaculites Limestone Mbr, Taemas	Neritimorpha, Platyceratidae	
Ptychosphaera	P. convolutus	Receptaculites Limestone Mbr, Taemas	Bellerophontida, Bellerophontidae	
Retispira	R. retifera	Receptaculites Limestone Mbr, Taemas	Bellerophontida, Bellerophontidae	
Stegocoelia	S. (S.) bononi	Receptaculites Limestone Mbr, Taemas	Pleurotomariida, Murchisoniidae	
Straparollus	S. (Euomphalus) leptoni	Receptaculites Limestone Mbr, Taemas	Pleurotomariida, Euomphalidae	
Straparollus	?S. (Serpulospira) sp.	Receptaculites Limestone Mbr, Taemas	Pleurotomariida, Euomphalidae	
Subulites	S. (Fusispira) sp.	Uncertain	Caenogastropoda, Subulitidae	
Taemasotrochus	T. giganticus	Receptaculites Limestone Mbr, Taemas	Archaeogastropoda, Pseudophoridae	
Trochonema	?T. nodosa	Cave Flat Limestone	Trochonematoidea, Trochonematidae	Specimen of the related Trochonema sp. (Minnesota)
Trochonema	T. sp.	Receptaculites Limestone Mbr, Taemas	Trochonematoidea, Trochonematidae	Specimen of the related Trochonema sp. (Minnesota)
Tropidodiscus	T. centrifugalis	Receptaculites Limestone Mbr, Taemas	Bellerophontida, Bellerophontidae	
Umbotropis	U. mesoni	Receptaculites Limestone Mbr, Taemas	Pleurotomariida, Gosseletinidae	
Operculum gen. et.	sp. indet.	Receptaculites Limestone Mbr, Taemas	?Pleurotomariida, incertae sedis	

=== Trilobita ===
Trilobites of the Murrumbidgee Group
Genus	Species	Horizon	Clade	Images
Apocalymene	A. quadrilobata	S. yassensis Limestone Mbr, Taemas	Phacopida, Calymenidae	Fossil of G. arcuata.
Otarion	O. dabrowni	Receptaculites Limestone Mbr, Taemas	Proetida, Aulacopleuridae	
Phacops	P. spedeni	Receptaculites Limestone Mbr, Taemas	Phacopida, Phacopidae	Fossil of Phacops sp.
