= Buchan Group =

Group of geological units in Victoria, Australia

- Stratigraphic range: Early Devonian (Pragian-Emsian) 413.02–393.47 Ma
- Type: Geologic group
- Sub-units: Buchan Caves Limestone, Taravale Formation, Murrindal Limestone
- Overlies: Snowy River Volcanics
- Thickness: 700–1,100 m (2,300–3,600 ft)

Lithology
- Primary: Limestone
- Other: Mudstone, shale, marl (Taravale)

Location
- Location: Near Buchan, Victoria
- Coordinates: 37°29′44.88″S 148°9′47.16″E
- Region: Victoria
- Country: Australia
- Buchan Group (Australia) Buchan Group (Victoria)

The Buchan Group is a group of Early Devonian (Pragian–Emsian) aged strata located near Buchan, Victoria in Australia. It consists of three formations, the oldest unit being the Buchan Caves Limestone, then the Taravale Formation, and the youngest is the Murrindal Limestone, which comprises the members McLarty (McL) and Rocky Camp (ROC).

== Strata ==
As stated above, the Buchan Group is made up of three formations:

- Buchan Caves Limestone: The Buchan Caves Limestone consists of a dark-gray limestone, increasing fossiliferous from base to top. This represents the shift from peritidal, regular marine shelf to more open shelf and biohemal environments. The base of this formation represents a transitional period between the non-marine ecosystem of the Snowy River Volcanics, which underlie the Buchan Caves, and the peritidal deposits of the lower Buchan Caves Limestone.
- Taravale Formation: The Taravale Formation, with one sole primary bioherm in the south, is made up of mudstones, shales, marls and nodular limestone. Deposited in deep marine environments, these sediments document detrital influx and reduced carbonate production proportionately. The formation laterally and vertically grades into the Murrindal Limestone, which overlies it. A unit of the Taravale, the Pyramids Member, stretches beneth the Murrindal.
- Murrindal Limestone: The Murrindal Limestone, measuring up to 330 meters in thickness, is a shallowing-upward shelf to lagoonal sequence possessing plentiful bioherms and mounds. It represents a final transgression and final drowning of shallow-water communities, which ceased bioherm construction. This has resulted in the slope marl deposition of the Taravale Formation. It consists of two members:
  - McLarty Member (McL): The McLarty Member, the lower strata, possesses well-bedded limestones with a dark colouration, and possesses rich fossiliferous beds to the east, which is equivalent to a fore-reef facies, and to the west the beds are poorer in fossils and away from the bioherms.
  - Rocky Camp Member (ROC): The Rocky Camp Member, the upper strata, is a discontinuous, biohermal limestone unit with a thickness up to 600m, lies in the north of the basin and is paler in colouration, poorly-bedded, fossiliferous and is home to mud-mound facies. This site, which has been quarried, hosts the two southerly lens and has among the best exposures of sedimentary facies. There are two forms of accumulations which form the basis of the ROC, a small bioherm facies, and a mud-mound facies. The former, only <200m in diameter, is present north of the Rocky Camp and Dally's hills, and hosts thin units of fossiliferous, bioclastic and pelloidal grainstone to packstone which seems to be absent in stromatactis.

== Geology ==
Preserved in the Buchan-Murrindal Synclinorium, a north-trending basin, the Buchan Group was deposited in a marine environment. It is subdivided into three formations: Buchan Caves Limestone, Taravale Formation, and Murrindal Limestone. Within the Spring Creek Member, at the base of the Buchan Caves Limestone, is the transition from terrestrial volcanism to marine carbonate sedimentation. Overlying the Spring Creek Member is about 40 meters of heavily dolomitized limestone which harbour few recognizable fossils.

In the Buchan Caves Limestone, the upper portion shifts to increasing argillaceous (clay) until it becomes lime mudstone of the Pyramids Marlstone Member, the lowermost and overlying strata of the Taravale Formation. This marks a transition from an open-marine deposition to deeper water sedimentation. Within the northern region of the synclinorium, said deep-water sedimentation gives way to the more shallow marine deposition, which marks the Murrindal Limestone. A total thickness of 1,100 meters of the Buchan Group is preserved in the southern part of the synclinorium, while in the north it is closer to 700 meters.

In addition to numerous species of brachiopods and conodonts, the Buchan Group hosts several placoderm taxa, such as Arenipiscis and Buchanosteus, as well as the fish Ligulalepis, that are similar to those of the Murrumbidgee Group, another Early Devonian group of Burrinjuck, New South Wales. This indicates that the two strata were in the process of deposition at approximately the same time, and that these fish lived throughout the region.

== Vertebrates ==
=== Chondrichthyes ===
Chondrichthyans of the Buchan Group
Genus	Species	Strata	Clade	Images
Cheiracanthoides	C. sp. cf. C. comptus	Buchan Caves; Taravale; Murrindal	Climatiiformes, Climatiidae	
Cheiracanthoides	C. sp. cf. C. wangi	Taravale; Murrindal	Climatiiformes, Climatiidae	
Gomphonchus	?G. bongongensis	Buchan Caves; Taravale; Murrindal	Ischnacanthiformes, Ischnacanthidae	
Nostolepis	"N." guangxiensis	Buchan Caves; Taravale; Murrindal	Climatiiformes, Climatiidae	Reconstruction of Nostolepis.
Nostolepis	cf. N. sp.	Taravale	Climatiiformes, Climatiidae	Reconstruction of Nostolepis.
Nostolepoides	N. platymarginata	Buchan Caves; Taravale; Murrindal	Climatiiformes, Climatiidae	
Rhadinacanthus	?R. sp.	Buchan Caves; Murrindal	Diplacanthiformes, Diplacanthidae	

=== Conodonta ===
Conodonts of the Buchan Group
Genus	Species	Strata	Clade	Images
Belodella	B. sp. cf. B. devonica	Murrindal (McL & ROC)	Proconodontida, Belodellidae	
Belodella	B. resima	Buchan Caves; Murrindal (McL & ROC)	Proconodontida, Belodellidae	
Belodella	B. triangularis	Buchan Caves; Murrindal (McL & ROC)	Proconodontida, Belodellidae	
Drepanodus	D. A	Murrindal (McL)	Protopanderodontida, Distacodontidae	
Drepanodus	D. B	Murrindal (McL)	Protopanderodontida, Distacodontidae	
Eognathodus	E. linearis	Buchan Caves	Ozarkodinida, Polygnathacea incertae sedis	
Hindeodella	H. equidentala	Buchan Caves; Murrindal (McL & ROC)	Ozarkodinida, Coleodontidae	
Hindeodella	H. priscilla	Buchan Caves; Murrindal (McL & ROC)	Ozarkodinida, Coleodontidae	
Hindeodella	H. A	Murrindal (McL)	Ozarkodinida, Coleodontidae	
Hindeodella	H. B	Murrindal (ROC)	Ozarkodinida, Coleodontidae	
Lonchodina	L. murrindalensis	Murrindal (McL)	Ozarkodinida, Coleodontidae	
Lonchodina	L. sp.	Buchan Caves; Murrindal (McL)	Ozarkodinida, Coleodontidae	
Neoprioniodus	N. bicurvatus	Buchan Caves; Murrindal (McL & ROC)	Uncertain	
Ozarkodina	O. alternatus	Buchan Caves	Ozarkodinida, Spathognathodontidae	
Ozarkodina	O. extensus lacertosus	Murrindal (McL)	Ozarkodinida, Spathognathodontidae	
Ozarkodina	O. denckmanni	Buchan Caves; Murrindal (McL & ROC)	Ozarkodinida, Spathognathodontidae	
Ozarkodina	O. media	Murrindal (McL)	Ozarkodinida, Spathognathodontidae	
Ozarkodina	O. sp. cf. O. jageri	Buchan Caves	Ozarkodinida, Spathognathodontidae	
Ozarkodina	?O. sp.	Buchan Caves	Ozarkodinida, Spathognathodontidae	
Panderodus	P. acostatus	Buchan Caves; Murrindal (McL & ROC)	Panderodontida, Panderodontidae	Restoration of P. unicostatus.
Panderodus	P. unicostatus	Buchan Caves; Murrindal (McL & ROC)	Panderodontida, Panderodontidae	Restoration of P. unicostatus.
Panderodus	P. valgus	Buchan Caves; Murrindal (McL & ROC)	Panderodontida, Panderodontidae	Restoration of P. unicostatus.
Panderodus	P. sp. cf. P. recurvatus	Buchan Caves; Murrindal (McL)	Panderodontida, Panderodontidae	Restoration of P. unicostatus.
Plectodina	P. excavata	Murrindal (McL)	Uncertain	
Plectodina	P. inconstans	Buchan Caves; Murrindal (McL)	Uncertain	
Plectodina	P. symmetrica pinnula	Buchan Caves	Uncertain	
Plectodina	P. sp. cf. P. inconstans	Buchan Caves; Murrindal (McL)	Uncertain	
Plectodina	P. sp.	Buchan Caves	Uncertain	
Polygnathus	P. linguiformis	Taravale; Murrindal (McL & ROC)	Ozarkodinida, Polygnathidae	
Roundya	R. perbona	Murrindal (McL)	Conodonta, incertae sedis	
Spathognathodus	S. exiguus	Murrindal (McL)	Ozarkodinida, Spathognathodontidae	
Spathognathodus	S. inclinatus inclinatus	Murrindal (McL)	Ozarkodinida, Spathognathodontidae	
Spathognathodus	S. steinhornensis buchanensis	Buchan Caves; Taravale; Murrindal (McL & ROC)	Ozarkodinida, Spathognathodontidae	
Spathognathodus	S. sp.	Buchan Caves	Ozarkodinida, Spathognathodontidae	

=== Placodermi ===
Placoderms of the Buchan Group
Genus	Species	Strata	Clade	Images
Arenipiscis	A. westolli	Murrindal (?McL)	Arthrodira, Buchanosteidae	Restoration of A. westolli.
Buchanosteus	B. confertituberculatus	Unknown	Arthrodira, Buchanosteidae	B. confertituberculatus reconstruction.
Buchanosteus	B. sp.	Buchan Caves; Taravale; Murrindal	Arthrodira, Buchanosteidae	B. confertituberculatus reconstruction.
Errolosteus	cf. E. goodradigbeensis	Murrindal (McL)	Arthrodira, Buchanosteidae	E. goodradigbeensis reconstruction.
Goodradigbeeon	G. australianum	Buchan Caves; Taravale	Arthrodira, Buchanosteidae	A reconstruction of G. australianum.
Murrindalaspis	M. bairdi	Murrindal (ROC)	Acanthothoraci, Weejasperaspididae	Cropped image showing a restoration of M. wallacei.
Murrindalaspis	M. wallacei	Murrindal (McL)	Acanthothoraci, Weejasperaspididae	Cropped image showing a restoration of M. wallacei.
Murrindalaspis	M. sp.	Taravale	Acanthothoraci, Weejasperaspididae	Cropped image showing a restoration of M. wallacei.
Ohioaspis	O. sp.	Murrindal	Incertae sedis (Rhenanida?)	
Taemasosteus	T. maclartiensis	Murrindal (McL & ROC)	Arthrodira, Buchanosteidae	Restoration of T. novaustrocambricus.
Wijdeaspis	W. warrooensis	Murrindal (McL)	Petalichthyida, incertae sedis	
gen. indet.	sp. indet.	Murrindal (ROC)	Euarthrodira, incertae sedis	

=== Other ===
Other vertebrates of the Buchan Group
Genus	Species	Strata	Clade	Images
Ligulalepis	L. toombsi	Taravale	Osteichthyes, incertae sedis	Life reconstruction of L. toombsi, based on a skull.
Turinia	sp. cf. T. australiensis	Buchan Caves	Thelodontiformes, Turiniidae	Reconstruction of T. pagei.
gen. indet.	sp. indet.	Taravale; Murrindal	Onychodontiformes, incertae sedis	

== Invertebrates ==
=== Brachiopoda ===
Brachiopods of the Buchan Group
Genus	Species	Formation	Clade	Images
Ambocoelia	A. sp. aff. A. runnegari	Murrindal (McL)	Spiriferida, Ambocoeliidae	
Atryparia	A. penelopeae	Murrindal (McL & ROC)	Atrypida, Atrypidae	
Aulacella	A. philipi	Murrindal (McL & ROC)	Orthida, Rhipidomellidae	
Bidigitus	B. murrindalensis	Murrindal (McL & ROC)	Orthida, Dalmanellidae	
Biernatium	B. catastum	Murrindal (McL)	Orthida, Mystrophoridae	
Buchanathyris	B. westoni	Murrindal (McL & ROC)	Athyridida, Athyrididae	
Coelospira	C. dayi	Murrindal (McL)	Athyridida, Anoplothecidae	
Craniops	C. australis	Murrindal (McL & ROC)	Craniopsida, Craniopsidae	
Cymostrophia	C. (Protocymostrophia) dickinsi	Murrindal (McL & ROC)	Strophomenida, Douvillinidae	
Cyrtina	C. wellingtonensis	Murrindal (McL & ROC)	Spiriferinida, Cyrtinidae	
Delthyris	?D. sp.	Murrindal (McL)	Spiriferida, Delthyrididae	
Dolerorthis	D. sp.	Murrindal (McL & ROC)	Orthida, Hesperorthidae	Fossil of Dolerorthis.
Eoglossinotoechia	E. linki	Murrindal (McL & ROC)	Rhynchonellida, Glossinotoechiidae	
Eoschuchertella	E. murphyi	Murrindal (McL & ROC)	Orthotetida, Areostrophiidae	
gen. indet.	sp. indet.	Murrindal (ROC)	Orthida, Hesperorthidae	
Howellella	H. (H.) textilis	Murrindal (McL & ROC)	Spiriferida, Delthyrididae	
Howittia	H. howitti	Murrindal (McL & ROC)	Spiriferida, Cyrtinopsidae	
Johnsonetes	J. australis	Murrindal (McL & ROC)	Productida, Strophochonetidae	
Johnsonetes	J. sp. cf. J. culleni	Murrindal (ROC)	Productida, Strophochonetidae	
Malurostrophia	M. sp. cf. M. flabellicauda	Murrindal (McL & ROC)	Strophomenida, Douvillinidae	
Mesoleptostrophia	M. (Paraleptostrophia) clarkei	Murrindal (McL & ROC)	Strophomenida, Leptostrophiidae	
Micidus	?M. glaber	Murrindal (McL & ROC)	Terebratulida, Meganteridae	
Micidus	M. shandkyddi	Murrindal (McL & ROC)	Terebratulida, Meganteridae	
Nadiastrophia	N. patmorei	Murrindal (McL & ROC)	Strophomenida, Douvillinidae	
Notoleptaena	N. adamantea	Murrindal (McL & ROC)	Strophomenida, Rafinesquinidae	
Nucleospira	N. sp.	Murrindal (McL)	Athyridida, Nucleospiridae	
Opsiconidion	O. arcticon	Murrindal (ROC)	Acrotretida, Biernatidae	
Opsiconidion	O. sp. cf. O. aldridgei	Murrindal (ROC)	Acrotretida, Biernatidae	
Prokopia	P. hillae	Murrindal (McL & ROC)	Orthida, Dalmanellidae	
Pugnax	‘P.’ oepiki	Murrindal (McL & ROC)	Rhynchonellida, Pugnacidae	
Resserella	R. careyi	Murrindal (McL & ROC)	Orthida, Dalmanellidae	
Spinella	S. buchanensis buchanensis	Murrindal (McL & ROC)	Spiriferida, Spinellidae	
Spinella	S. yassensis	Murrindal (McL & ROC)	Spiriferida, Spinellidae	
Tyersella	T. spedeni	Murrindal (McL & ROC)	Orthida, Dalmanellidae	
Variatrypa	V. (V.) erectirostris	Murrindal (McL & ROC)	Atrypida, Atrypidae	

=== Rugosa ===
Rugose corals of the Buchan Group
Genus	Species	Strata	Clade	Images
Acanthophyllum	A. aequiseptatum	Buchan Caves	Rugosa, Acanthophyllidae	
Acanthophyllum	A. aff. clermontense	Murrindal (ROC)	Rugosa, Acanthophyllidae	
Acanthophyllum	A. sp.	Buchan Caves	Rugosa, Acanthophyllidae	
Campophyllum	'C.' recessum	Buchan Caves	Rugosa, Caniniidae	
Disphyllum	D. angulare	Murrindal (McL)	Rugosa, Disphyllidae	
Disphyllum	D. speleanum	Buchan Caves	Rugosa, Disphyllidae	
Lyrielasma	L. aff. floriforme	Murrindal	Rugosa, Acanthophyllidae	
Metriophyllum	M. erisma	Murrindal (McL)	Rugosa, Metriophyllidae	
Pseudamplexus	P. ?princeps	Buchan Caves	Rugosa, Mucophyllidae	
Spongophyllum	S. murale	Murrindal (McL) (uncertain)	Rugosa, Spongophyllidae	
Syringaxon	S. radiatum	Murrindal (McL)	Rugosa, Syringaxonidae	
Xystriphyllum	X. mitchelli	Murrindal (ROC)	Rugosa, Acanthophyllidae	

=== Stromatoporoidea ===
Stromatoporoids of the Buchan Group
Genus	Species	Strata	Clade	Images
Actinostroma	A. compactum	Buchan Caves; Murrindal (ROC)		
Actinostroma	A. contortum	Buchan Caves; Murrindal (ROC)		
Actinostroma	A. stellulatum var. distans	Buchan Caves		
Clathrodictyon	C. clarum	Buchan Caves; Murrindal (ROC)		
Clathrodictyon	C. confertum	Buchan Caves		
Clathrodictyon	C. convictum	Buchan Caves		
Clathrodictyon	C. convictum var. delicatula	Buchan Caves; Murrindal (ROC)		
Clathrodictyon	C. regulare	Buchan Caves		
Hermatostroma	H. episcopale	Buchan Caves		
Hermatostroma	H. episcopale var. buchanensis			
Stromatopora	S. aff. S. foveolata	Murrindal (ROC)		
Stromatopora	S. concentrica	Buchan Caves; Murrindal (ROC)		
Stromatopora	S. concentrica var. colliculata	Buchan Caves; Murrindal (ROC)		
Stromatopora	S. hupschii	Murrindal (ROC)		

=== Tabulata ===
Tabulate corals of the Buchan Group
Genus	Species	Strata	Clade	Images
Alveolites	A. stamineus	Murrindal	Tabulata, Alveolitidae	
Alveolites	A. sp.	Murrindal (ROC)	Tabulata, Alveolitidae	
Aulopora	A. cf. conglomerata	Buchan Caves	Tabulata, Auloporidae	Specimen of A. sp.
Coenites	'C.' expansus	Murrindal (ROC)	Tabulata, Coenitidae	Specimen of the related Coenites laqueata.
Favosites	F. bryani	Unknown	Tabulata, Favositidae	Specimen of F. sp.
Favosites	F. nitidus	Murrindal (ROC)	Tabulata, Favositidae	Specimen of F. sp.
Favosites	F. pluteus	Murrindal (ROC)	Tabulata, Favositidae	Specimen of F. sp.
Favosites	F. stelliformis	Unknown	Tabulata, Favositidae	Specimen of F. sp.
Gephuropora	G. duni	Murrindal	Tabulata, Favositidae	
~~Ligulodictyum~~ Pleurodictyum	P. sp.	Taravale	Tabulata, Favositidae	Specimen of the related P. americanum.
Roemeria	R. ocellata	Murrindal (ROC)	Tabulata, Syringoporidae	
Roemeria	R. sp.	Buchan Caves	Tabulata, Syringoporidae	
Syringopora	S. flaccida	Buchan Caves	Tabulata, Syringoporidae	Specimen of S. sp.
Syringopora	S. sp.	Murrindal (ROC)	Tabulata, Syringoporidae	Specimen of S. sp.
Thamnopora	T. alterivalis	Buchan Caves; Murrindal (McL)	Tabulata, Favositidae	
Thamnopora	T. angulata	Murrindal (ROC)	Tabulata, Favositidae	
Thamnopora	T. tumulosa	Murrindal (McL)	Tabulata, Favositidae	
