= Dhanguura =

Dhanguura Temporal range: Early Devonian

Scientific classification
- Kingdom: Animalia
- Phylum: Chordata
- Class: †Placodermi
- Order: †Arthrodira
- Suborder: †Brachythoraci
- Genus: †Dhanguura; Johnston, 1993
- Species: †D. johnstoni

Binomial name
- †Dhanguura johnstoni Johnston, 1993

Extinct genus of fish

Dhanguura is an extinct genus of arthrodire from the Early Devonian of the Murrumbidgee Group in New South Wales, Australia. It contains the single species D. johnstoni.

== Etymology ==
Dhanguura comes from the Aboriginal word "dhanguurr", meaning "fish", in the Wiradjuri tribe's language, because they inhabited the area, west of Wee Jasper. The species name, "johnstoni" is in honor of the discoverer of the genus, Dr. Paul Johnston, who found Dhanguura in 1993.

== Description ==
Dhanguura is known from fossilized remains of an incomplete skull, the nuchal plate 23 cm in length, and the entire headshield estimated at 40 cm. According to the article cited, Dhanguura probably exceeded the contemporary Taemasosteus in size.

== Taxonomy ==
Dhanguura was thought to be a member of Homostiidae, according to Young, 2004, but a phylogenetic analyses by Zhu et al. 2015, does not support this, with Dhanguura now considered a basal brachythoracid.

- Elvaspis tuberculata
- Dicksonosteus arcticus
- Turrisaspis elektor
- Groenlandaspis antarcticus
- Holonema westolli
- Brachythoraci
  - Homostiidae
    - Homostius sulcatus
    - Antineosteus lehmani
  - - Buchanosteoidea
      - Buchanosteus confertituberculatus
      - Goodradigbeeon australianum
      - Parabuchanosteus murrumbidgeeni
    - - Dhanguura johnstoni
      - - Gemuendenaspis angusta
        - - Xiangshuiosteus wui
          - Eubrachythoraci
