= Richardosteus =

Richardosteus Temporal range: Emsian

Scientific classification
- Kingdom: Animalia
- Phylum: Chordata
- Class: †Placodermi
- Order: †Arthrodira
- Suborder: †Brachythoraci
- Family: †Buchanosteidae
- Genus: †Richardosteus; Long et al., 2014
- Species: †R. barwickorum

Binomial name
- †Richardosteus barwickorum (Long et al., 2014)

Extinct genus of fishes

Richardosteus is a monospecific genus of buchanosteid placoderm from Emsian strata of the Murrumbidgee Group, located in what is now New South Wales, Australia. It was described in 2014 from previously indeterminate buchanosteid remains. It is known only from two cranial specimens; the holotype ANU 71687, a partial head shield, and ANU 21804, an incomplete skull with attached fragments of the braincase.
