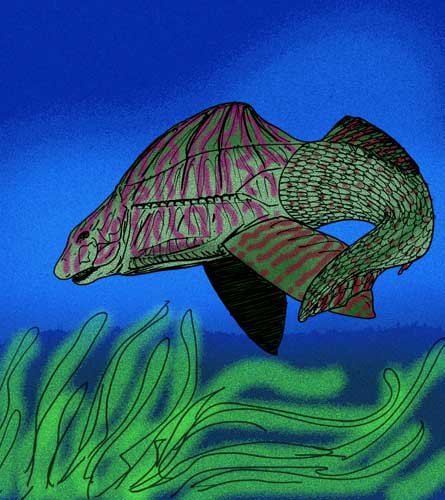

Scientific classification
- Kingdom: Animalia
- Phylum: Chordata
- Class: †Placodermi
- Order: †Arthrodira
- Suborder: †Brachythoraci
- Family: †Holonematidae
- Genus: †Tropidosteus; Gross, 1933
- Species: †T. curvatus

Binomial name
- †Tropidosteus curvatus Gross, 1933

= Tropidosteus =

Tropidosteus Temporal range: Givetian

Tropidosteus curvatus is a large, extinct holonematid arthrodire placoderm from the Givetian-aged Crinoidenmergel stratum of Middle Devonian Rheinland, Germany. T. curvatus is known from primarily from a slender, 42 centimeter long, arched median dorsal plate, where the two sides meet at a sixty to ninety degree angle, which would have given the live animal a humped appearance. The median dorsal plate is very similar to the median dorsal plates of Rhenonema and Belemnacanthus, and is the primary reason for T. curvatus' placement within Holonematidae. After stating this reason, Denison, 1978, then questions Tropidosteus' placement within the family, noting that the dorsal plate lacks ridged ornamentation, which is a key diagnostic trait of the family. The ornamentation otherwise consists of an external covering of small tubercles.
