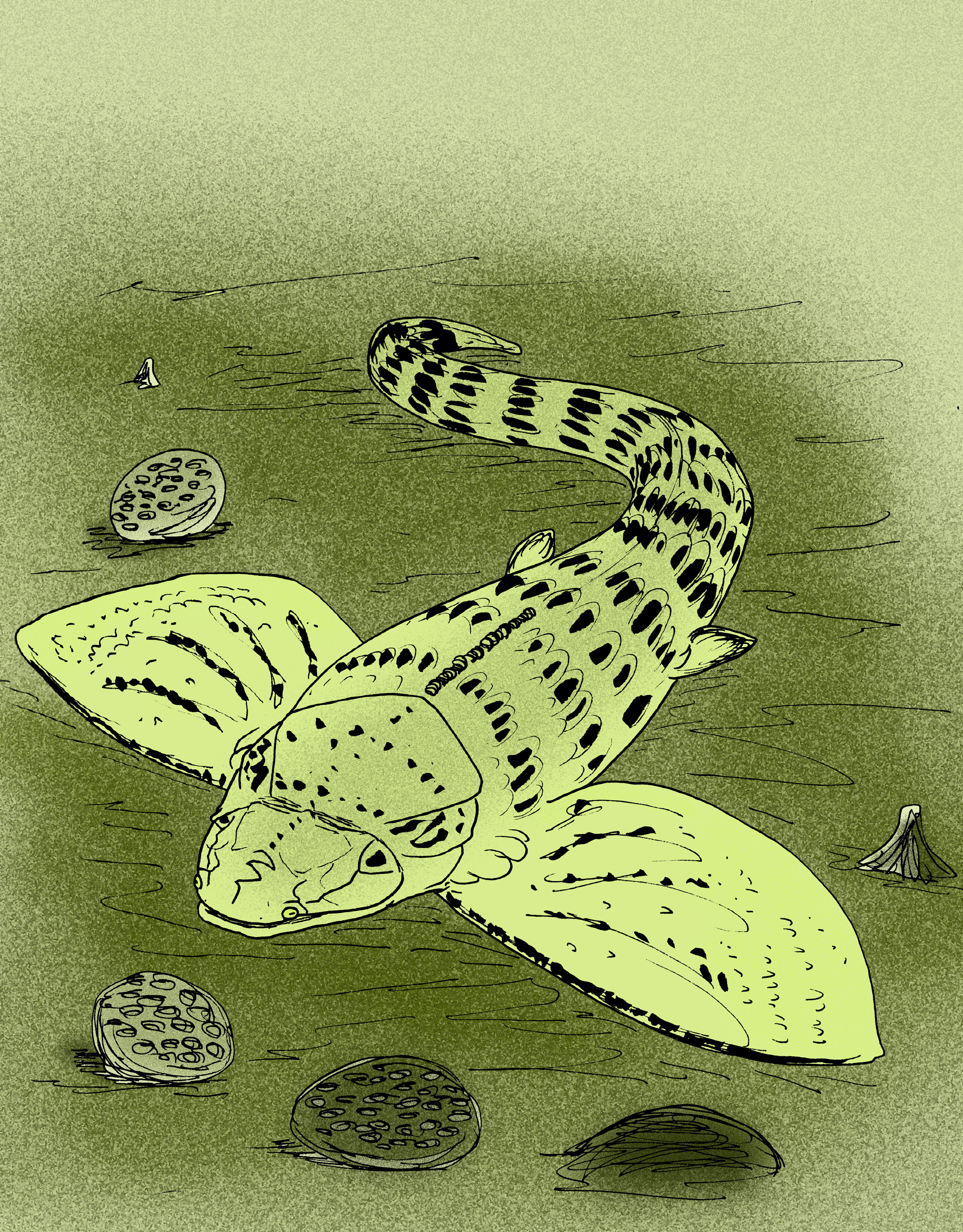
- Artist's reconstruction

Scientific classification
- Kingdom: Animalia
- Phylum: Chordata
- Class: †Placodermi
- Order: †Arthrodira
- Suborder: †Brachythoraci
- Family: †Buchanosteidae
- Genus: †Burrinjucosteus; White, 1978
- Species: †B. asymmetricus

Binomial name
- †Burrinjucosteus asymmetricus White, 1978

= Burrinjucosteus =

Burrinjucosteus Temporal range: Emsian

Extinct genus of fishes

Burrinjucosteus asymmetricus is an extinct buchanosteid arthrodire placoderm. Its fossils have been found in Emsian-aged marine strata of the Murrumbidgee Group in New South Wales, Australia.

Burrinjucosteus asymmetricus is known from scraps of thoracic armor and the skullroof, which suggest a very large, flat animal.
