= Exutaspis =

Exutaspis Temporal range: Emsian

Scientific classification
- Kingdom: Animalia
- Phylum: Chordata
- Class: †Placodermi
- Order: †Arthrodira
- Suborder: †Brachythoraci
- Family: †Buchanosteidae
- Genus: †Exutaspis; Liu & Wang, 1981
- Species: †E. megista

Binomial name
- †Exutaspis megista Liu & Wang, 1981

Exutaspis megista is an extinct, "giant" buchanosteid arthrodire placoderm. Its fossils have been found in the Late Emsian-aged marine strata of the Jiucheng and Haikou Formations in Wuding, Yunnan.

It was originally described as a phlyctaeniid. Later, after comparison with the Chinese Buchanosteus guanxianesis, Exutaspis was reappraised as a buchanosteid. The holotype, a "head roof," is 21 cm (8.3 in) long.
