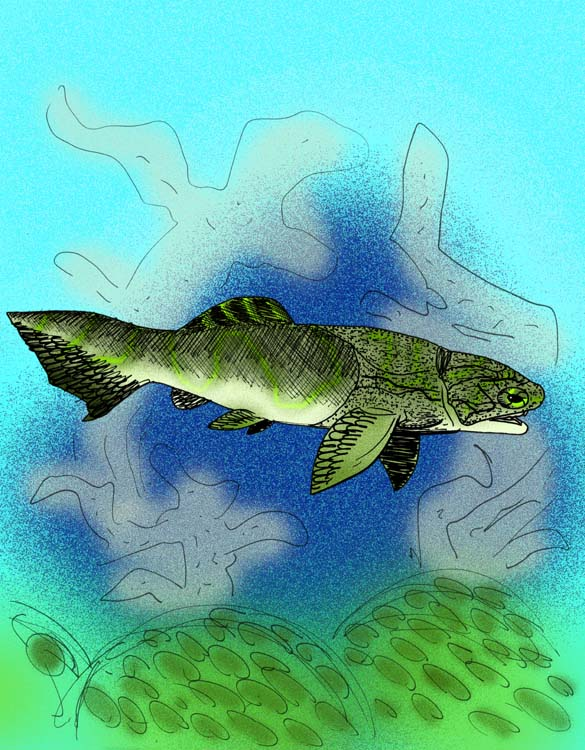
- Artist's reconstruction

Scientific classification
- Kingdom: Animalia
- Phylum: Chordata
- Class: †Placodermi
- Order: †Arthrodira
- Suborder: †Brachythoraci
- Family: †Buchanosteidae
- Genus: †Errolosteus; Young, 1981
- Species: †E. goodradigbeensis

Binomial name
- †Errolosteus goodradigbeensis Young, 1981

= Errolosteus =

Errolosteus Temporal range: Emsian

Extinct genus of arthrodire placoderm fishes

Errolosteus goodradigbeensis is an extinct buchanosteid arthrodire placoderm. Its fossils have been found in Emsian-aged marine strata of the Murrumbidgee Group in New South Wales, Australia.

The holotype of E. goodradigbeensis, ANU 21806, was described at the same time as its sympatric relative, Arenipiscis. Errolosteus can be distinguished by having a comparatively short, broad skull.
