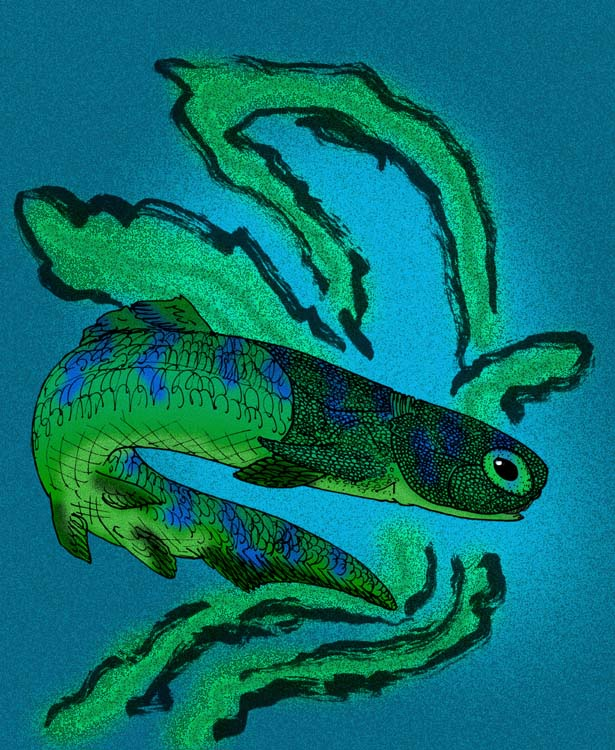
- Artist's reconstruction

Scientific classification
- Kingdom: Animalia
- Phylum: Chordata
- Class: †Placodermi
- Order: †Arthrodira
- Suborder: †Brachythoraci
- Family: †Buchanosteidae
- Genus: †Narrominaspis; Burrow, 2006
- Species: †N. longi

Binomial name
- †Narrominaspis longi Burrow, 2006

= Narrominaspis =

Narrominaspis Temporal range: Emsian

Narrominaspis longi is an extinct buchanosteid arthrodire placoderm. Its fossils, and those of the acanthothoracid, Connemarraspis, have been found in the late Lochkovian-aged marine strata of the Connemarra Formation in Australia.

It is considered a basal buchanosteid.
