= Wijdeaspis =

Wijdeaspis Temporal range: Early Devonian (Emsian)

Scientific classification
- Kingdom: Animalia
- Phylum: Chordata
- Class: †Placodermi
- Order: †Petalichthyida
- Genus: †Wijdeaspis; Obruchev, 1964

Type species
- Wijdeaspis arcticus Obruchev, 1964

Species
- Wijdeaspis arcticus (type) Obruchev, 1964; Wijdeaspis warrooensis Young, 1978

Genus of extinct fish

Wijdeaspis is a genus of petalichthyid placoderm from the Emsian stage of the Early Devonian epoch. Fossils of the species, W. warrooensis, have been found in the Taemas Formation (where it was originally found) of the Murrumbidgee Group in New South Wales, and the Buchan Group of Victoria, Australia., while the type species W. arcticus is known from the Grey Hoek Formation in Spitsbergen, Norway.

The relatively high number of ornamental ridges (9–10), and their arrangement in rows of fine, discrete tubercles closely packed on its spinal plate, are two of the main identifiable characteristics of Wijdeaspis. This is differentiated from those of Lunaspis, a close relative whose fossils are also known from the Murrumbidgee Group, which possesses very small tubercles that have been fused into fine, concretic crests, as well as its tubercles having less individuality than those of Wijdeaspis.
