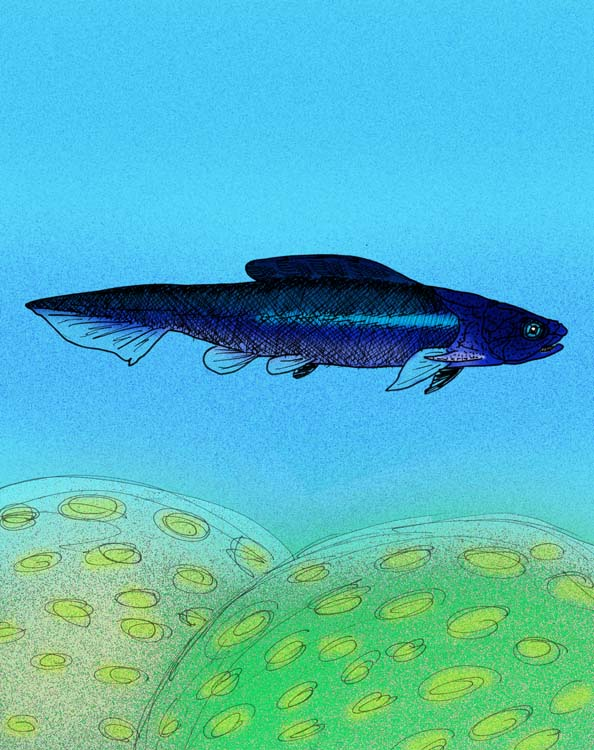
- An artist's impression of Parabuchanosteus murrumbidgeensis

Scientific classification
- Kingdom: Animalia
- Phylum: Chordata
- Class: †Placodermi
- Order: †Arthrodira
- Suborder: †Brachythoraci
- Family: †Buchanosteidae
- Genus: †Parabuchanosteus; White & Toombs, 1972
- Species: †P. murrumbidgeensis

Binomial name
- †Parabuchanosteus murrumbidgeensis (White, 1952)

Synonyms
- Buchanosteus murrumbidgeensis White, 1952

= Parabuchanosteus =

Parabuchanosteus Temporal range: Emsian

Extinct genus of fishes

Parabuchanosteus murrumbidgeensis is an extinct buchanosteid arthrodire placoderm. Its fossils have been found in the Late Emsian-aged marine strata of the Murrumbidgee Group in New South Wales, Australia.

It was originally described as Buchanosteus murrumbidgeensis in 1952. In 1972, it was re-examined and promoted to a new genus.
