= Victoria Point =

Victoria Point may refer to:

- Victoria Point, Queensland, a suburb of Redland City, Australia
- Victoria Point (building), a 42-storey residential tower in Melbourne Docklands, Australia
- The southernmost tip of Tanintharyi Division (formerly Tenassarim), Myanmar, now known as Kawthaung
