= Elvaspis =

Elvaspis Temporal range: Early Devonian (Emsian)

Scientific classification
- Kingdom: Animalia
- Phylum: Chordata
- Class: †Placodermi
- Order: †Arthrodira
- Clade: †Phlyctaenioidei
- Genus: †Elvaspis; Young, 2009

Species
- Elvaspis tuberculata Young, 2009 (type); Elvaspis whitei Young, 2009

Genus of extinct fish

Elvaspis is a genus of williamsaspid arthrodires from Early Devonian (Emsian) strata of the Murrumbidgee Group, New South Wales in Australia. Its name comes from the letters 'El' for 'Elga' and 'Va' for 'Valya', recognizing the role of Baltic paleontologists Elga Mark-Kurik and Valentina Karatajūtė-Talimaa in their contributions to Paleozoic fish research.

The holotype ANU V2387 of E. tuberculata was first discovered in 1988 during a student field excursion at the Caravan Point locality, hailing from a horizon likely within the upper part of the Bloomfield Limestone Member of the Taemas Limestone.

As a member of the small, deep-bodied Williamsaspidae, Elvaspis had a similar body cross-section to modern boxfishes. It is suggested that the animal maneuvered around coral like modern Ostracion, although since skull and jaw bones are currently unknown, inferences about their diet cannot be made.
