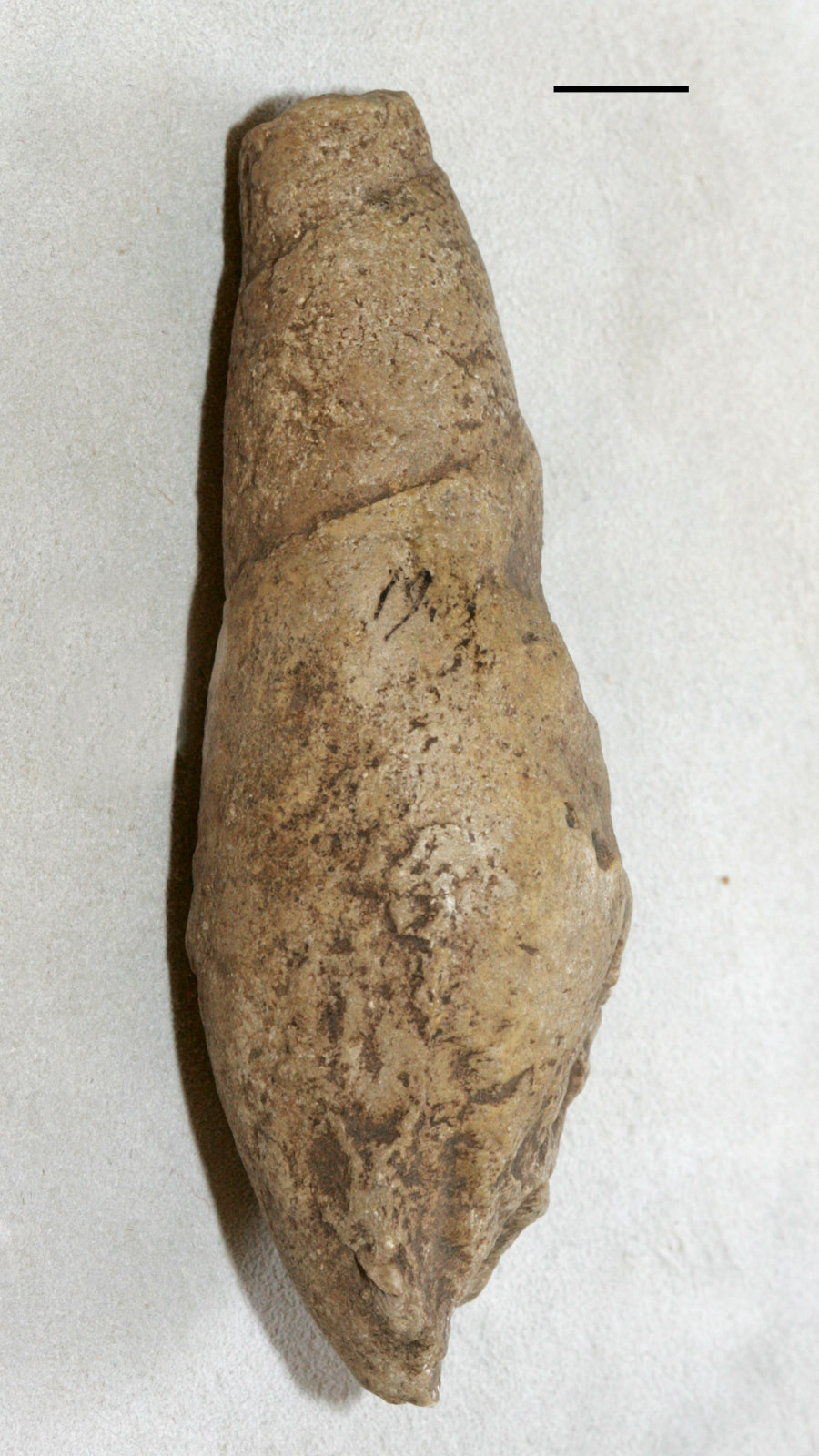
- Subulites gigas specimen collected from limestones of the Upper-Ordovician Nabala Stage, Saaremõisa, Estonia

Scientific classification
- Domain: Eukaryota
- Kingdom: Animalia
- Phylum: Mollusca
- Class: Gastropoda
- Subclass: Caenogastropoda
- Order: †Subulitoidea
- Family: †Soleniscidae
- Genus: †Subulites

= Subulites =

Subulites Temporal range: Early Ordovician–Mid Ordovician

Extinct genus of gastropods

Subulites is a genus of fossil sea snails, mud-dwelling marine gastropod mollusks known from the early-middle Ordovician, apparently allied with the Caenogastropoda. They can be identified by their two whorls.
