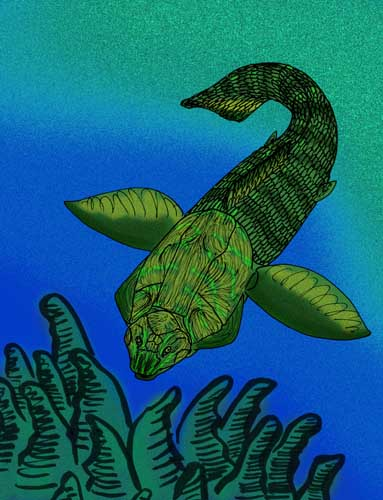
- Holonema rugosum

Scientific classification
- Kingdom: Animalia
- Phylum: Chordata
- Class: †Placodermi
- Order: †Arthrodira
- Suborder: †Brachythoraci
- Family: †Holonematidae; Obruchev, 1932

Type species
- Pterichthys rugosum Claypole, 1883

Genera
- Artesonema Lelièvre & Goujet, 1986; Belemnacanthus Eastman, 1898; Bimbianga Young, 2005; Deirosteus Wells, 1942; Deveonema Kulczycki, 1957; Gyroplacosteus Obruchev, 1932; Holonema Newberry, 1889; Rhenonema Obruchev, 1964; Tropidosteus Gross, 1933

= Holonematidae =

Holonematidae Temporal range: ?Emsian to Frasnian

Extinct family of fishes

Holonematidae is an extinct family of relatively large arthrodire placoderms from the Early to Late Devonian. Almost all fossil specimens are of armor fragments, though, all have distinctive ornamentation, often of unique arrangements and patterns of tubercles, that are diagnostic of the family. The trunkshield is very elongated, giving the armor an overall "barrel" like appearance.

Due to pebbles found inside articulated specimens of the Frasnian species, Holonema westolli, holonematids are thought to have been specialized herbivores that grazed on a form of horn-shaped, stony algae called "onycholite," snipping off the tips with their odd snouts.

== Genera ==
=== Artesonema ===
A poorly known genus from the Givetian-aged Blacourt Formation of Boulonnais, France. The holotype of Artesonema is an anterodorsolateral plate from an adult that has an ornamentation of tubercles normally characteristic of juvenile holonematids.

=== Belemnacanthus ===
Belemnacanthus is from the Givetian of Eifel, Germany. It has been previously described as being an elasmobranch, an agnathan, and an antiarch. The genus is known only from the holotype: a 37 cm long portion of a median dorsal plate, suggesting a very large animal. The median dorsal plate has a long crest running down the median of the dorsal surface. The outer surface has an ornamentation of long ridges radiating from a point beyond the preserved portions.

=== Bimbianga ===
If Bimbianga is a holonematid, then it is the earliest genus, dating from the Emsian-aged Murrumbidgee Group of Wee Jasper, New South Wales. Bimianga's placement within Holonematidae is questionable, as the morphology of its plates and ornamentation are very similar to those of the arthrodire incertae sedis Aspidichthys.

=== Deirosteus ===
Deirosteus is another poorly known genus. The ornamentation consists of acute ridges between broad interspaces often decorated with large tubercles. The genus is very similar to Holonema, and it is hard to distinguish between the two. Fossils are known from the Frasnian of New York, and possibly Iran, and from the Givetian of Estonia, Russia and Belgium.

=== Deveonema ===
Deveonema is known from a fragmentary median dorsal plate from Frasnian-aged strata within the Holy Cross Mountains of Poland. The median dorsal suggests a very small holonematid. The dermal surface is ornamented with a pattern of small tubercles, usually separate but sometimes in clumps of two or three. Along the center, the tubercles are arranged in longitudinal rows.

=== Gyroplacosteus ===
Gyroplacosteus is a genus known from various Frasnian deposits throughout Eastern Europe. The ornamentation is formed from coarse tubercles that are often fused together as sinuous ridges in various, usually complicated patterns.

=== Holonema ===
Holonema is the best known genus, as at least one species, H. westolli, is known from complete, articulated specimens. Holonema is also the most widespread genus, as the various species are found in Eifelian to Frasnian-aged deposits in the United States, Scotland, Europe, Western Asia, and Australia. The typical ornamentation consists of patterns of alternating rows of tubercles and ridges, with narrow interspaces.

=== Megaloplax ===
Megaloplax is a genus based on an incomplete median dorsal plate from Frasnian-aged deposits in the Ural Mountains.

=== Rhenonema ===
Rhenonema has a high crest along the median ridge of its median dorsal plate. The few fragments of armor are from Givetian-aged strata in Gerolstein, Germany.

=== Tropidosteus ===
Tropidosteus is a genus known from the Givetian-aged Crinoidenmergel of the Rheinland. The median dorsal plate has a large, hump-like arch. Because it lacks ornamentation along the median edge of the median dorsal, Denison 1978 questions its placement within Holonematidae (as all other genera with known median dorsals have ornamentation along the median edge). Otherwise, the dermal surface is covered in very small tubercles.

== Bibliography ==
- Denison, Robert (1978). Placodermi Volume 2 of Handbook of Paleoichthyology'. Stuttgart New York: Gustav Fischer Verlag. p. 60. ISBN 978-0-89574-027-4.
- Case, Gerald Ramon. A Pictorial Guide to Fossils
- Long, John. Swimming In Stone
