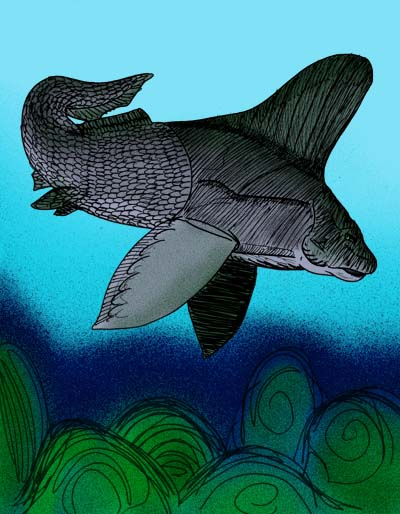

Scientific classification
- Kingdom: Animalia
- Phylum: Chordata
- Class: †Placodermi
- Order: †Arthrodira
- Suborder: †Brachythoraci
- Family: †Holonematidae
- Genus: †Rhenonema; Obruchev, 1964
- Species: †R. eifeliense

Binomial name
- †Rhenonema eifeliense (Kayser, 1880)

Synonyms
- Dinichthys eifeliense Kayser, 1880

= Rhenonema =

Rhenonema Temporal range: Givetian

Extinct genus of fishes

Rhenonema eifeliense ("Rheinland thread of Eifel") is a large, extinct, high-crested holonematid arthrodire placoderm from Givetian-aged strata of Middle Devonian Gerolstein, Germany. It is known from some fragments of armor, including an anterior-lateral plate estimated to be around 24 centimetres (9.4 in) long, and a portion of a median dorsal plate with a very tall crest running along the median line of the dorsal surface. The ornamentation is very similar to that of Holonema, but the concentrically arranged ridges are much coarser in Rhenonema. The holotype was originally described by Kayser, in 1880, as a species of Dinichthys, but was then redescribed in 1964 by Obruchev as a holonematid.
