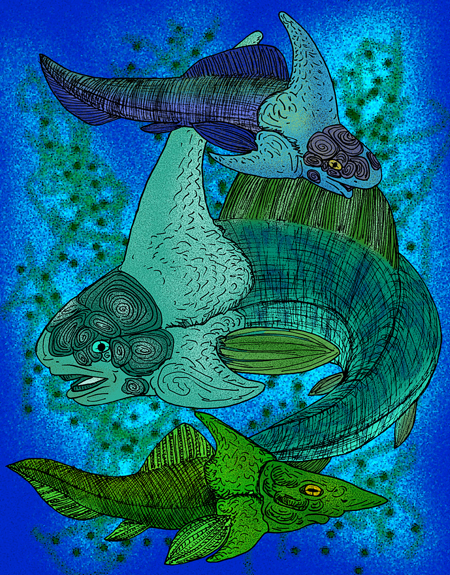
- Weejasperaspis gavini, Murrindalaspis wallacei & Brindabellaspis stensioi

Scientific classification
- Kingdom: Animalia
- Phylum: Chordata
- Class: †Placodermi
- Order: †Acanthothoraci
- Family: †Weejasperaspididae
- Genus: †Weejasperaspis; White, 1978
- Species: †W. gavini

Binomial name
- †Weejasperaspis gavini White, 1978

= Weejasperaspis =

Weejasperaspis Temporal range: Early Devonian

Extinct genus of fishes

Weejasperaspis is an extinct acanthothoracid placoderm found in the Wee Jasper reef, of the Early Devonian-aged Murrumbidgee Group in eastern New South Wales, Australia and the type species is W. gavini. Weejasperaspis differs from other acanthothoracids in that the median dorsal crest is short, and triangular-shaped. Its sister genus, Murrindalaspis, differs from it by having large, blade-like median dorsal crests that are recurved. Like Murrindalaspis, it is only known from a dorsal plate and ossified eyeballs.
