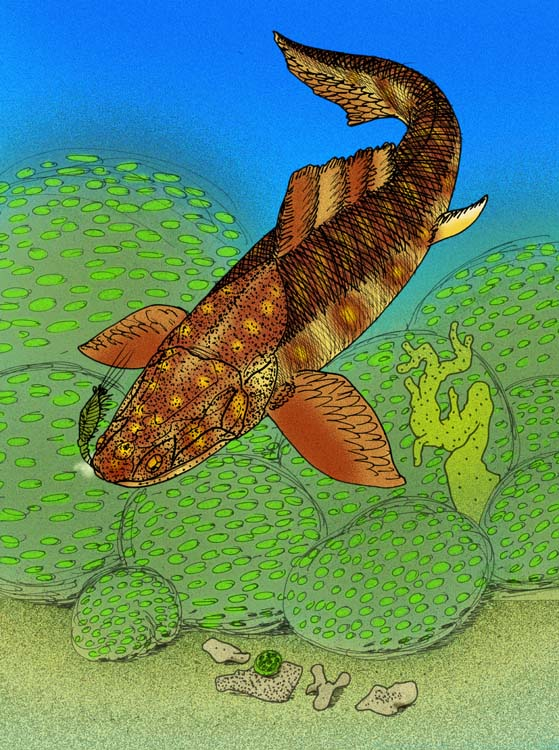
- Reconstruction of T. novaustrocambricus

Scientific classification
- Kingdom: Animalia
- Phylum: Chordata
- Class: †Placodermi
- Order: †Arthrodira
- Suborder: †Brachythoraci
- Family: †Buchanosteidae
- Genus: †Taemasosteus; White, 1952

Type species
- Taemasosteus novaustrocambricus White, 1952

Species
- T. novaustrocambricus White, 1952; T. maclartiensis

= Taemasosteus =

Taemasosteus Temporal range: Emsian

Extinct genus of fishes

Taemasosteus is an extinct genus of arthrodire placoderm. Its fossils have been found in Emsian-aged marine strata in the Murrumbidgee Group in New South Wales, Australia. It contains two species, T. novaustrocambricus, and T. maclartiensis.

The genus (and a monotypic family, "Taemasosteidae") was originally erected on the basis of "an imperfect" left paranuchal plate, though more specimens were found, eventually leading "Taemasosteidae" to be subsumed into Buchanosteidae.
