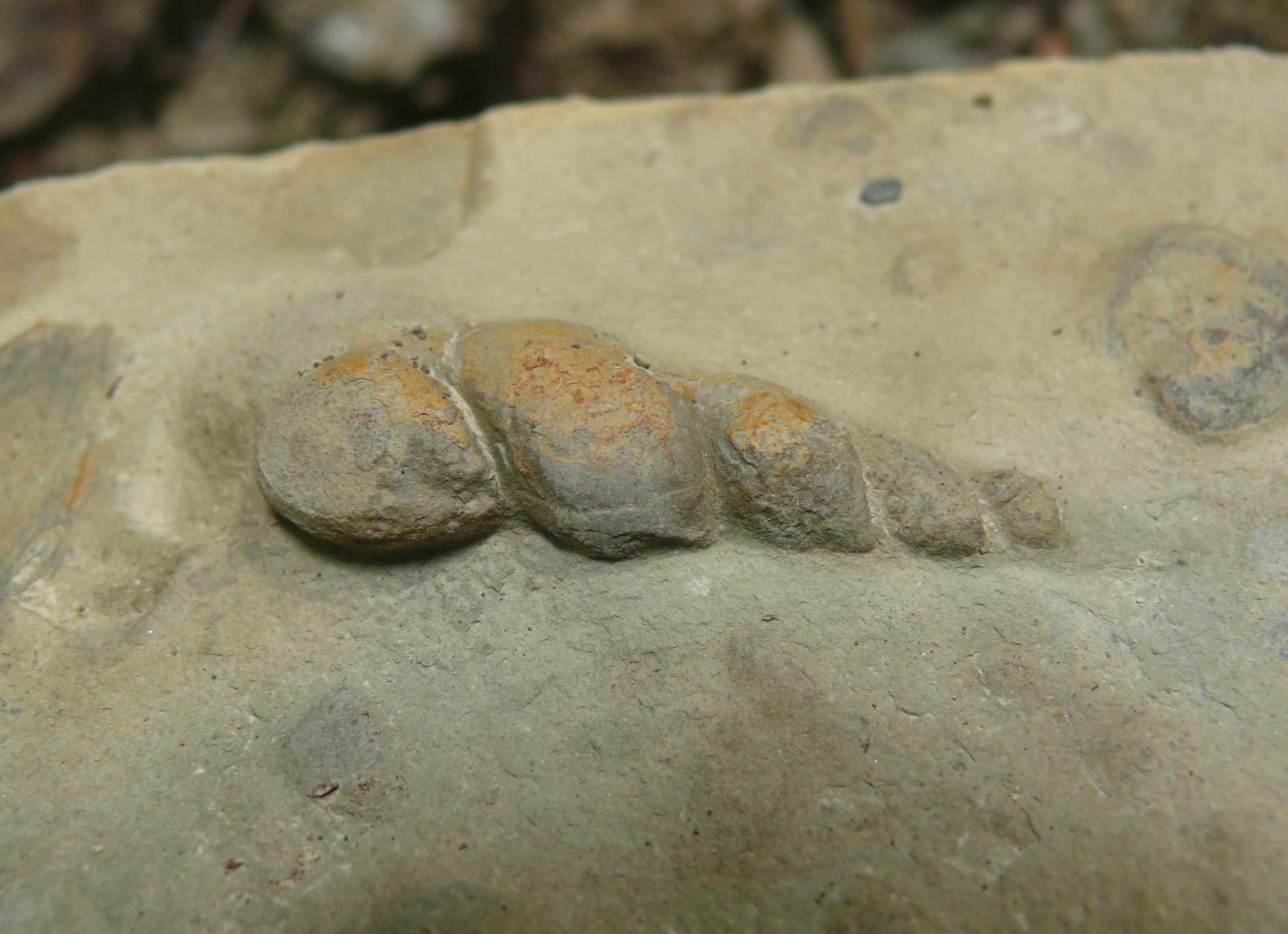
- Loxonema sp.

Scientific classification
- Kingdom: Animalia
- Phylum: Mollusca
- Class: Gastropoda
- Subclass: Vetigastropoda
- Order: Pleurotomariida
- Suborder: †Murchisoniina
- Superfamily: †Loxonematoidea; Koken, 1889

Families
- † Loxonematidae; † Palaeozygopleuridae

= Loxonematoidea =

Extinct superfamily of gastropods

Loxonematoidea is an extinct taxonomic superfamily of sea snails, marine gastropod molluscs, belonging to the Murchisoniinae.
