= Victoria Point (building) =

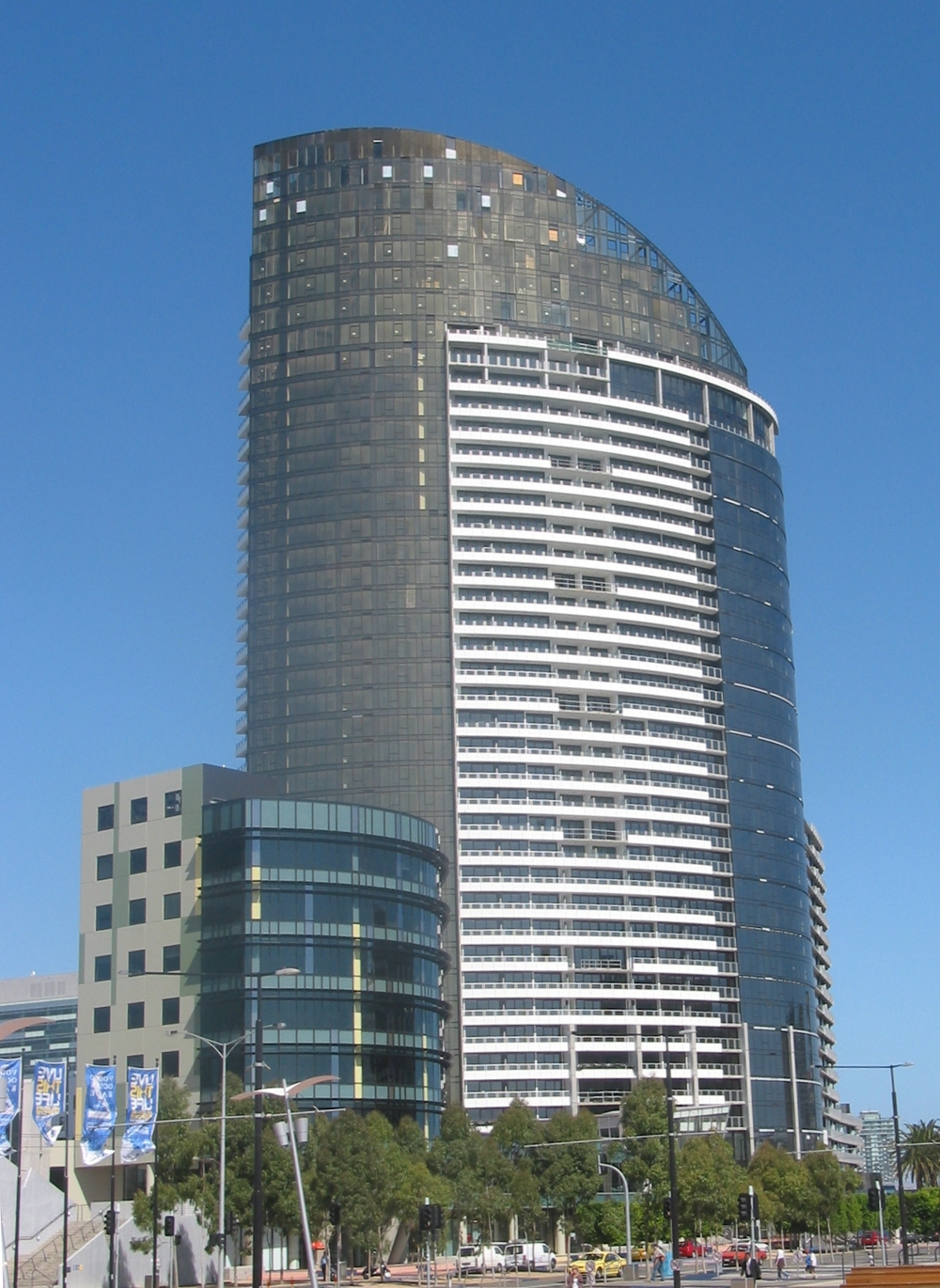
- Interactive map of the Victoria Point area

General information
- Type: residential
- Location: Melbourne, Australia
- Coordinates: 37°49′7″S 144°56′49″E
- Construction started: 2003
- Completed: 2005

Height
- Roof: 128 m (420 ft)

Technical details
- Floor count: 42

Design and construction
- Architecture firm: Buchan Group
- Developer: Multiplex

Website
- https://victoriapointdocklands.com.au/

Victoria Point is a 42 level residential tower located at the corner of Bourke Street and Harbour Esplanade in Docklands, a suburb of Melbourne, Australia.

The site on which Victoria Point sits was originally controlled by the consortium (including Channel 7 and Baulderstone Hornibrook) which developed the Docklands Stadium.

The Melbourne-based developer, RIA Property Group acquired these rights and conceived of and planned the Victoria Point Project, engaging Buchan Architects as lead designers. Construction of the building, by Multiplex on behalf of a joint venture between RIA Property Group and the Brisbane-based Devine Limited, commenced in 2003 and was completed in 2005.

Victoria Point incorporates the Melbourne headquarters of Bendigo Bank (undertaken solely by RIA and which was subsequently on-sold to APN) and a separate Quest serviced apartment complex of 115 serviced apartments. RIA sold down its equity in the project to Devine and the project was subsequently taken forward in joint venture.

It is 128 metres high and has 42 floors and 447 units.

Victoria Point is located at the intersection of Bourke Street and Harbour Esplanade. Street addresses within the development include 100-120 Harbour Esplanade and 744-768 Bourke Street.

The building was used as one of the filming locations for the Channel 9 series Underbelly, and appears in episodes 12 and 13 of the series.

== See also ==
- List of tallest buildings in Melbourne
