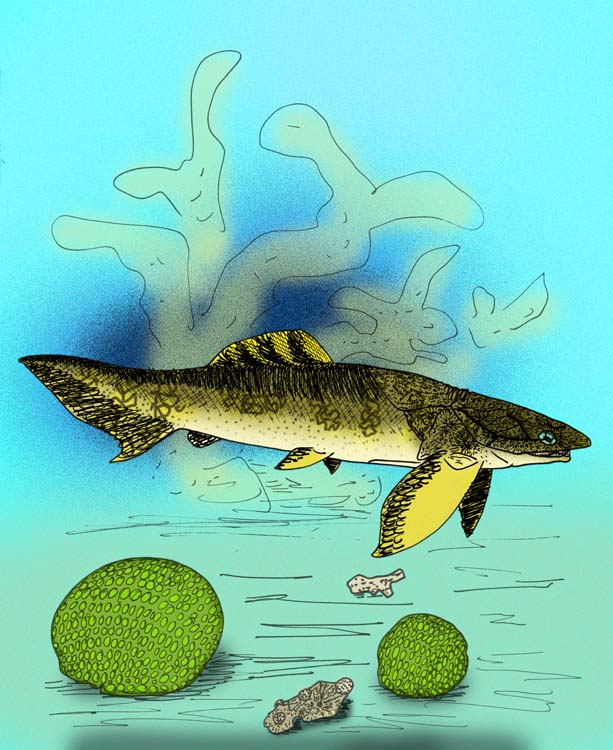
- Artist's reconstruction

Scientific classification
- Kingdom: Animalia
- Phylum: Chordata
- Class: †Placodermi
- Order: †Arthrodira
- Suborder: †Brachythoraci
- Family: †Buchanosteidae
- Genus: †Arenipiscis; Young, 1981
- Species: †A. westolli

Binomial name
- †Arenipiscis westolli Young, 1981

= Arenipiscis =

Arenipiscis Temporal range: Emsian

Extinct genus of fishes

Arenipiscis westolli is an extinct buchanosteid arthrodire placoderm. Its fossils have been found in Emsian-aged marine strata of the Murrumbidgee Group in New South Wales, Australia. The holotype specimen, ANU 35616, is an incomplete skull-roof.

The generic name, meaning "sand fish," refers to how the dermal surfaces of the armor have a pattern of tiny bumps, creating a granular texture.
