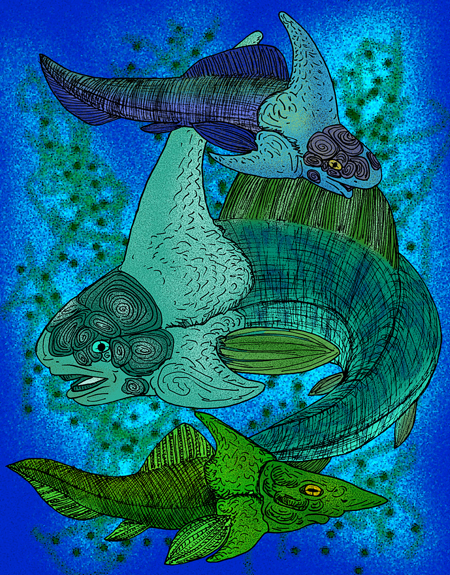
- Weejasperaspis gavini, Murrindalaspis wallacei & Brindabellaspis stensioi

Scientific classification
- Kingdom: Animalia
- Phylum: Chordata
- Class: †Placodermi
- Order: †Acanthothoraci
- Family: †Weejasperaspididae
- Genus: †Murrindalaspis; Long, 1984

Type species
- Murrindalaspis wallacei Long, 1984

Species
- Murrindalaspis wallacei; Murrindalaspis bairdi

= Murrindalaspis =

Murrindalaspis Temporal range: Early Devonian

Extinct genus of fishes

Murrindalaspis is an extinct genus of acanthothoracid placoderm found in the McLarty Member of the Murrindal Limestone, of the Early Devonian-aged Buchan Group in eastern Victoria, Australia. Murrindalaspis differs from other acanthothoracids by having a dorsal plate with a large, blade-like flattened, recurved crest emanating from the medial line, and no ventral keel. So far, the genus is known only from dorsal plates and ossified eyeballs. The genus differs from the closely related Weejasperaspis in that the dorsal crest of the latter is shorter, and triangular-shaped.

== Species ==
There are two species in the genus. M. wallacei, the type species, has a high dorsal medial crest. The second species, M. bairdi, has a much lower crest, a groove along the median line of the ventral side of the dorsal plate, and somewhat coarser tubercles on the dermal surfaces of its armor.
