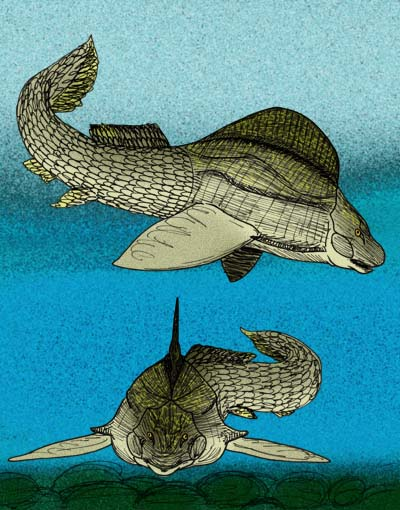

Scientific classification
- Kingdom: Animalia
- Phylum: Chordata
- Class: †Placodermi
- Order: †Arthrodira
- Suborder: †Brachythoraci
- Family: †Holonematidae
- Genus: †Belemnacanthus; Eastman, 1898
- Species: †B. giganteus

Binomial name
- †Belemnacanthus giganteus Eastman, 1898

= Belemnacanthus =

Belemnacanthus Temporal range: Givetian

Belemnacanthus giganteus ("Gigantic arrow-spine") is a large, extinct, barrel-shaped holonematid arthrodire placoderm from Givetian-aged strata of Middle Devonian Eifel, Germany. B. giganteus is known only from the holotype, a 37 centimetres (15 in) portion of a median dorsal plate with a long, somewhat high, arching crest running down the median line of the exterior/dorsal side of the plate. The plate has an ornamentation of ridges that originate from a point posterior to the preserved portion of the median dorsal plate. Before the plate was identified as that of a holonematid, the plate of B. giganteus had been successively described as a tremendous spine of an elasmobranch, an agnathan, and lastly, the plate of an antiarch.
