= Murchisonioidea =

Scientific classification
- Kingdom: Animalia
- Phylum: Mollusca
- Class: Gastropoda
- Subclass: Vetigastropoda
- Order: Pleurotomariida
- Superfamily: †Murchisonioidea; Koken, 1896

Families
- See text

Extinct superfamily of gastropods

Murchisonioidea is an extinct superfamily of small to large sea snails, marine gastropod mollusks in the clade Vetigastropoda.

This superfamily was previously included in the Caenogastropoda by Ponder and Warén (1988) and by Bandel in studies published in 1993 and 1997. However, studies by Tracey et al. (1993) and by Frýda and Manda (1997) put them into the Archaeogastropoda. This has been confirmed by new findings on archaeopod-type protoconchs in species from this families, dating from the early Devonian.

== Taxonomy ==
- Family Murchisoniidae Koken, 1896
- Family Cheeneetnukiidae Blodgett & Cook, 2002
- Family Hormotomidae Wenz, 1938
