= Ganorhynchus =

Ganorhynchus Temporal range: Devonian

Scientific classification
- Kingdom: Animalia
- Phylum: Chordata
- Class: Dipnoi
- Family: †Dipnorhynchidae
- Genus: †Ganorhynchus; Traquair, 1873
- Species: †G. woodwardi

Binomial name
- †Ganorhynchus woodwardi Traquair, 1873

Extinct genus of fishes

Ganorhynchus is an extinct genus of prehistoric marine lungfish from the Devonian period. It is likely paraphyletic.

The type species is †Ganorhynchus woodwardi Traquair, 1873, identified from a partial snout of uncertain age and provenance in the collections of the British Museum, and named after paleoichthyologist Arthur Smith Woodward. A second apparent species, G. splendens Gross, 1937 is known from the early Givetian of Germany, but is likely not closely related to G. woodwardi, with G. splendens being more basal. Another species from Australia, initially described in this genus, was later moved to its own genus, Dipnorhynchus. Another apparent species, G. beecheri Newberry, 1889 from the Catskill Formation of Pennsylvania, US is known from very fragmentary remains, and may not even be a lungfish.
