= Soleniscidae =

Scientific classification
- Kingdom: Animalia
- Phylum: Mollusca
- Class: Gastropoda
- Subclass: Caenogastropoda
- Order: †Subulitoidea
- Family: †Soleniscidae (Knight, 1931) Wenz, 1938

Extinct family of gastropods

Soleniscidae is an extinct family of fossil sea snails, marine gastropod mollusks in the clade Caenogastropoda. It was first seen on the 431–427 Ma (Silurian) and its last recorded appearance was in Late Triassic. It is found in the Americas, South Asia and Asian islands, Europe, northern edge of Africa.
