= Ischnoptygmatidae =

Scientific classification
- Kingdom: Animalia
- Phylum: Mollusca
- Class: Gastropoda
- Subclass: Caenogastropoda
- Order: †Subulitoidea
- Family: †Ischnoptygmatidae; Erwin, 1988

Extinct family of gastropods

Ischnoptygmatidae is an extinct family of fossil sea snails, marine gastropod mollusks in the clade Caenogastropoda.
