= Cheeneetnukiidae =

Cheeneetnukiidae Temporal range: Middle Devonian–Middle Devonian

Scientific classification
- Kingdom: Animalia
- Phylum: Mollusca
- Class: Gastropoda
- Subclass: Vetigastropoda
- Order: Pleurotomariida
- Superfamily: †Murchisonioidea
- Family: †Cheeneetnukiidae; Blodgett & Cook, 2002

Extinct family of gastropods

Cheeneetnukiidae is an extinct family of sea snails, marine gastropod mollusks in the clade Vetigastropoda (according to the taxonomy of the Gastropoda by Bouchet & Rocroi, 2005).

This family has no subfamilies.

== Genera ==
Genera and species within the family Cheeneetnukiidae include:

- Cheeneetnukia Blodgett & Cook, 2002 - type genus
  - Cheeneetnukia australis
  - Cheeneetnukia frydai
  - Cheeneetnukia seminodosa
  - Cheeneetnukia spinosa
- Pingtianispira Cook & Pan, 2004
  - Pingtianispira tuberculata
- Ulungaratoconcha Blodgett & Cook, 2002
  - Ulungaratoconcha bicoronata
  - Ulungaratoconcha bigranulosa
  - Ulungaratoconcha binodosa
  - Ulungaratoconcha bononi
  - Ulungaratoconcha coronata (E.J.A. d’Archiac & E.P. de Verneuil, 1842) - synonym: Murchisonia coronata E.J.A. d’Archiac & E.P. de Verneuil, 1842
  - Ulungaratoconcha heidelbergeri
  - Ulungaratoconcha intermedia
  - Ulungaratoconcha lennensis
