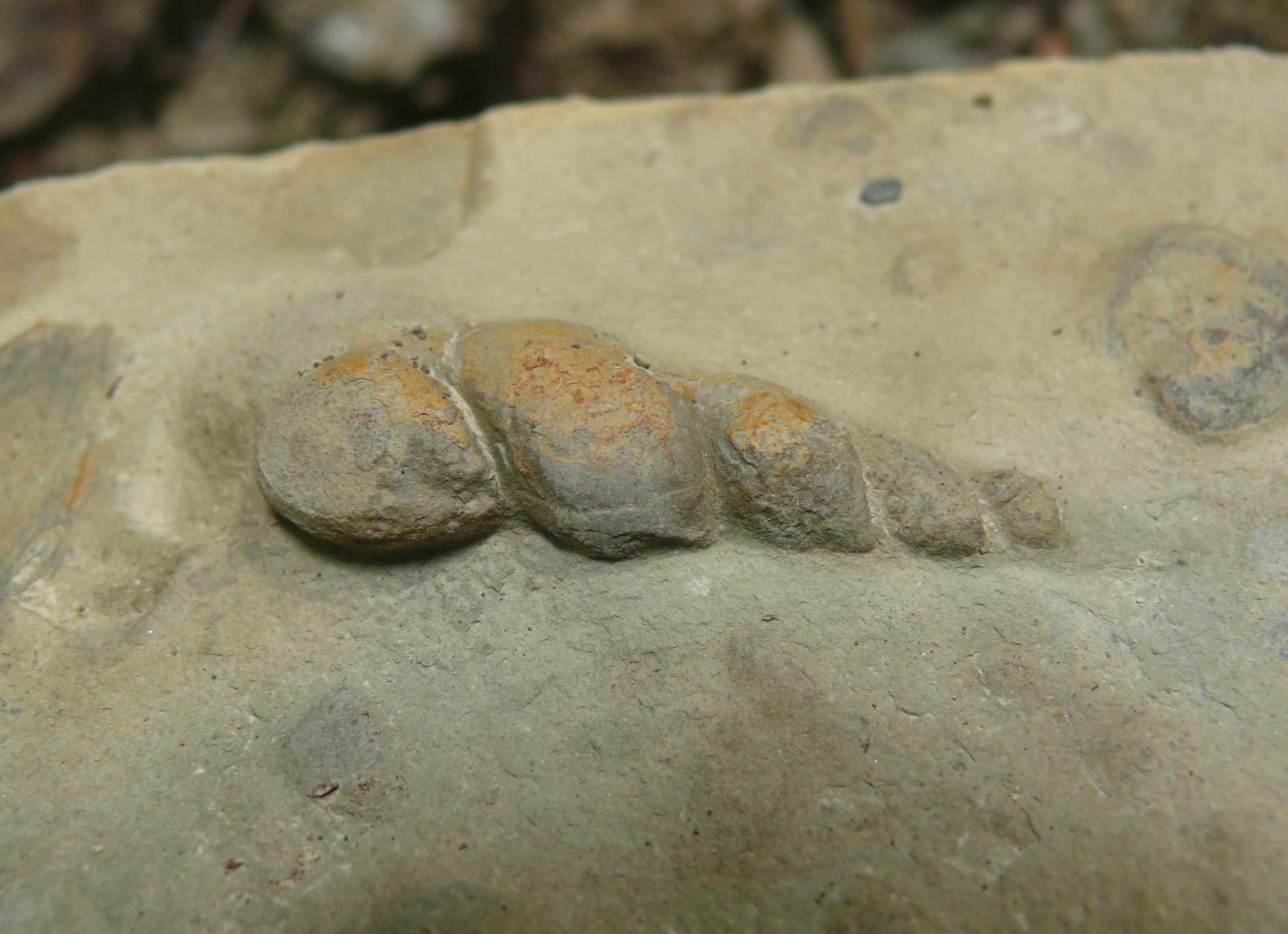
- Loxonema sp.

Scientific classification
- Kingdom: Animalia
- Phylum: Mollusca
- Class: Gastropoda
- Subclass: Vetigastropoda
- Order: Pleurotomariida
- Superfamily: †Loxonematoidea
- Family: †Loxonematidae; Koken, 1889

Synonyms
- Holopellidae Koken, 1896; Omospirinae Wenz, 1938

= Loxonematidae =

Extinct family of gastropods

Loxonematidae is an extinct taxonomic family of sea snails, marine gastropod molluscs.

This family has no subfamilies.

== Genera ==
- Loxonema Phillips, 1841 - type genus of the family Loxonematidae
