= Palaeozygopleuridae =

Palaeozygopleuridae Temporal range: Silurian–Late Devonian

Scientific classification
- Kingdom: Animalia
- Phylum: Mollusca
- Class: Gastropoda
- Subclass: Vetigastropoda
- Order: Pleurotomariida
- Superfamily: †Loxonematoidea
- Family: †Palaeozygopleuridae; Horný, 1955

Extinct family of gastropods

Palaeozygopleuridae is an extinct taxonomic family of fossil sea snails, marine gastropod molluscs.

This family has no subfamilies.

== Genera ==
Genera within the family Palaeozygopleuridae include:

- Palaeozygopleura Horný, 1955
    - Palaeozygopleura chlupaci Frýda, 1993 - from early Lochkovian
    - Palaeozygopleura vaneki Frýda, Ferrová, Berkyová & Frýdová, 2008
  - subgenus Palaeozygopleura (Palaeozygopleura) Horný, 1955
    - Palaeozygopleura alinae (Perner, 1907) - synonym: Zygopleura alinae Perner, 1907 - type species
    - Palaeozygopleura vesna Horný, 1955
  - subgenus Palaeozygopleura (Palaeozyga) Horný, 1955
    - Palaeozygopleura bohemica Horný, 1955
  - subgenus Palaeozygopleura (Bojozyga) Horný, 1955
  - subgenus Palaeozygopleura (Bohemozyga) Frýda & Bandel, 1997
    - Palaeozygopleura kettneri (Horný, 1955)
  - subgenus Palaeozygopleura (Rhenozyga)
    - Palaeozygopleura reifenstuhli Frýda & Blodgett, 2004
- Devonozyga Horný, 1955
- Pragozyga Frýda, 1999
  - Pragozyga costata Frýda, 1999
- Medfrazyga Frýda & Blodgett, 2004 - from Silurian
  - Medfrazyga clauticae Frýda & Blodgett, 2004
