= Subulitidae =

Scientific classification
- Kingdom: Animalia
- Phylum: Mollusca
- Class: Gastropoda
- Subclass: Caenogastropoda
- Order: incertae sedis
- Superfamily: †Subulitoidea
- Family: †Subulitidae; Lindström, 1884

Extinct family of gastropods

Subulitidae is an extinct taxonomic family of fossil sea snails, marine gastropod molluscs in the clade Caenogastropoda.
