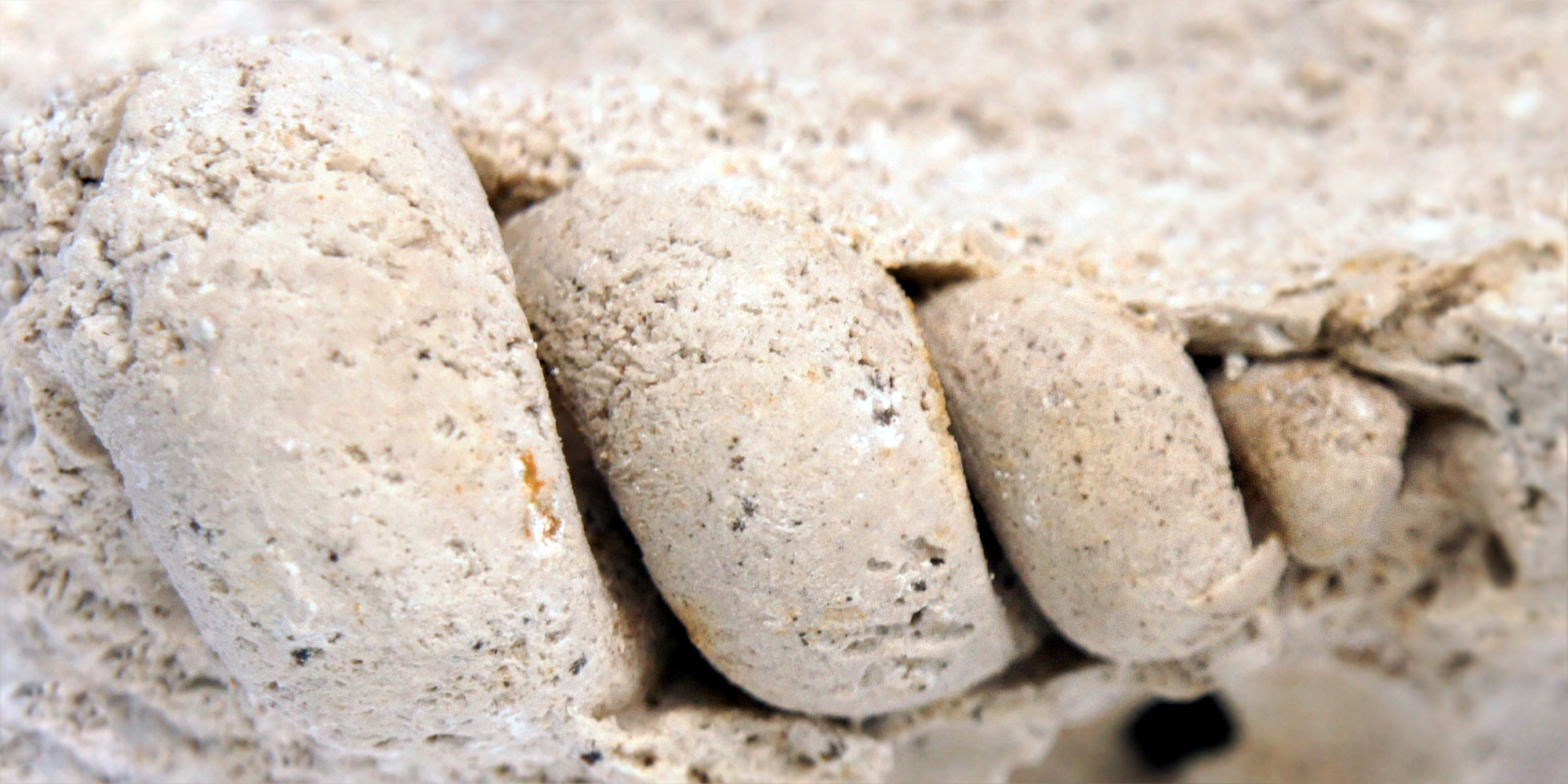
- Murchisonia sp.

Scientific classification
- Kingdom: Animalia
- Phylum: Mollusca
- Class: Gastropoda
- Subclass: Vetigastropoda
- Order: Pleurotomariida
- Superfamily: †Murchisonioidea
- Family: †Murchisoniidae; Koken, 1896

Synonyms
- † Hormotomidae Wenz, 1938

= Murchisoniidae =

Extinct family of gastropods

Murchisoniidae is an extinct family of fossil gastropods in the superfamily Murchisonioidea (according to the taxonomy of the Gastropoda by Bouchet & Rocroi, 2005).

This family has no subfamilies.

== Genera ==
Genera within the family Murchisoniidae include:

- Murchisonia d'Archiac & Verneuil, 1841, the type genus
