= Dipnorhynchidae =

Dipnorhynchidae Temporal range: Devonian

Scientific classification
- Kingdom: Animalia
- Phylum: Chordata
- Class: Dipnoi
- Family: †Dipnorhynchidae

Genera
- †Dipnorhynchus; †Ganorhynchus; †"Speonesydrion"

Extinct family of fishes

Dipnorhynchidae is an extinct family of prehistoric lungfishes which lived during the Devonian period.

== Phylogeny ==
- Sarcopterygii (Class)
  - Dipnoi (Subclass)
    - Dipnorhynchidae (Family)
      - Dipnorhynchus (Genus)
      - Ganorhynchus (Genus)
      - "Speonesydrion" (Genus)
