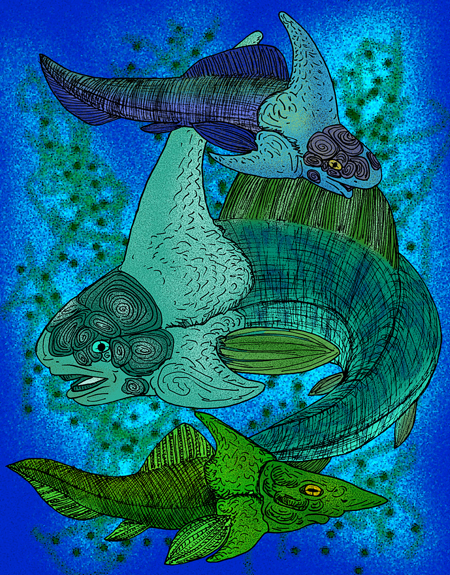
- Weejasperaspis gavini, Murrindalaspis wallacei & Brindabellaspis stensioi

Scientific classification
- Kingdom: Animalia
- Phylum: Chordata
- Class: †Placodermi
- Order: †Acanthothoraci
- Family: †Weejasperaspididae

Genera
- Murrindalaspis; Weejasperaspis

= Weejasperaspididae =

Weejasperaspididae Temporal range: Emsian

Family of fossil fishes

Weejasperaspididae ("Shields of Wee Jasper") is a family of three extinct acanthothoracid placoderms indigenous to the Early Devonian of Victoria and New South Wales, Australia.

== Description ==
The Weejasperaspids are known from median dorsal plates with distinctive, blade-like crests in the median-posterior portion, and ossified eye capsules.

== Evolutionary relationships ==
The main reasons why the weejasperaspids are not considered to be closely related to other non-acanthothoracid placoderms, as opposed to the palaeacanthaspids, are that their skull anatomies and plate histologies are generalized, and do not bear any similarities to any specific non-acanthothoracid group, and that the patterns of ornamentation on their dermal plates are unique to this family.

The placoderm Brindabellaspis stensioi was once regarded as a weejasperaspid because of the similarities between its dermal plates to the other weejasperaspids. Even before it was split off into its own order, it stood out from the others because of its long, pointed snout. French paleontologist Phillipe Janvier placed B. stensioi in its own order, Brindabellaspida, because of how the internal anatomy of the braincase resembled more like those of osteostracans or galeaspids than those of other placoderms.
