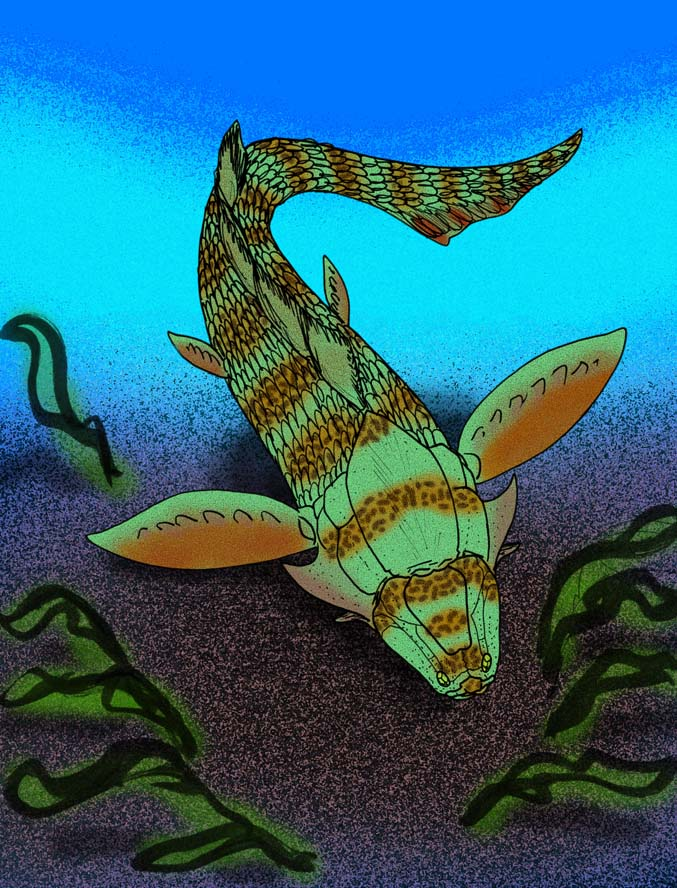
- Artist's reconstruction

Scientific classification
- Kingdom: Animalia
- Phylum: Chordata
- Class: †Placodermi
- Order: †Arthrodira
- Suborder: †Brachythoraci
- Family: †Buchanosteidae
- Genus: †Goodradigbeeon; White, 1978
- Species: †G. australianum

Binomial name
- †Goodradigbeeon australianum White, 1978

= Goodradigbeeon =

Goodradigbeeon Temporal range: Early Devonian, Emsian

Extinct genus of fishes

Goodradigbeeon is an extinct genus of buchanosteid arthrodire placoderm. Its fossils have been found in Emsian-aged marine strata from the Murrumbidgee Group of New South Wales, Australia and the type species is G. australianum.

The holotype was discovered near the Goodradigbee River by Harry A. Toombs and was described by White (1978).
