= Subulitoidea =

Subulitoidea Temporal range: early Ordovician –early Triassic

Scientific classification
- Domain: Eukaryota
- Kingdom: Animalia
- Phylum: Mollusca
- Class: Gastropoda
- Subclass: Caenogastropoda
- Order: †Subulitoidea

Families
- † Subulitidae; † Ischnoptygmatidae

Superfamily of sea snails

Subulitoidea is an extinct superfamily of fossil sea snails, marine gastropod mollusks in the clade Caenogastropoda.
