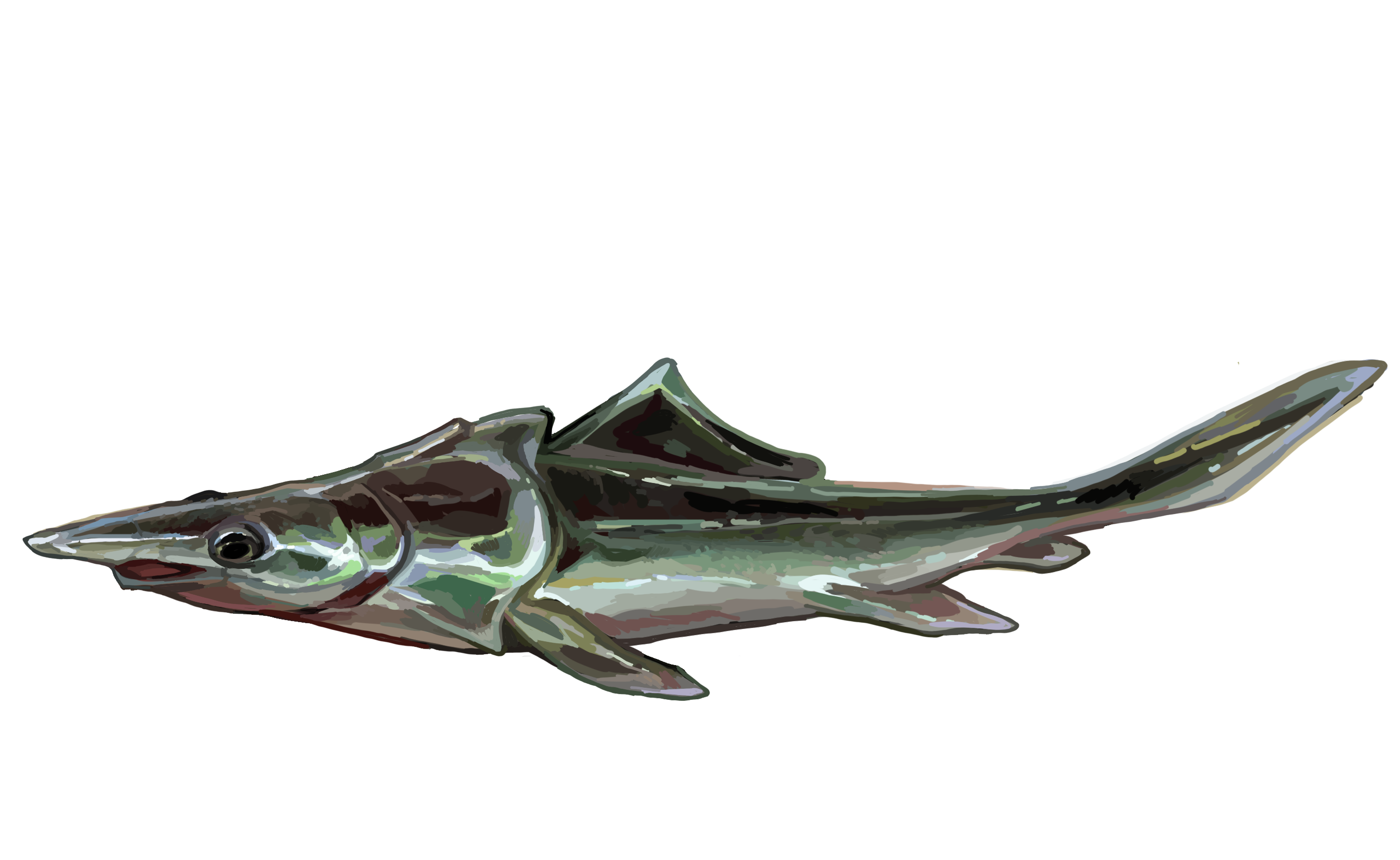
- Artist's reconstruction of B. stensioi

Scientific classification
- Kingdom: Animalia
- Phylum: Chordata
- Class: †Placodermi
- Order: †Brindabellaspida; Gardiner, 1993
- Genus: †Brindabellaspis; Young, 1980
- Species: †B. stensioi

Binomial name
- †Brindabellaspis stensioi Young, 1980

= Brindabellaspis =

Brindabellaspis Temporal range: Early Devonian

Genus of fishes

Brindabellaspis stensioi ("Erik Stensiö's Brindabella Ranges Shield") is a placoderm with a flat, platypus-like snout from the Early Devonian of the Murrumbidgee Group in Australia. This unusual form indicated a specialized niche, although what this niche was exactly is hard to determine due to a lack of jaw bones. Regardless, its dorsolaterally positioned eyes are consistent with a benthic lifestyle. When B. stensioi was first discovered in 1980, it was originally regarded as a Weejasperaspid acanthothoracid due to anatomical similarities with the other species found at the reef.

According to Philippe Janvier, anatomical similarities of B. stensioi's brain and braincase with those of jawless fish, such as the Osteostraci and the Galeaspida, strongly suggest that B. stensioi, and also the antiarchs, are basal placoderms closest to the ancestral placoderm.
