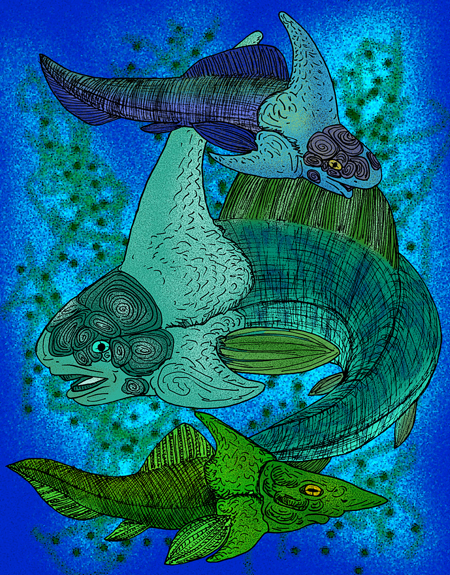
- Weejasperaspis gavini, Murrindalaspis wallacei & Brindabellaspis stensioi

Scientific classification
- Kingdom: Animalia
- Phylum: Chordata
- Class: †Placodermi
- Order: †Acanthothoraci; Stensiö, 1944

Families
- Weejasperaspididae †; Hagiangellidae †; Palaeacanthaspidae †

Synonyms
- Acanthothoraciformes

= Acanthothoraci =

Acanthothoraci Temporal range: Early to Middle Devonian

Extinct order of fishes

Acanthothoraci (spine chests) is an extinct group of chimaera-like placoderms closely related to the rhenanid placoderms. Superficially, the acanthoracids resembled scaly chimaeras and (relatively) heavily armored ptyctodonts. They were distinguished from chimaeras by their large scales and plates, a pair of large spines that emanate from their chests (thus, the order's name), tooth-like beak plates, and the typical bone-enhanced placoderm eyeball. They were distinguished from other placoderms by differences in skull anatomy and by patterns on the skull plates and thoracic plates that are unique to this order.

== Fossil record ==
Fossils of the acanthothoracids are found in various deposits from the Lower Devonian throughout the world. Fossils of the Palaeacanthaspids are found in Eurasia and Canada, while the Weejasperaspids have only been found in the Wee Jasper reef, in Southeastern Australia.

== Ecology ==
From what can be inferred from the mouthplates of fossil specimens, the acanthothoracids were ecologically similar to modern-day chimaeras, being a clique of shellfish hunters. Competition with their relatives, the ptyctodont placoderms, may have been one of the main reasons for the acanthothoracids' extinction prior to the Mid Devonian extinction event.

== Families ==
Three families have been recognized:

- Palaeacanthaspidae is the most widespread of the three families. Fossils of palaeacanthaspids are found in Lower Devonian strata of Europe, Canada, Saudi Arabia, and East Asia. Palaeacanthaspids have short rostrums and large nostrils situated dorsally on the forehead, almost directly between the eyes. They also had stout spines emanating from the back of the median dorsal plates of their shoulder-girdles and a spine emanating on plates directly in front of the pectoral fins. Dermal plates were decorated with either tubercules or scales with stellate patterns.
- Weejasperaspididae is restricted to New South Wales, and Victoria Australia. Compared to the corresponding spines of palaeacanthaspids, the spines of weejasperaspids are long and markedly stout. The armor of weejasperaspids were decorated with small tubercules.
- Hagiangellidae is a monogeneric family, currently represented by Hagiangella goujeti, which is restricted to Lochkovian strata of the Khao Loc formation in Tung Vai, Ha Giang Province of Northern Vietnam. From what can be discerned from the various scrappy fossils, H. goujeti had a relatively high-domed head, especially when compared to the bun-shaped heads of other acanthothoracids, and had serrations on the spines in front of its pectoral fins.

== Relation to other placoderms ==
Most placoderm experts have reached a consensus that Acanthothoracida is the sister group of the rest of Placodermi, save for, perhaps, Stensioella and Pseudopetalichthyida. This is the result of a careful reexamination of the various members of the Acanthothoracid family Palaeacanthaspidae in that particular species within that family share various anatomical similarities with other placoderm orders, particularly the anatomies of their braincase, dermal plate arrangement and bone histology. In 2011 the genus Hagianella, of the monotypic family Hagianellidae, was reappraised as possibly being the sister-group of Ptyctodontida in light of similarities of skull anatomies. Accordingly, Palaeacanthaspidae and Hagianellidae are now considered paraphyletic in view of similarities of their members to primitive members of other placoderm orders.

The family Weejasperaspididae, on the other hand, is considered monophyletic. Because of the Weejasperaspids' generalized anatomy and strong similarities with the palaeacanthaspids, but no overt similarities with any other order save Brindabellaspida, they are regarded as either basal placoderms or very close to the basal placoderm.
