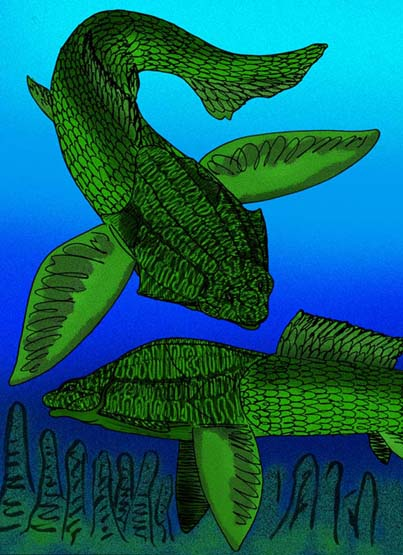
- H. westolli

Scientific classification
- Domain: Eukaryota
- Kingdom: Animalia
- Phylum: Chordata
- Class: †Placodermi
- Order: †Arthrodira
- Suborder: †Brachythoraci
- Family: †Holonematidae
- Genus: †Holonema; Newberry, 1889

Type species
- Pterichthys rugosum Claypole, 1883

Species
- H. rugosum (Claypole, 1883); H. arcticum Marik-Kurik, 1975; H. bruehni Markus, 1998; H. harmae Mark, 1953; H. farrowi Stevens, 1964; H. obrutshevi Mark, 1953; H. ornatum Traquair, 1903; H. haiti Denison, 1968; H. radiatum Obruchev, 1932; H. westolli Miles, 1971

Synonyms
- Pterichthys rugosus Claypole, 1883; ?Glyptaspis eastmanni Swartz, 1913; Holonema horridum Cope, 1892; Holonema rohoni nomen nudum Obruchev 1931

= Holonema =

Holonema Temporal range: Givetian to Frasnian, 387.7–372.2 Ma

Extinct genus of fishes

Holonema is an extinct genus of relatively large, barrel-shaped arthrodire placoderms that were found in oceans throughout the world from the Mid to Late Devonian, when the last species perished in the Frasnian-Fammian extinction event. Most species of the genus are known from fragments of their armor, but the Gogo Reef species, H. westolli, is known from whole, articulated specimens.

== Description ==
Holonema is thought to have been a benthic-dwelling fish, based on its cambered body shape, which performs better hydrodynamically when closer to the sea bed. Although previously thought to have fed in the bottom seafloor mud, more recent morphological studies of the jaw and toothplates suggest a more planktivorous lifestyle. Holonema fossil individuals have small stones in the trunk shield, and pieces of feldspar in the abdominal region, suggesting Holonema used these as gastroliths for processing food.

== Species ==
=== H. rugosum ===
H. rugosum is the type species. It was originally described as a species of the antiarch genus, Pterichthys. Fossils are found in Frasnian strata of New York and Pennsylvania, and Givetian strata of Wisconsin and Michigan. It is a fairly large species, though the type specimen is of an 18 centimeter long median dorsal plate belonging to a small individual. Fossils of H. horridum and Glyptaspis eastmani may be this species. Fossils from Frasnian Iran (H. cf. rugosum) may also belong to this species.

=== H. arcticum ===
A large species from Givetian-aged strata in Novaya Zemlya, Russia, known only from two plates from one individual's trunk shield.

=== H. bruehni ===
H. bruehni is a recently discovered species from the Middle Eifelian-aged Brandenberg stratum of Sauerland, Northwestern Germany. Juveniles had a dermal ornamentation of irregularly spaced tubercles, while the dermal surface of adults' armor were smooth.

=== H. farrowi ===
Known from fragments from the Givetian-aged "Traverse Group" stratum in Michigan. The median dorsal plates range up to 20 cm in length. The median dorsal plate is fairly broad at the posterior end, but narrows as one approaches the anterior end.

=== H. haiti ===
Known from fragments from the Givetian section of the Jefferson formation in Idaho. The median dorsal plate is estimated to be about 28 cm in length, and is very narrow compared to those of other species.

=== H. harmae ===
Found in the Givetian-aged Burtnieki beds of Estonia. It is distinguished from other species in that the spinal and subpectoral margins of the anterior-ventral plates meet at almost a right angle.

=== H. obrutshevi ===
Found in the Eifelian-aged Aruküla beds of Estonia. The median dorsal plate has a small, horn-like process, and the trunkshield is somewhat circular when viewed from the top or bottom.

=== H. ornatum ===
From the Givetian-aged Bressay flags of the Shetland Islands. Imperfectly known. Denison 1978 suggests that it may not belong to Holonema.

=== H. radiatum ===
This species is known primarily from the Frasnian-aged Shelon beds of the Baltic, and the Donetz Basin of Russia. Specimens and fragments from the Frasnian-aged Holy Cross Mountain of Poland, and the Givetian sections of the Fiskekløfta formation in Spitzbergen. It is a fairly large species with a moderately narrow median dorsal plate. The median dorsal plate averages about 30 cm in length.

=== H. westolli ===
This is the best-known species of the genus, known from numerous, often articulated specimens from the Frasnian-aged Gogo Reef. The species is very similar to H. rugosum, but the trunk shield is comparatively more narrow. This species reached around 60.6 cm (23.9 in) long.
