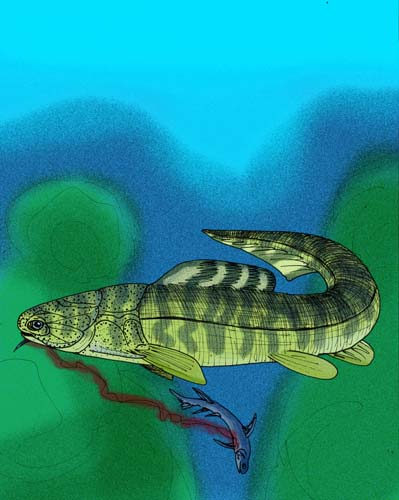
- Buchanosteus confertituberculatus

Scientific classification
- Kingdom: Animalia
- Phylum: Chordata
- Class: †Placodermi
- Order: †Arthrodira
- Suborder: †Brachythoraci
- Family: †Buchanosteidae; White, 1952

Type species
- Phlyctaenaspis australis var. confertituberculata Chapman, 1916

Genera
- Arenipiscis; Buchanosteus; Burrinjucosteus; Errolosteus; Exutaspis; Goodradigbeeon; Narrominaspis; Parabuchanosteus; Taemasosteus; Toombsosteus; Uralosteus

Synonyms
- Goodradigbeeonidae; Taemasosteidae

= Buchanosteidae =

Buchanosteidae Temporal range: Lochkovian–Emsian

Extinct family of fishes

Buchanosteidae is a family of arthrodire placoderms that lived from the Early to Middle Devonian. Fossils appear in various strata in Russia, Central Asia, Australia, and China.

All buchanosteids tend to have flattened (of varying degrees depending on the genus) heads, with most genera also having large orbits.

== Genera ==
=== Arenipiscis ===
From the Emsian of the Murrumbidgee Group New South Wales, it is known from several scrappy remains. It had a narrow skull, and the dermal surfaces of the bony armor were covered in a pattern of fine, granular tubercles.

=== Buchanosteus ===
The type genus, species are found in Emsian-aged strata (Wee Jasper reef) in Australia, and also China and Kazakhstan.

=== Burrinjucosteus ===
A large buchanosteid from the Murrumbidgee Group of Emsian-aged New South Wales. Its skull roof suggests the living animal was fairly broad and flat.

=== Errolosteus ===
One of several Wee Jasper reef buchanosteid genera, Errolosteus had a comparatively broad, short skull.

=== Exutaspis ===
A "giant" buchanosteid from Emsian-aged strata in China. The holotype, an endocranium, was originally described as that of a phlyctaeniid. The endocranium is several times larger than that of its sympatric relative, B. guangxiensis.

=== Goodradigbeeon ===
A flattened buchanosteid from the Emsian Wee Jasper reef Reef, it shares anatomical similarities with homostiids. Unlike the other Taemas-Weejasper buchanosteids, Goodradigbeeon is known from at least one mostly articulated specimen.

=== Narrominaspis ===
A small, large-eyed stem buchanosteid, it is known from Late Lochkovian-aged strata of the Connemarra Formation in Central New South Wales.

=== Parabuchanosteus ===
Another one of the Murrumbidgee Group buchanosteids, Parabuchanosteus was originally described as a species of Buchanosteus, but was then promoted to its own genus due to differences in anatomy. The main difference between the two genera is that Parabuchanosteus has a somewhat shorter thoracic armor.

=== Taemasosteus ===
An "advanced" New South Wales buchanosteid also from the Murrumbidgee Group, it has various anatomical features found in other arthrodire groups, such as coccosteids and homostiids, but not with other buchanosteids.

=== Toombstosteus ===
This genus is known from scrappy remains found in the Murrumbidgee Group of Emsian New South Wales.

=== Uralosteus ===
This genus is found in two Emsian-aged deposits in the Ural Mountains in the Autonomous Republic of Bashkortostan, Russia. The anatomy is similar, but distinct from other buchanosteids. The dermal surface of the armor has a unique pattern of crowded ridging.
