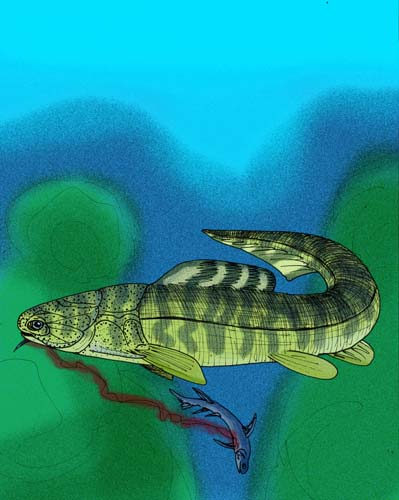
- Buchanosteus confertituberculatus

Scientific classification
- Kingdom: Animalia
- Phylum: Chordata
- Class: †Placodermi
- Order: †Arthrodira
- Suborder: †Brachythoraci
- Family: †Buchanosteidae
- Genus: †Buchanosteus; Stensiö, 1945

Type species
- Phlyctaenaspis australis var. confertituberculata Chapman, 1916

Species
- Buchanosteus confertituberculatus (Chapman, 1916); Buchanosteus guangxiensis Wang, 2005; Buchanosteus nuricus Mark-Kurik, 2004

= Buchanosteus =

Buchanosteus Temporal range: Pragian–Emsian

Extinct genus of fishes

Buchanosteus is an extinct genus of arthrodire placoderm. Its fossils have been found in Early Devonian-aged marine strata throughout Asia and Australia. It contains the following species:

- Buchanosteus confertituberculatus, the type species, is known from several specimens found from the Emsian-aged Taemas-Weejasper Reef in what is now New South Wales, Australia. It coexisted sympatrically with other buchanosteid genera there.
- Buchanosteus guangxianensis is known primarily from a well-preserved, albeit incomplete endocranium from Pragian-aged deposits near Guangxi, China. It is compared to another buchanosteid, the "giant" Exutaspis from the late Emsian Wuding Formation in Yunnan.
- Buchanosteus nuricus is known from one or two specimens from Emsian strata in the Qaranghandy Region in Kazakhstan, and named for the Nura River. Is very similar in anatomy to B. confertituberculatus
