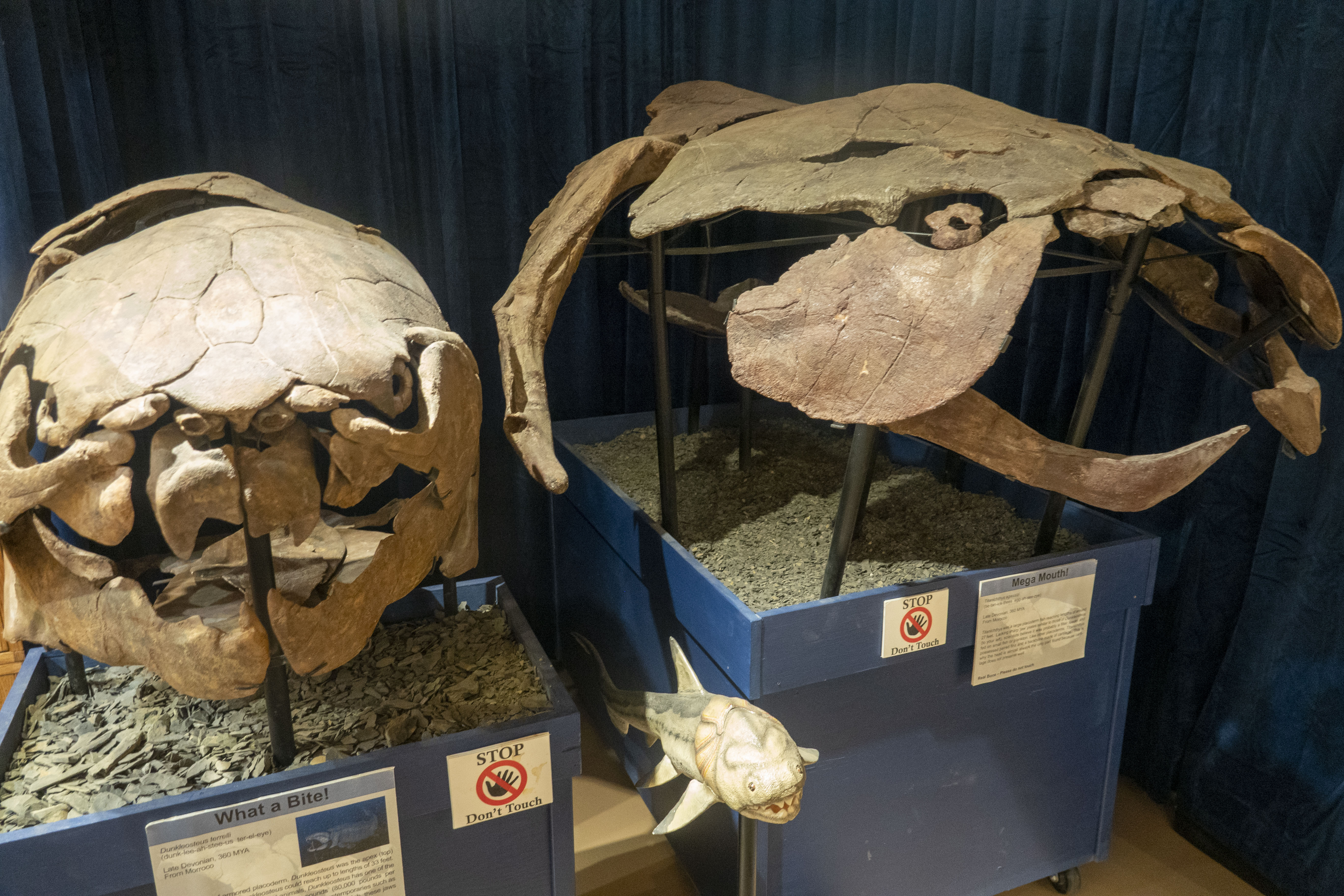
- Dunkleosteus and Titanichthys skulls in Wyoming Dinosaur Center

Scientific classification
- Kingdom: Animalia
- Phylum: Chordata
- Class: †Placodermi
- Order: †Arthrodira
- Clade: †Phlyctaenioidei
- Suborder: †Brachythoraci; Gross, 1932

Contained taxa
- Eubrachythoraci; Xiangshuiosteus; Gemuendenaspis; Dhanguura; Buchanosteoidea; Homosteidae; Holonematidae?

= Brachythoraci =

Brachythoraci Temporal range: Devonian

Extinct suborder of fishes

Brachythoraci is an extinct suborder of arthrodire placoderms, armored fish most diverse during the Devonian.

== Phylogeny ==
Arthrodira is divided into three main groups: the paraphyletic Actinolepida and Phlyctaenii, and then the monophyletic Brachythoraci. Brachythoraci is then further divided into the large derived clade Eubrachythoraci and several basal groups: Buchanosteoidea, Homosteidae, and Holonematidae. (Although Holonematidae's membership in Brachythoraci is disputed.)

Below is a cladogram from the 2016 Zhu et al. phylogenetic study:

- Phlyctaenioidei
  - Elvaspis tuberculata
  - Dicksonosteus arcticus
  - Turrisaspis elektor
  - Groenlandaspis antarcticus
  - Holonema westolli
  - Brachythoraci
    - Homostiidae
      - Homostius sulcatus
      - Antineosteus lehmani
    - - Buchanosteoidea
        - Buchanosteus confertituberculatus
        - Goodradigbeeon australianum
        - Parabuchanosteus murrumbidgeeni
      - - Dhanguura johnstoni
        - - Gemuendenaspis angusta
          - - Xiangshuiosteus wui
            - Eubrachythoraci
              - Coccosteomorphi
                - Coccosteoidea
                  - Coccosteidae
                    - - Millerosteus minor
                      - Coccosteus cuspidatus
                    - - Dickosteus threiplandi
                      - Watsonosteus fletti
                      - Protitanichthys rockportensis
                  - Panxiosteidae
                    - Plourdosteus canadensis
                    - Panxiosteus ocullus
                    - Janiosteus timanicus
                - Incisoscutoidea
                  - Harrytoombsia elegans
                  - - Torosteus tuberculatus
                    - Torosteus pulchellus
                  - - Mcnamaraspis kaprios
                    - - Compagopiscis croucheri
                      - Trematosteus fontanellus
                      - Camuropiscidae
                        - - Incisoscutum ritchiei
                          - Incisoscutum sarahae
                        - - Rolfosteus canningensis
                          - - Tubonasus lennardensis
                            - - Fallacosteus turneri
                              - - Camuropiscis laidlawi
                                - Latocamurus coulthardi
              - Pachyosteomorphi
                - Rhachiosteus pterygiatus
                - - Dunkleosteoidea
                    - Eastmanosteus calliaspis
                    - - - Eastmanosteus pustulosus
                        - Kiangyousteus yohii
                      - - Golshanichthys asiatica
                        - - Westralichthys uwagedensis
                          - - - Dunkleosteus raveri
                              - Dunkleosteus terrelli
                            - - Dunkleosteus amblyodoratus
                              - Heterostiidae
                                - Heterosteus ingens
                                - Yinosteus major
                  - Aspinothoracidi
                    - Tapinosteus heintzi
                    - - - Bullerichthys fascidens
                        - - Kendrickichthys cavernosus
                          - Bruntonichthys multidens
                      - - Dinichthys herzeri
                        - - Hadrosteus rapax
                          - - Gorgonichthys clarki
                            - Selenosteidae
                              - Heintzichthys gouldii
                              - Pachyosteus bulla
                              - Gymnotrachelus hydei
                              - Stenosteus angustopectus
                              - Brachyosteus dietrichi
                              - - Melanosteus occitanus
                                - Rhinosteus parvulus
