= Emsian =

Third stage of the Devonian

- 410.62 ± 1.95 – 393.47 ± 0.99 Ma
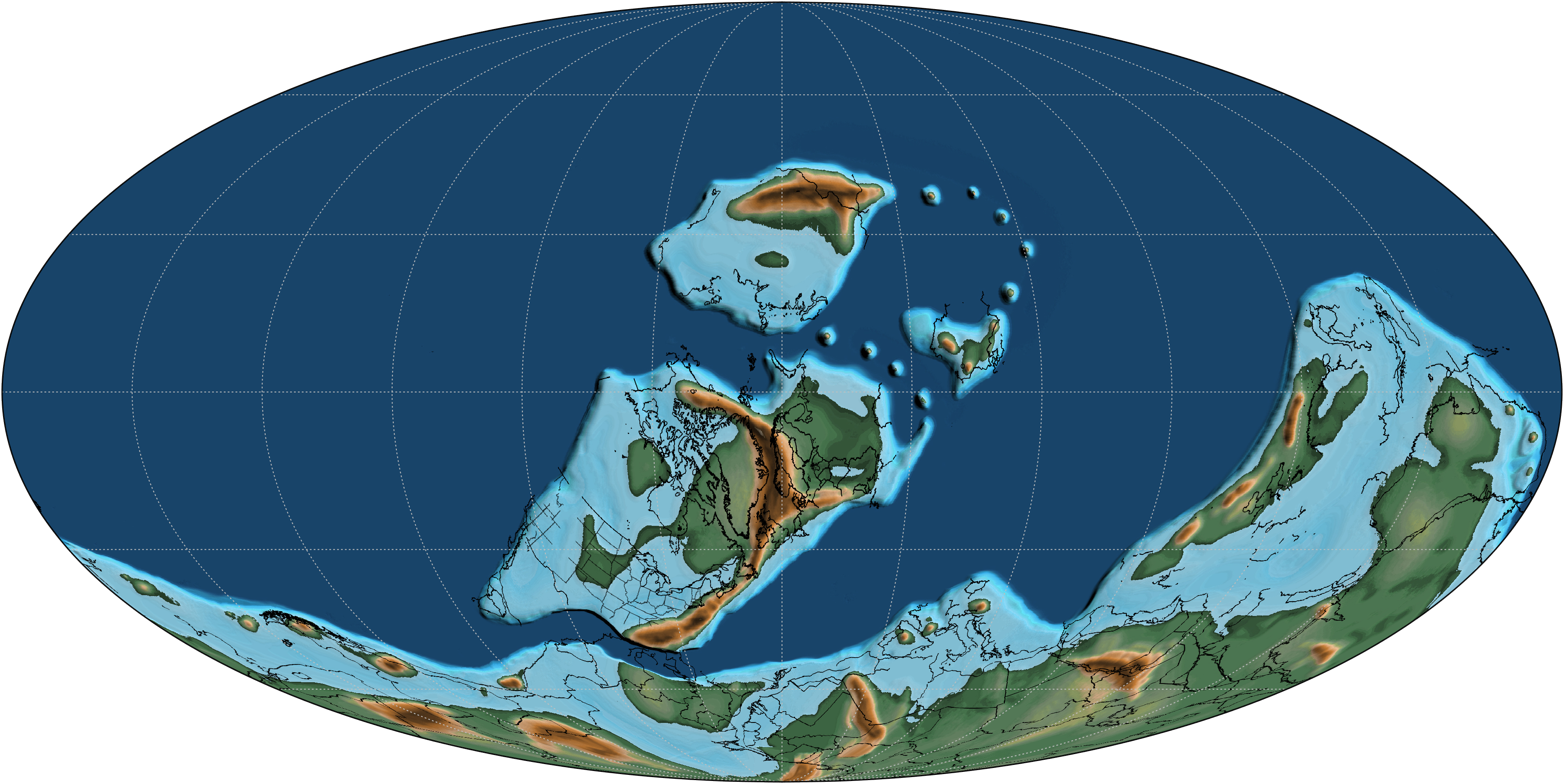
- Paleogeography of the Emsian, 405 Ma

Chronology
← / Hangenberg event, Famennian glaciation; ← / Kellwasser event (Late Devonian mass extinction); ← / Widespread shrubs & trees; ← / Hunsrück fauna; ← / Rhynie chert
Subdivision of the Devonian according to the ICS, as of 2023; Vertical axis scale: Millions of years ago

Etymology
- Name formality: Formal
- Name ratified: 1985

Usage information
- Celestial body: Earth
- Regional usage: Global (ICS)
- Time scale(s) used: ICS Time Scale

Definition
- Chronological unit: Age
- Stratigraphic unit: Stage
- Time span formality: Formal
- Lower boundary definition: FAD of the conodont Polygnathus kitabicus
- Lower boundary GSSP: Zinzil'ban Gorge, Uzbekistan; 39.2000°N 67.3056°E
- Lower GSSP ratified: 1995
- Upper boundary definition: FAD of the conodont Polygnathus costatus partitus
- Upper boundary GSSP: Wetteldorf Richtschnitt section, Wetteldorf, Eifel, Germany; 50.1496°N 6.4716°E
- Upper GSSP ratified: 1985

The Emsian is one of three faunal stages in the Early Devonian Epoch. It lasted from 410.62 ±1.95 million years ago to 393.47 ±0.99 million years ago. It was preceded by the Pragian Stage and followed by the Eifelian Stage. It is named after the Ems river in Germany. The GSSP is located in the Zinzil'ban Gorge in the Kitab State Geological Reserve of Uzbekistan, 35 centimetres (14 in) above the contact with the Madmon Formation.

In North America the Emsian Stage is represented by Sawkill or Sawkillian time.

== Biological events ==
Emsian-age conical mud mounds at Hamar Laghdad, Morocco

During this period, earliest known agoniatitid ammonoid fossils began appearing within this stage after first appearing in previous stage and began to evolutionarily radiate within this stage, in which a new ammonoid order Goniatitida rises in the end of Zlichovian stage (Siberian representation; corresponds to early Eifelian and after the end of Early Devonian, before 391.9 mya). Later agoniatitid ammonoids would die out in the Taghanic event in the upper middle Givetian. Goniatite ammonoids would give rise to further ammonoid orders, thus starting ammonoid dominance of marine fossils in further periods until their end at the Cretaceous-Paleogene mass extinction event.
