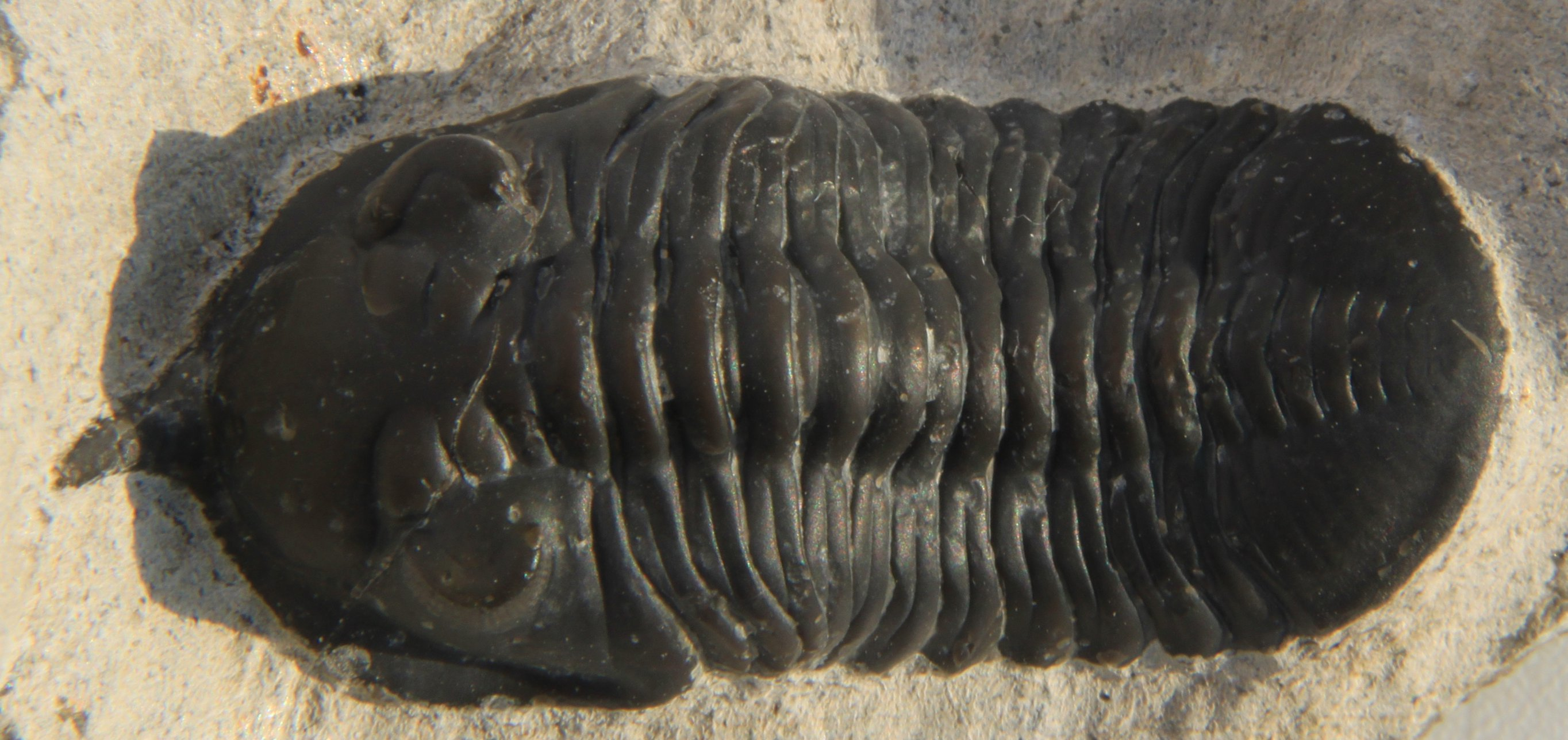

Scientific classification
- Kingdom: Animalia
- Phylum: Arthropoda
- Clade: †Artiopoda
- Class: †Trilobita
- Order: †Phacopida
- Family: †Acastidae
- Genus: †Morocconites; Boucot, McClure, Alvarez, Ross, Taylor, Struve, Savage & Turner, 1989
- Species: †M. malladoides

Binomial name
- †Morocconites malladoides Boucot, McClure, Alvarez, Ross, Taylor, Struve, Savage & Turner, 1989

= Morocconites =

Morocconites Temporal range: 407–392 Ma Emsian/Eifelian

Morocconites malladoides is an average size (about 5 centimetres or 2.0 inches) trilobite, which lived during the Devonian period, in what is now southern Morocco. This species is assumed to be a close relative of Acastoides. The most conspicuous feature is the very long upcurved frontal medial spine, a bit like an avocet bill. It is the only known species in this genus (i.e. the genus is monotypic).

== Description ==
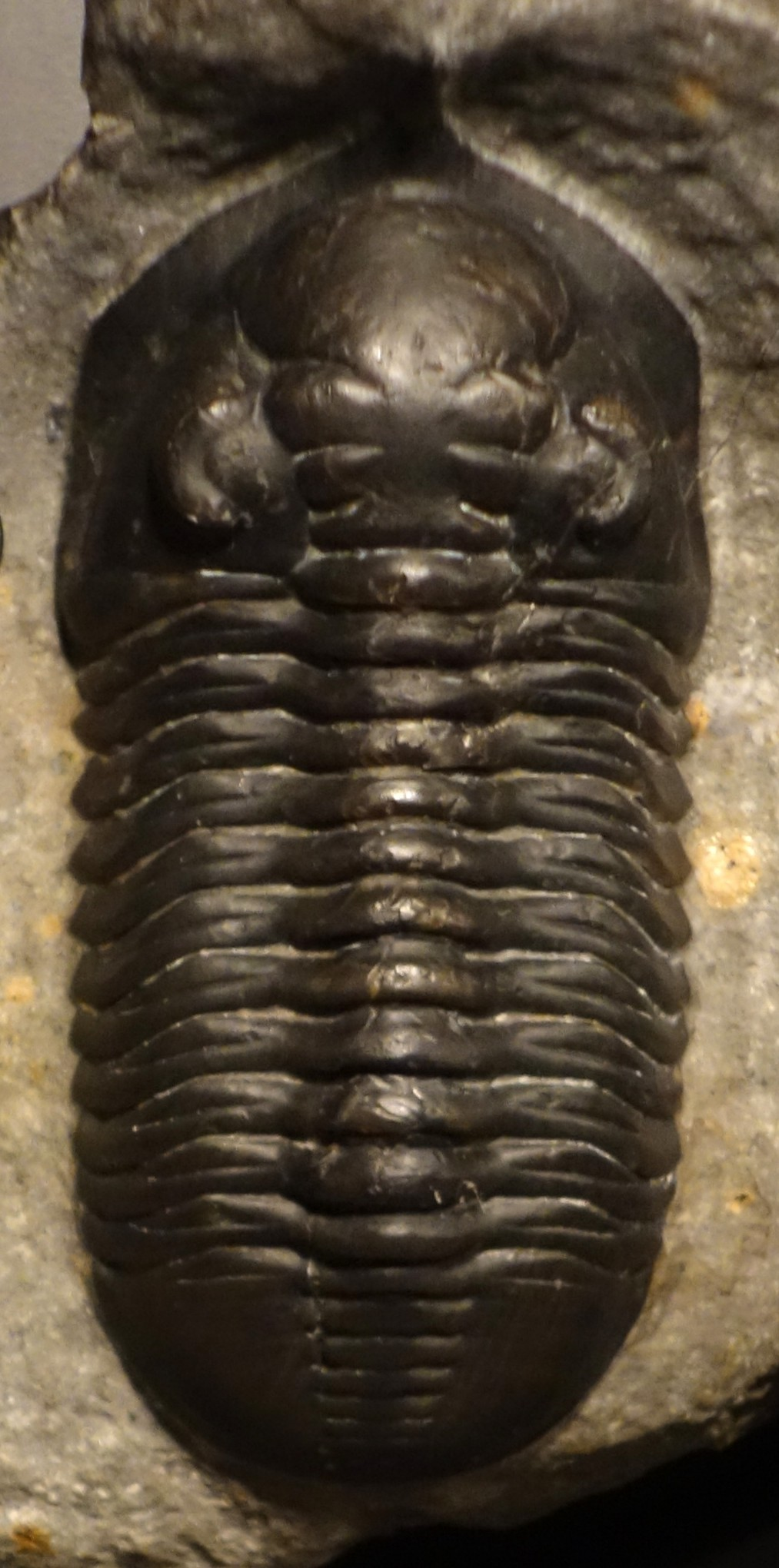
Morocconites, National Museum of Nature and Science, Tokyo

The general outline of Morocconites is a bar about twice as long as wide, with approximately parallel sides and rounded front and back ends. The horizontal outline of the cephalon (or head) is pentangular, with a long, upcurved, frontal medial spine. At the axis, the cephalon takes up about 30% of the total body length. The horizontal outline of the raised part of the cephalon is approximately parabolic. The central area of the cephalon, separated from the eye area by a lateral furrow, is called the glabella. Posteriorly, a left to right furrow singles off the occipital ring. This furrow is deep laterally and shallower near the axis. In front of the occipital ring, the glabella is divided by deep furrows into three pairs of lateral lobes and a frontal lobe, but these furrows do not cross the axis. The most posterior of the three lateral lobes is bluntly triangular. The other lateral lobes look like match heads, the anterior one larger and stretching out further from the axis. The frontal lobe is mushroom-shaped. It has schizochroal eyes with 26 vertical files (or rows), each containing five or, rarely, six lenses per file, except for a few files with less lenses at the front and back edge of the eye. The posterior margin of the cephalon progressively curves backwards laterally to about 60˚ with the axis. There is no genal spine, in fact, the genal angle is gently rounded. Its thorax (or body) has 11 articulating segments, like most Phacopina. The axis is about ¼ of the width of the thorax and lightly convex (transversely). The pleural (or side) lobes do not end in spines, but are gently rounded, and the margin of the pygidium (or tail) is entire, two features it shares with both Acastinae and Phacopidae. The pygidium takes up about ¼ of the total body length. The axis of the pygidium is divided in about nine recognisable segments. The furrows of the five most anterior segments are deep laterally, but very shallow in the middle third. The furrows between the posterior pygidial segments are faint, while segmentation in the pleural region of the pygidium is barely discernable.

== Distribution ==
Morocconites malladoides, the only designated species of this (monotypical) genus lived during the late Lower Devonian (Emsian) or early Middle Devonian (Eifelian) in what is now southern Morocco, and presumably neighbouring Mauritania and the former Spanish Sahara.

== Habitat ==
Most phacopids were probably marine bottom-dwellers.

== Ecology ==
Morocconites is presumed to have been a fast-moving low-level epifaunal detritivore.
