= Acastocephala =

Acastocephala Temporal range: Silurian

Scientific classification
- Domain: Eukaryota
- Kingdom: Animalia
- Phylum: Arthropoda
- Class: †Trilobita
- Order: †Phacopida
- Family: †Acastidae
- Genus: †Acastocephala; Shergold, 1966

Species
- A. macrops (Salter, 1864) (type) synonym Phacops downingiae var. β. macrops; A. dudleyensis Shergold, 1966

Extinct genus of trilobites

Acastocephala is a genus of trilobites from the middle Silurian, known from the United Kingdom.

== Etymology ==
The name is derived from the genus Acaste and the Ancient Greek κεφαλή (kephalē) "head", indicating the headshield is similar to Acaste.

== Taxonomy ==
Acastocephala may contain the ancestor of Acastava.

== Distribution ==
- Acastocephala macrops occurs in the Middle Silurian of the United Kingdom (Wenlock Shale, Malvern, Worcestershire; Wenlock Limestone, Pen-y-Lan, Cardiff, and Dudley and Ludlow, Ledbury, Hereford).
- Acastocephala dudleyensis has been found in the Middle Silurian of the United Kingdom (Wenlock Limestone, Wren's Nest, Dudley, Worcestershire).
