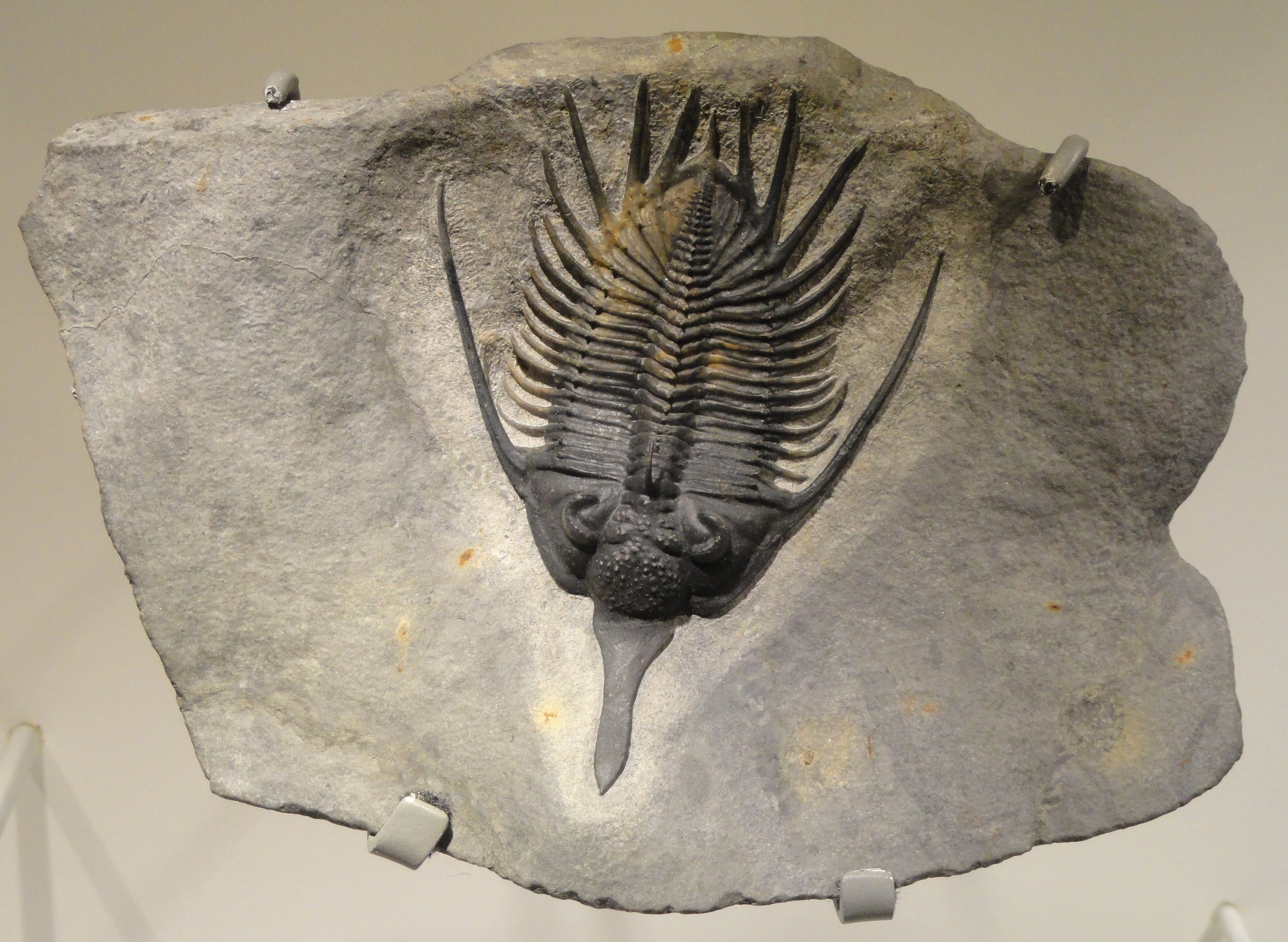
- Psychopyge elegans
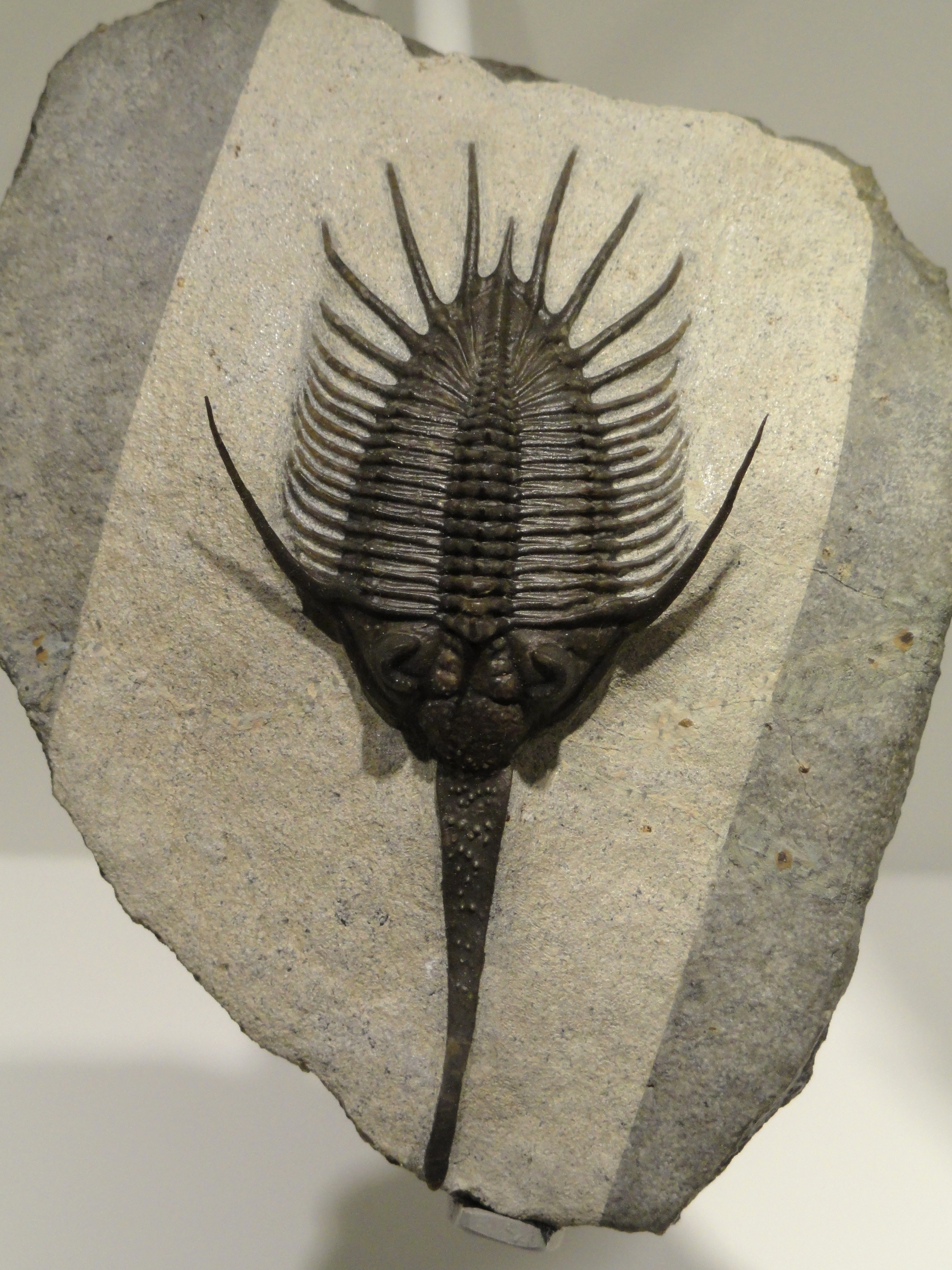
- Psychopyge termierorum

Scientific classification
- Domain: Eukaryota
- Kingdom: Animalia
- Phylum: Arthropoda
- Class: †Trilobita
- Order: †Phacopida
- Family: †Acastidae
- Genus: †Psychopyge; Termier & Termier, 1950

Species
- P. angeles Basse & Müller, 2016; P. elegans Termier & Termier, 1950 (type); P. hammerorum Chatterton et al., 2006; P. praestans Morzadec, 2001; P. psyche Basse, 2003; P. termierorum Morzadec, 2001

= Psychopyge =

Psychopyge Temporal range: Upper Emsian

Extinct genus of trilobites

Psychopyge is a genus of trilobites, that lived during the upper Emsian (or Lower Devonian) and has been found in Germany (P. psyche) and Morocco. It is characterized by the swordlike extension from the front of the head.

== Description ==
Like all sighted Phacopina, Psychopyge has schizochroal eyes, the frontal lobe of the central raised area of the headshield (or cephalon), called glabella is expanded forward, lacks a rostral plate (the midfrontal part of the “seam” visible from the ventral side, defined by sutures), and the articulate middle part of the exoskeleton (or thorax) has 11 segments. Like all Asteropyginae, Psychopyge has (in this case 5 pairs) prominent spines (or lappets) extending from the segments of the tailshield (or pygidium) in the area outside the axis (or pleural region). The frontal lobe of the glabella is rounded, the border carries a long flat sword-shaped forward pointing extension. The furrows dividing the frontal lobe of the glabella is curved inward and backward. The eyes have 9–10 lenses per vertical row (or dorsoventral file). The eye does not touch the border furrow at the back of the cephalon, and there is no platform below the eye. The large spines at the back corners of the cephalon (genal spines) are longer than glabella. There is a long vertical spine on the part of the glabella that corresponds with the border (called occipital ring), gradually curving backward. There are no spines between the genal spines and the glabella (or metafixigenal spines). The pygidium has 19-21 axial rings, each with a spine on its midpoint. The part of the pygidium outside the axis (or pleura) has 5–6 segments that get longer further to the back, with rounded pleural bands, clearly incised furrows between the bands and vertical spines near where each posterior band converts into a lappet. There are 5 pairs of lappets that grow only from the posterior pleural bands, and are longer than the corresponding pleural bands.

== Taxonomy ==
Psychopyge is most related to Quadrops, Saharops, and Walliserops. These genera share that the posterior pleural bands of the pygidium are much wider as the anterior band, the pleural segments are twice as wide near the base of the spine as at the axis and pygidial spines are connected only with the posterior pleural bands. Further in all these genera the pygidial spines are longer than the pleural segment, are round in section and are as wide as the posterior pleural bands. These genera also have inward and backward curved glabellar furrows and lateral borders developed on the genal spines, which are square in section.
