= Tolkienia =

Tolkienia Temporal range: Emsian

Scientific classification
- Kingdom: Animalia
- Phylum: Arthropoda
- Clade: †Artiopoda
- Class: †Trilobita
- Order: †Phacopida
- Family: †Acastidae
- Genus: †Tolkienia; Lieberman & Kloc 1997

Species
- †Tolkienia cancer Morzadec, 1983; †Tolkienia granulispina Morzadec, 1983; †Tolkienia nova Arbizu,1979

Extinct genus of Trilobite

Tolkienia is an extinct genus of trilobite in the family Acastidae. It consists of three species split from Comura based on morphological differences. The genus was present during the Emsian stage of the Early Devonian epoch around 400 Ma.

== Description ==
The front edge of the glabellar lobe is round when viewed from the top. There are very long furrows in the pygidium. The flaps in these furrows bulge outwards to the edges of the pygidium and have a pointed tip. The rearmost furrow is teardrop-shaped and does not reach as far to the rear as the other flaps. The pygidium becomes narrow to the rear of the sixth axial ring, and the tops of each segment are rounded. On the outside of the exoskeleton there is a prosopon made of small rounded projections.

== Taxonomy ==
Tolkienia was first described in 1997 by Bruce Lieberman and Gerald Kloc. The paleontologists named the genus for fantasy writer J. R. R. Tolkien, author of The Lord of the Rings. The genus was split from Comura because the morphology of its pygidium differed from the diagnostic description of Comura. However, no specimens of Comura are intact enough to be used for a phylogenetic analysis in comparison to the new species of Tolkienia, so its taxonomic status remains uncertain. T. granulispina, formerly Comura granulispina, was chosen as the type species for the genus because of the relative completeness of its fossils compared to the other species.

=== Species ===
- †Tolkienia cancer (Comura cancer) Morzadec, 1983
- †Tolkienia granulispina (Comura granulispina) Morzadec, 1983 – type species
- †Tolkienia nova Arbizu, 1979

In addition to the three accepted species, several other specimens have been doubtfully placed within Tolkienia. These include a partial fossil from Michigan previously placed in Greenops and a species proposed in 2003 by Martin Basse named †Tolkienia wiltzense.

== Ecology ==
Fossils of the genus have been extracted from the site of Neuerburg 1 in Germany, the Armorican Massif in France, and the Cantabrian Mountains in Spain. These trilobites were capable of fast movement, and would have lived on the surface of the benthic zone and preyed on small fauna.
