= Acastellina =

Acastellina Temporal range: Lower Devonian

Scientific classification
- Domain: Eukaryota
- Kingdom: Animalia
- Phylum: Arthropoda
- Class: †Trilobita
- Order: †Phacopida
- Family: †Acastidae
- Genus: †Acastellina; Richter & Richter, 1954

Species
- A. nolens (Richter & Richter, 1952) (type) synonym Acaste nolens; A. errabunda Basse 1998

Extinct genus of trilobites

Acastellina is a genus of minute trilobites in the order Phacopida, which existed in what is now Germany. It was described by Richter and Richter in 1954. The type species is Acastellina nolens, originally described as a species of Acastella.
