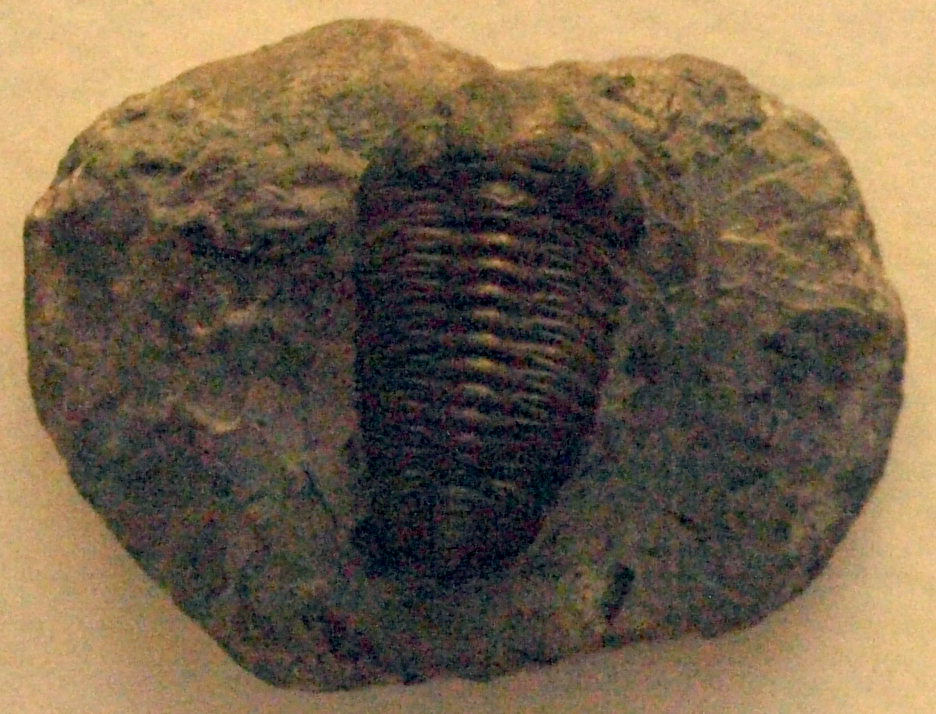
- Acaste downingiae, on display at the Natural History Museum, London

Scientific classification
- Domain: Eukaryota
- Kingdom: Animalia
- Phylum: Arthropoda
- Class: †Trilobita
- Order: †Phacopida
- Family: †Acastidae
- Genus: †Acaste; Goldfuss, 1843

Species
- A. downingiae (Murchison, 1843) (type) synonyms Calymene downingiae, Phacops downingiae var. α. vulgaris; A. dayiana R. Richter & E. Richter, 1954; A. inflata (Salter, 1864) synonym Phacops downingiae var. γ. inflatus; A. lokii Edgecombe, 1993 synonym A. longisulcata, pro parti (mixed collection); A. podolica Balashova, 1968; A. subcaudata (Murchison, 1839) synonyms Asaphus subcaudatus, A. cawdori; A. talebensis Hollard, 1963; A. zerinae Edgecombe, 1993

Synonyms
- Acastina

= Acaste (trilobite) =

Acaste Temporal range: 443–397 Ma Silurian to Devonian

Extinct genus of trilobites

Acaste is a genus of extinct trilobite of the order Phacopida which lived throughout the Silurian period (Wenlock Group). Though many species had been included, it now has only one species, Acaste downingiae. It is characterized by a convex dorsal surface, an absence of spines, a shortening of the head-shield and a general rounding off of all angles.

== Etymology ==
- A. lokii is named after Loki, the Norse god of mischief. Loki tricked the blind god Höðr to kill the god of beauty Baldr, and so started the demise of the world (or Ragnarök). This epithet was chosen by Edgecombe because it is based on the cephalon of A. longisulcata, which has turned out to be a mixed collection. The pygidium of A. longisulcata belongs to a Phacopoidea.
- A. zerinae is named in honor of Zerina Edgecombe, the wife of the species author.

== Taxonomy ==
=== Species previously assigned to Acaste ===
Some species originally designated to Acaste have now been reassigned to other genera.

- A. birminghamensis = Llandovacaste birminghamensis
- A. constrictus = Acastoides constricta
- A. cordobesa = Pennaia verneuili
- A. henni = Acastoides henni
- A. verneuili = Calmonia terrarocenai
