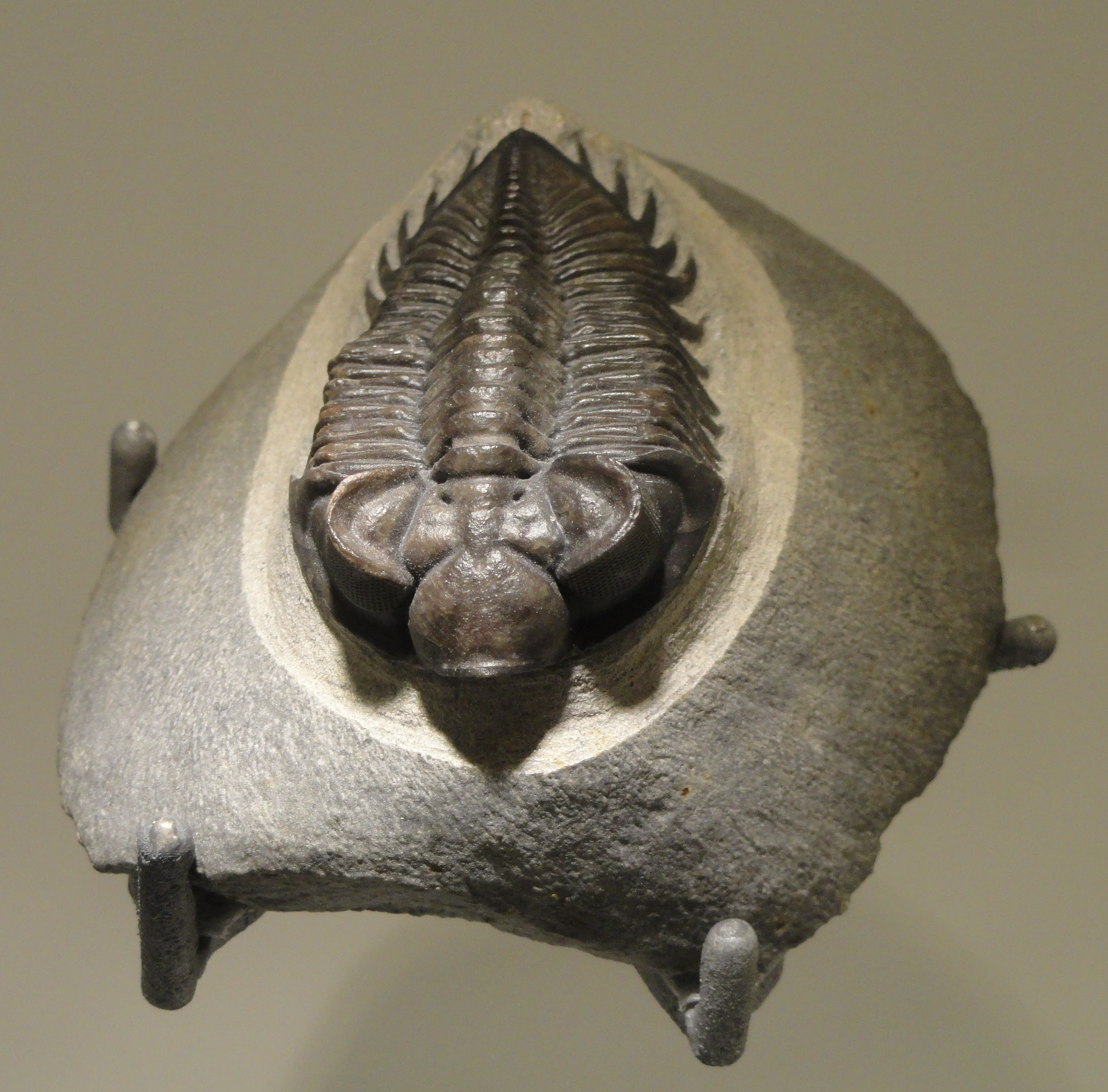
- Coltraneia oufatenensis

Scientific classification
- Kingdom: Animalia
- Phylum: Arthropoda
- Clade: †Artiopoda
- Class: †Trilobita
- Order: †Phacopida
- Suborder: †Phacopina
- Superfamily: †Acastoidea
- Family: †Acastidae; Delo, 1935

Subfamilies
- Acastinae Delo, 1935; Acastavinae Struve, 1958; Asteropyginae Delo, 1935

= Acastidae =

Acastidae Temporal range: Silurian –Famennian

Extinct family of trilobites

Acastidae is a family of trilobites in the order Phacopida, suborder Phacopina, superfamily Acastoidea, containing the following genera:

- Acastava
- Acaste
- Acastella
- Acastellina
- Acastocephala
- Acastoides
- Acastopyge
- Armorigreenops
- Asteropyge
- Baniaspis
- Bellacartwrightia
- Bradocryphaeus
- Braunops
- Breizhops
- Centauropyge
- Chimaerastella
- Coltraneia
- Comura
- Cryphina
- Delocare
- Deloops
- Destombesina
- Dunopyge
- Echinopyge
- Erbenochile
- Ewacaste
- Feruminops
- Gourdonia
- Greenops
- Gudralisium
- Hallandclarkeops
- Harringtonacaste
- Heliopyge
- Hexacosta
- Hollardops
- Kayserops
- Kennacryphaeus
- Kloucekia
- Llandovacaste
- Metacanthina
- Mimocryphaeus
- Minicryphaeus
- Morocconites
- Mrakibina
- Neocalmonia
- Neometacanthus
- Paracryphaeus
- Pelitlina
- Phacopidina
- Philonyx
- Pilletina
- Protacanthina
- Pseudocryphaeus
- Psychopyge
- Quadratispina
- Quadrops
- Radiopyge
- Rheicops
- Rhenops
- Saharops
- Sanidopyge
- Scotiella
- Sokhretia
- Stummiana
- Talus
- Tolkienia
- Treveropyge
- Turcopyge
- Walliserops
