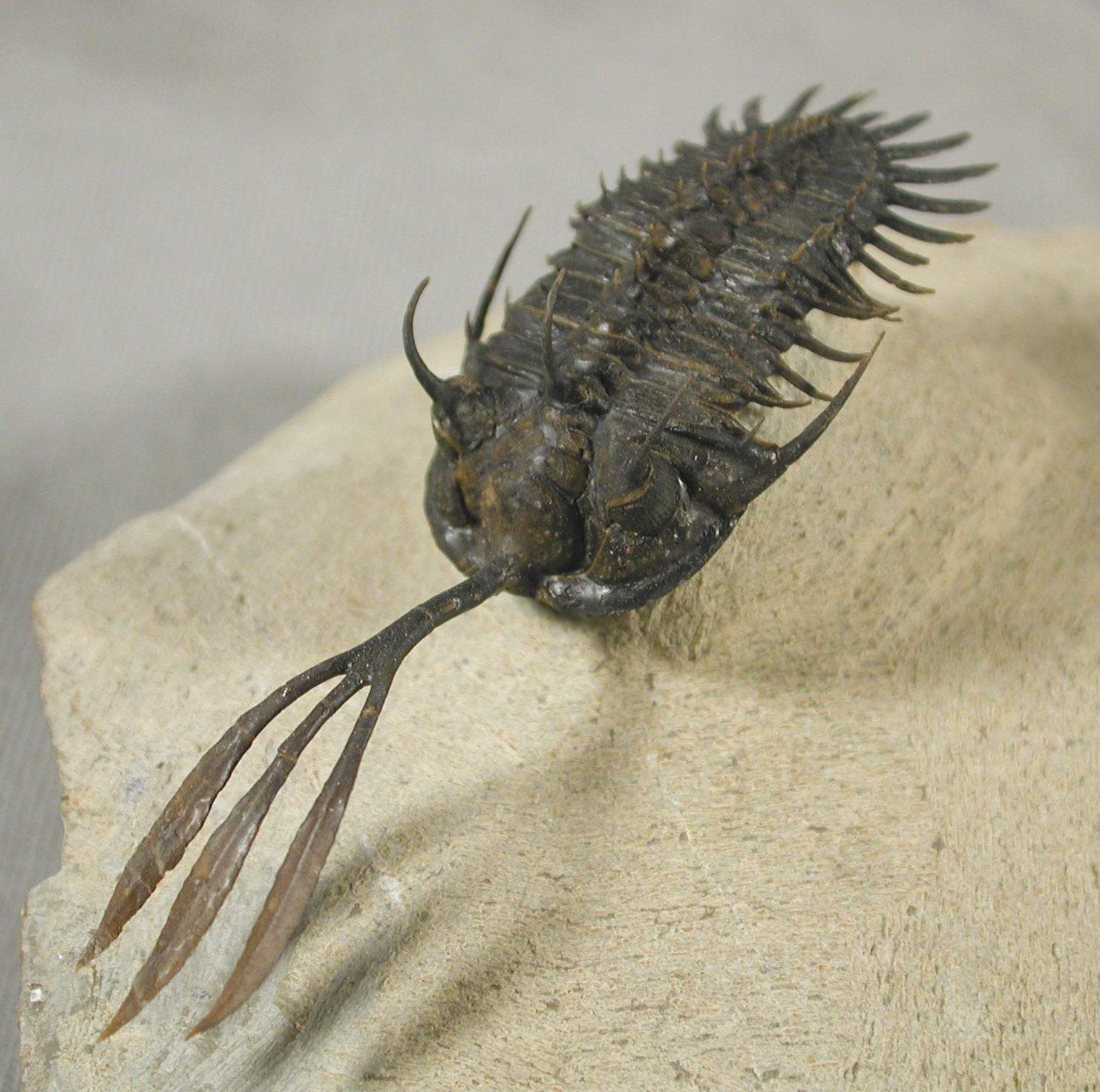
- Walliserops trifurcatus

Scientific classification
- Domain: Eukaryota
- Kingdom: Animalia
- Phylum: Arthropoda
- Class: †Trilobita
- Order: †Phacopida
- Suborder: †Phacopina
- Superfamily: †Acastoidea; Reijers, 1972

Families
- Acastidae; Calmoniidae

= Acastoidea =

Acastoidea Temporal range: Tremadocian–Famennian

Acastoidea is a superfamily of trilobites from the order Phacopida, suborder Phacopina. This superfamily is divided into two families, Acastidae and Calmoniidae. This superfamily is distinguishable from the Phacopidae in that eyes are closer to the glabella and that the glabella has lobes, unlike the genera in Phacopidae. Acastoidea was first proposed by T.J.A. Reijers in 1972.
