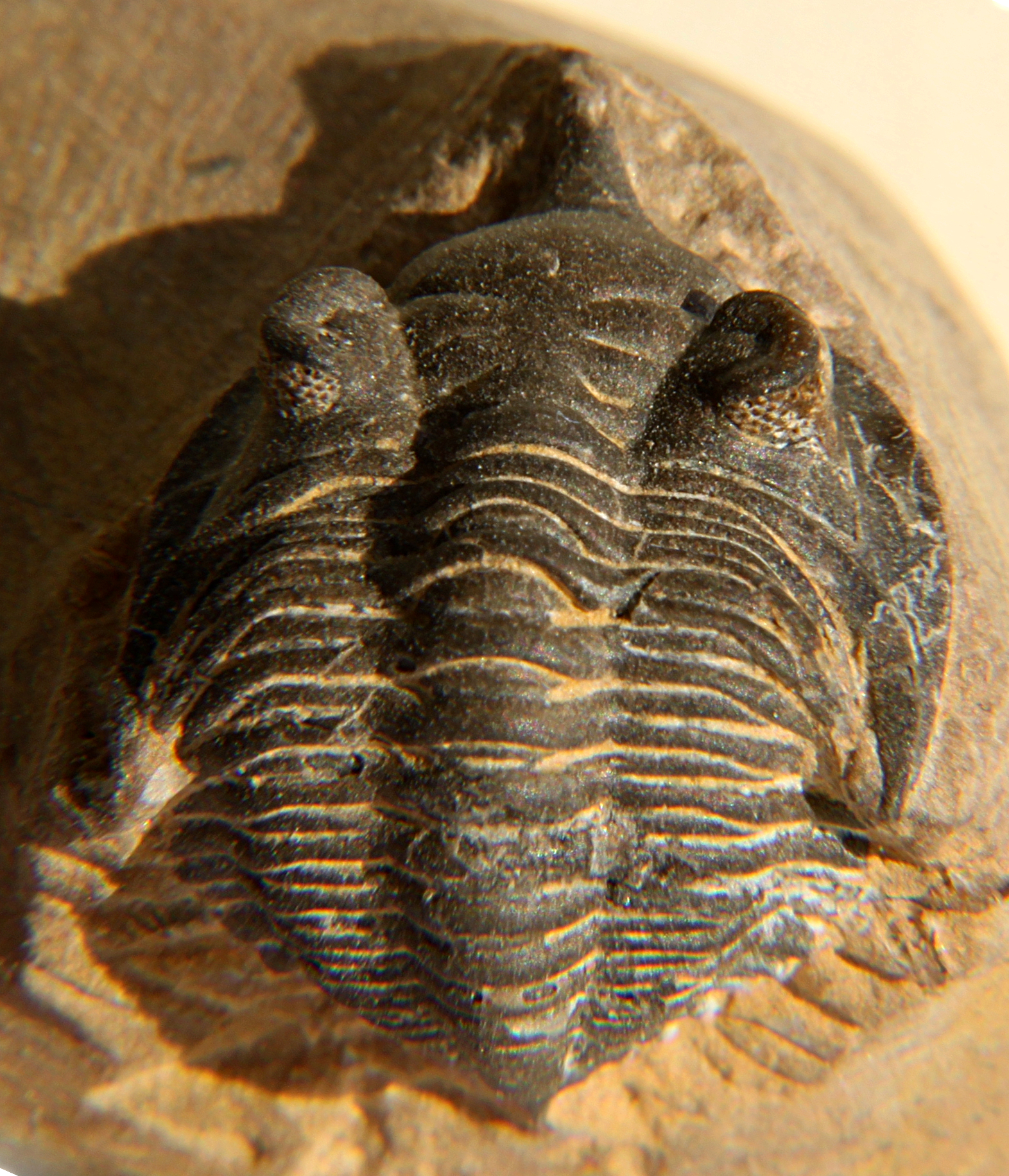
- Minicryphaeus minimus, 25 mm including spines
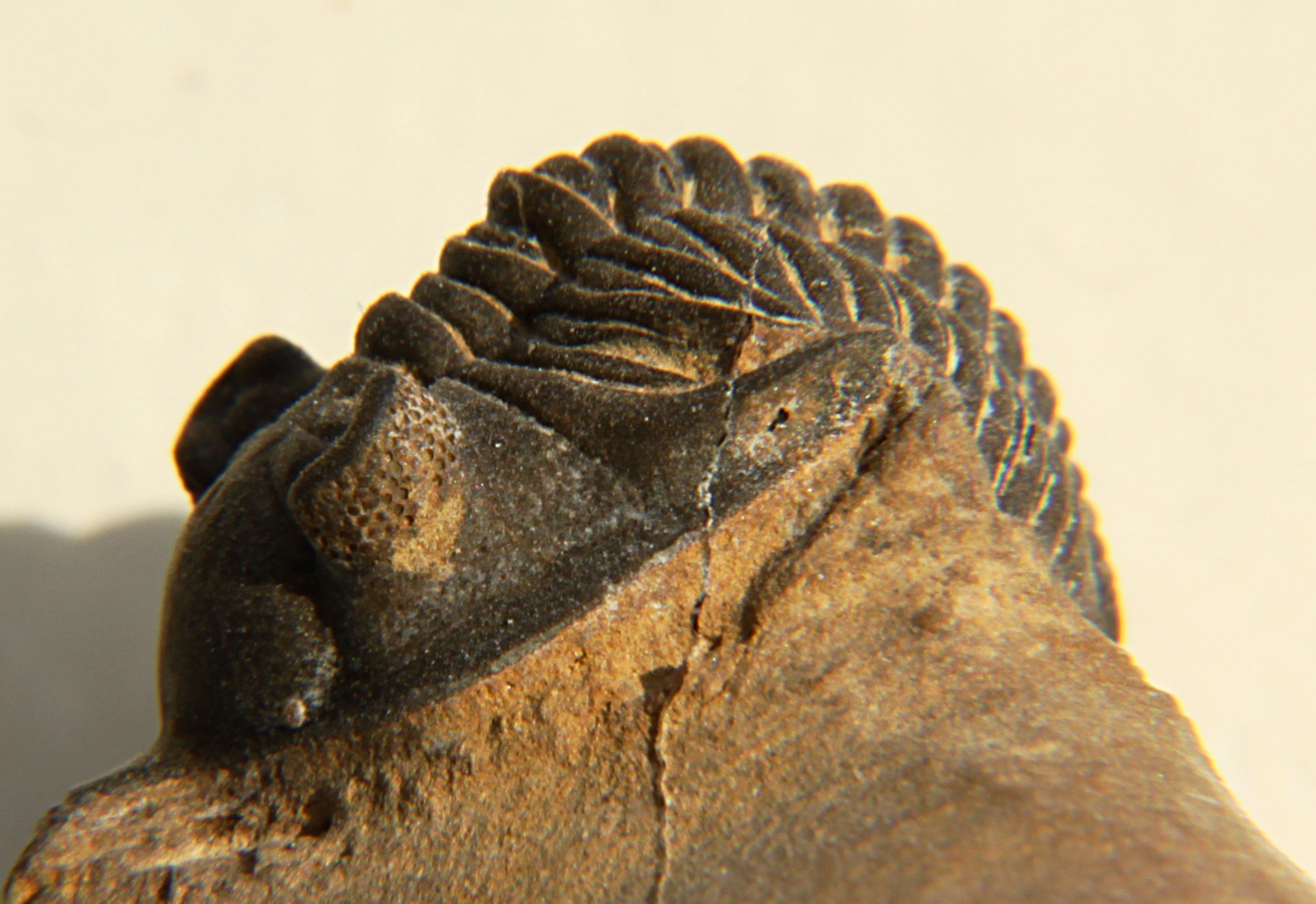

Scientific classification
- Domain: Eukaryota
- Kingdom: Animalia
- Phylum: Arthropoda
- Class: †Trilobita
- Order: †Phacopida
- Family: †Acastidae
- Genus: †Minicryphaeus; Bignon & Crônier, 2013

Species
- M. minimus (Morzadec, 2001) (type) = Pseudocryphaeus minimus; M. quaterspinosus (Morzadec, 2001) = Pseudocryphaeus quaterspinosus; M. sarirus (Morzadec, 2001) = Pseudocryphaeus sarirus; M. giganteus Bignon, Corbacho & López-Soriano (2014)

= Minicryphaeus =

Minicryphaeus Temporal range: Late Lower Devonian Pragian

Extinct genus of trilobites

Minicryphaeus is a genus of trilobite that lived during the Pragian in what is today Morocco (Anti-Atlas).

== Etymology ==
The name of this genus is a combination of the type species epithet minimus, with the genus it was originally assigned to, Pseudocryphaeus.

- M. minimus was so-called for its small size compared to species of Pseudocryphaeus.
- M. quaterspinosus is named after the fact that it has only four pairs of pygidial lappets.

== Description ==
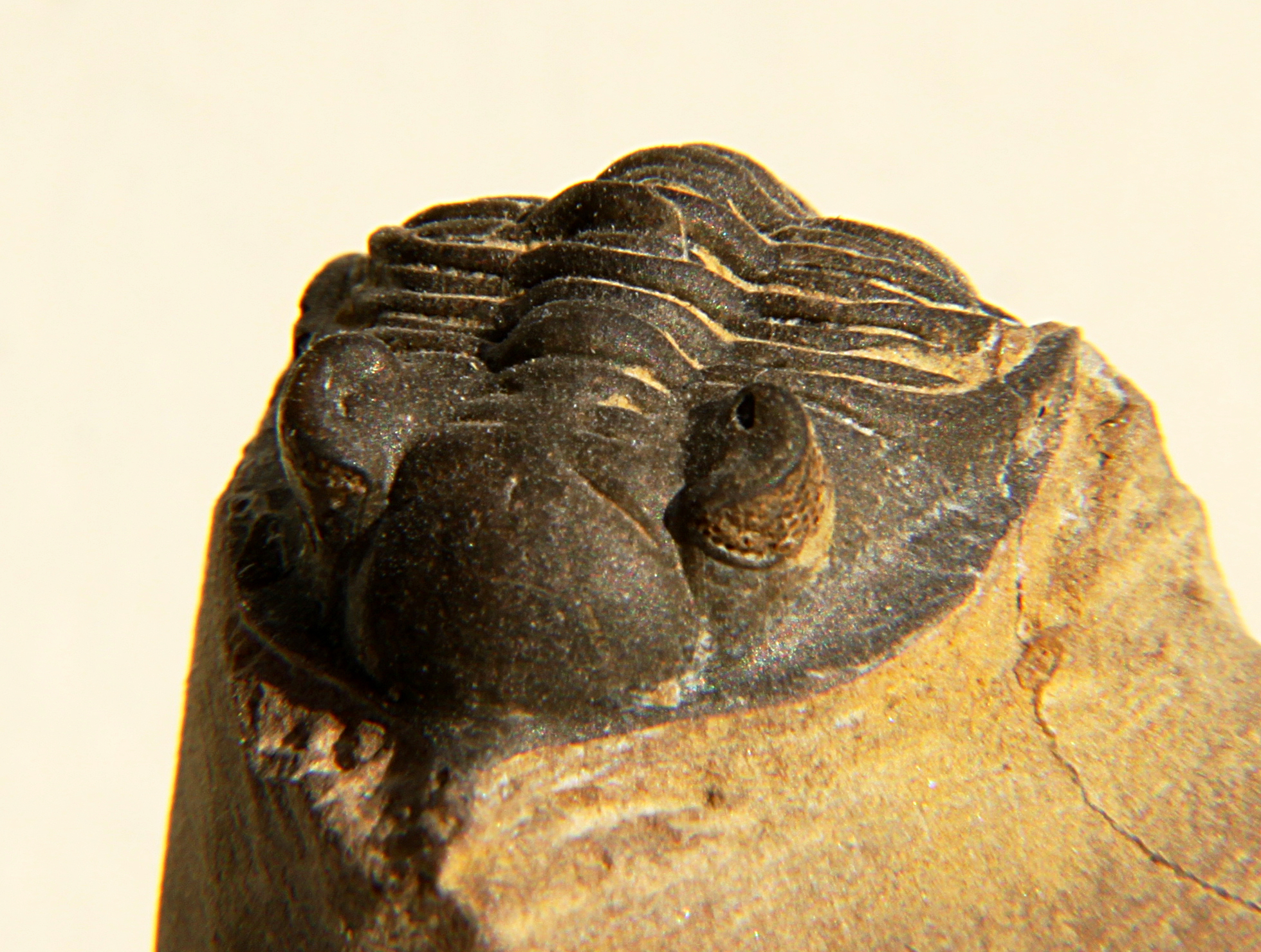
Frontal view with rostrum, note that the border is narrow in front of the glabella and a wide next to the eye

The headshield (or cephalon) may have a spine sticking forward from its border. The most forward lobe of the central raised area of the cephalon (or glabella) is diamond shaped. The eye has 5–8 lenses per vertical row (or dorso-ventral file). The spines at the back corners of the cephalon (genal spines) are shorter than glabella and narrow over the entire length. The border is not defined by a furrow, narrow at the front, but very wide at the sides of the cephalon and hardly defined on the genal spines. The tailshield (or pygidium) has 5 pleural segments in each of which the frontal pleural bands are as wide and elevated as the posterior bands, and both are flat. The axis has 7–10 rings. The 4 or 5 pairs of lateral pygidial spines (or lappets) are shorter than the area outside the axis (or pleural region) is wide, and they are mainly connected to the posterior pleural bands. The terminal pygidial spine slightly wider than axis, roughly triangular, twice as long as other pygidial spines.

== Taxonomy ==
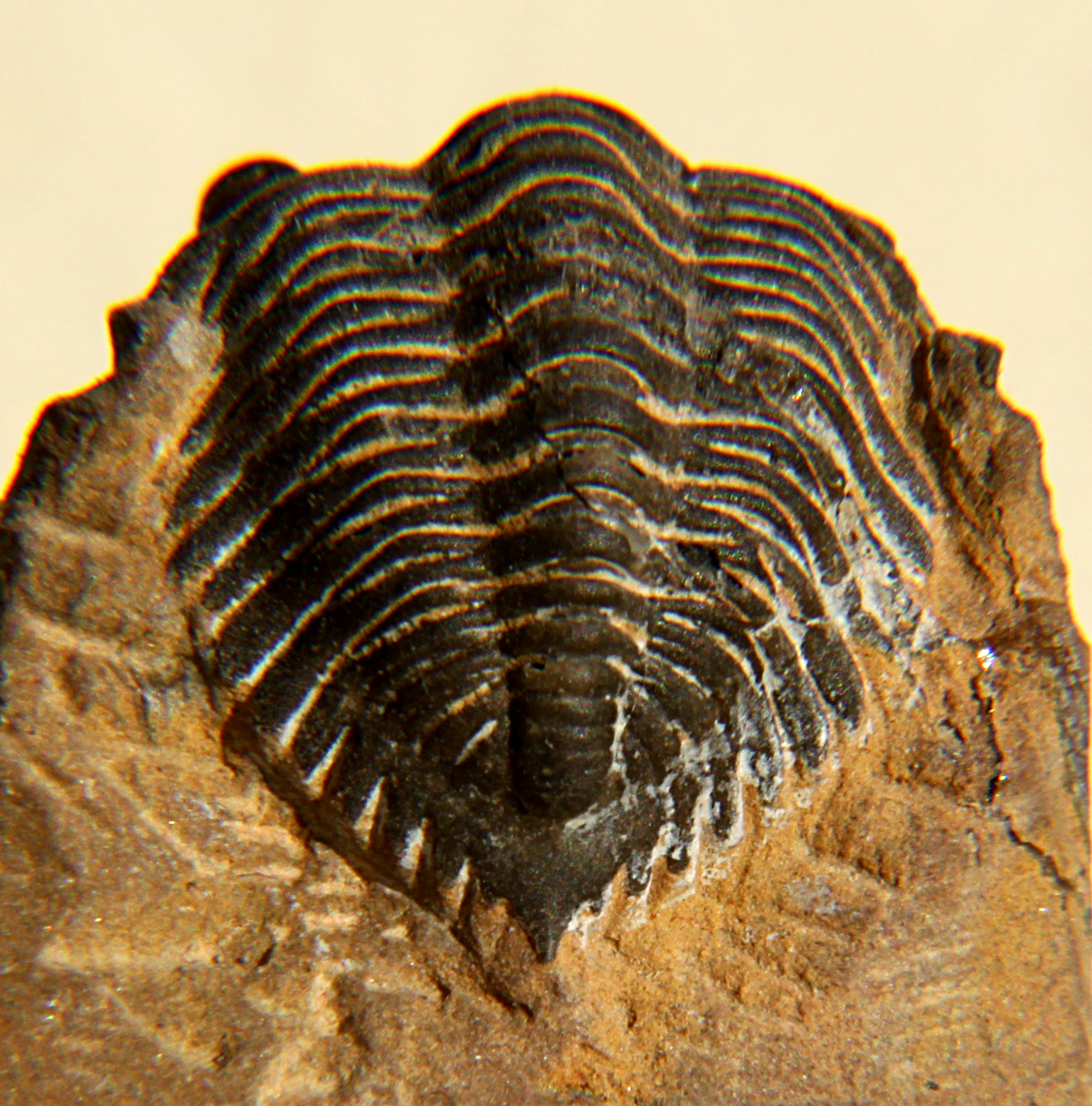
Pygidium of Minicryphaeus minimus, showing the lateral and terminal lappets

Minicryphaeus was split-off from Pseudocryphaeus. The main differences are that in Minicryphaeus the genal spines are about 75% of the length of the glabella, the spaces between the lateral pygidial lappets are V-shaped, and the terminal spine is triangular and longer than the other lappets. In Pseudocryphaeus the genal spines are about half as long as the glabella, the spaces between the lappets are U-shaped, and the terminal spine is pentangular.
