= Feruminops =

Scientific classification
- Domain: Eukaryota
- Kingdom: Animalia
- Phylum: Arthropoda
- Class: †Trilobita
- Order: †Phacopida
- Family: †Acastidae
- Genus: †Feruminops; Haas, 1968

Extinct genus of trilobites

Feruminops is a trilobite in the order Phacopida, that existed during the lower Devonian in what is now Turkey. It was described by Haas in 1968, and the type species is Feruminops crepida. The type locality was the Dede Formation.
