= Breizhops =

Scientific classification
- Domain: Eukaryota
- Kingdom: Animalia
- Phylum: Arthropoda
- Class: †Trilobita
- Order: †Phacopida
- Family: †Acastidae
- Genus: †Breizhops; Morzadec, 1983

Genus of trilobites in the order Phacopida

Breizhops is a genus of trilobite in the order Phacopida, which existed in what is now Brittany, France. It was described by Morzadec in 1983, and the type species is Breizhops lanceolatus.
