= Echinopyge =

Scientific classification
- Domain: Eukaryota
- Kingdom: Animalia
- Phylum: Arthropoda
- Class: †Trilobita
- Order: †Phacopida
- Family: †Acastidae
- Genus: †Echinopyge; Haas, 1968

Echinopyge is a trilobite in the order Phacopida, that existed during the lower Devonian in what is now Turkey. It was described by Haas in 1968, and the type species is Echinopyge cathamma. The type locality was the Kurtdogmus Formation.
