= Delocare =

Scientific classification
- Domain: Eukaryota
- Kingdom: Animalia
- Phylum: Arthropoda
- Class: †Trilobita
- Order: †Phacopida
- Family: †Acastidae
- Genus: †Delocare; Struve, 1958

Delocare is a trilobite in the order Phacopida, that existed during the lower Devonian in what is now Germany. It was described by Struve in 1958, and the type species is Delocare boopis, which was originally described under the genus Cryphaeys by Richter in 1909. The type locality was in the Eifel mountain range.
