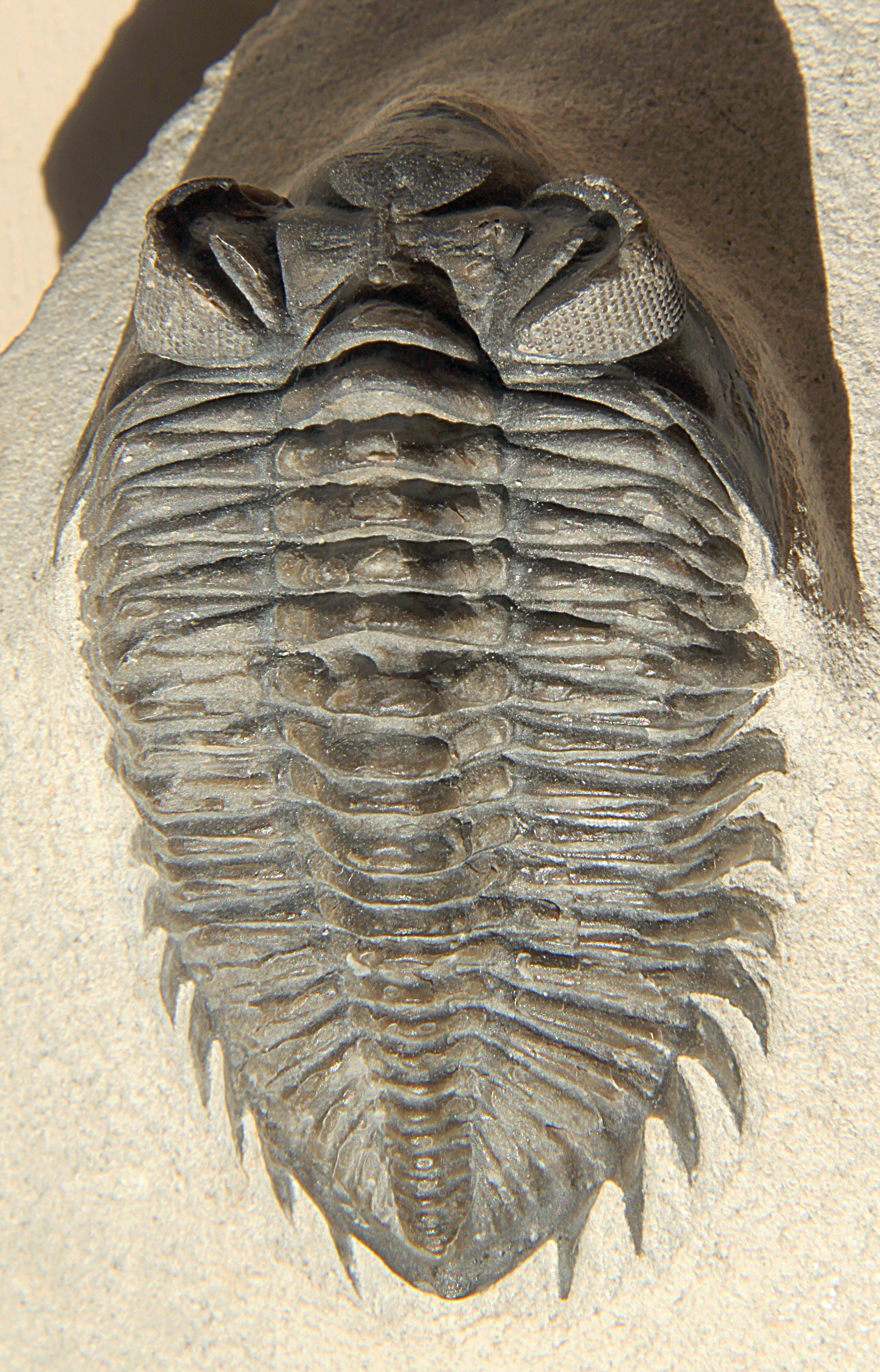
- Coltraneia oufatenensis, 69mm

Scientific classification
- Domain: Eukaryota
- Kingdom: Animalia
- Phylum: Arthropoda
- Class: †Trilobita
- Order: †Phacopida
- Family: †Acastidae
- Genus: †Coltraneia; Lieberman & Kloc, 1997

Species
- C. celtica (Morzadec, 1969) (type) = Treveropyge celtica; C. effelesa Chatterton et al., 2006; C. henryi (Smeenk, 1983); C. leunisseni Basse, 2003; C. oufatenensis Morzadec, 2001; C. saourensis (Morzadec, 1997) = Treveropyge saourensis

= Coltraneia =

Coltraneia Temporal range: Upper Emsian and Lower Eifelian

Genus of trilobite

Coltraneia is a genus of trilobites, that lived during the upper Emsian and lower Eifelian, and has been found in Algeria, France, Germany, Morocco and Spain.

== Description ==
The frontal lobe of the central raised area of the headshield (or glabella) is rounded. The furrow defining the glabella is curved behind the frontal lobe. Both lobes directly behind the frontal lobe (L3 and L2) are more elevated than the lobe (L1) just in front of the occipital ring (L0). All sighted phacopina have schizochroal eyes, but in Coltraneia these are particularly large with 13–14 lenses in each of the vertical rows (or dorsoventral file) at midlength. The front of these eyes almost touches the furrow separating the frontal from the following lobe, while the back of the eyes touch the posterior border furrow. The axis of the tailshield (or pygidium) has 13 to 15 rings, and is constricted between the 6th and 7th rings. In the pleural region to the side of the pygidial axis, 8–11 segments can be identified. The five pairs of pygidial spines (or lappets) extend from both the anterior and posterior pleural bands. These lappets are shorter than the corresponding pleural segments, narrow and pointed, more so further to the back. The terminal medial spine is so short, it almost is confluent with the lateral edge of the pygidium between the spines.

Coltraneia oufatenensis

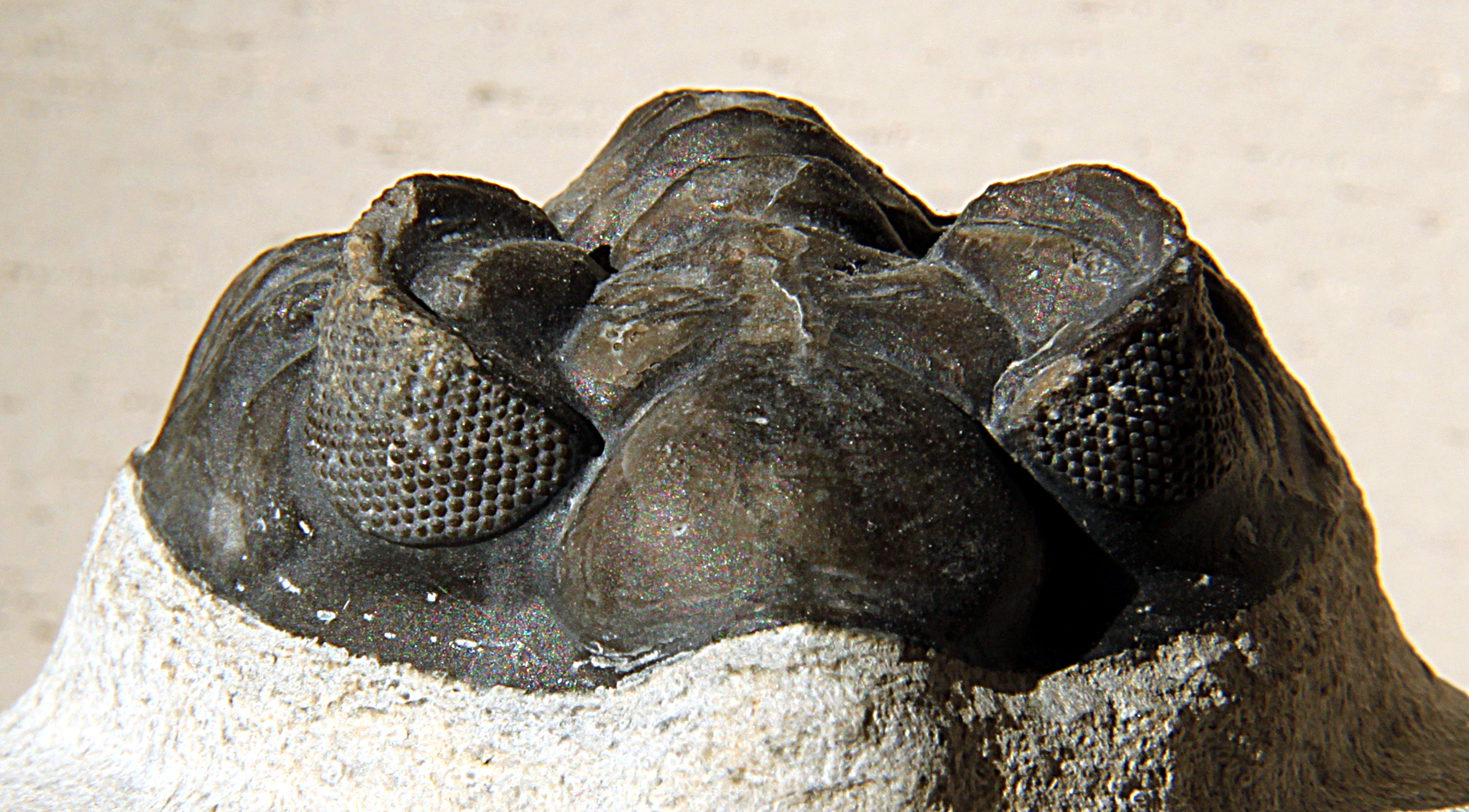
Coltraneia's anterior border is arched

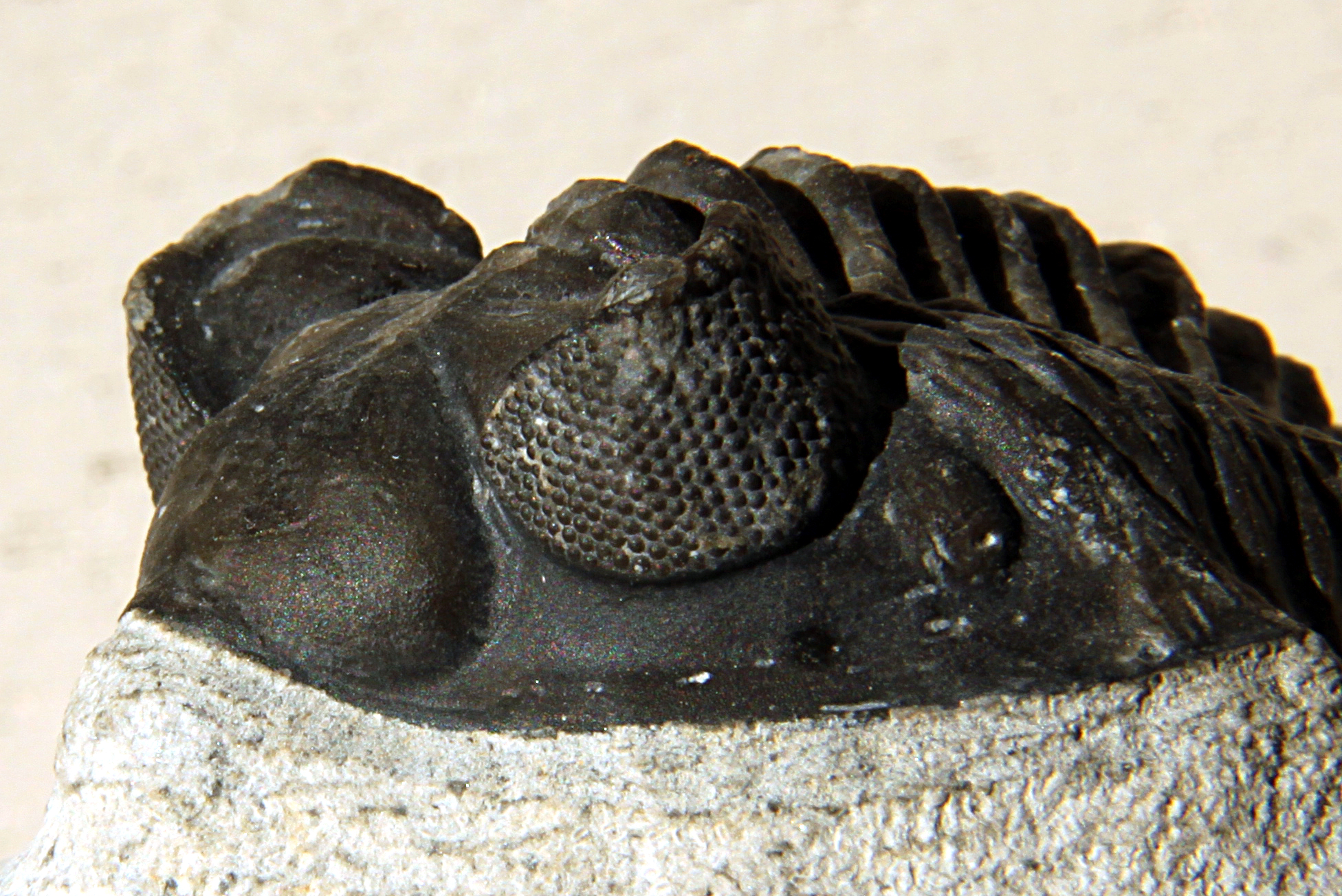
Eye

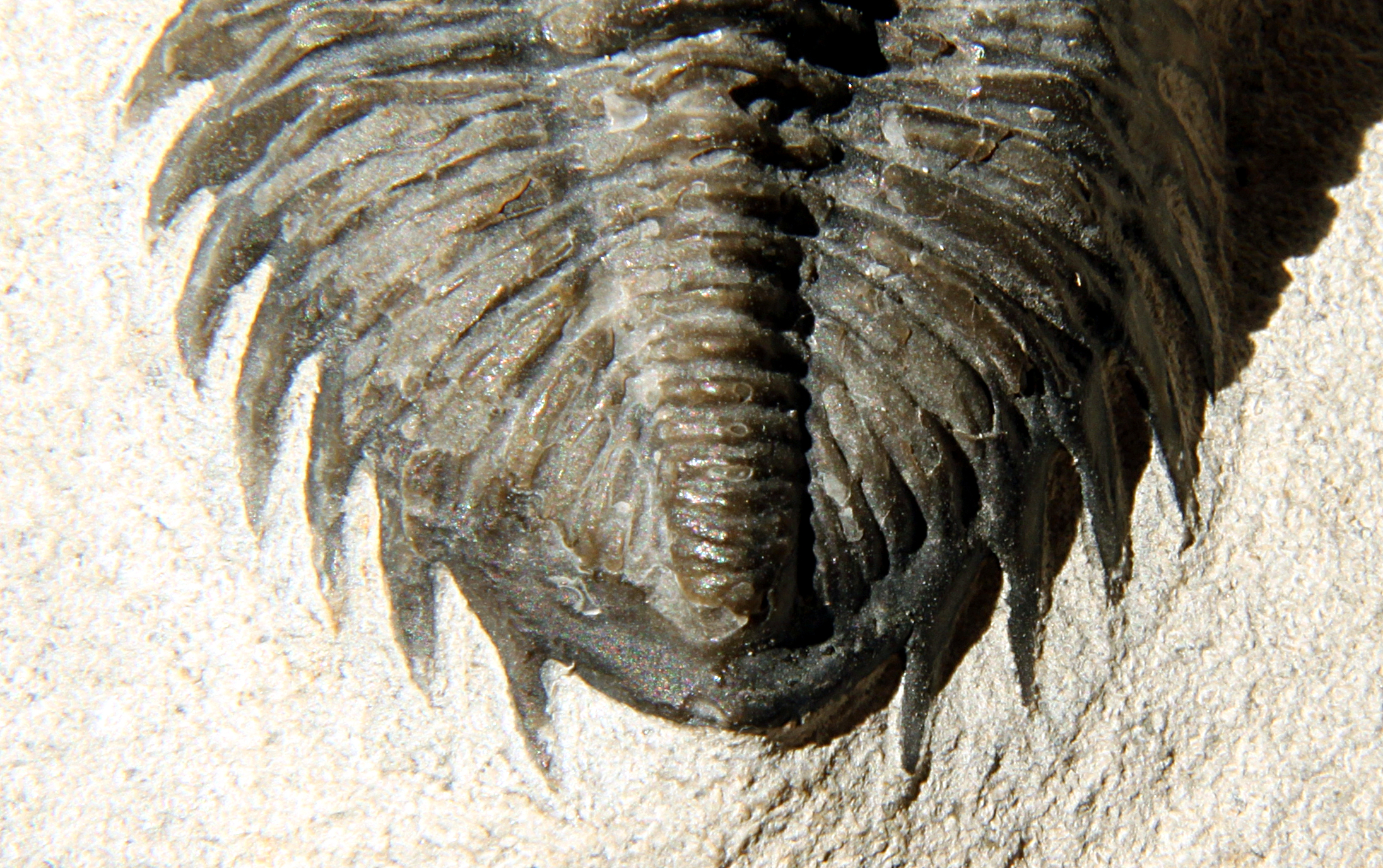
Pygidium

== Taxonomy ==
Coltraneia is most related to Treveropyge from which it differs by larger eyes with 13-14 lenses per file, rather than 8-12 lenses. Treveropyge only has 12-13 pygidial rings with a constriction between the 4th and 5th ring, and lappets as long as the corresponding pleural segments, while the terminal medial spine is short but triangular. Viewed from the front the anterior border in Treveropyge is straight, while in Coltraneia it is arched upwards like a fold in a rug.

== Etymology ==
Coltraneia is named for the jazz saxophonist John Coltrane.
