= Gourdonia =

Scientific classification
- Domain: Eukaryota
- Kingdom: Animalia
- Phylum: Arthropoda
- Class: †Trilobita
- Order: †Phacopida
- Family: †Acastidae
- Genus: †Gourdonia; Pillet, 1954

Gourdonia is a trilobite in the order Phacopida (family Acastidae), that existed during the middle Devonian in what is now France. It was described by Pillet in 1954, and the type species is Gourdonia gourdoni, which was originally described under the genus Dalmanites by Barrois in 1883. The generic name is derived from the species epithet. The type locality was the Cathervielle Shale in the Pyrenees mountains.
