= Hexacosta =

Scientific classification
- Domain: Eukaryota
- Kingdom: Animalia
- Phylum: Arthropoda
- Class: †Trilobita
- Order: †Phacopida
- Family: †Acastidae
- Genus: †Hexacosta; Farsan, 1981

Hexacosta is a trilobite in the order Phacopida (family Acastidae), that existed during the middle Devonian in what is now Afghanistan. It was described by Farsan in 1981, and the type species is Hexacosta zendadjanensis.
