= Cryphina =

Scientific classification
- Domain: Eukaryota
- Kingdom: Animalia
- Phylum: Arthropoda
- Class: †Trilobita
- Order: †Phacopida
- Family: †Acastidae
- Genus: †Cryphina; Oehlert, 1889

Genus of trilobites (fossil)

Cryphina is a trilobite in the order Phacopida, that existed during the lower Devonian in what is now France. It was described by D. Oehlert in 1889, and the type species is Cryphina andegavensis. It was described from Saint-Barthélemy-d'Anjou near Angers, Anjou.
