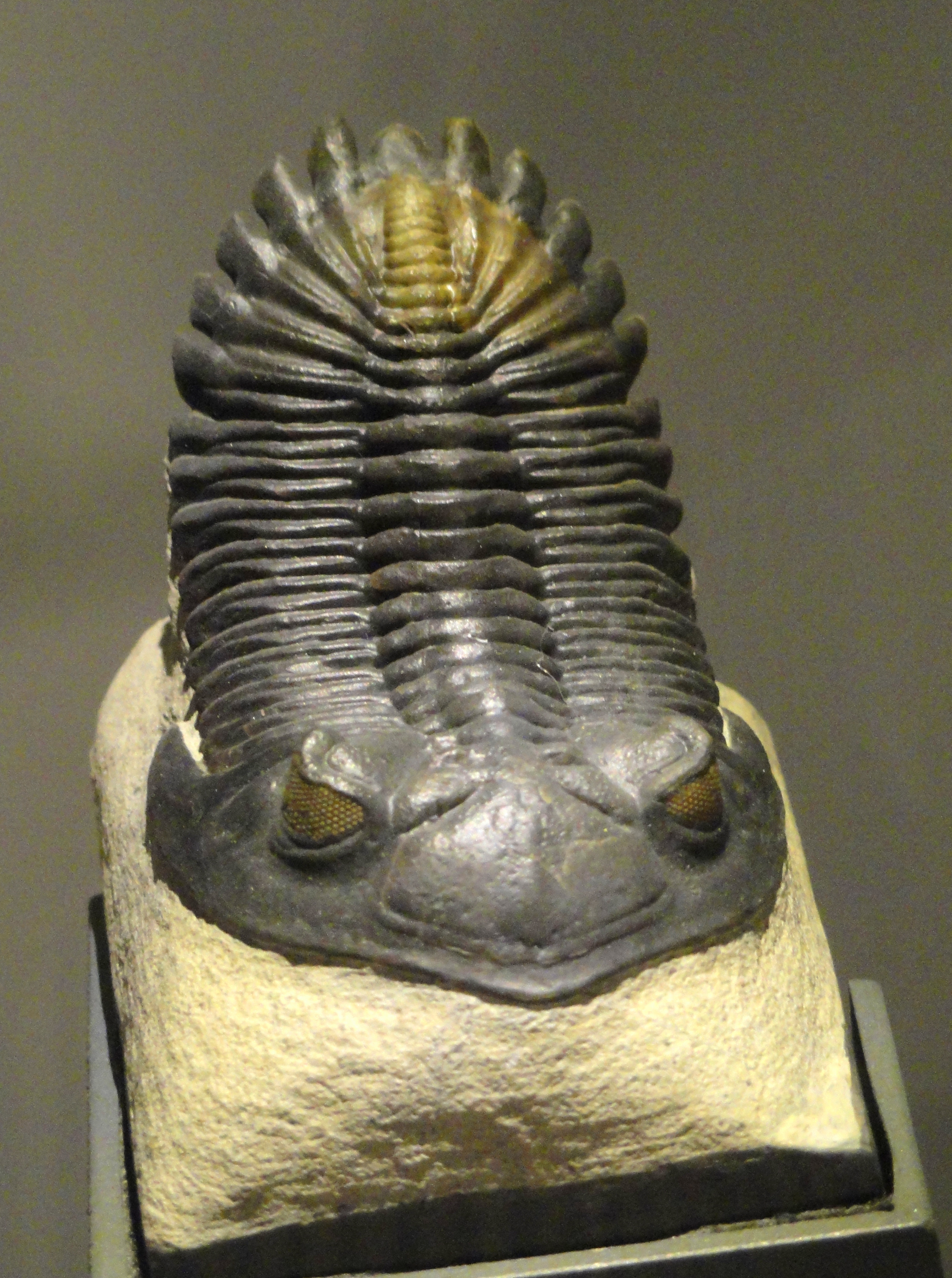
- Hollardops sp. Houston Museum of Natural Science - DSC01602

Scientific classification
- Domain: Eukaryota
- Kingdom: Animalia
- Phylum: Arthropoda
- Class: †Trilobita
- Order: †Phacopida
- Family: †Acastidae
- Genus: †Hollardops; Morzadec, 1997

Species
- Asteropyge mesocristata Le Maître, 1952; H. aithassainorum Chatterton et al., 2006; H. angustifrons Van Viersen & Kloc, 2022; Rhenops babini Morzadec, 1983; Philipsmithiana burtandmimiae Lieberman & Kloc, 1997; H. boudibensis Morzadec, 2001; Rhenops circumapodemus Smeenk, 1983; Philipsmithiana hyfinkeli Lieberman & Kloc, 1997; H. kyriarchos Van Viersen & Kloc, 2022; H. klugi Van Viersen & Kloc, 2022; H. luscus Van Viersen & Kloc, 2022; H. multatuli Van Viersen & Kloc, 2022; Greenops struvei Morzadec, 1969

= Hollardops =

Hollardops Temporal range: Emsian–Eifelian

Extinct genus of trilobites

Hollardops is a genus of trilobite in the order Phacopida that lived during the Devonian. Their fossils are found in the upper Emsian of western Europe (France, Spain) and in the lower Emsian to lowermost Eifelian of North Africa (Morocco, Algeria). The type species, Asteropyge mesocristata, was described from Algeria by Le Maître in 1952. The genus Hollardops was erected by Morzadec in 1997. In the same year, Lieberman & Kloc erected Modellops and Philipsmithiana but those genera are regarded as subjective synonyms of Hollardops. The 10-segmented thoracic condition of Hollardops is a rare feature among acastid trilobites that almost always have 11 thorax segments. Van Viersen & Kloc (2022) revisited Hollardops and described a number of new species from the Devonian of Morocco. They also regarded Pennarbedops Bignon & Crônier, 2013 as a synonym of Hollardops. Van Viersen & Kloc construed Hollardops as a scavenger or predator with well-developed eyes, that used its shovel-like cephalon to plough the top layers of the sediment in search of food. Hollardops had small pits horizontally along the fringe of the exoskeleton; these are believed to have housed setae that allowed the trilobite to closely monitor its surroundings.

== Description ==
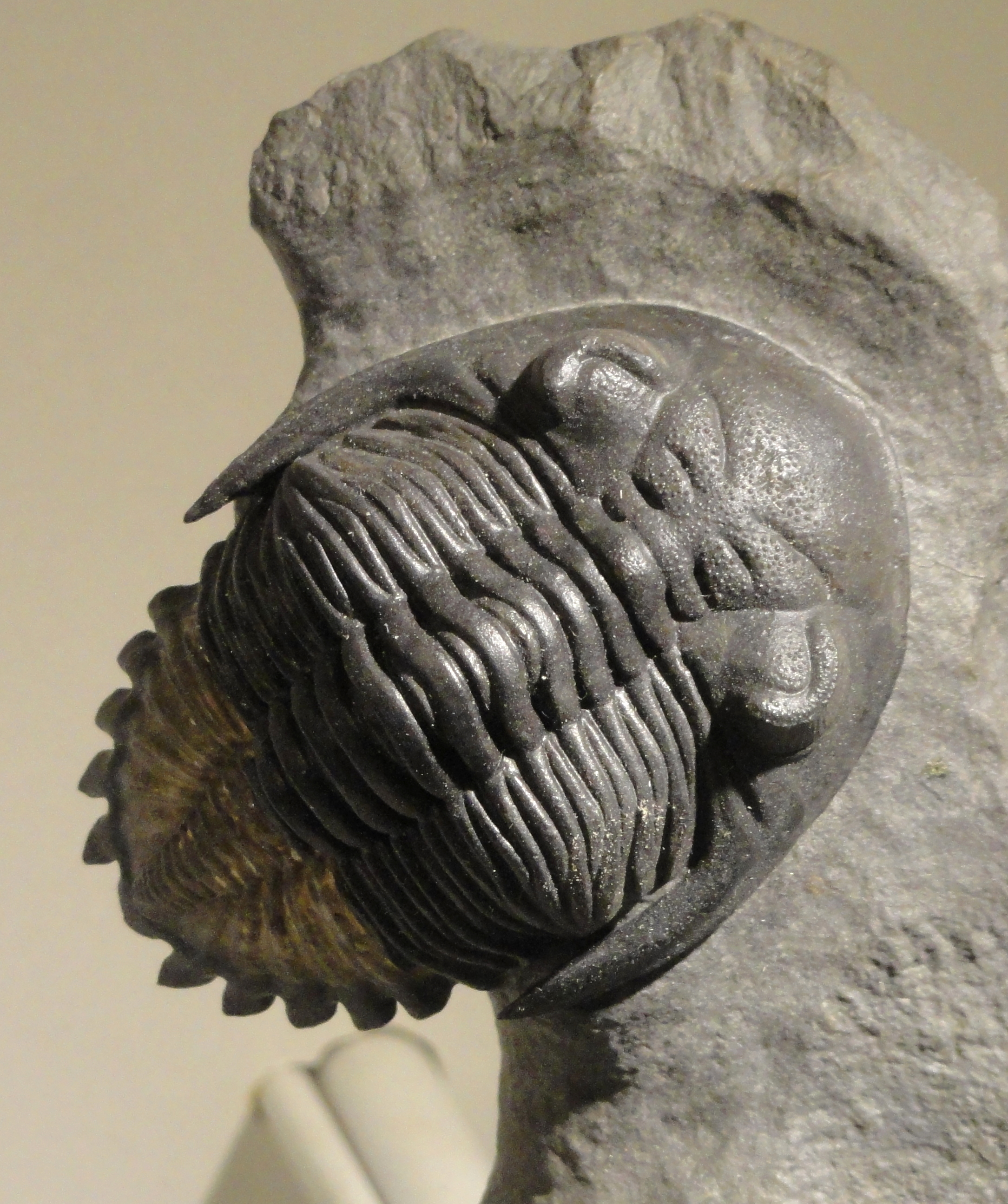
Hollardops sp. Houston Museum of Nat. Sci. - DSC01611 Both specimen are from Tazoulait Formation at Jbel (Jebel) Oufatène 30.8374368°N 4.9018067°W and Issimour 30.9669834°N 5.0373266°W SE of Alnif, western of Oued Alnif, Ma'ider region, Morocco

Hollardops have schizochroal eyes and a glabella that is slightly raised on the surface of the cephalon. Genal spines extend from the cephalon and extend to approximately the 6th thoracic segment.

Hollardops has 10 thoracic segments and also has 5 pairs of pleural lappets or spines projecting from the pygidium.

Length ranges from approximately 3 to 9 cm.
