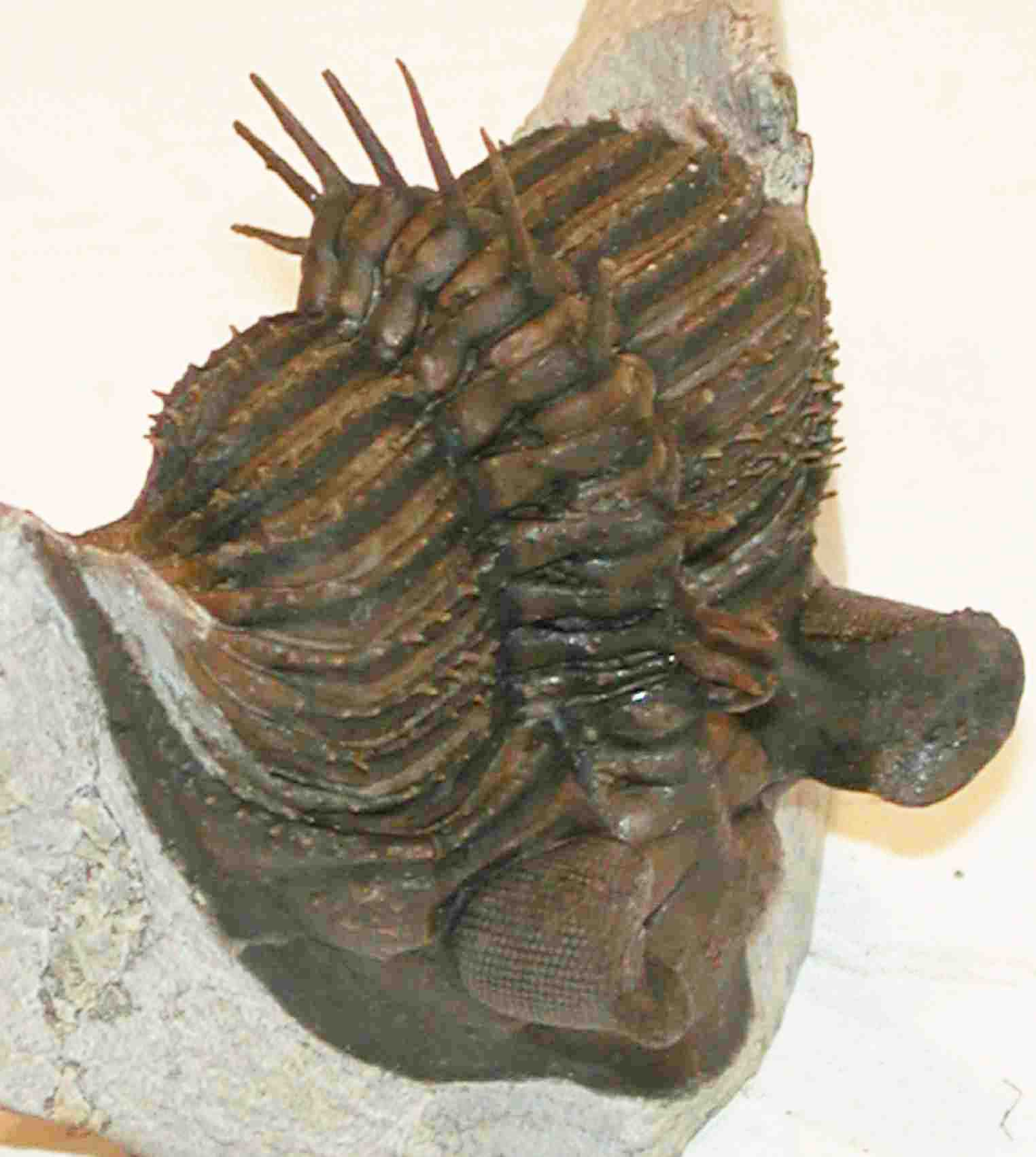
- Erbenochile erbeni

Scientific classification
- Kingdom: Animalia
- Phylum: Arthropoda
- Clade: †Artiopoda
- Class: †Trilobita
- Order: †Phacopida
- Family: †Acastidae
- Genus: †Erbenochile; Morzadec, 1995

Type species
- Odontochile (Erbenochile) erbeni Alberti, 1981

Species
- E. erbeni Alberti, 1981 (type), = Odontochile (Erbenochile) erbeni; E. issoumourensis Chatterton & Gibb, 2010

= Erbenochile =

Erbenochile Temporal range: Emsian to Eifelian

Extinct genus of trilobites

Erbenochile is a genus of spinose phacopid trilobite, of the family Acastidae, found in Lower to Middle Devonian age rocks from Algeria and Morocco. Originally described from an isolated pygidium (the posterior body part or shield), the first complete articulated specimen of E. erbeni revealed the presence of extraordinarily tall eyes:

"Straight-sided towers of lenses... with [up to] 18 lenses in a vertical file"

— Fortey & Chatterton (2003)

Number of lenses has been estimated at 560 or 450 incomplete preservation accounting for the uncertainty. A lens count of 18 lenses per file is unusually high (twice that of closely related genus) and accounts for the height of the eye, as opposed to a noticeable increase in the size of the individual lenses. A recently found species (E. issoumourensis) has smaller eyes, with fewer files (33–35) and fewer lenses per file (13–14 max) than E. erbeni. E. erbeni eyes allow full 360 degree coverage in the horizontal plane and were high enough to allow the trilobite to see backwards over its thorax. The presence of eye shades, blocking glare from over head, validates the suggestion that (at least some) trilobites were diurnal and not nocturnal,

"a detail of life habit which had previously been equivocal: Eyeshades are no use in the dark."

— Fortey & Chatterton (2003)

== Distribution ==
- E. erbeni has been found in the latest Lower Devonian of Algeria (upper Emsian strata at Ougarta) and Morocco (Timrhanrhart Formation at section Foum Zguid III).
- E. issoumourensis is known from the latest Lower Devonian or possibly earliest middle Devonian of Morocco (upper Emsian or lower Eifelian, Erbenochile bed, El Otfal Formation, Jbel Issoumour, near Alnif southeastern Morocco 30°58'14.5 N - 05°01'44.3W).

== Description ==
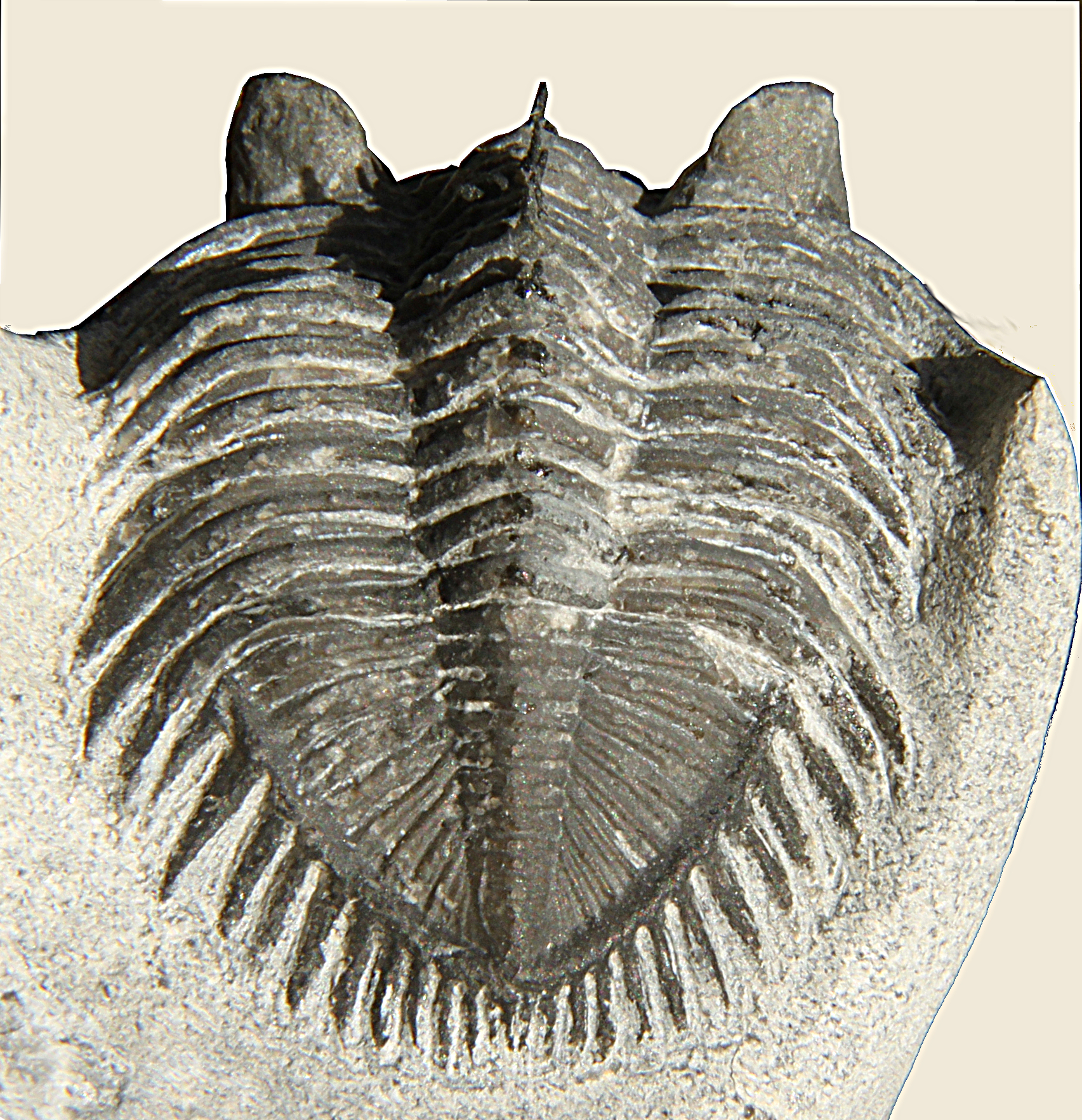
Erbenochile issoumourensis, from Foum Zgid, Morocco, late Emsian, 45mm body length

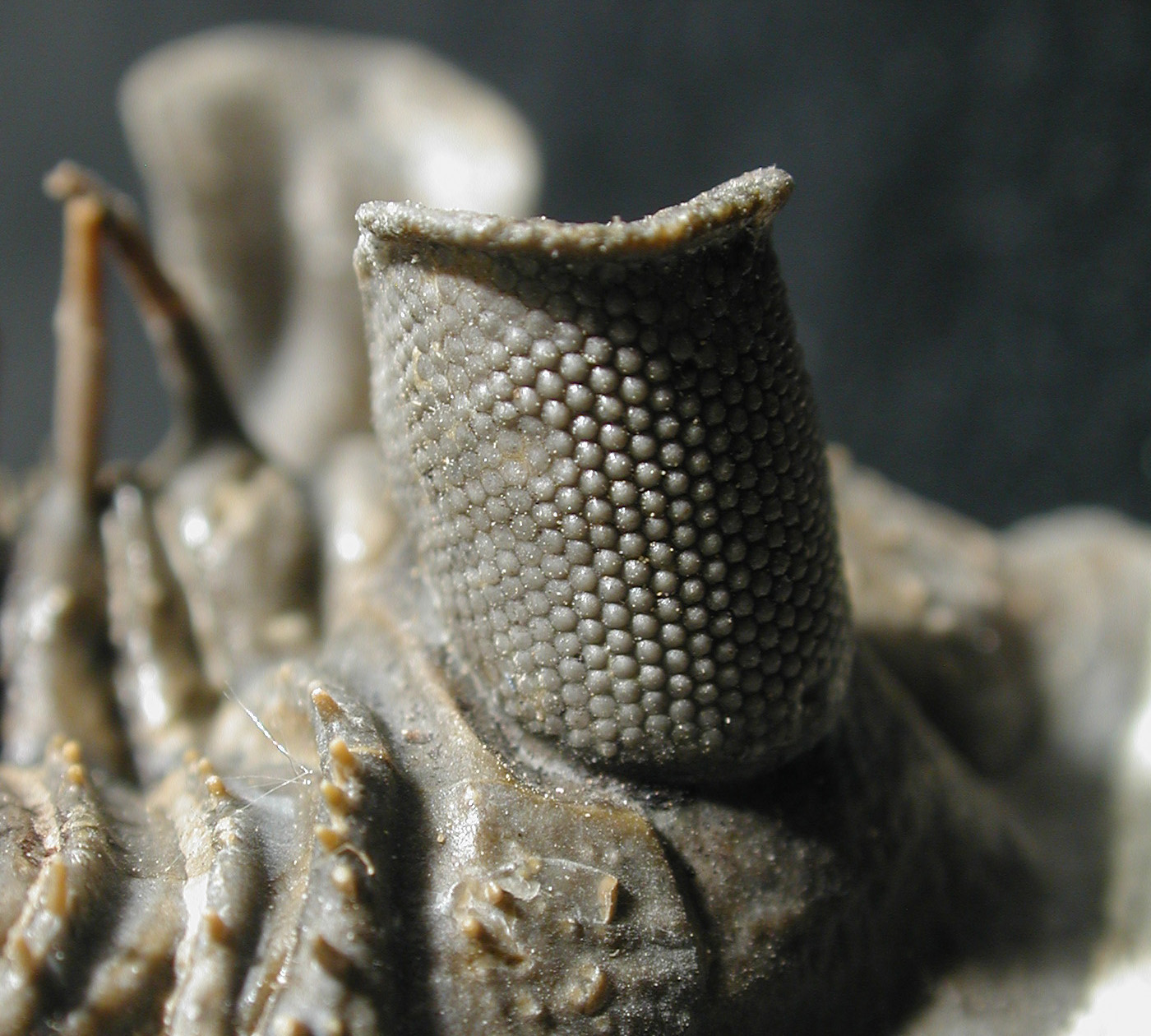
Erbenochile erbeni, eye, "sunshade" and spines

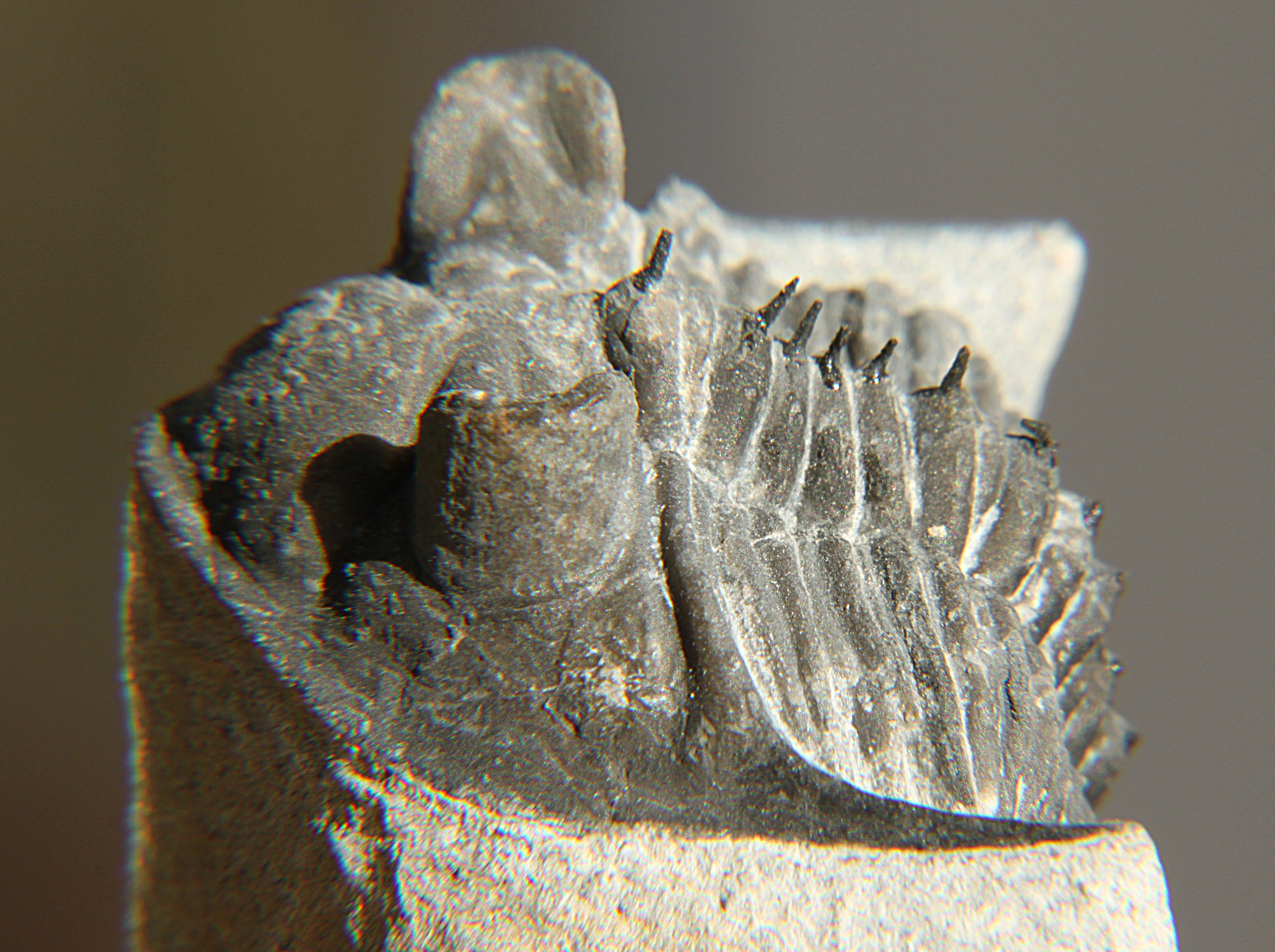
Erbenochile issoumourensis, lateral view of the head

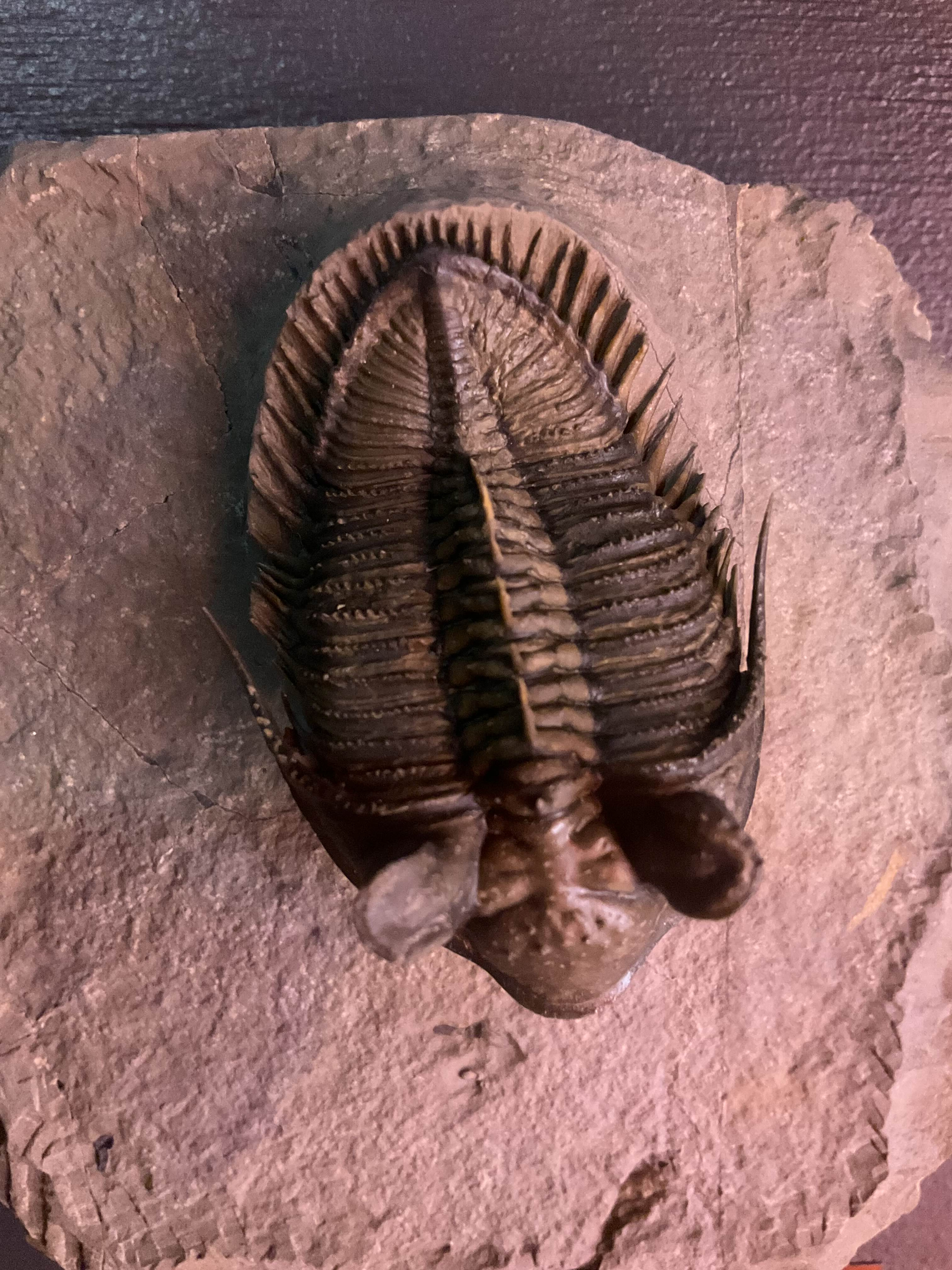
Erbenochile, dorsal view.

Erbenochile is a trilobite with very large eyes, with 33–36 vertical rows of 13–19 lenses each. The lower edge of eye slightly overhangs the adjacent part of the free cheek. The most backward part of the glabella (or occipital ring), the rings of the thorax, and rings on the pygidium each have a prominent median spine. The thorax consists of 11 segments. The frontal band of each of the lateral parts of the thorax segments (in the so-called pleural region) are not adorned. The posterior bands have a row of distinct small spines. The large tailshield (or pygidium) has 11 pairs of spines along the edge, and one in the middle, and 10–11 pairs of well-defined segments. The frontal pleural bands of each segment on the pygidium is lower compared to the posterior pleural band, and lacks the small spines of the posterior pleural band. The posterior border of pygidium is longer medially than laterally.

== Taxonomy ==
Erbenochile was originally designated as a subgenus to Odontochile, the type of the subfamily Odontochilinae, which was later synonymised with the subfamily Dalmanitinae. Morzadec promoted Erbenochile to full genus status and moved it to Asteropyginae, by virtue of having pygidial spines, a character unknown in Odontochilinae. Erbenochile also differs from all other Asteropyginid genera in a number of characters. The much larger number of segments of the pygidium, as expressed in the number of axial rings, pleural rib pairs and pygidial spines (23 versus 11, and in Gourdonia 13 spines) is most conspicuous. Also, the pygidial border has a smooth connection with the pygidial spines, while in the Asteropyginae the connection with the pygidial lappets have relief. Furthermore, in Erbenochile the split of the lateral glabellar furrow and the second and third transglabellar furrows (confusingly called S2 and S1) are very deep, comparable the situation in Dalmanitinae.

== Key to the species ==
1	The eyebrow-like palpebral lobe extends laterally over the visual surface of the eyes, "shading the eye against the sun". The visual surface is a vertical half-cylinder, with 18 or 19 lenses per vertical row. Front of the headshield (or cephalon) sticking out to the front (or short spatulate) and ornated with a row of upward and very short spines. Largest spines on the axis more than half as high as the eyes. Upper Emsian. Algeria and Morocco. → E. erbeni
-	The palpebral lobe does not extend laterally. The visual surface has an angle, with the diameter at the top of the eye smaller than at its base, with 13 or 14 lenses per vertical row. Front of the cephalon rounded triangular and without tubercles. Largest spines on the axis less than half as high as the eyes. Latest Emsian or early Eifelian. Morocco. → E. issoumourensis
