= Acastopyge =

Scientific classification
- Domain: Eukaryota
- Kingdom: Animalia
- Phylum: Arthropoda
- Class: †Trilobita
- Order: †Phacopida
- Family: †Acastidae
- Genus: †Acastopyge; Tomczykowa, 1974

Species
- A. shergoldi Tomczykowa, 1972 (type)

Extinct genus of trilobites

Acastopyge is a genus of trilobites in the order Phacopida, which existed in what is now Poland. It was named by E. Tomczykowa in 1974, and the type species is Acastopyge shergoldi.
