= Centauropyge =

Scientific classification
- Domain: Eukaryota
- Kingdom: Animalia
- Phylum: Arthropoda
- Class: †Trilobita
- Order: †Phacopida
- Family: †Acastidae
- Genus: †Centauropyge; Haas, 1968

Centauropyge is a trilobite in the order Phacopida that existed during the lower Devonian in what is now Turkey. It was described by Haas in 1968, and the type species is Centauropyge pronomaea. It was described from the Gebze Formation.
