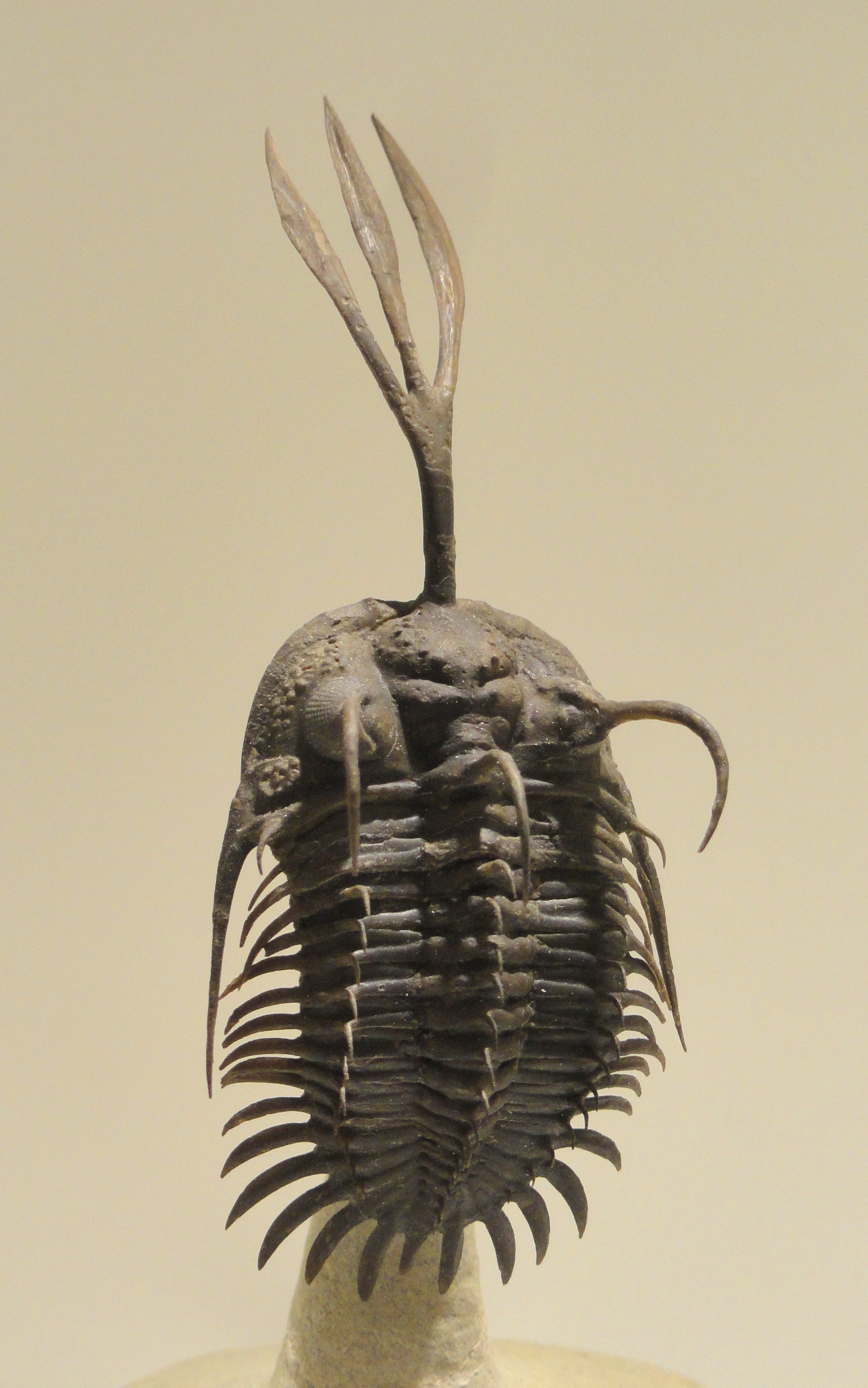
- Walliserops trifurcatus

Scientific classification
- Kingdom: Animalia
- Phylum: Arthropoda
- Clade: †Artiopoda
- Class: †Trilobita
- Order: †Phacopida
- Family: †Acastidae
- Genus: †Walliserops

Type species
- Walliserops trifurcatus Morzadec, 2001

Species
- W. trifurcatus Morzadec, 2001; W. hammii Chatterton et al., 2006; W. lindoei Chatterton & Gibb, 2010; W. tridens Chatterton et al., 2006

= Walliserops =

Walliserops Temporal range: Upper Emsian and Lower Eifelian

Genus of Devonian trilobites

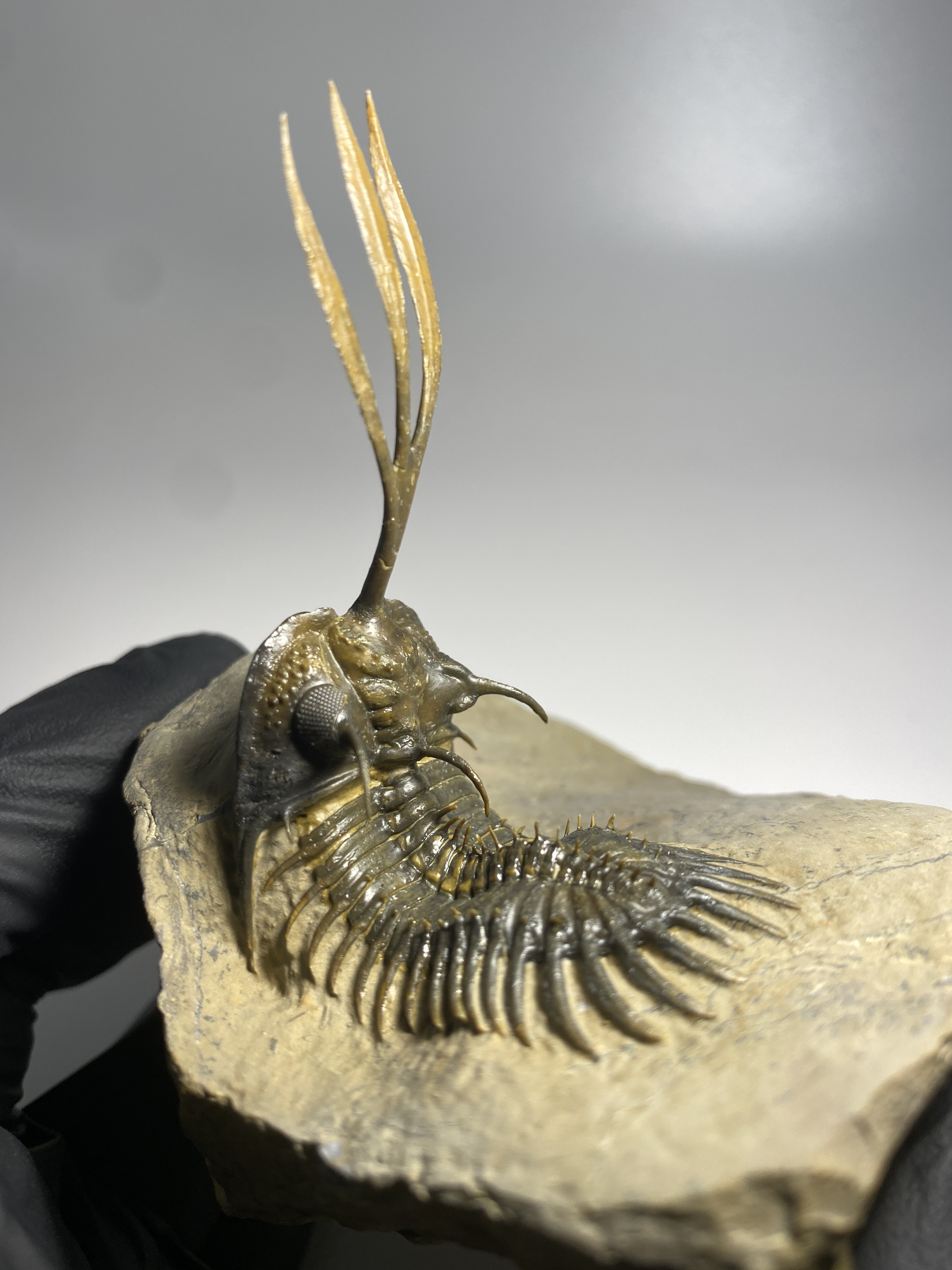
Walliserops trifurcatus

Walliserops (named after Prof. O. Walliser of the University of Göttingen) is a genus of spinose phacopid trilobite, of the family Acastidae, found in Lower to Middle Devonian age rocks from the Anti-Atlas Mountains of Morocco. All species of Walliserops possess a three-pronged "trident" that protrudes from the glabella. Walliserops is most closely related to the genus Comura.

== Taxonomy ==
Walliserops was originally erected for a single species, W. trifurcatus. Later, two other species were assigned: W. hammii and W. tridens. All three currently described species come from the same strata near Foum Zguid in southern Morocco. Three as yet undescribed species are recorded from other locations.

Early reports of "trident" trilobites and placement within the proposed new genus "Parabolops" ("parabola face")—long tridents being placed within "P. neptunis", short tridents placed within "P. hammi"—were pre-empted by the publication of the detailed analysis of Walliserops.

== Description ==
=== Asymmetry ===
Departures from bilateral symmetry are an unusual feature within Walliserops species, most clearly shown by the curved occipital spine of W. hammii taking a noticeable curl to one side. The regular development of these features in multiple specimens suggest a genetically controlled feature of the genus and not mutations or pathology. Most of the exceptions to bilateral symmetry noted (and also the absence of spines on the first two thoracic segments) can be explained by adaptations allowing the trident to be held off the sea floor while walking. Between the species there are variations in the extent of departure from bilateral symmetry: W. trifurcatus, with a long trident that is curved away from the seabed, has less obvious departures from bilateral symmetry than W. hammii, with a short trident close to the seabed.

=== Trident function ===
The function of the trident itself is poorly understood. With the amount of energy and nutrients expended in growing such a large adornment (probably multiple times as the trilobite shed its skin) its function was clearly important. Although a number of suggestions have been made (e.g. sensory apparatus, disguise or protection), the most satisfactory current explanation is that the trident served as "horns" similar to those of present-day beetles such as the rhinoceros beetles.

Sexual dimorphism was an intriguing prospect (longer trident forms as jousting males) when only two species (or possible dimorphs) were known. With the description of three species from the same location, polymorphism was another prospect but seemed unlikely. Although the presence of horns strongly suggests sexual dimorphism, lack of data on numerous fronts currently prevents firm conclusions from being drawn.

Sexual dimorphism in any trilobite exoskeleton has not yet been satisfactorily demonstrated and any decision to regard evidence as sexual dimorphism or as subspecific/specific difference(s) will be arbitrary.

— Whittington, 1997

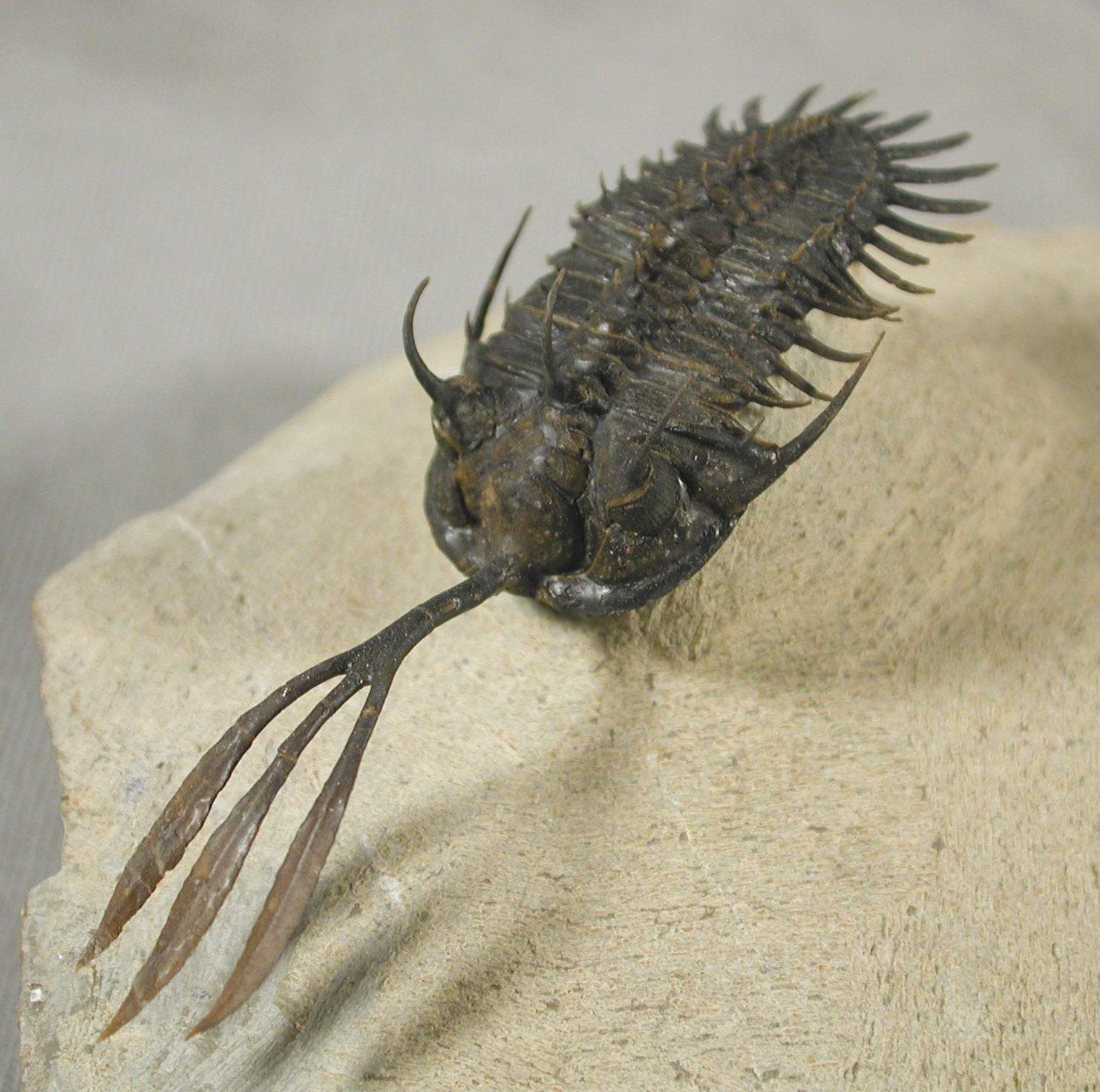
Walliserops trifurcatus

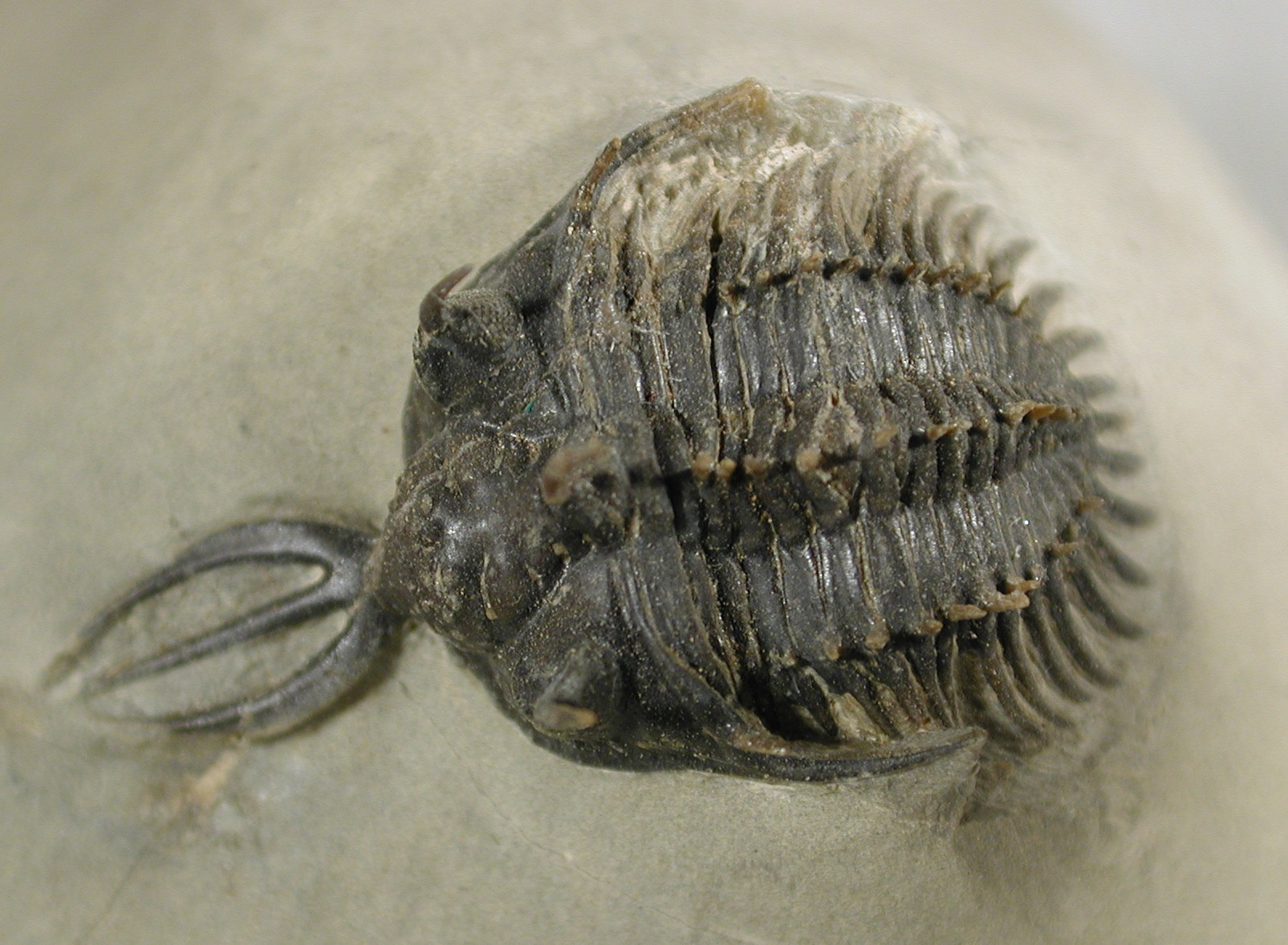
Walliserops tridens
