= Acastava =

Acastava Temporal range: Pragian to Emsian

Scientific classification
- Kingdom: Animalia
- Phylum: Arthropoda
- Clade: †Artiopoda
- Class: †Trilobita
- Order: †Phacopida
- Family: †Acastidae
- Genus: †Acastava; Richter & Richter, 1954

Species
- A. atavus (W.E. Schmidt, 1907) (type) synonym Cryphaeus atavus; A. schmidti Richter, 1909; A. lerougei Van Viersen, 2013

Extinct genus

Acastava is an extinct genus of trilobite in the order Phacopida, from the upper Pragian (A. atavus) to Emsian period (both other species listed) of the Devonian.
