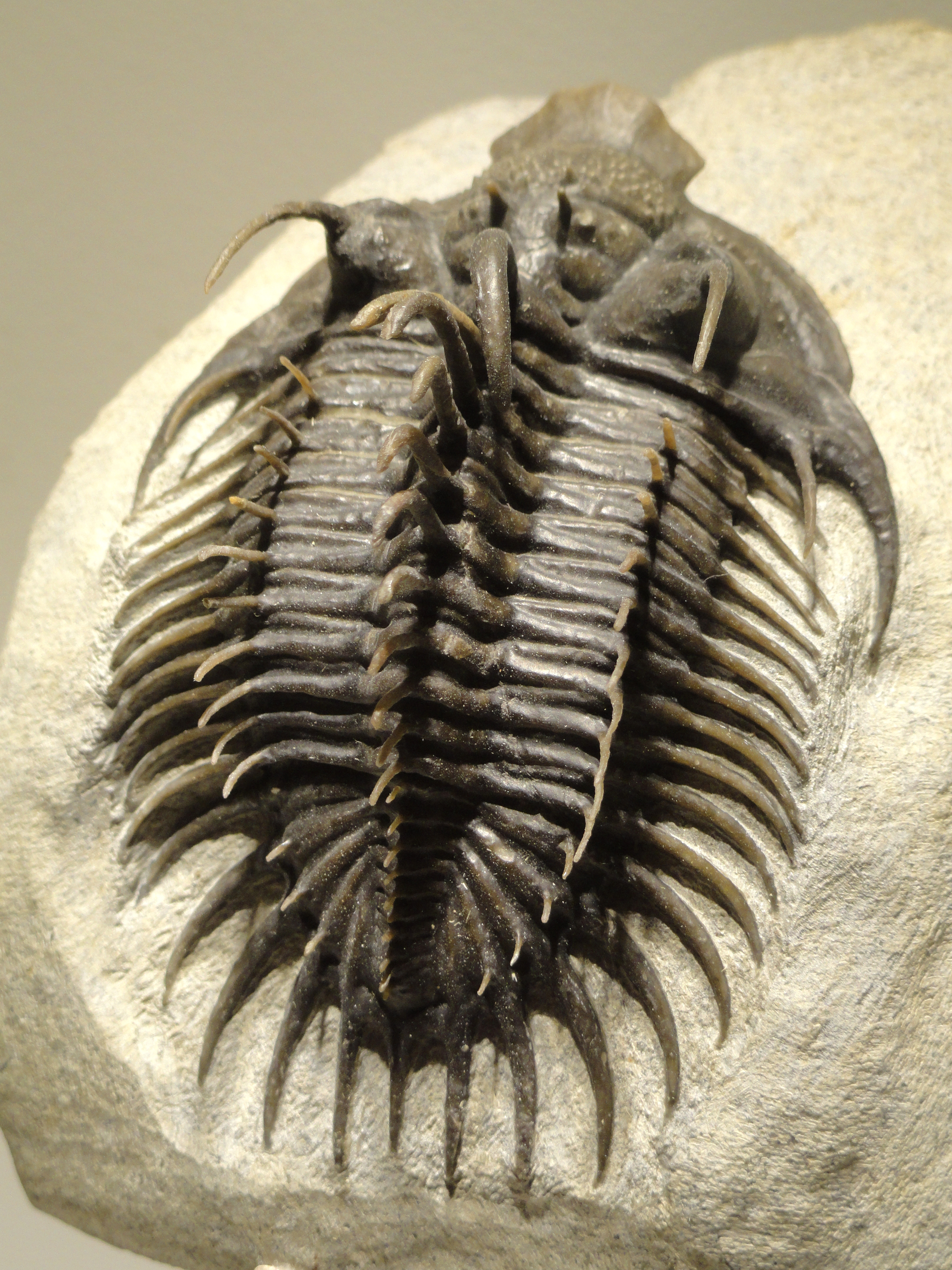
- Comura bultyncki

Scientific classification
- Domain: Eukaryota
- Kingdom: Animalia
- Phylum: Arthropoda
- Class: †Trilobita
- Order: †Phacopida
- Family: †Acastidae
- Genus: †Comura; Richter and Richter, 1926

= Comura =

Genus of trilobites

Comura is a trilobite in the order Phacopida that existed during the lower Devonian in what is now Eifel, Germany. It was described by Richter and Richter in 1926, and the type species is Comura cometa, originally under the genus Cryphaeus by Richter in 1909.
