= Acastella =

Acastella Temporal range: Upper Silurian to Lower Devonian

Scientific classification
- Missing taxonomy template (fix): Acastella

Species
- A. spinosa (Salter, 1864) (type) synonyms Phacops downingiae var. spinosa, Acaste downingiae spinosa, Acastava macrocentrus; A. granulosa Hollard, 1963; A. heberti (Gossellet, 1888); A. jacquemonti Hollard, 1963; A. patula Hollard, 1963; A. prima Tomczykowa, 1962; A. roualti (De Tromelin & Lebescomte, 1875); A. tanzidensis Hollard, 1963; A. tiro (R. & E. Richter, 1954)

Extinct genus of trilobite

Acastella is an extinct genus of trilobite. The genus contains six species being A. herberti, A. jacquemonti, A. prima, A. roualti, A. tanzidensis and A. tiro.
