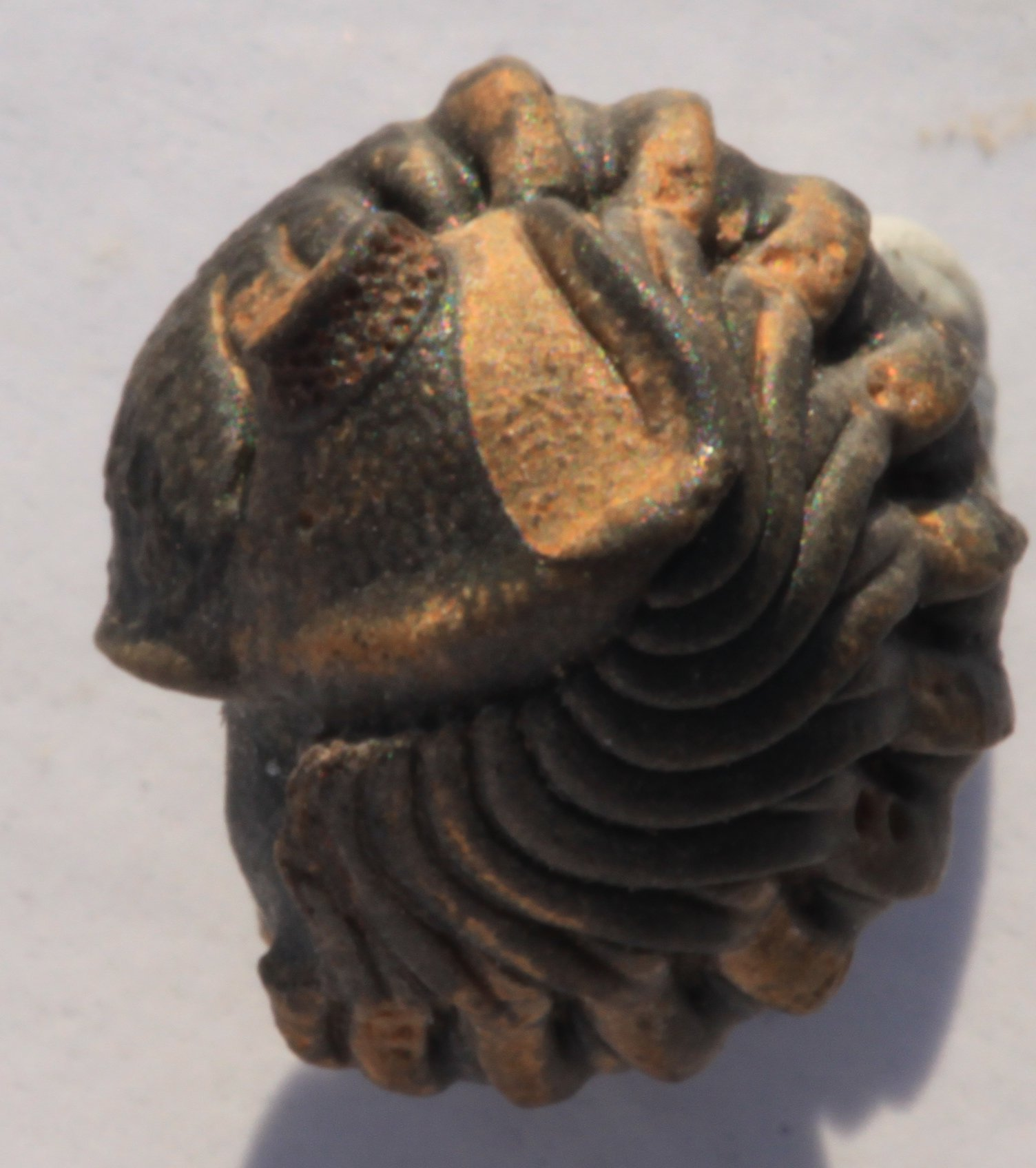
- Acastoides zguilmensis, Devonian, Morocco

Scientific classification
- Domain: Eukaryota
- Kingdom: Animalia
- Phylum: Arthropoda
- Class: †Trilobita
- Order: †Phacopida
- Family: †Acastidae
- Genus: †Acastoides; Delo, 1935

Species
- A. henni (R. Richter, 1916) (type) = Acaste henni; A. constricta (Salter, 1864) synonyms Phacops (Acaste) downingiae constrictus, P. constrictus, Acaste (Acastoides) constrictus; A. acutilobata (Knod, 1908); A. gamonedensis; A. haddadi Chatterton, Fortey, Brett, Gibb & McKellar, 2006; A. insolitus Wolfart, 1968; A. maura Alberti, 1969; A. paeckelmanni R. Richter & E. Richter, 1939; A. poschmanni Basse & Müller, 2016; A. zguilmensis Chatterton, Fortey, Brett, Gibb & McKellar, 2006

= Acastoides =

Acastoides Temporal range: 428–392 Ma Middle Silurian (Wenlock) to Devonian (?Eifelian)

Genus of trilobites (fossil)

Acastoides is an extinct genus of trilobite that lived during the Silurian and Devonian. It has been found in Bolivia, France, Morocco, Poland, Turkey and the United Kingdom.

== Distribution ==
- A. constricta is found in the Silurian of the United Kingdom (Wenlock, Woolhope Shale, Worcestershire, Malvern).

== Taxonomy ==
=== Species previously assigned to Acastoides ===
- A. verneuili = Calmonia terrarocenai
