= Talacasto Formation =

Geologic formation in Argentina

- Stratigraphic range: Devonian
- Type: Geological formation
- Unit of: Gualilán Group
- Thickness: 300–1,000 m (980–3,280 ft)

Location
- Region: San Juan Province; La Rioja Province
- Country: Argentina
- Extent: Precordillera Basin

Type section
- Named by: Padula et al
- Year defined: 1967

The Talacasto Formation is a geological formation in Argentina, exposed primarily across San Juan Province, with an additional outcrop in La Rioja Province. It preserves fossils dating back to the Devonian period.

== Description ==
The Talacasto Formation is exposed in the Precordillera Basin of Argentina, with outcrops most widespread in San Juan Province, though an isolated exposure also exists at Sierra de las Minitas in La Rioja Province. Along with the Punta Negra Formation, it makes up the Gualilán Group, which represent Devonian-aged deposits in the Argentine Precordillera. The thickness of the Talacasto Formation varies across its extent; at the type locality of Quebrada de Talacasto in the south it is 300 m (980 ft) thick, while at the Loma de los Piojos section near the Jáchal River in the north it exceeds 1,000 m (3,300 ft) in thickness.

== Fossil content ==
Color key: Taxon / Reclassified taxon / Taxon falsely reported as present / Dubious taxon or junior synonym / Ichnotaxon / Ootaxon / Morphotaxon

Notes
Uncertain or tentative taxa are in small text
~~crossed out~~ taxa are discredited.

=== Bivalves ===
Bivalves reported from the Talacasto Formation
Genus	Species	Presence	Material	Notes	Images
Actinopteria	A. eschwegei	Loma de los Piojos	About 20 specimens	A pterineid	
Actinopteria	A. modesta	Loma de los Piojos	Several specimens	A pterineid	
Anthracoleda	A. (Pseudoleda) minuta	Cerro del Fuerte; Loma de los Piojos	Several specimens	A nuculanid	
Deceptrix	D. (Devonodeceptrix) jachalensis	Loma de los Piojos	Several specimens	A cardiolariid	
Glossites	G. cf. G. depressus	Loma de los Piojos	2 specimens	A modiomorphid	
Grammysioidea	G. capricornus	Loma de los Piojos	5 specimens	A grammysiid	
Nuculites	N. argentinum	Cerro del Fuerte; Loma de los Piojos	Numerous specimens	A cucullellid	
Nuculoidea	N.? sp.	Cerro del Fuerte	4 specimens	A nuculid	
Palaeoneilo	P. cf. P. forbesi	Loma de los Piojos	5 internal moulds	A malletiid	
Pholadella	P. radiata	Loma de los Piojos	7 specimens	A sanguinolitid	

=== Brachiopods ===
Brachiopods reported from the Talacasto Formation
Genus	Species	Presence	Material	Notes	Images
Anoplia	A. azucenae	Portezuelo del Tambolar	Over 70 specimens	An anopliid	
Anoplia	A. sp. A	Río Talacasto	6 specimens	An anopliid	
Anoplia	A. sp.	Los Algarrobos section		An anopliid	
Athyris	A. sp.	Los Algarrobos section		An athyridid	
Australostrophia	A. penoensis	Loma de los Piojos; Cerro del Fuerte; Agua del Peñón	Numerous specimens	A strophochonetid	
Boucotia	B. argentina	Loma de los Piojos; Portezuelo del Tambolar	3 isolated valves	A notanopliid	
Chonostrophia	C. elenae	Loma de los Piojos	Several specimens	A chonostrophiid	
Chonostrophia	C. reversa var. andina	Quebrada de Talacasto	Several specimens	Tentatively reclassified as a species of Sanjuanetes	
Eoschucertella	E. delicata	Quebrada Zerina	Numerous specimens	An areostrophiid	
Iridistrophia	I. aliciae	Cerro del Fuerte	Numerous specimens	A chilidiopsid	
Iridistrophia	I. dominans	Loma de los Piojos	Numerous specimens	A chilidiopsid	
Iridistrophia	I. magna	Cordón de Agua de Peñón	Numerous specimens	A chilidiopsid	
Iridistrophia	I. prima	Quebrada La Cortadera	Numerous specimens	A chilidiopsid	
Kentronetes	K. giolittii	Quebrada Las Loras	6 valves	A strophochonetid	
Kentronetes	K. ortegae	Loma de los Piojos	Numerous specimens	A strophochonetid	
Kentronetes	K. vallensis	Loma de los Piojos	31 specimens	A strophochonetid	
Kentronetes	K. variabilis	Portezuelo del Tambolar; Poblete Sur; Quebrada del río Talacasto; Quebrada del Chañar (Cerro La Chilca); Loma de los Piojos	32 valves	A strophochonetid	
Lingula	L. sp.	Los Algarrobos section		A lingulid	
Lomaella	L. primoris	Loma de los Piojos	9 specimens	An eodevonariid	
Lomaella	L. sanjuanina	Loma de los Piojos	Several specimens	An eodevonariid	
Meristella	M. sp.	Los Algarrobos section		A meristellid	
Metaplasia	M. baldisi	Los Algarrobos section		An ambocoeliid	
Pleurochonetes	?P. sp.	Loma de los Piojos	32 specimens	A chonetid	
Plicanoplia	P. sp.	Loma de los Piojos	5 specimens	An anopliid	
Sanjuanetes	?S. andina	Quebrada de Talacasto; Los Algarrobos section	Several specimens	A strophochonetid, originally reported as Chonostrophia reversa var. andina	

=== Cephalopods ===
Cephalopods reported from the Talacasto Formation
Genus	Species	Presence	Material	Notes	Images
Bactrites	B. gracilis	Quebrada de Talacasto; Below Keidel's Bed	18 specimens	A bactritid	
Bactrites	B. sp.	Quebrada de Talacasto; Sierra de las Minitas	5 specimens	A bactritid	
Devonobactrites	D.? sp.	Loma de los Piojos section	2 specimens	A bactritid	

=== Corals ===
Corals reported from the Talacasto Formation
Genus	Species	Presence	Material	Notes	Images
Enterolasma	E. sp.	Cerro del Fuerte section	Fragments & complete specimens	A horn coral	
Favosites	F.? sp.	Cerro del Fuerte section	1 colony	A tabulate coral	
Parastriatopora	P. cf. gigantea	Tambolar section	6 small branch fragments	A tabulate coral	
Parastriatopora	P. sanjuanina	Los Algarrobos section		A tabulate coral	
Parastriatopora	P. sp.	Los Algarrobos section		A tabulate coral	

=== Echinoderms ===
Echinoderms reported from the Talacasto Formation
Genus	Species	Presence	Material	Notes	Images
Argentinaster	A. bodenbenderi	Jachal	Several specimens	An ophiurinid brittle star	
Crinoidea indet.	Indeterminate	Los Algarrobos section		A crinoid	
Furcaster	F. separatus	Jachal	Multiple specimens	A protasterid brittle star	
Marginix	M. yachalensis	Jachal	Several specimens	An encrinasterid brittle star	
Promopalaeaster	P.? quadriserialis	Jachal	Several specimens	A valvatid starfish	

=== Hyoliths ===
Hyoliths reported from the Talacasto Formation
Genus	Species	Presence	Material	Notes	Images
Hyolithida indet.	Indeterminate	Los Algarrobos section		A hyolithid	

=== Ostracods ===
Ostracods reported from the Talacasto Formation
Genus	Species	Presence	Material	Notes	Images
Aechmina	A. sp.	Talacasto Creek	6 specimens	A member of Podocopa	
Amphizona	A.? argentinensis	Portezuelo del Tambolar; Talacasto Creek; Poblete Sur; Las Tunas	23 specimens	A member of Podocopa	
Bollia	B. talacastensis	Talacasto Creek; Poblete Sur	20 specimens	A member of Podocopa	
Keslingiella	K. teresae	Los Algarrobos; Talacasto Creek; Poblete Sur; La Chilcas; Las Tunas	Several specimens	A member of Podocopida	
Lapazites	L. aff. L. trinodis	Portezuelo del Tambolar; La Cortadera; Poblete Sur; La Chilca	12 specimens	A member of Podocopa	
Petrisigmoopsis	P.? rotundum	Talacasto Creek; La Chilca	Several specimens	A member of Podocopa	
Pircawayra	P. antiqua	Portezuelo del Tambolar; La Cortadera Creek; La Chilca; Las Aguaditas Creek	5 specimens	A member of Palaeocopida	
Pircawayra	P. peregrina	Loma de los Piojos	Several specimens	A member of Palaeocopida	
Suinella	S. huarpesi	Portezuelo del Tambolar; Talacasto Creek; Poblete Sur	Several specimens	A member of Podocopa	
Thlipsurella	T. aff. T. putea	Los Algarrobos; Talacasto Creek; Poblete Sur; Las Tunas	33 specimens	A member of Podocopida	
Ulrichia	U. sp.	Talacasto Creek; Poblete Sur; La Chilca	7 specimens	A member of Podocopa	

=== Sponges ===
Sponges reported from the Talacasto Formation
Genus	Species	Presence	Material	Notes	Images
Talacastospongia	T. minima	Talacasto section; Los Algarrobos; Las Aguaditas	13 specimens	A glass sponge	

=== Trilobites ===
Trilobites reported from the Talacasto Formation
Genus	Species	Presence	Material	Notes	Images
Aguaditaspis	A. mediaspina	Quebrada de las Aguaditas; Sierra de las Minitas	Several specimens	A dalmanitid	
Bainella	B. cooperi	Cerro La Chilca	6 specimens	A calmoniid	
Bainella	B. sanjuanina	Cerro La Chilca	8 specimens	A calmoniid	
Calmonia	C. nov. sp. A	Loma de los Piojos	An internal mould (CORD PZ 8613)	A calmoniid	
Dalmanitoides	D. boehmi	Loma de los Piojos	Several specimens	A dalmanitid	
Dalmanitoides	D. drevermanni	Loma de los Piojos; Cerro La Chilca	Several specimens	A dalmanitid	
Dalmanitidae indet.	Gen. et. sp. nov.	Quebrada de las Aguaditas	One specimen (CEGH-UNC 27422)	An unnamed dalmanitid	
Dalmanitidae indet.	Indeterminate	Los Algarrobos section		A dalmanitid	
Dalmanitinae gen. et. sp. indet.	Indeterminate	Sierra de las Minitas	Fragmentary pygidium (PULR-132 A-B)	A dalmanitid	
Deltacephalaspis	D. sp.	Cerro La Chilca	2 specimens	A calmoniid	
Echidnops	E. taphomimus	Quebrada de Las Aguaditas; Sierra de Los Blaquitos; Sierra de las Minitas	12 specimens	A phacopid, originally reported as an unnamed species of Paciphacops	
Ivanites	I. leonorae	Quebrada de Las Aguaditas; Quebrada de Talacasto; Loma de los Piojos	Several specimens	A dalmanitid	
Maurotarion	M. (Malvinotarion) gaucho	Loma de los Piojos	10 specimens	An aulacopleurid	
Maurotarion	M. (Malvinotarion) haudei	Loma de los Piojos	2 specimens	An aulacopleurid	
Maurotarion	M. (Malvinotarion) talacastoense	La Cantera point	5 specimens	An aulacopleurid	
Maurotarion	M. (Malvinotarion) sp.	Portezuelo del Tambolar	One specimen (CEGH-UNC 7.086)	An aulacopleurid	
Maurotarion	M. (Malvinotarion) sp. B	Cerro La Chilca	One specimen	An aulacopleurid	
Maurotarion	M. megacephalum	Loma de los Piojos	23 specimens	An aulacopleurid	
Maurotarion	M. sp.	Los Algarrobos section		An aulacopleurid	
Paciphacops	P. (Paciphacops) sp.	Sierra de las Minitas	Several specimens	Now known as Echidnops taphomimus	
Paciphacops	P. sp.	Los Algarrobos section		A phacopid	
Paciphacops	P.? sp.	Sierra de las Minitas	One specimen (PULR-127 A-B)	A phacopid	
Parabouleia	P. eldredgei	Quebrada de Talacasto	9 specimens	A calmoniid	
Parabouleia	P. sp.	Los Algarrobos section		A calmoniid	
Talacastops	T. zarelae	Quebrada de Las Aguaditas; Sierra de las Minitas	Multiple specimens	A calmoniid	
Tarijactinoides	T. jarcasensis	Cerro La Chilca; Loma de los Piojos	13 specimens	A calmoniid	
Tormesiscus	T. cf. hildae	Sierra de las Minitas	Partial specimen (PULR-130)	A calmoniid	
Unguliproetus	U.? sp.	Sierra de las Minitas	Two associated fragments	A proetid	
