= Gamoneda Formation =

Geologic formation in Bolivia

- Stratigraphic range: Emsian; ~409–392 Ma
- Type: Geological formation
- Thickness: ~340 m (1,120 ft)

Lithology
- Primary: Sandstone, siltstone
- Other: Shale

Location
- Coordinates: 21.5°S 64.8°W
- Approximate paleocoordinates: 66.5°S 98.4°W
- Region: Tarija Department
- Country: Bolivia
- Extent: Cordillera Oriental

Type section
- Named for: La Gamoneda
- Gamoneda Formation (Bolivia)

The Gamoneda Formation is an Emsian geologic formation of southern Bolivia. The approximately 340 metres (1,120 ft) thick formation comprises marine micaceous grey siltstones and burrowed grey sandstones and shales.

== Fossil content ==
The formation has provided the following fossils:

- Acastoides gamonedensis
- Australocoelia palmata
- Australospirifer hawkinsi
- Australostrophia mesembria
- Bainella (Belenops) insolita
- Cryptonella baini
- Deltacephalaspis (Deltacephalaspis) comis
- Deltacephalaspis (Deltacephalaspis) retrospina
- Deltacephalaspis (Prestalia) tumida
- Derbyina jamesiana
- Gamonedaspis scutata
- Kozlowskiaspis (Romanops) australis
- Notiochonetes falklandica
- Phacopina convexa
- Plicoplasia planoconvexa
- Protoleptostrophia concinna
- Pustulatia curupira
- Schizostylus (Curuyella) granulata
- Tarijactinoides jarcasensis
- Burmeisteria sp.
- cf. Francovichia sp.
- Calmoniidae indet.
- Eurypterida indet.

== See also ==
- List of fossiliferous stratigraphic units in Bolivia
