= Catavi Formation =

Geological formation in Bolivia

- Stratigraphic range: Pridoli-Emsian; ~418–392 Ma
- Type: Geological formation
- Overlies: Kirusillas Formation
- Thickness: Up to 456 m (1,496 ft)

Lithology
- Primary: Sandstone, siltstone
- Other: Shale, limestone

Location
- Coordinates: 17.4°S 66.2°W
- Approximate paleocoordinates: 56.8°S 112.7°W
- Region: Cochabamba & La Paz Departments
- Country: Bolivia
- Extent: Cordillera Oriental

Type section
- Named for: Catavi
- Catavi Formation (Bolivia)

The Catavi Formation is a Pridoli to Emsian geologic formation of northern and central Bolivia. The formation comprises a 456 m (1,496 ft) thick succession of fine-grained, olive to brown sandstones and siltstones, shales and black limestones deposited in a shallow to deep marine environment.

== Fossil content ==
The formation has provided the following fossils:

- Andinodesma radicostata
- Antarctilamna seriponensis
- Australocoelia tourteloti
- Bolivacanthus sagitalis
- Burmeisteria herscheli
- Cingulochitina ceneratiensis, C. ervensis
- Clarkeia antisiensis
- Climatius enodiscosta
- Gomphonchus pluriformis
- Gyracanthus seriponensis
- Kazachstania gerardoi
- Leonaspis (Leonaspis) aracana
- Leonaspis (Leonaspis) berryi
- Leonaspis (? Leonaspis) chacaltayana
- Nodonchus rectus
- Odontochile andii
- Onchus punctuatus, O. sicaeformis
- Paciphacops waisfeldae
- Palaeoneilo unionoides
- Phacopina (Phacopina) chojnacotensis
- Sinacanthus boliviensis
- Turinia gondwana
- Andinacaste cf. legrandi
- Burmeisteria (Digonus) cf. noticus
- Calymene sp.
- Pleurodictyum sp.
- Trimerus sp.
- Acanthodii indet.
- Brachiopoda indet.
- Bryozoa indet.
- Cephalopoda indet.
- Gastropoda indet.
- Ischnacanthida indet.
- Ophiuroidea indet.
- Palaeotaxodonta indet.
- Tentaculitida indet.
- Trilobita indet.

== See also ==
- List of fossiliferous stratigraphic units in Bolivia
