= Francovich =

Francovich may refer to:

== People ==
- Albert A. Francovich (1920-1942), a United States Navy sailor and Navy Cross recipient
- Allan Francovich (1941-1997), an American film producer and director
- Riccardo Francovich (1946-2007), an Italian archaeologist

== Law ==
- The Francovich principle, a principle of European Union law

== Ships ==
- USS Francovich, the name of more than one United States Navy ship

== See also ==
- Francovichia
