= Belén Formation =

Geologic formation in Bolivia

Belèn Formation
- Stratigraphic range: Pragian - Emsian
- Type: Geological formation
- Underlies: Sicasica Formation
- Overlies: Vila Vila Formation

Location
- Region: Altiplano
- Country: Bolivia

The Belèn Formation is an early Devonian formation from Bolivia. It preserves a moderately diverse fauna of trilobites, crinoids and a few species of jawed fish, and is equivalent to the Icla Formation further east.

== Paleobiota ==
Color key: Taxon / Reclassified taxon / Taxon falsely reported as present / Dubious taxon or junior synonym / Ichnotaxon / Ootaxon / Morphotaxon	Notes; Uncertain or tentative taxa are in small text; ~~crossed out~~ taxa are discredited.

Paleobiota
Genus	Species	Higher taxon	Notes	Images
Bolivosteus	B. chacomensis	Asterosteidae	Only known placoderm from the Malvinokaffric realm	Reconstruction of Bolivosteus
Pucapampella	P. rodrigae	Stem-Chondrichthyes	Also known from the Icla Formation, one of the most basal known cartilaginous fish	Fossilized jaws and teeth of P. rodrigae (A-C, G-H) and cartilage elements of Zamponiopteron (D-F), which may belong to the same animal, from the Department of Puno, Peru. Scale bar = 0.5 cm
Tuberocrinus	T. lapazensis	Tuberocrinidae (Camerata)	Placed in a monotypic family	
Aenigmaticumcrinus	A. rochacamposi	Aenigmaticumcrinidae (Camerata)	Named due to its unusual morphology in relation to other related crinoids	
Ctenocrinus	C. branisai	Melocrinitidae (Monobathrida)		
Boliviacrinus	B. isaacsoni	Patelliocrinidae (Monobathrida)		
Pachyblastus	P. dicki	Nymphaeoblastidae (Blastoidea)		
Fenestraspis	F. amauta	Dalmanitidae	Has large fenestrae (holes) on its pleural regions (sides of the body)	
Chacomurus	C. confragosus	Dalmanitidae		
Maurotarion	M. legrandi	Aulacopleuridae (Proetida)		
Bainella	B. (Belenops) insolita	Calmoniidae		
Deltacephalaspis	D. (Deltacephalaspis) magister, D. (Prestalia) sp.	Calmoniidae		
Acastoides?	?A. verneuili	Acastidae		
Tarijactinoides	T. tikanensis	Calmoniidae		
Parabouleia	P. calmonensis	Calmoniidae		
Kozlowskiaspis	K. (Romanops) borealis	Calmoniidae		
Phacopina	P. cf. convexa	Calmoniidae		
Plesiomalvinella	P. pujravii, P. boulei	Calmoniidae		
Malvinella	M. buddae	Calmoniidae		
Palpebrops	P. donegalensis	Calmoniidae		
Vogesina	V. aspera, V. lacunafera	Calmoniidae	Formerly classed within the genus Phacopina	
Neobactrotheca	N. pharetra	Orthothecida		
Bolitheca	B. steinmanni	Orthothecida		
”Hyolithes”	”H”. dorbignyi	Hyolithida		
Chonostrophia	C. truyolsae	Chonostrophiidae (Chonetidina)		
Aseptonetes	A. isaacsoni	Chonetidae (Chonetidina)		
Tropidoleptus	T. carinatus	Tropidoleptidae (Terebratulida)		
Schuchertella	S. sp?	Schuchertellidae (Orthotetida)		
Notiochonetes	N. falklandica	Chonetidae (Chonetidina)		
Austronoplia	A. stuebeli	Anopliidae (Chonetidina)		
Antelocoelia	A. johnsoni	Leptocoeliidae (Atrypoidea)		
Australocoelia	A. palmata	Leptocoeliidae (Rhynchonellida)		
Meristelloides	M. rikowskii	Meristellidae (Athyridida)		
Austrlospirifer	A. hawkinsi	Delthyrididae (Spiriferida)		
Metaplasia	M. pseudoumbonata	Ambocoeliidae (Spiriferida)		
Scaphiocoelia	S. boliviensis	Mutationellidae (Terebratulida)		
Cryptonella	C. baini	Cryptonellidae (Terebratulida)		
