= Bouleia =

Bouleia Temporal range: Lower Devonian

Scientific classification
- Domain: Eukaryota
- Kingdom: Animalia
- Phylum: Arthropoda
- Class: †Trilobita
- Order: †Phacopida
- Family: †Calmoniidae
- Genus: †Bouleia; Kozlowski, 1923

Species
- B. dagincourti (Ulrich, 1892) (type) synonym Phacops dagincourti; B. sphaericeps (Kozlowski, 1923) synonym Dereimsia sphaericeps

Genus of trilobites

Bouleia is a genus of trilobites in the order Phacopida (family Calmoniidae) which existed during the lower Devonian in what is now Bolivia. It was described by Kozlowski in 1923, and the type species is B. dagincourti, which was originally described under the genus Phacops by Ulrich in 1892. It also contains the species B. sphaericeps, originally described by Kozlowski, also in 1923, as Dereimsia sphaericeps. The type locality was the Icla Formation in Padilla.

== Taxonomy ==
Bouleia belongs to a group of primarily South-American species that developed from the genus Metacryphaeus. It is most related to Parabouleia, and these two genera together are the sistergroup of a clade containing Vogesina, Palpebrops and Malvinella.
