= Guichenia =

Scientific classification
- Kingdom: Animalia
- Phylum: Arthropoda
- Clade: †Artiopoda
- Class: †Trilobita
- Order: †Phacopida
- Family: †Dalmanitidae
- Genus: †Guichenia; Henry, 1968

Genus of trilobites

Guichenia is a trilobite in the order Phacopida (family Dalmanitidae), that existed during the middle Ordovician in what is now France. It was described by Henry in 1968, and the type species is Guichenia dufouri, which was originally described under the genus Dalmanites by Tromelin and Lebesconte in 1876. The type locality was the Calymènes Shale, in Loire-Atlantique.
