= Cordobés Formation =

Geologic formation in Uruguay

- Stratigraphic range: Pragian-Emsian; ~409–392 Ma
- Type: Geological formation
- Unit of: Durazno Group
- Underlies: La Paloma Formation
- Overlies: Cerrezuelo Formation
- Thickness: 92 m (302 ft)

Lithology
- Primary: Shale
- Other: Fine sandstone

Location
- Coordinates: 33.0°S 55.0°W
- Approximate paleocoordinates: 68.5°S 136.2°W
- Region: Durazno Department
- Country: Uruguay
- Extent: Norte Basin

Type section
- Named for: Arroyo Cordobés
- Named by: Bossi
- Year defined: 1966
- Cordobés Formation (Uruguay)

The Cordobés Formation is an Early Devonian (Pragian to Emsian) geologic formation of the Durazno Group in the Paraná Basin in the Durazno Department of central Uruguay. The shallow marine shales preserve trilobite, bivalve, gastropod and brachiopod fossils.

== Description ==
The Cordobés Formation is characterized by reddish fine shale deposited in a shallow marine environment.

== Fossil content ==
The following fossils have been reported from the formation:

- Trilobites
  - Acaste sp.
  - Burmeisteria sp.
  - Metacryphaeus sp.
  - ?Calmonia sp.
  - ?Paracalmonia sp.
  - ?Pennaia sp.
- Lophophorata
  - Tentaculites sp.
- Strophomenata
  - Australostrophia sp.
  - Notiochonetes sp.
  - Schuchertella sp.
- Rhynchonellata
  - Derbyina sp.
  - Australospirifer sp.
  - Australocoelia sp.
- Lingulata
  - Orbiculoidea sp.
  - Lingula sp.
  - Styliolina sp.
  - "Serpulites" sp.
- Bivalves
  - Modiolus sp.
  - Modiomorpha sp.
  - Goniophora sp.
  - Pleurodapis sp.
  - Nuculites sp.
  - "Nuculana" sp.
- Gastropods
  - Encrinaster sp.
  - Plectonotus sp.

== See also ==
- List of fossiliferous stratigraphic units in Uruguay
