= B. africana =

B. africana may refer to:

- Burkea africana, a tree species found in tropical Africa
- Bainella africana, an extinct trilobite species

== See also ==
- Africana (disambiguation)
