= Corycephalus =

Scientific classification
- Kingdom: Animalia
- Phylum: Arthropoda
- Clade: †Artiopoda
- Class: †Trilobita
- Order: †Phacopida
- Family: †Dalmanitidae
- Genus: †Corycephalus; Hall & Clarke, 1888

Genus of trilobites

Corycephalus is a genus of trilobites in the order Phacopida, that existed during the lower Devonian in what is now New York, U.S. It was described by Hall and Clarke in 1888, and the type species is Corycephalus regalis, originally described under the genus Dalmanites by Hall in 1876. The species was described from the Schoharie Formation.
