= Daytonia =

Scientific classification
- Domain: Eukaryota
- Kingdom: Animalia
- Phylum: Arthropoda
- Class: †Trilobita
- Order: †Phacopida
- Family: †Dalmanitidae
- Genus: †Daytonia; Holloway, 1981

Genus of trilobites

Daytonia is a trilobite in the order Phacopida, that existed during the lower Silurian in what is now the United States. It was described by D. J. Holloway in 1981, and the type species is Daytonia werthneri, which was originally described under the genus Dalmanites by August Foerste in 1885. It also contains the species, Daytonia mekon. The type locality for the genus was the Brassfield Formation, in Ohio.
