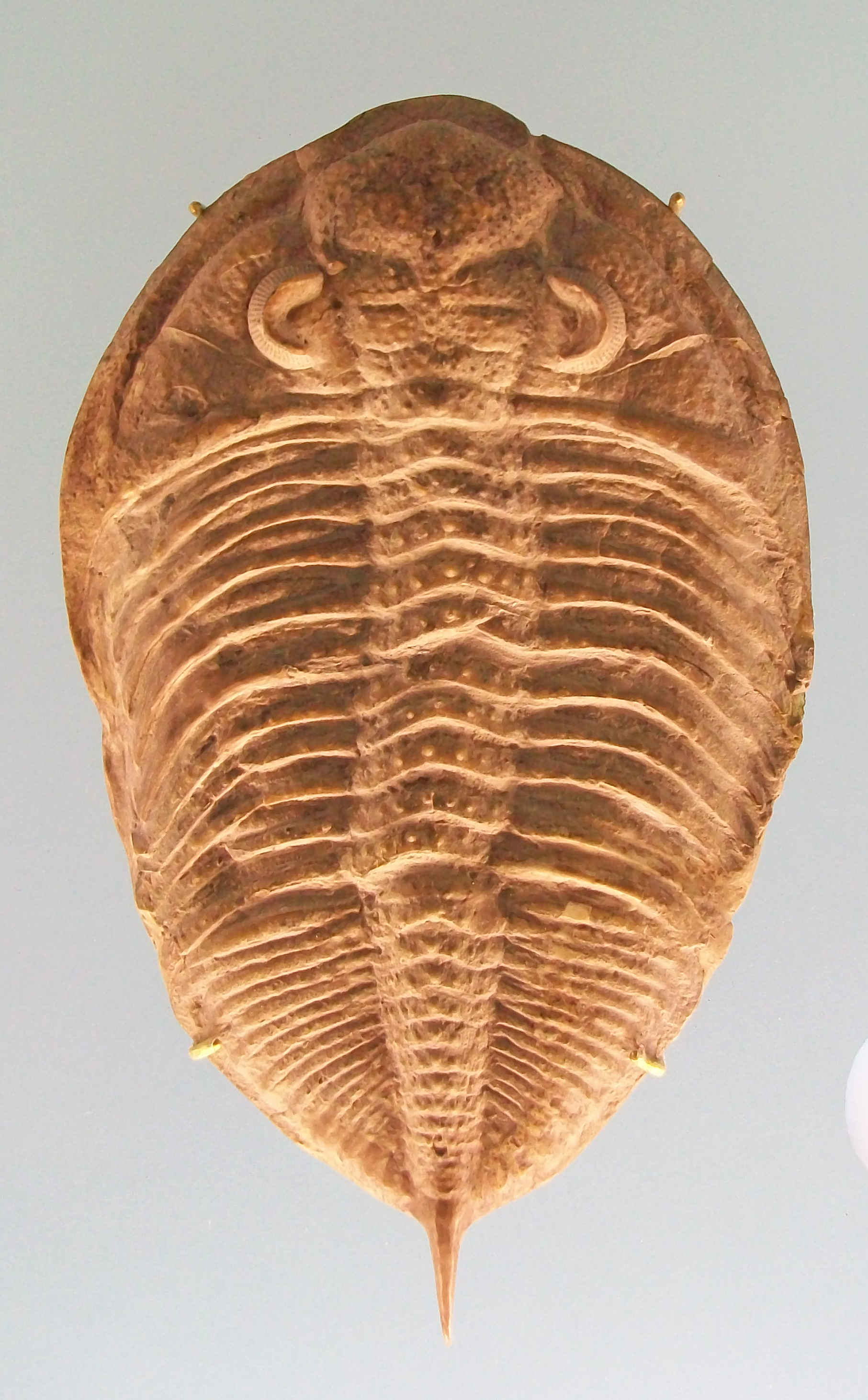
- Fossil of G. verrucosus in the Field Museum of Natural History.

Scientific classification
- Kingdom: Animalia
- Phylum: Arthropoda
- Clade: †Artiopoda
- Class: †Trilobita
- Order: †Phacopida
- Family: †Dalmanitidae
- Genus: †Glyptambon; Holloway, 1981

Species
- G. verrucosus Holloway, 1981 (type); G. amsdeni Edgecombe, 1991; G. gassi Edgecombe, 1991

= Glyptambon =

Glyptambon Temporal range: Silurian

Genus of trilobites

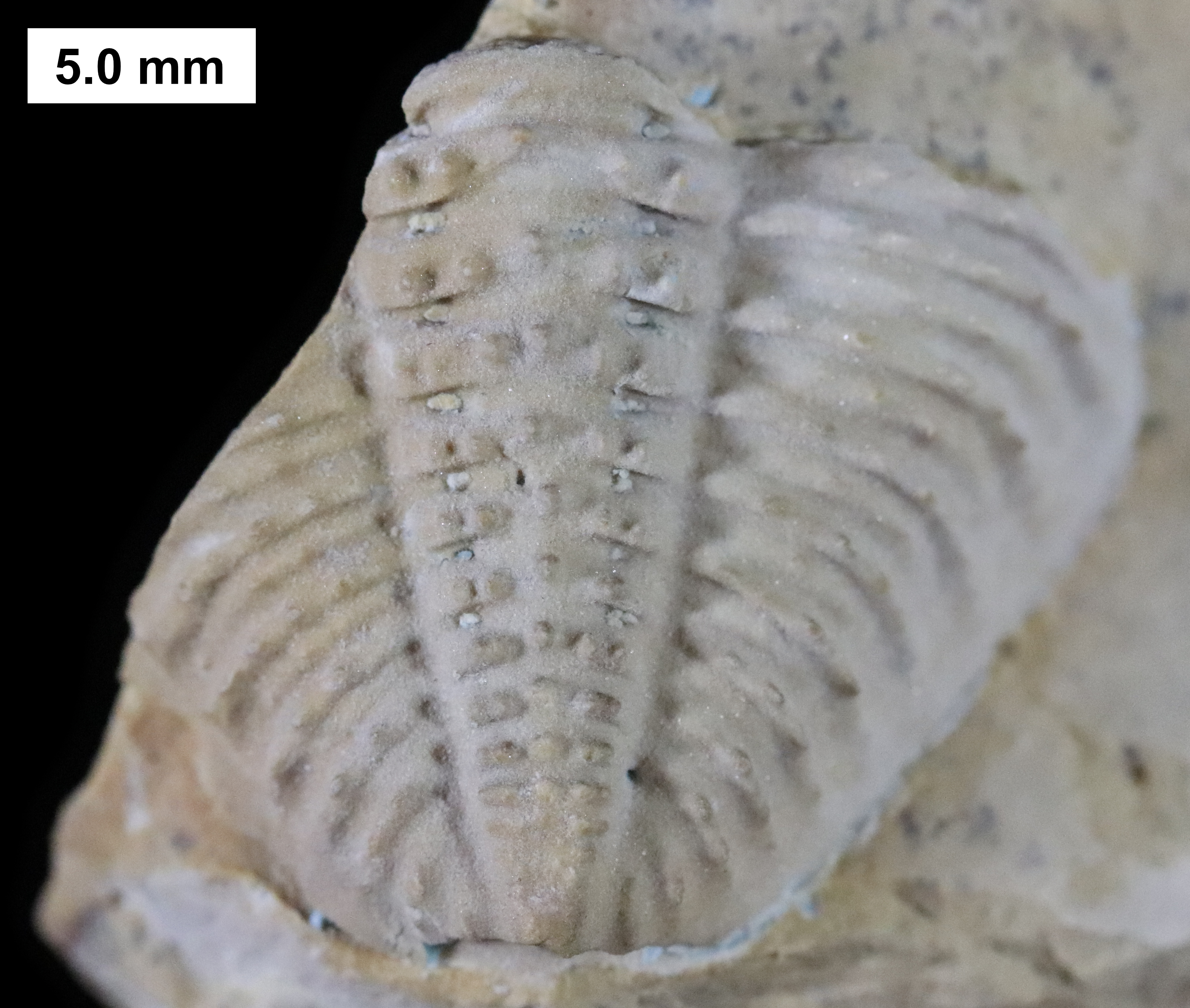
Internal mold of pygidium (missing terminal spine) of Glyptambon gassi from the inter-reef beds of the Racine Dolomite Formation, Illinois.

Glyptambon is an extinct genus of Silurian trilobite in the order Phacopida. It is a member of the family Dalmanitidae and the subfamily Dalmanitinae, although it has been classified in the related Ordovician subfamily Mucronaspidinae. The type species G. verrucosus was previously placed in Dalmania and later in Dalmanites. Because this species was considered distinct from other Dalmania and Dalmanites species, the new genus Glyptambon was erected for it in 1981.G. amsdeni and G. gassi were named in 1991 from Tennessee and Illinois, respectively.
