= Forillonaria =

Scientific classification
- Kingdom: Animalia
- Phylum: Arthropoda
- Clade: †Artiopoda
- Class: †Trilobita
- Order: †Phacopida
- Family: †Dalmanitidae
- Genus: †Forillonaria; Lesperance, 1975

Genus of trilobites

Forillonaria is a genus of trilobites in the order Phacopida, that existed during the lower Devonian in what is now Canada. It was described by Lesperance in 1975, and the type species is Forillonaria russelli. The type locality was the Grand Grève Formation in Quebec.
