= Chiarumanipyge =

Scientific classification
- Domain: Eukaryota
- Kingdom: Animalia
- Phylum: Arthropoda
- Class: †Trilobita
- Order: †Phacopida
- Family: †Calmoniidae
- Genus: †Chiarumanipyge; Branisa & Vanek, 1973

Genus of trilobites

Chiarumanipyge is a genus of trilobites in the order Phacopida that existed during the lower Devonian in what is now Bolivia. It was described by Branisa and Vanek in 1973, and the type species is Chiarumanipyge profligata. It was described from the Belén Formation.
