= Duftonia =

Scientific classification
- Domain: Eukaryota
- Kingdom: Animalia
- Phylum: Arthropoda
- Class: †Trilobita
- Order: †Phacopida
- Family: †Dalmanitidae
- Genus: †Duftonia; Dean, 1959

Genus of trilobites

Duftonia is a trilobite in the order Phacopida, that existed during the upper Ordovician in what is now England. It was described by Dean in 1959, and the type species is Duftonia lacunosa. The type locality was the Dufton Shale Formation, from which the generic name was derived.
