= Trilobus =

Trilobus Bruennich, 1781 is a disused genus of trilobites, the species of which are now all assigned to other genera.

- T. caudatus = Dalmanites caudatus
- T. punctatus Bruennich, 1781 = Encrinurus punctatus

Trilobus Bastian, 1865 is also the preoccupied name of several nematodes belonging to the subfamily Tobrilinae, that have been renamed to Tobrilus and some have since been reassigned to other genera.

- T. aequiseta = Tobrilus aequiseta
- T. allophysioides = Tobrilus altherri or T. helveticus
- T. allophysis = Tobrilus allophysis
- T. armatus = Tobrilus armatus
- T. biroi = Tobrilus biroi
- T. brevisetosus = Tobrilus brevisetosus
- T. dryophilus = Tobrilus dryophilus
- T. consimilis = Epitobrilus stefanskii
- T. gracilis = Tobrilus gracilis
- T. graciloides = Epitobrilus graciloides
- T. grandipapilloides = Paratrilobus grandipapilloides
- T. hoehnelensis = Tobrilus hoehnelensis
- T. homophysalidis = Tobrilus medius
- T. husmanni = Eutobrilus husmanni
- T. kirjanovae = Tobrilus kirjanovae
- T. leptosoma = Semitobrilus or Tobrilus pellucidus
- T. lomnickii = Tobrilus lomnickii
- T. longicauda = Tobrilus longicauda
- T. longicaudatus = Tobrilus longicaudatus
- T. macrospiculum = Tobrilus macrospiculum
- T. medius = Tobrilus medius
- T. malayanus = Epitobrilus stefanskii
- T. murisieri = Tobrilus murisieri
- T. octiespapillatus = Tobrilus octiespapillatus
- T. ornatus = Tobrilus ornatus
- T. paludicola = Epitobrilus stefanskii
- T. papillicaudatus = Eutobrilus papillicaudatus
- T. parvipapillatus = Tobrilus parvipapillatus
- T. pellucidus = Semitobrilus or Tobrilus pellucidus
- T. pseudallophysis = Tobrilus zakopanensis
- T. punctatus (Stefanski, 1916) = Tobrilus punctatus
- T. scallensis = Epitobrilus scallensis
- T. stefanskii = Epitobrilus stefanskii
- T. steineri = Epitobrilus or Eutrobilus steineri
- T. stenurus = Epitobrilus stefanskii
- T. telekiensis = Tobrilus telekiensis
- T. tenuicaudatus = Semitobrilus or Tobrilus pellucidus
- T. wesenbergi = Tobrilus wesenbergi
- T. zakopanensis = Tobrilus zakopanensis

There are also a great number of species that carry the epithet trilobus, particularly flowering plants.
