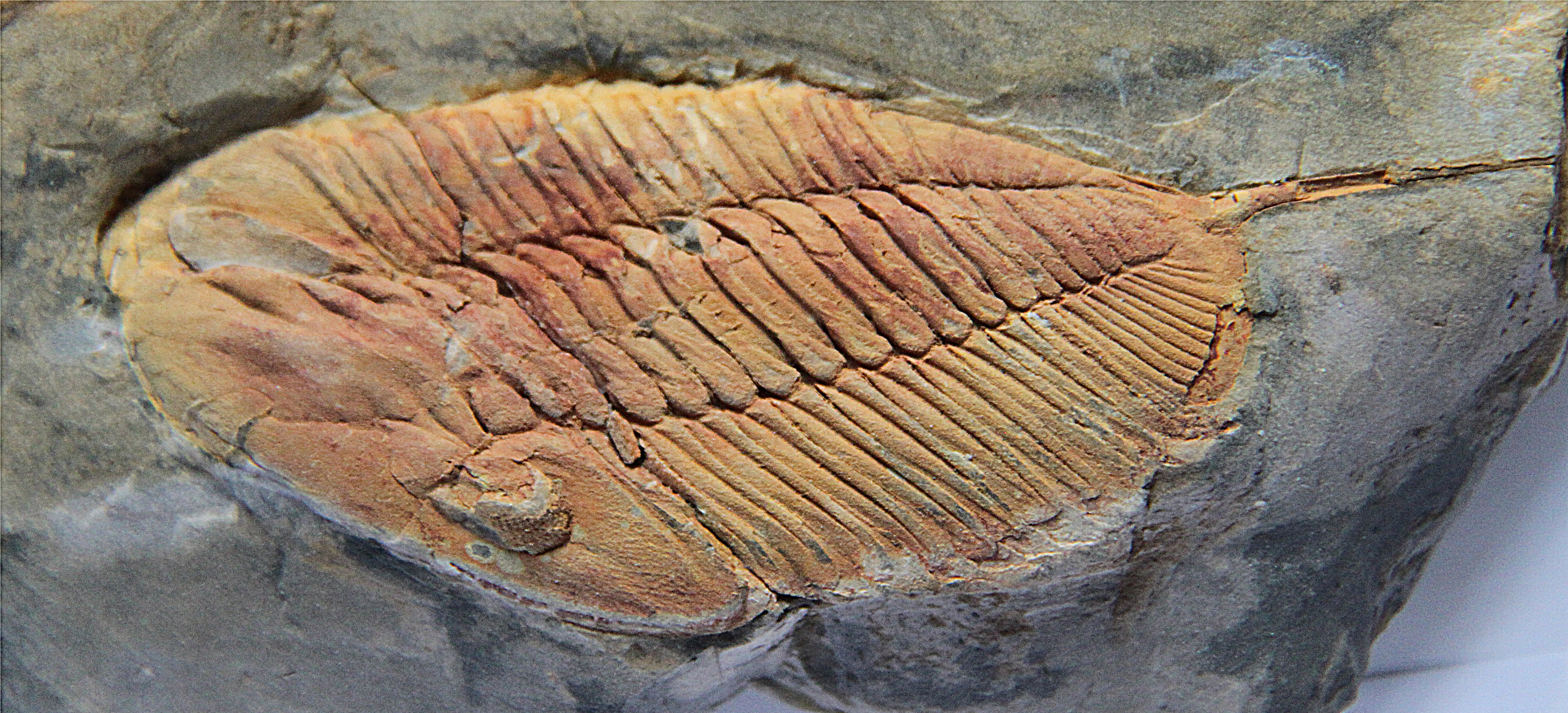
- Eodalmanitina destobesi, 6cm

Scientific classification
- Domain: Eukaryota
- Kingdom: Animalia
- Phylum: Arthropoda
- Class: †Trilobita
- Order: †Phacopida
- Family: †Dalmanitidae
- Genus: †Eodalmanitina; Henry, 1964

= Eodalmanitina =

Eodalmanitina Temporal range: 460.9–457.5 Ma

Genus of trilobites

Eodalmanitina is a trilobite in the order Phacopida, that existed during the middle Ordovician in what is now France. It was described by Henry in 1964, and the type species is Eodalmanitina macropthalma, which was originally described under the genus Calymene by Brongniart in 1822. The type locality was in Loire-Atlantique.
