= Fenestra =

Small opening or pore

A fenestra (fenestration; pl.: fenestrae or fenestrations) is any small opening or pore, commonly used as a term in the biological sciences. It is the Latin word for "window", and is used in various fields to describe a pore in an anatomical structure.

== Biological morphology ==
In morphology, fenestrae are found in cancellous bones, particularly in the skull. In anatomy, the round window and oval window are also known as the fenestra rotunda and the fenestra ovalis. In microanatomy, fenestrae are found in endothelium of fenestrated capillaries, enabling the rapid exchange of molecules between the blood and surrounding tissue. The elastic layer of the tunica intima is a fenestrated membrane. In surgery, a fenestration is a new opening made in a part of the body to enable drainage or access.

== Plant biology and mycology ==
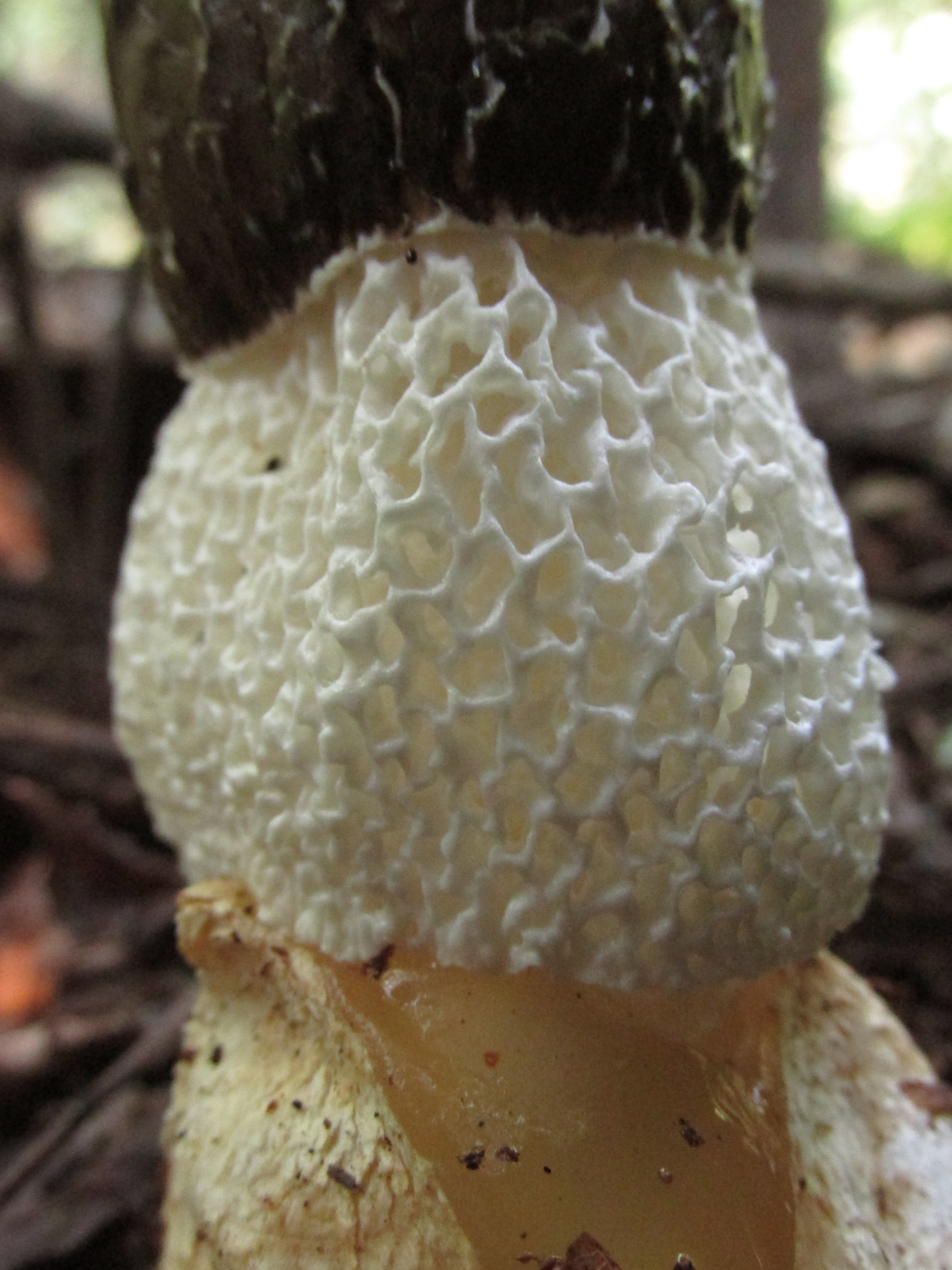
Phallus duplicatus

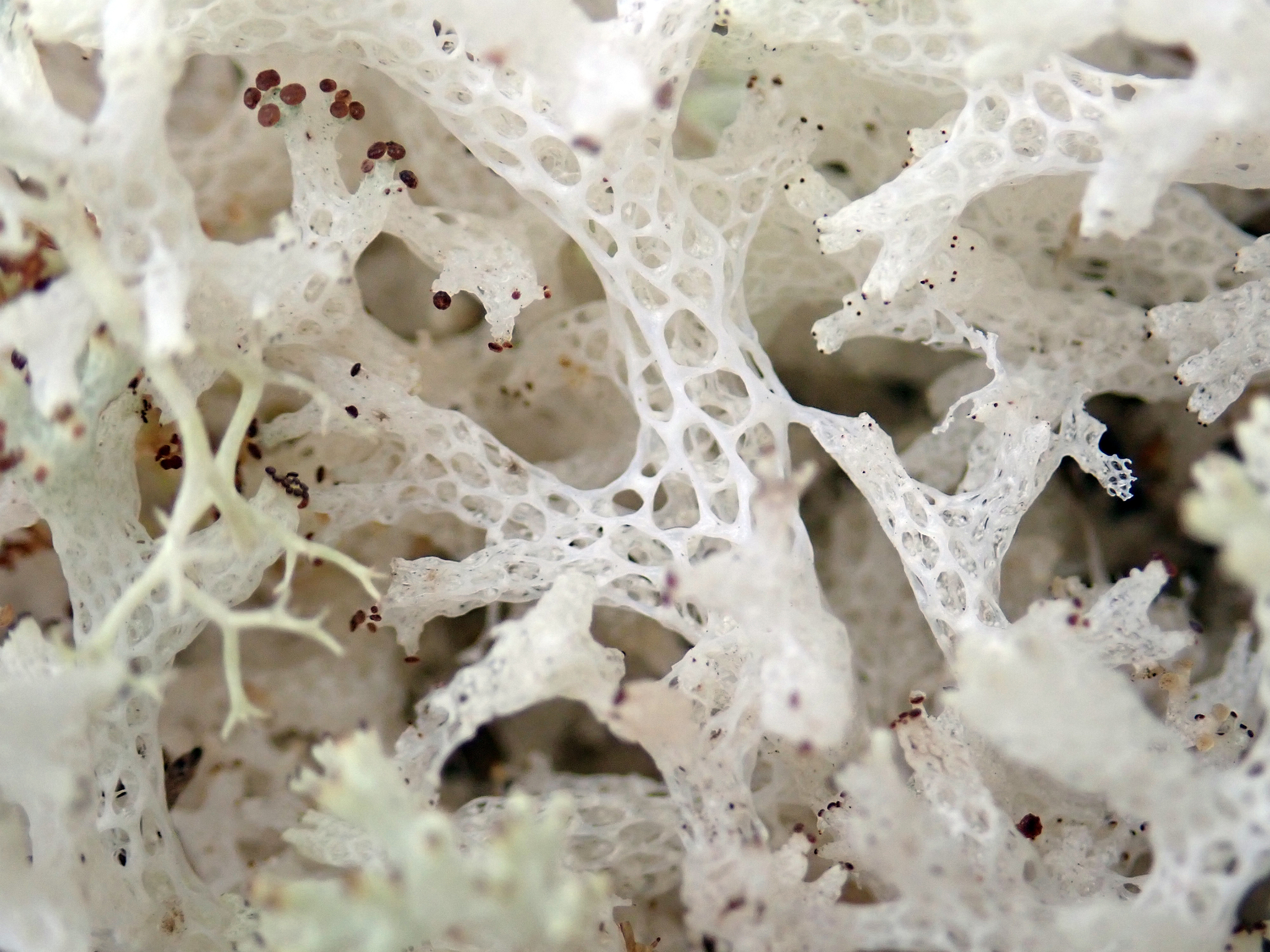
Pulchrocladia retipora

In plant biology, the perforations in a perforate leaf are also described as fenestrae, and the leaf is called a fenestrate leaf. The leaf window is also known as a fenestra, and is a translucent structure that transmits light, as in Fenestraria.

Examples of fenestrate structures in the fungal kingdom include the symmetrically arranged gaps in the indusium ("skirt") of the mushroom Phallus duplicatus, and the thallus of the coral lichen Pulchrocladia retipora.

== Zoology ==
In zoology, the trilobite Fenestraspis possessed extensive fenestrae in the posterior part of the body. In the Paleognathae, there is an ilio–ischiatic fenestra.

Fenestrae are also used to distinguish the three types of amniote:

The ancestor of the amniotes is a primitive lizard, Hylonomus. From this reptile, three groups of amniotes would evolve: anapsids, diapsids, and synapsids. These broad groupings of amniotes are most easily differentiated by the presence and number of holes in the skull behind the eye socket. Those gaps, or holes, are called fenestrae, meaning "windows." The anapsids are the most primitive members of the group. They have a complete skull, with no gaps. ... The diapsids [including lizards, dinosaurs, and birds] have two fenestrae in their skulls, one directly behind the eye socket and one just slightly above. [160] The synapsids [including mammals] have just one fenestra, behind the eye socket.
