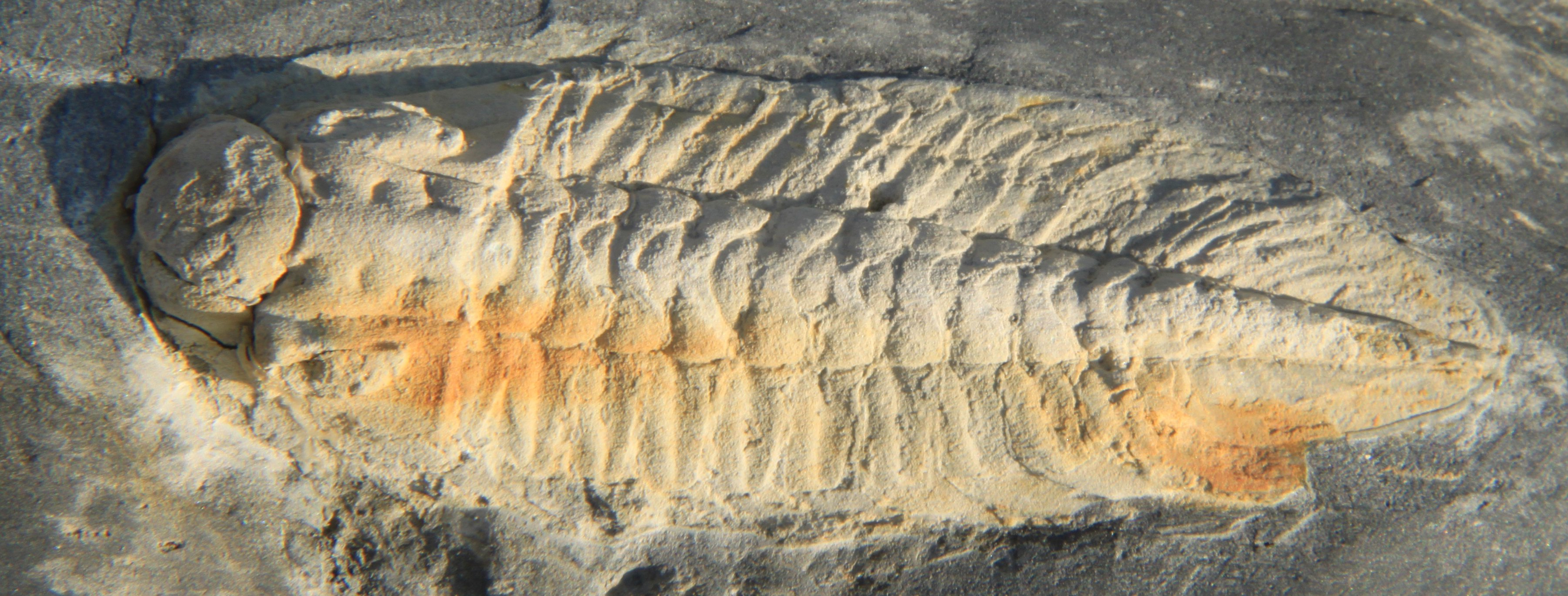
- Zeliszkella torrubiae, 6½cm long

Scientific classification
- Domain: Eukaryota
- Kingdom: Animalia
- Phylum: Arthropoda
- Class: †Trilobita
- Order: †Phacopida
- Family: †Dalmanitidae
- Genus: †Zeliszkella; Delo, 1935

Species
- Z. deshayesi (Barrande, 1846) (type species) = Phacops deshayesi; Z. torrubiae (Verneuil & Barrande, 1855) = Dalmanites torrubiae, Z. lapeyrei; Z. hawlei (Barrande, 1846) ssp. Z. h. hawlei Z. h. pandora Snajdr, 1987; Z. renaudae Henry, 1980; Z. toledana Hammann, 1971; Z. velai Corbacho, 2011

= Zeliszkella =

Zeliszkella Temporal range: Darriwilian to Katian

Genus of trilobites

Zeliszkella is a genus of trilobite in the order Phacopida, with species of average size. Species are known from the Middle and Upper Ordovician and have been found in the Czech Republic, France, Morocco, Portugal and Spain.

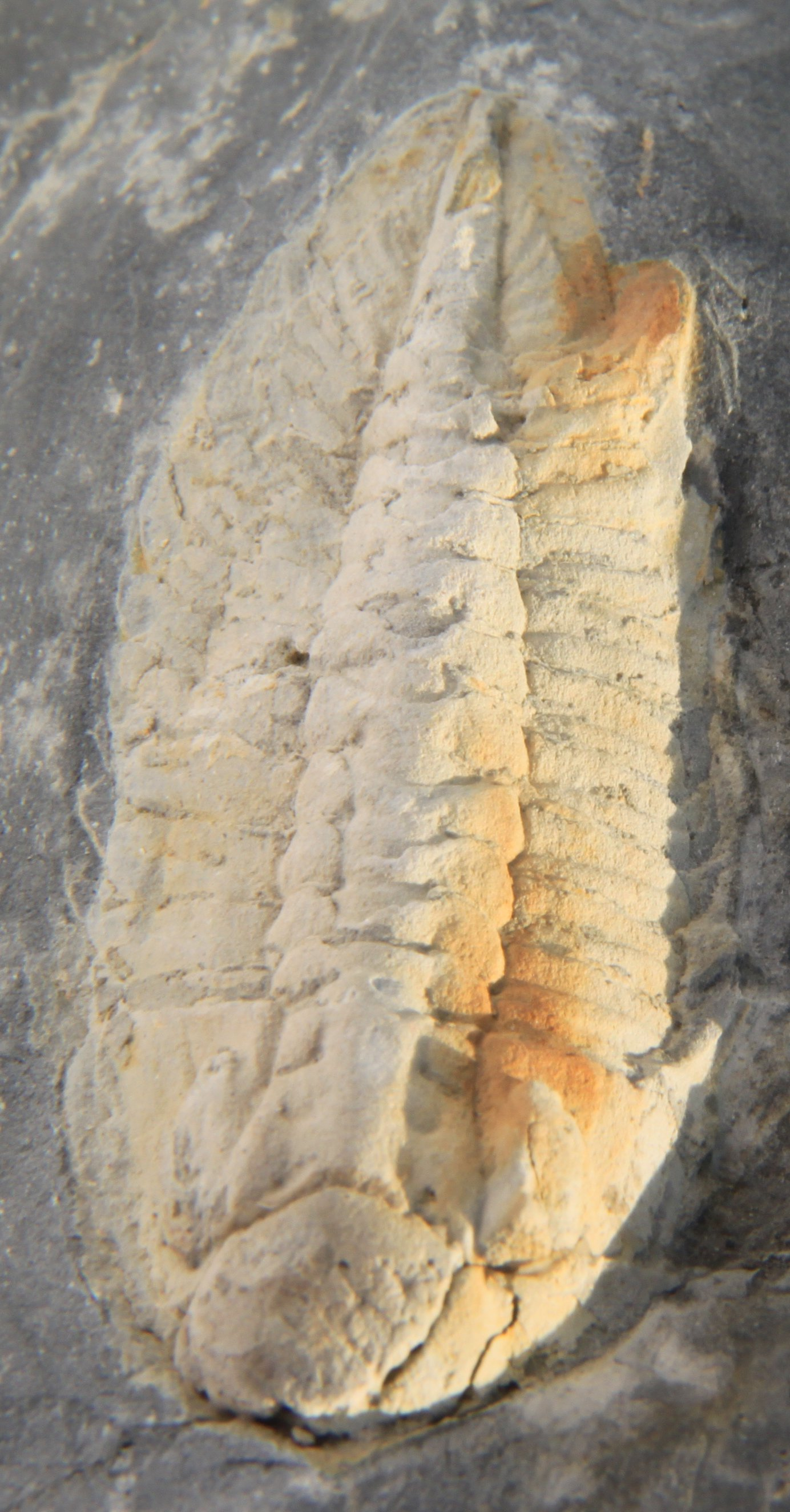
Z. torrubiae

The cephalon has a rather narrow frontal area, and the anterior sections of the facial sutures run close to frontal lobe anteriorly. The large mosaic (schizochroal) eyes reach far backward. The main body (or thorax) is composed of eleven segments. The side lobes (pleurae) of the thorax curve stronger backward closer to the tail shield (or pygidium), their pointed tips longer than those of anterior pleurae. The pygidium is elongate subtriangular with the axis narrowly triangular reaching the back of the pygidium and consisting of about 10 rings. The pleural fields have 3 or 4 ribs.

== Taxonomy ==
=== Reassigned species ===
Some species formerly included in Zeliszkella have now been reassigned to other genera.

- Z. neltneri = Phacopidina neltneri
- Z. zguidensis = Morgatia zguidensis
