= Eldredgeia =

Eldredgeia Temporal range: Devonian

Scientific classification
- Domain: Eukaryota
- Kingdom: Animalia
- Phylum: Arthropoda
- Class: †Trilobita
- Order: †Phacopida
- Family: †Calmoniidae
- Genus: †Eldredgeia; Lieberman, 1993

Genus of trilobites

Eldredgeia is a genus of trilobites in the order Phacopida, suborder Phacopina, family Calmoniidae. This genus comes from the Devonian of South America and South Africa, usually found in nodules. The trilobite Eldredgeia venusta, from Bolivia, is the most common South American trilobite on today's fossil market, and even then it is not all that common. This genus has a spiny pygidium and usually the eye facets are well preserved.

== Species ==
- Eldredgeia venustus from the Sicasica Formation, La Paz Department, Bolivia (holotype). Also known from the Upper Member of the Belén Formation, La Paz Department, and the Pimenteira Formation Givetian
- Eldredgeia cf. E. venustus from South Africa. Eifelian.
- Eldredgeia paituna (Hartt and Rathbun 1875) from the Erere Sandstone, Para, Brazil. Eifelian.
- Eldredgeia eocryphaeus, from the Lower Member of the Belén Formation, Scaphiocoelia

Assemblage Zone, Tikani, Estacion de Bombeo, Sicasica, La Paz Department (holotype). Also collected from the Gamoneda Formation, Cerro Picacho, 17 km S of Tarija, Tarija Department. Late Lochkovian to early Pragian.

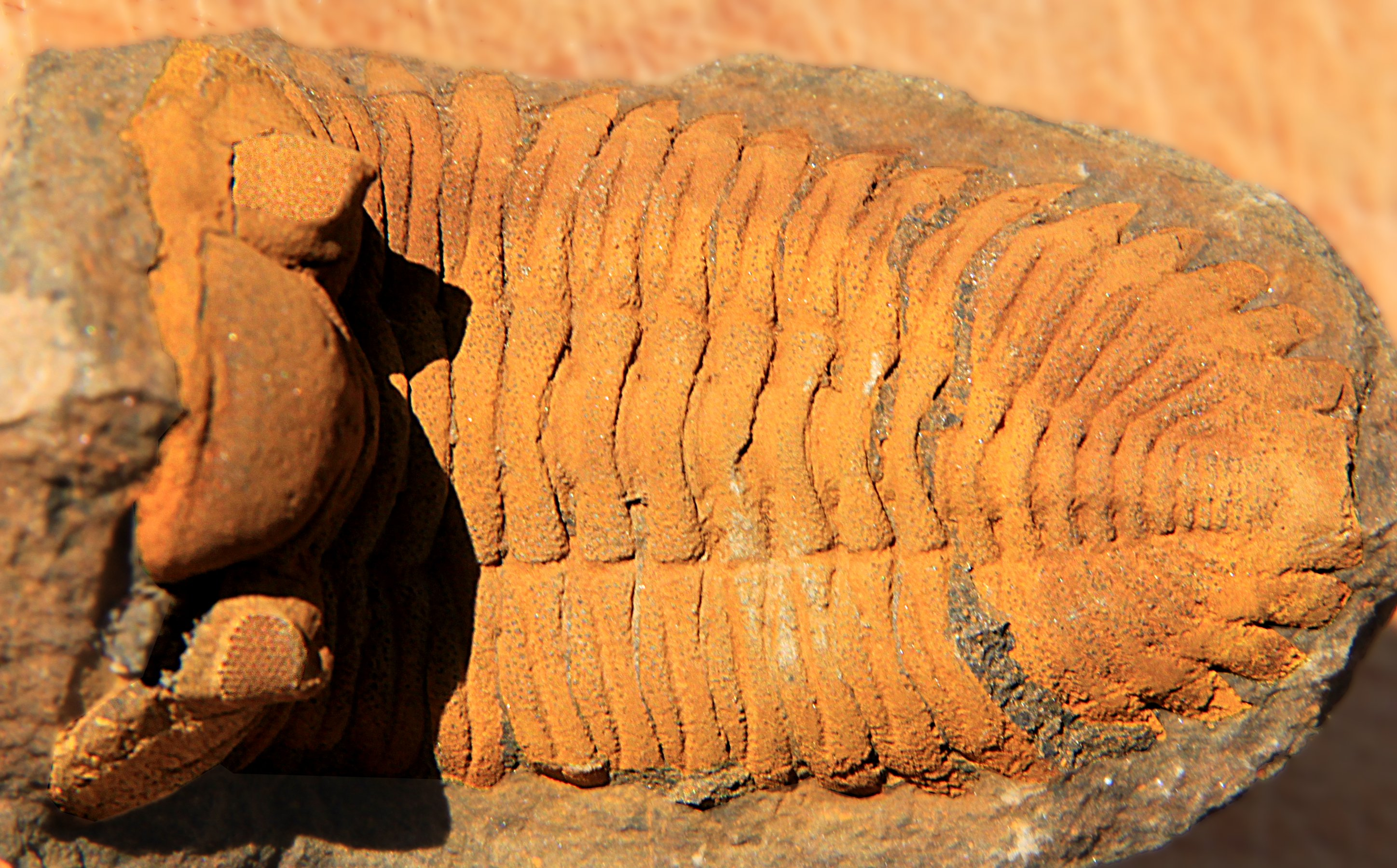
Eldredgeia venustus

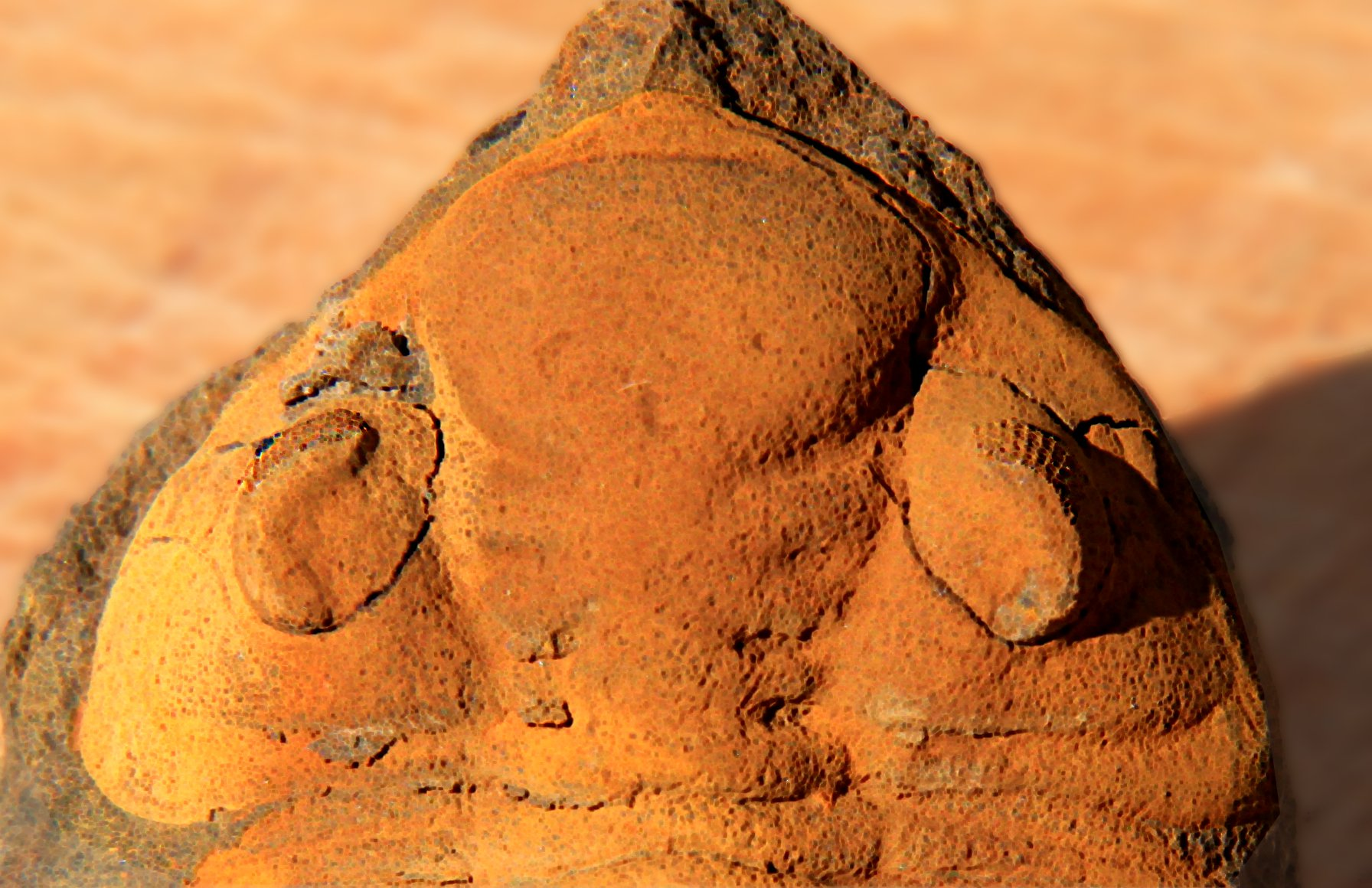
Eldredgeia venustus, dorsal view of the head

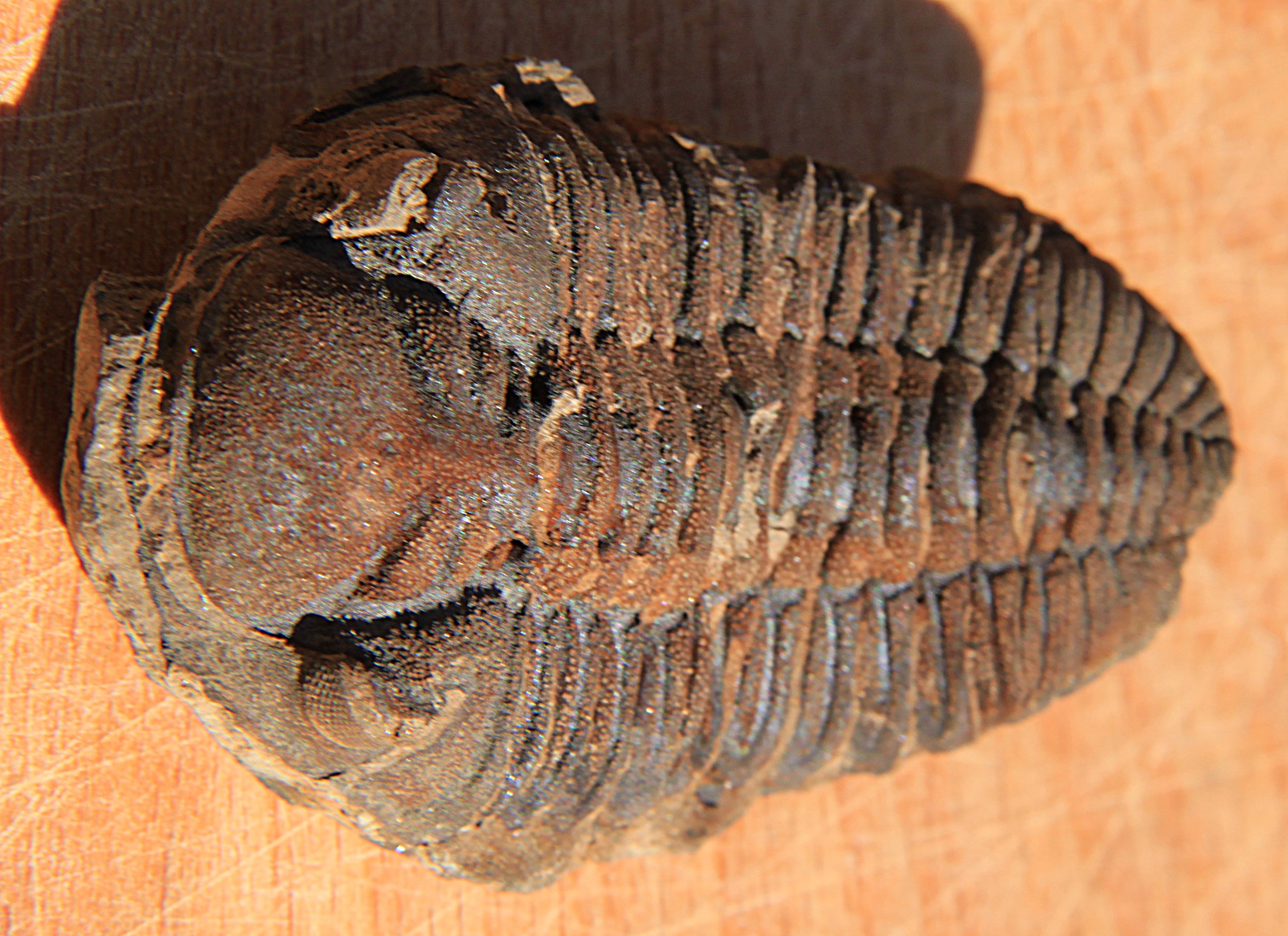
Eldredgeia eocryphaea

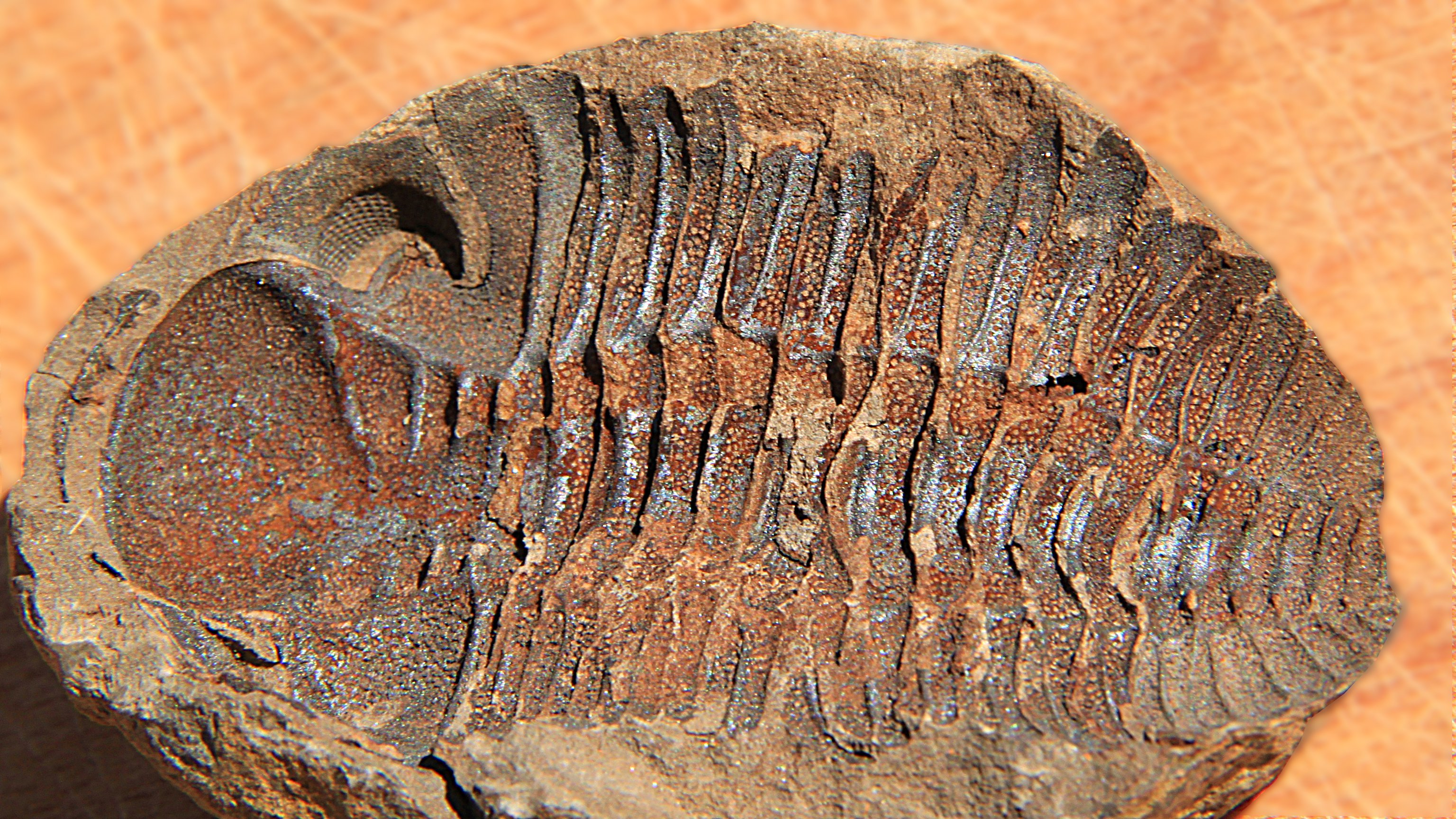
Eldredgeia eocryphaea, negative imprint
