= Anchiopella =

Anchiopella Temporal range: Early Devonian

Scientific classification
- Domain: Eukaryota
- Kingdom: Animalia
- Phylum: Arthropoda
- Class: †Trilobita
- Order: †Phacopida
- Family: †Calmoniidae
- Genus: †Anchiopella; Reed, 1907

Genus of trilobites

Anchiopella is a genus of trilobites in the order Phacopida, which existed in Early Devonian times in what is now South Africa. It was described by Reed in 1907, and the type species is Anchiopella cristagalli, which was originally described as Encrinurus cristagalli by Woodward in 1873.
