= Blanodalmanites =

Scientific classification
- Kingdom: Animalia
- Phylum: Arthropoda
- Clade: †Artiopoda
- Class: †Trilobita
- Order: †Phacopida
- Family: †Dalmanitidae
- Genus: †Blanodalmanites; Kobayashi & Hamada, 1972

Extinct genus of trilobites

Blanodalmanites is a genus of trilobites in the order Phacopida, which existed in what is now Malaysia. It was described by Kobayashi and Hamada in 1972, and the type species is Blanodalmanites nubelania.
