= Malvinella buddeae =

Malvinella buddeae Temporal range: Devonian

Scientific classification
- Domain: Eukaryota
- Kingdom: Animalia
- Phylum: Arthropoda
- Class: †Trilobita
- Order: †Phacopida
- Family: †Calmoniidae
- Genus: †Malvinella
- Species: †M. buddeae

Binomial name
- †Malvinella buddeae Lieberman, Edgecombe & Eldredge, 1991

Extinct species of trilobite

Malvinella buddeae is a species of trilobite which lived in La Paz, Bolivia during the Devonian period.
