= Furacopyge =

Scientific classification
- Kingdom: Animalia
- Phylum: Arthropoda
- Clade: †Artiopoda
- Class: †Trilobita
- Order: †Phacopida
- Family: †Dalmanitidae
- Genus: †Furacopyge; Arbizu, 1978

Genus of trilobites

Furacopyge is a genus of trilobites in the order Phacopida (family Dalmanitidae), that existed during the lower Devonian in what is now Spain. It was described by Arbizu in 1978, and the type species is Furacopyge progenitor. The type locality was Complejo de Ranaces.
