= Crozonaspis =

Scientific classification
- Domain: Eukaryota
- Kingdom: Animalia
- Phylum: Arthropoda
- Class: †Trilobita
- Order: †Phacopida
- Family: †Dalmanitidae
- Genus: †Crozonaspis; Henry, 1968

Genus of trilobites

Crozonaspis is a trilobite in the order Phacopida, that existed during the middle Ordovician in what is now France. It was described by Henry in 1968, and the type species is Crozonaspis struvei. It was described from Brittany.
