= Calmonia =

Calmonia Temporal range: Emsian-Eifelian ~395–388 Ma

Scientific classification
- Kingdom: Animalia
- Phylum: Arthropoda
- Clade: †Artiopoda
- Class: †Trilobita
- Order: †Phacopida
- Family: †Calmoniidae
- Genus: †Calmonia; Clarke, 1913

Genus of trilobites

Calmonia is an extinct genus of trilobites. It contains one species: C. curvioculata. Fossils of Calmonia have been found in the Emsian to Eifelian Ponta Grossa Formation and Chapada Group of Brazil, the Belén and Sica Sica Formations of Bolivia and the Cordobés Formation of Uruguay.
