= Icla Formation =

Geologic formation in Bolivia

- Stratigraphic range: Pragian - Emsian
- Type: Geological formation
- Underlies: Huamampampa Formation
- Overlies: Santa Rosa Formation

Location
- Region: Sub-alpine region
- Country: Bolivia

The Icla Formation is an early Devonian formation from Bolivia. It preserves a moderately diverse fauna of trilobites, brachiopods, crinoids and a few species of jawed fish.

== Paleobiota ==
Color key: Taxon / Reclassified taxon / Taxon falsely reported as present / Dubious taxon or junior synonym / Ichnotaxon / Ootaxon / Morphotaxon	Notes; Uncertain or tentative taxa are in small text; ~~crossed out~~ taxa are discredited.

Paleobiota
Genus	Species	Higher taxon	Notes	Images
Ramirosuarezia	R. boliviana	Gnathostomata	Resembles a mix of gnathostome groups, may be the same as Zamponiopteron	
Pucapampella	P. rodrigae	Stem-Chondrichthyes	Also known from the Belèn Formation, one of the most basal known cartilaginous fish	Fossilized jaws and teeth of P. rodrigae (A-C, G-H) and cartilage elements of Zamponiopteron (D-F), which may belong to the same animal, from the Department of Puno, Peru. Scale bar = 0.5 cm
Meperocrinus	M. angelina	Emperocrinidae (Camerata)	Has unusual wing-shaped extensions of its calyx	
Lutocrinus	L. boliviaensis	Rhodocrinitidae (Diplobathrida)		
Griphocrinus	G. pirovanoi	Dimerocrinitidae (Diplobathrida)		
Legrandella	L. lombardii	Prosomapoda	A "synziphosurine" chelicerate	Reconstruction of L. lombardii
Maurotarion	M. dereimsi, M. racheboufi	Aulacopleuridae (Proetida)		
Bainella	B. (Belenops) insolita	Calmoniidae		
Deltacephalaspis	D. (Prestalia) tumida	Calmoniidae		
Schizostylus	S. (Schizostylus) ?brevicaudatus	Calmoniidae		
Probolops	P. glabellirostris	Calmoniidae		
Kozlowskiaspis	K. (Kozlowskiapis) superna	Calmoniidae		
Acastoides?	?A. verneuili	Calmoniidae		
Phacopina	P. padilla	Calmoniidae		
Plesiomalvinella	P. pujravii, P. boulei	Calmoniidae		
Malvinella	M. haugi	Calmoniidae		
Vogesina	V. devonica, V. lacunafera	Calmoniidae	Formerly classed in the genus Phacopina	
Nuculites	N. beneckei, N. oblongatus	Malletiidae		
Palaeoneilo	P. rhysa?	Malletiidae		
Phestia	P. inornata?	Nuculanidae		
Bolitheca	B. steinmanni	Orthothecida		
Bolithes	B. crasquinae	Hyolithida		
Protoleptostrophia	P. concinna	Stropheodontidae (Strophomenoidea)		
Schuchertella	S. sp?	Schuchertellidae (Orthotetida)		
Australostrophia	A. mesembrina	Chonostrophiidae (Chonetidina)		
Pleurochonetes	P. anteloi, P. lauriata	Chonetidae (Chonetidina)	P. anteloi was formerly placed in its own genus (Gamonetes) before being synonymised	
Notiochonetes	N. falklandica	Chonetidae (Chonetidina)		
Kentronetes	K. iclaense	Chonetidina	Formerly included in Quadrikentron, but split out into its own genus	
Antelocoelia	A. johnsoni	Leptocoeliidae (Rhynchonellida)		
Australocoelia	A. palmata	Leptocoeliidae (Rhynchonellida)		
Meristelloides	M. rikowskii	Meristellidae (Athyridida)		
Australospirifer	A. hawkinsi	Delthyrididae (Spiriferida)		
Metaplasia	M. pseudoumbonata	Ambocoeliidae (Spiriferida)		
Plicoplasia	P. planoconvexa	Ambocoeliidae (Spiriferida)		
Proboscidina	P. arcei	Centronellidae (Terebratulida)		
Mutationella	M. sp	Mutationellidae (Terebratulida)		
Podolella	P. sp	Mutationellidae (Terebratulida)		
Derbyina	D. smithi, D. jamesiana	Mutationellidae (Terebratulida)		
Pleurothyrella	P. knodi	Mutationellidae (Terebratulida)		
Scaphiocoelia	S. boliviana	Mutationellidae (Terebratulida)		
Cryptonella	C. baini	Cryptonellidae (Terebratulida)		
Conularia	C. quichua, C. albertensis	Conulariida		
Paraconularia	P. ulrichiana, P. africana	Conulariida		
