= Dalmaniturus =

Scientific classification
- Kingdom: Animalia
- Phylum: Arthropoda
- Clade: †Artiopoda
- Class: †Trilobita
- Order: †Phacopida
- Family: †Dalmanitidae
- Genus: †Dalmaniturus; Chernysheva, 1937

Genus of trilobites

Dalmaniturus is a genus of trilobites in the order Phacopida, that existed during the lower Silurian in what is now western Mongolia. It was described by Chernysheva in 1937, and the type species is Dalmaniturus weberi.
