= Argentopyge =

Scientific classification
- Kingdom: Animalia
- Phylum: Arthropoda
- Clade: †Artiopoda
- Class: †Trilobita
- Order: †Phacopida
- Family: †Dalmanitidae
- Genus: †Argentopyge; Baldis, 1972

Extinct genus of trilobites

Argentopyge is a genus of trilobite in the order Phacopida, which existed in what is now Argentina. It was described by Baldis in 1972, and the type species is Argentopyge argentina.
