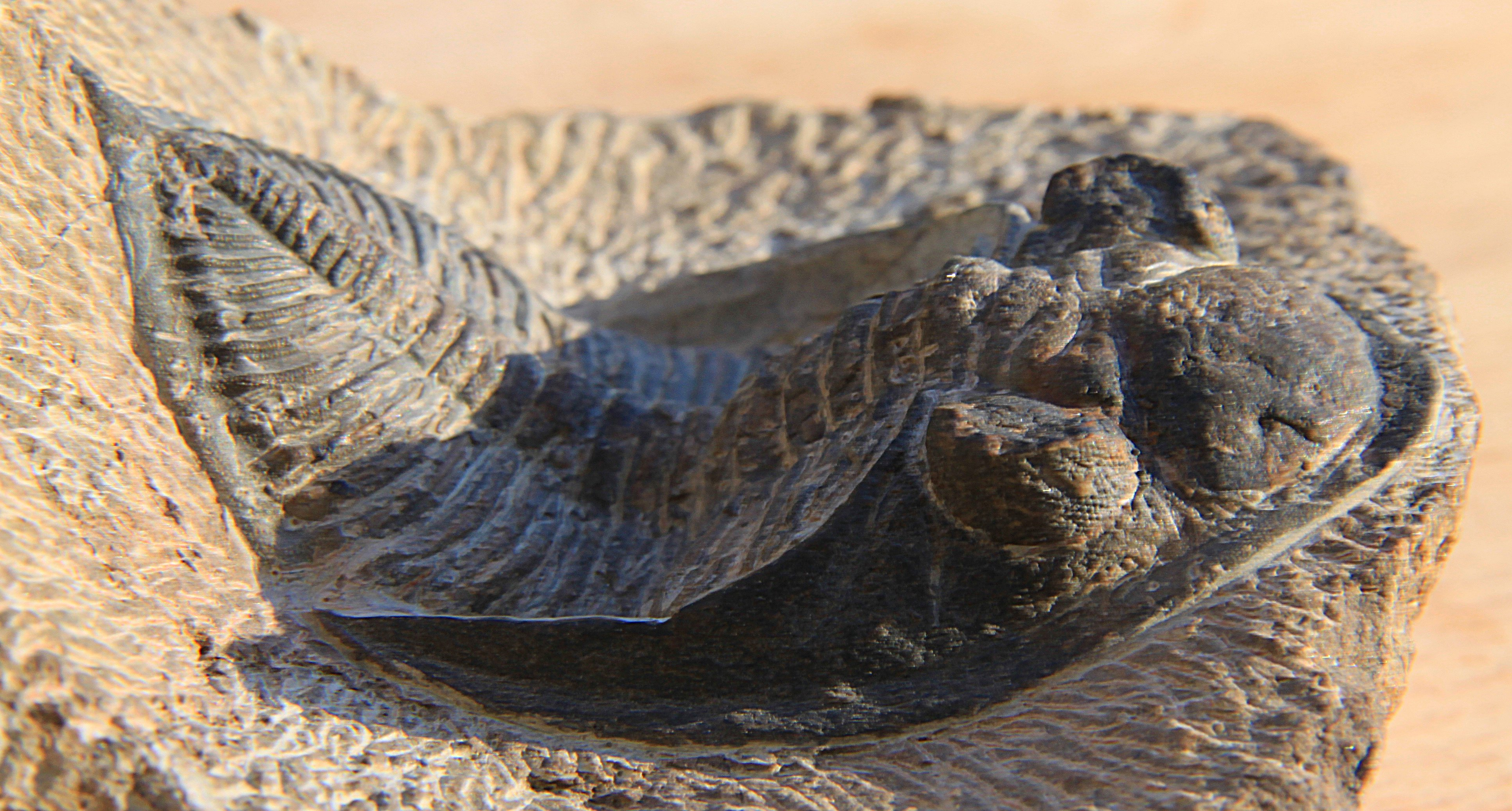
- Odontochile sp., 73mm, collected near Hamar Laghdad, Morocco

Scientific classification
- Kingdom: Animalia
- Phylum: Arthropoda
- Clade: †Artiopoda
- Class: †Trilobita
- Order: †Phacopida
- Family: †Dalmanitidae
- Genus: †Odontochile; Hawle & Corda, 1847

Species
- O. hausmanni (Brongniart, 1822), (type), = Asaphus hausmanni; O. cristata Hawle & Corda, 1847; O. maccoyi (Barrande); O. seillouensis; O. spiniferum

Synonyms
- Hausmannia

= Odontochile =

Odontochile Temporal range: Silurian–Devonian

Genus of trilobites

Odontochile is a genus of trilobites in the order Phacopida, family Dalmanitidae.

These trilobites were fast-moving low-level epifauna and detritivore. They lived in the Devonian period, from 414 to 391 million years ago.

== Distribution ==
Silurian of China; Silurian to Devonian of Australia and the United States; Devonian of Algeria, Canada, the Czech Republic, France, Germany, Kazakhstan, Morocco and Spain.

== Description ==
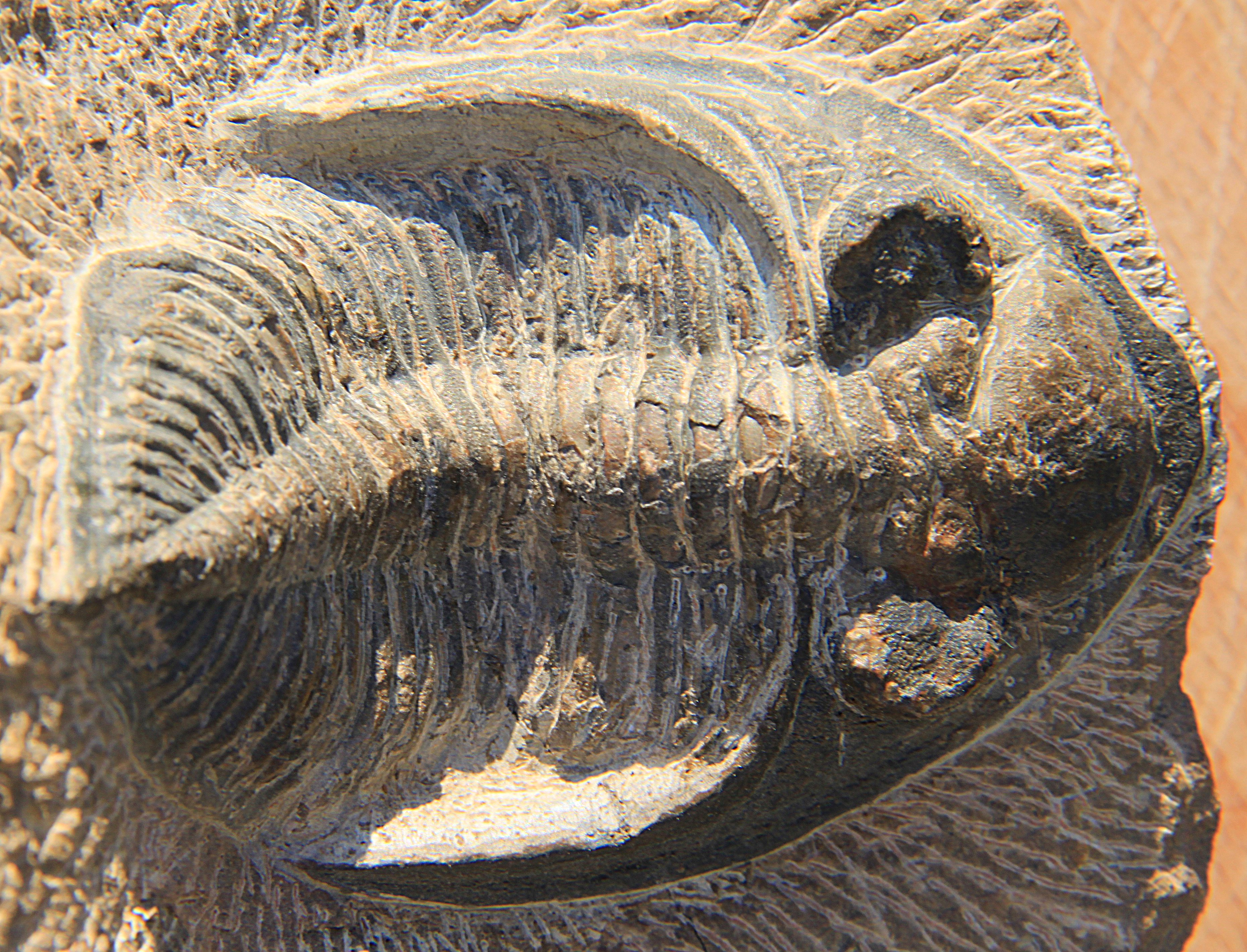
Odontochile sp., dorsal view

Odontochile is genus of trilobites with a large (about 15 centimetres or 5.9 inches long), moderately vaulted exoskeleton with an inverted egg-shaped outline (about 1.6× longer than wide). Its headshield (or cephalon) is semicircular, with long (genal) spines extending from the side of the cephalon back to the tailshield (or pygidium). The frontal margin of the cephalon is semicircular to parabolic, and lacks an anterior extension. The facial suture lies in front of the preglabellar furrow. The frontal lobe of the central raised area of the cephalon (or glabella) is much wider than the other lobes. The frontal lobe is vaulted. The eye is very large, almost touching the lateral and the posterior border furrow. The eye lobe is much higher than the glabella. The "seem" that is visible from the ventral side (or doublure) is wide and flat, and has a deep and wide. The "palate" (or hypostome), also only visible from the ventral side, is elongated subtriangular (about 1 1/2× wider than long) and adorned with three prominent spines at its back rim, and two weaker ones more to the side. To the front the hypostome has robust wings extending sideways. The thorax consists of 11 segments. The tips of the segments are leaf-shaped, pointed and angle back at about 30°. The pygidium is large, subtriangular, and about 2/3-3/4× as long as wide. The axis is vaulted and 20-25% of the width of the pygidium and consists of 16-20 rings. 13–14 deep and wide pleural furrows have flat or only slightly concave bottoms. The furrows within each pleural rib (or interpleural furrows) are very narrow. The frontal band of each pleural rib is more vaulted and broader than the rear band. The pleural furrows stay clear of the margin by a distance comparable to that of length (measured along the midline) of an axial ring. The pygidial termination (or mucro) is vaulted and more or less pointed into a short broad-based spine; in derived species this spine is longer. The entire exoskeleton is covered in fine and coarse granules.

=== Differences with related genera ===
Reussiana is much like Odontochile, but has a much flatter exoskeleton, 17-21 pygidial axial rings, 15-18 pleural furrows and lacks a medial terminal spine.
Zlichovaspis has a subtriangular cephalon with a short median processus, a subtriangular pygidium, and a longer medial terminal spine. In Zlichovaspis (Devonodontochile) the anterior median processus is tongue-shaped, the terminal spine is even longer and slimmer, and uniquely, all elevated parts are perforated by large pores.
Dalmanites has genal spines that extend to the 8th thorax segment from the front. The facial suture (almost) coincides with the frontal glabellar furrow. Eye smaller, staying clear of the lateral and posterior border furrows. The hypostome is about as wide as long with three blunt denticles. Tips of the thorax segments point increasingly further backwards as these are situated nearer to the pygidium with the last one pointing parallel to the midline. The pleural furrows of the pygidium almost touch its margin.

== Taxonomy ==
=== Species previously assigned to Odontochile ===
- O. branisi = Francovichia branisi
- O. rugosa = Zlichovaspis rugosa

=== Genera that may be confused with Odontochile ===
- Odontocheila, a genus of beetles
