= USS Francovich =

USS Francovich has been the name of more than one United States Navy ship, and may refer to:

- USS Francovich (DE-379), a destroyer escort cancelled in 1944
- USS Francovich (DE-606), a destroyer escort converted during construction into the fast transport USS Francovich (APD-116)
- USS Francovich (APD-116), a fast transport in commission from 1945 to 1946
