= Delops =

Scientific classification
- Domain: Eukaryota
- Kingdom: Animalia
- Phylum: Arthropoda
- Class: †Trilobita
- Order: †Phacopida
- Family: †Dalmanitidae
- Genus: †Delops; Rickards, 1964

Genus of arthropods (fossil)

Delops is a trilobite in the order Phacopida, that existed during the upper Silurian in what is now England. It was described by Rickards in 1964, and the type species is Delops obtusicaudatus, which was originally described under the genus Phacops by Salter in 1849. The type locality was the Middle Coldwell Beds.
