= Pucapampella =

Pucapampella Temporal range: Middle Devonian Emsian

Scientific classification
- Kingdom: Animalia
- Phylum: Chordata
- Class: Chondrichthyes
- Family: †Pucapampellidae
- Genus: †Pucapampella; Janvier & Suárez-Riglos, 1986

Type species
- Pucapampella rodrigae Janvier & Suárez-Riglos, 1986

Synonyms
- Zamponiopteron? Janvier & Suárez-Riglos, 1986

Extinct genus of cartilaginous fishes

Pucapampella is an extinct genus of cartilaginous fish from the Middle Devonian of Bolivia and Peru. As currently defined it includes only the type species P. rodrigae, although it is possible several yet-unnamed species are represented under this name. Spine-like organs assigned to the genus Zamponiopteron may belong to Pucapampella, but the two are not known to be directly associated. Pucapampella is one of the earliest known cartilaginous fish, and is unique due to features of its skull and teeth.

== Discovery and naming ==
Pucapampella rodrigae was described in 1986 by paleontologists Philippe Janvier and Mario Suárez-Riglos, based on three isolated skull fragments discovered in Bolivia. These remains are preserved in concretions and were initially identified as being from the Middle Devonian (Givetian stage) Sica Sica Formation and Huamampampa Formation, although they were not identified in situ (at the site of origin) and are now thought to have originated from the older Early Devonian (Emsian stage) Belén Formation. A number of additional isolated skull fragments and a relatively complete braincase have subsequently been identified from Bolivia, including material from the Icla Formation. Later fossils discovered in phosphate nodules from the Chagrapi Formation of the Department of Puno, Peru have also been assigned to Pucapampella. An articulated skull and jaws from the Emsian-stage Gydo Formation of South Africa was described in 2001 and also tentatively assigned to the genus, although this specimen has since been reassigned to Gydoselache.

The genus name honors the village of Pucapampa where the holotype specimen originated, and the species name, P. rodrigae, honors Gabriela Rodrigo who discovered the specimen.

== Description ==
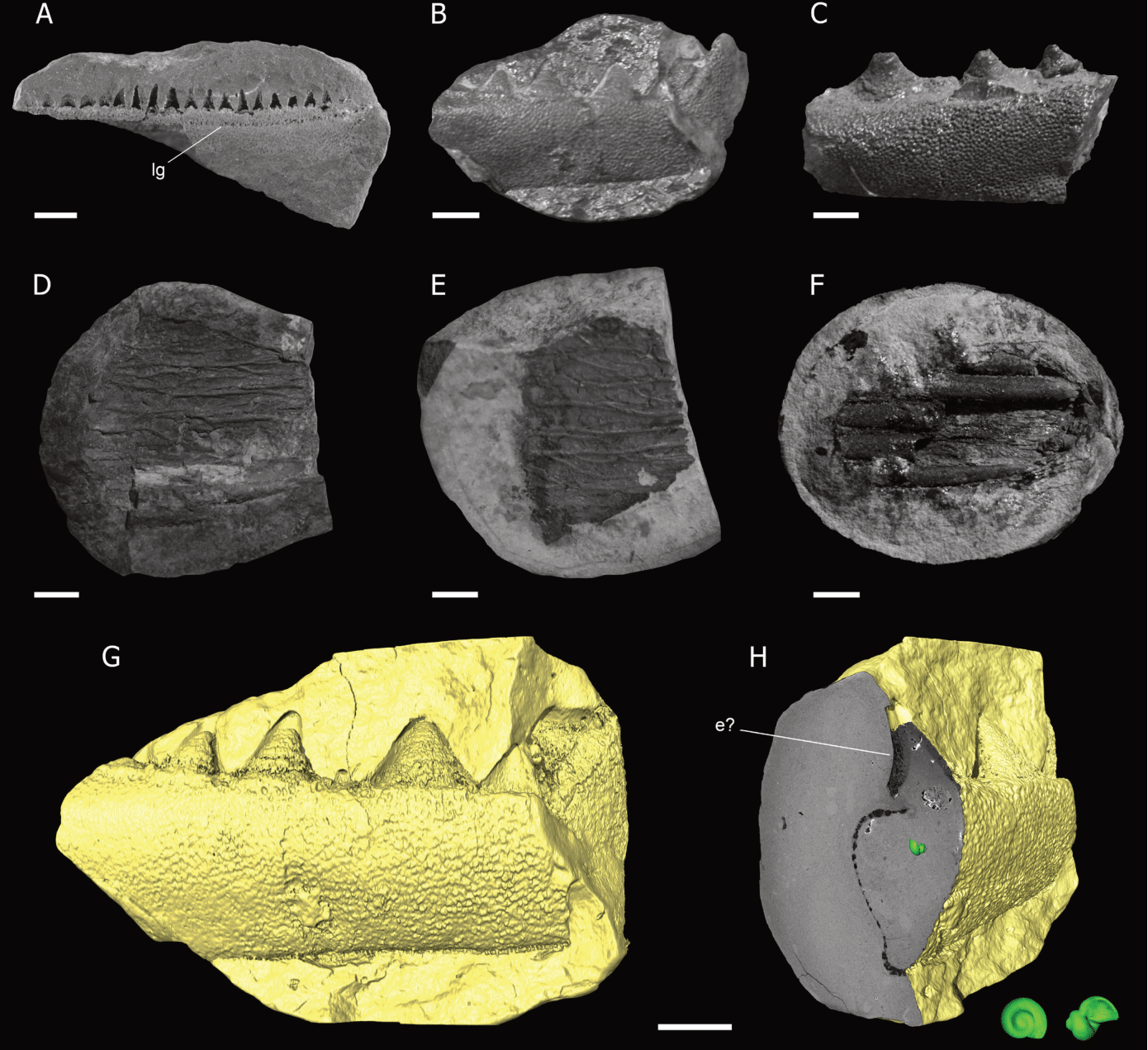
Fossilized jaws and teeth of P. rodrigae (A-C, G-H) and cartilage elements of Zamponiopteron (D-F), which may belong to the same animal, from the Department of Puno, Peru. Scale bar = 0.5 cm

Pucapampella rodrigae is known from fossils of the cranium and jaws. Uniquely among cartilaginous fish, Pucapampella's teeth were skeletally attached to the palatoquadrates (upper jaws) and Meckel's cartilages(lower jaws), rather than being attached by soft tissue like other members of the Class. The known skeleton of adult Pucapampella was covered in mineralized tessellations, a distinctive feature of Chondrichthyes, but these structures were apparently absent in juveniles. The cranium was divided into two unfused, transversely-aligned segments by a cranial fissure, another feature unique among cartilaginous fishes.

Isolated fragments of postcranial cartilage are known from the same deposits as Pucapampella, although it is unclear if these belong to the same animal. These remains include several forms of plate-like structure assigned to the genus Zamponiopteron. Because these remains show no indication of tessellated cartilage, it has been questioned if they originated from a chondrichthyan at all.

In life, Pucapampella likely possessed well-developed subcephalic (beneath the skull) muscles which functioned to join the two segments of its neurocranium, similar to those of lobe-finned fish, bichirs, and certain living sharks.

== Classification ==
When first described, Pucapampella was thought to be a possible member of the Bradyodonti (an assemblage of early chimaera relatives). The discovery of more complete fossils has led to Pucapampella being considered a stem-group cartilaginous fish, and potentially the sister taxon to all other members of the Class. Features such as the divided cranium and associated subcephalic muscles are thought to be primitive traits among gnathostomes, which are retained in Pucapampella but lost in other members of Chondrichthyes. Below is a simplified cladogram from a 2020 paper by Frey and coauthors, whose phylogenetic analysis recovered Pucapampella and Gydoselache outside crown-group Chondrichthyes.

- Conventionally-defined Chondrichthyes
  - Gladbachus
  - - - Gydoselache
      - Pucapampella
    - - Doliodus
      - Crown-group Chondrichthyes
        - Holocephali (chimaeras and kin)
        - Elasmobranchii (true sharks, rays, and kin)

While only P. rodrigae has been named, it has been proposed that multiple species of Pucapampella are actually known due to the differences between specimens.

== Paleobiology ==
Researchers Alexander Kuznetsov and Nadezhda Kryukova have suggested the genus fed by using a "backwards-ripping" motion, where backwards movement of the body was used to pull chunks of flesh from prey. This behavior is in contrast to most living sharks which tear off chunks of flesh with side-to-side motions of the head, but is similar to the feeding method of living Sharpnose sevengill sharks. This behavior would be allowed by the musculature of Pucapampella's head.

== Paleoecology ==
During the Emsian stage, Bolivia and Peru were part of the Malvinokaffric Realm; a region which existed during the Late Silurian and Early Devonian, is characterized by a unique fauna, was made up of portions present-day Antarctica, South America, and Africa, and which sat near the South Pole. In contrast to other regions at that time placoderms were largely absent, with the exception of Bolivosteus. It is likely that the rocks containing Pucapampella were deposited in anoxic, deep-water environments.

== See also ==
- List of prehistoric cartilaginous fish genera
