= Cryphaeoides =

Scientific classification
- Domain: Eukaryota
- Kingdom: Animalia
- Phylum: Arthropoda
- Class: †Trilobita
- Order: †Phacopida
- Family: †Calmoniidae
- Genus: †Cryphaeoides; Delo, 1935

Genus of trilobites

Cryphaeoides is a genus of trilobites in the order Phacopida, that existed during the lower Devonian in what is now Bolivia. It was described by Delo in 1935, and the type species is Cryphaeoides rostratus, which originally described under the genus Cryphaeus by Kozlowski in 1923. It was described from the Sicasica Formation in Patacamaya.
