= Andinacaste =

Andinacaste Temporal range: Early Devonian ~416.0–412.3 Ma

Scientific classification
- Domain: Eukaryota
- Kingdom: Animalia
- Phylum: Arthropoda
- Class: †Trilobita
- Order: †Phacopida
- Family: †Calmoniidae
- Genus: †Andinacaste; Eldredge & Ormiston 1979

Genus of trilobites

Andinacaste is an extinct genus of trilobites. It contains two species, A. espejensis, and A. legrandi. Fossils have been found in the Catavi Formation of Bolivia.
