= Gamonedaspis =

Scientific classification
- Domain: Eukaryota
- Kingdom: Animalia
- Phylum: Arthropoda
- Class: †Trilobita
- Order: †Phacopida
- Family: †Dalmanitidae
- Genus: †Gamonedaspis; Branisa & Vanek, 1973

Genus of trilobites

Gamonedaspis is a trilobite in the order Phacopida (family Dalmanitidae), that existed during the lower Devonian in what is now Bolivia. It was described by Branisa and Vanek in 1973, and the type species is Gamonedaspis scutata. The type locality was the Belén Formation.
