= Australops =

Scientific classification
- Domain: Eukaryota
- Kingdom: Animalia
- Phylum: Arthropoda
- Class: †Trilobita
- Order: †Phacopida
- Family: †Calmoniidae
- Genus: †Australops; Baldis, 1972

Extinct genus of trilobites

Australops is a genus of trilobites in the order Phacopida, which existed in what is now Argentina. It was described by Baldis in 1972, and the type species is Australops australis.
