= Bessazoon =

Scientific classification
- Domain: Eukaryota
- Kingdom: Animalia
- Phylum: Arthropoda
- Class: †Trilobita
- Order: †Phacopida
- Family: †Dalmanitidae
- Genus: †Bessazoon; Curtis & Lane, 1998
- Species: †B. gibbae

Binomial name
- †Bessazoon gibbae Chatterton & Ludvigsen, 2004

Extinct genus of trilobite

Bessazoon is an extinct genus of trilobite in the family Dalmanitidae. There is one described species in Bessazoon, B. gibbae.
