= Cingulochitina =

Scientific classification
- Domain: Eukaryota
- Kingdom: incertae sedis
- Class: †Chitinozoa
- Order: †Operculatifera
- Family: †Desmochitinidae
- Genus: †Cingulochitina; Paris, 1981

Extinct genus of chitinozoans

Cingulochitina is an extinct genus of chitinozoans. It was described by Paris in 1981.

== Species ==
- Cingulochitina baltica Nestor, 1994
- Cingulochitina bouniensis Verniers, 1999
- Cingulochitina cingulata (Eisenack, 1937)
- Cingulochitina convexa (Laufeld, 1974)
- Cingulochitina crassa Nestor, 1994
- Cingulochitina gorstyensis Sutherland, 1974
