= Fenestraspis =

Fenestraspis Temporal range: Pragian–Emsian

Scientific classification
- Kingdom: Animalia
- Phylum: Arthropoda
- Clade: †Artiopoda
- Class: †Trilobita
- Order: †Phacopida
- Family: †Dalmanitidae
- Genus: †Fenestraspis; Braniša & Vanek, 1973

Genus of trilobites

Fenestraspis is an extinct genus of trilobite in the order Phacopida from the Upper Pragian and Lower Emsian. Fenestraspis is unusual because of the development of extensive fenestrae in the posterior part of the body and apparently of the thorax, the presence of upwardly directed spines on the cephalon, thorax and pygidium, and the exceptionally large and highly elevated eyes.

== Distribution ==
F. amauta is only known from the Lower and Middle Devonian of Bolivia (upper quarter of the Lower Belen Formation, which approximately coincides with the transition from the Pragian to the Emsian, near Chacoma-Cahuanota and Patacamaya).
