= Catavi, La Paz =

Coordinates: 16.4947°S 68.585°W

Catavi Q'atawi
- Town
- Interactive map of Catavi
- Country: Bolivia
- Department: La Paz Department
- Province: Los Andes Province
- Municipality: Pucarani Municipality
- Time zone: UTC-4 (BOT)

Catavi (from Aymara Q'atawi, meaning "lime") is a small town in Bolivia. In 2009 it had an estimated population of 814.
