= Francovichia =

Scientific classification
- Domain: Eukaryota
- Kingdom: Animalia
- Phylum: Arthropoda
- Class: †Trilobita
- Order: †Phacopida
- Family: †Dalmanitidae
- Genus: †Francovichia; Branisa & Vanek, 1973

Genus of trilobites

Francovichia is a trilobite in the order Phacopida (family Dalmanitidae), that existed during the lower Devonian in what is now Bolivia. It was described by Branisa and Vanek in 1973, and the type species is Francovichia branisi, which was originally described under the genus Odontochile by Wolfart in 1968. It also contains the species, F. clarkei. The type locality was the Belén Formation.
