= Tarijactinoides =

Tarijactinoides Temporal range: Devonian ~409–392 Ma

Scientific classification
- Domain: Eukaryota
- Kingdom: Animalia
- Phylum: Arthropoda
- Class: †Trilobita
- Order: †Phacopida
- Family: †Calmoniidae
- Genus: †Tarijactinoides; Suarez Soruco, 1971

Species
- Tarijactinoides jarcasensis Tarijactinoides tikanensis

Extinct genus of trilobites

Tarijactinoides is a genus of trilobites in the order Phacopida, which existed in what is now Bolivia. It was described by Suárez Soruco in 1971, and the type species is Tarijactinoides jarcasensis.

== Distribution ==
Fossils of two species of Tarijactinoides, T. jarcasensis and T. tikanensis, have been found in Emsian sediments of the Lower Belén, Lower Icla and Gamoneda Formations in Bolivia. A new species in the same genus was proposed by Morzadec et al. in 2015, found in the lower part of the Floresta Formation, Floresta, Boyacá. This formation of the Altiplano Cundiboyacense in the Eastern Ranges of the Colombian Andes has provided several other trilobites.
