= Deltacephalaspis =

Deltacephalaspis Temporal range: Emsian ~409–392 Ma

Scientific classification
- Domain: Eukaryota
- Kingdom: Animalia
- Phylum: Arthropoda
- Class: †Trilobita
- Order: †Phacopida
- Family: †Calmoniidae
- Genus: †Deltacephalaspis; Eldredge and Ormiston, 1979

Extinct genus of trilobites of the Devonian

Deltacephalaspis is an extinct genus of trilobites in the order Phacopida. It contains four species, D. comis, D. magister, D. retrospina, and D. tumida. Fossils of the genus have been found in the Belén, Icla and Gamoneda Formations of Bolivia and the Gydo Formation of South Africa.
