= Kazachstania (trilobite) =

Kazachstania Temporal range: Devonian

Scientific classification
- Domain: Eukaryota
- Kingdom: Animalia
- Phylum: Arthropoda
- Class: †Trilobita
- Order: †Phacopida
- Family: †Dalmanitidae
- Genus: †Kazachstania; Maksimova, 1972

Kazachstania is an extinct genus of Devonian-aged trilobites in the order Phacopida. It contains one species, K. gerardoi and has been found in Bolivia and Kazakhstan.
