= Metacryphaeus =

Metacryphaeus Temporal range: Middle Devonian, 391.9–383.7 Ma Eifelian - Givetian
- Metacryphaeus caffer

Scientific classification
- Domain: Eukaryota
- Kingdom: Animalia
- Phylum: Arthropoda
- Class: †Trilobita
- Order: †Phacopida
- Family: †Calmoniidae
- Genus: †Metacryphaeus; Reed, 1907

Metacryphaeus is an extinct genus of trilobites from the family Calmoniidae. Metacryphaeus fossils have been found in Bolivia, Brazil, South Africa and Uruguay. The genus was named in 1907.
