= Bainella =

Bainella Temporal range: Devonian ~391.9–388.1 Ma

Scientific classification
- Kingdom: Animalia
- Phylum: Arthropoda
- Clade: †Artiopoda
- Class: †Trilobita
- Order: †Phacopida
- Family: †Calmoniidae
- Genus: †Bainella; Rennie, 1930

Species
- Bainella africana; Bainella baini; Bainella cristagalli

Synonyms
- Paranacaste Popp 1989

Genus of trilobites

Bainella is an extinct genus of Devonian trilobites from off the coast of Gondwana. Fossils were found in the Ponta Grossa Formation of Brazil, Belén, Icla and Gamoneda Formations of Bolivia and the Gydo, Gamka and Voorstehoek Formations of South Africa. It contains three species: B. africana, B. baini, and B. cristagalli.
