= USS Francovich (APD-116) =

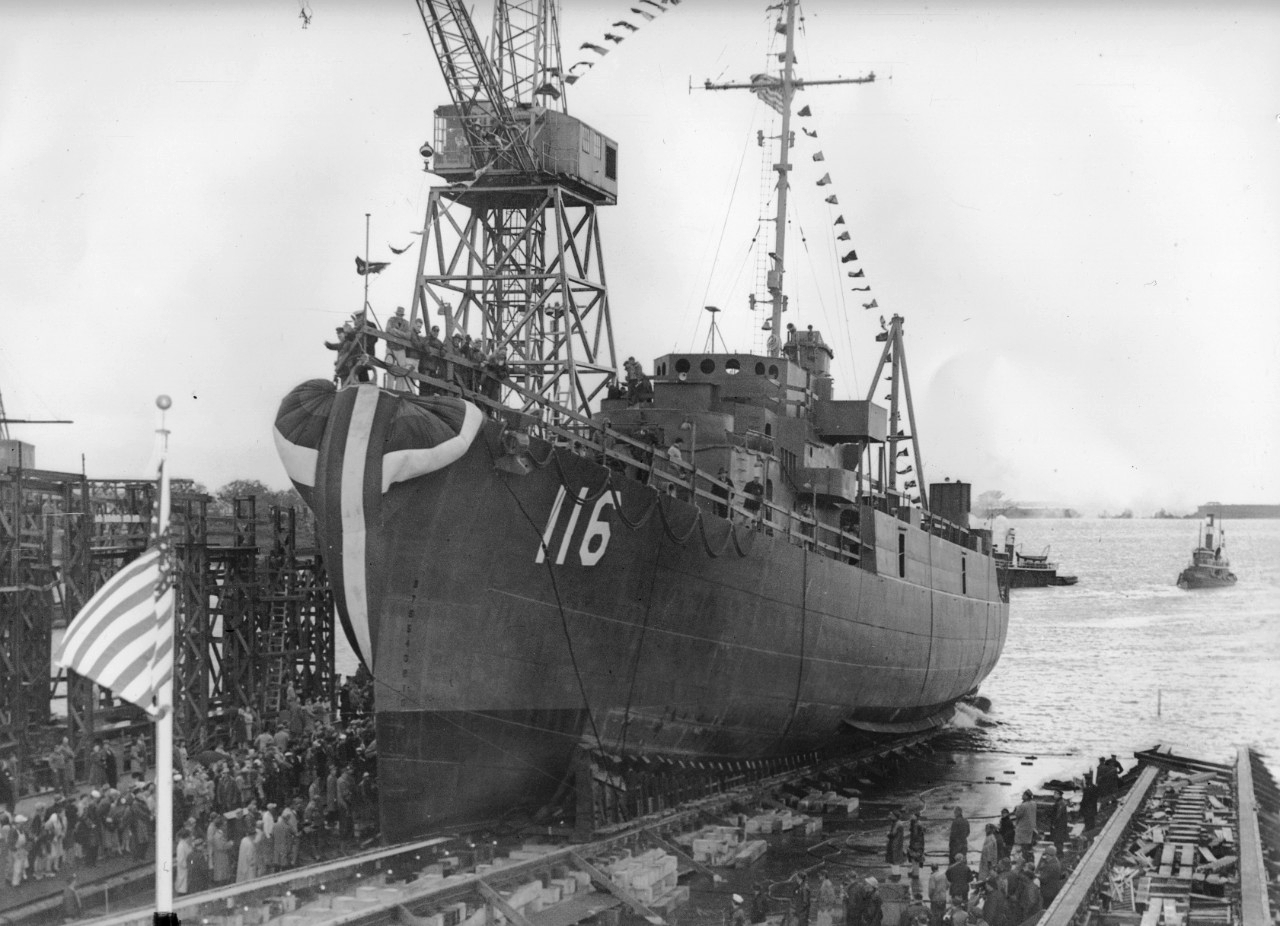

History

United States
- Namesake: Aviation Machinist's Mate First Class Albert A. Francovich (1920–1942), United States Navy sailor and Navy Cross recipient
- Builder: Bethlehem-Hingham Shipyard, Hingham, Massachusetts
- Laid down: 19 April 1945
- Launched: 5 June 1945
- Sponsored by: Mrs. Mary F. Edmunds
- Commissioned: 6 September 1945
- Decommissioned: 29 April 1946
- Reclassified: From destroyer escort DE-606 to fast transport APD-116 17 July 1945
- Stricken: 1 April 1964
- Fate: Sold for scrapping May 1965

General characteristics
- Class & type: Crosley-class high speed transport
- Displacement: 1,400 tons
- Length: 306 ft (93 m)
- Beam: 37 ft (11 m)
- Draft: 12 ft 7 in (4 m)
- Propulsion: 2 × Babcox and Wilcox DR boilers; 2 × GE Turbines, (turbo-electric drive); 2 shafts 12,000 shp (8,900 kW))
- Speed: 23.6 knots (43.7 km/h; 27.2 mph)
- Range: 6,000 nmi (11,000 km; 6,900 mi) at 12 knots (22 km/h; 14 mph)
- Boats & landing craft carried: 4 LCVPs
- Troops: 12 officers; 150 enlisted
- Complement: 12-15 officers; 189-192 enlisted
- Armament: 1 × 5"/38 dual purpose gun mount; 3 × twin 40 mm gun mounts; 6 × single 20 mm gun mounts; 2 × depth charge tracks

USS Francovich (APD-116) was a United States Navy Crosley-class high speed transport in commission from 1945 to 1946. It was sold for scrap in 1965.

== Namesake ==
Albert Anthony Francovich was born on 23 January 1920, at Shamokin, Pennsylvania into a Croatian-American family. He enlisted in the U.S. Navy on 8 March 1939. As an aviation machinist's mate first class with a patrol squadron during the Solomon Islands campaign, Francovich was killed in action in an engagement with a Japanese four-engined flying boat on 6 September 1942. Francovich posthumously was awarded the Navy Cross for his heroism in standing to his gun although mortally wounded.

The U.S. Navy destroyer escort USS Francovich was named for him but when the destroyer escort's construction was cancelled in 1944 prior to completion, the name was transferred to the Rudderow-class destroyer escort USS Francovich (DE-606).

== Construction and commissioning ==
USS Francovich (DE-606) was laid down on 19 April 1945 by Bethlehem-Hingham Shipyard at Hingham, Massachusetts. She was launched on 5 June 1945, sponsored by Mrs. Mary F. Edmunds, Francovich's sister. Francovich was re-classified as a Crosley-class high speed transport and redesignated APD-116 on 17 July 1945. She was commissioned on 6 September 1945.

== Service history ==
After her shakedown training, Francovich, commissioned too late to see service during World War II, arrived at Green Cove Springs, Florida, on 18 November 1945 to give assistance in the post-World War II inactivation of ships being readied for reserve there.

== Decommissioning and disposal ==
Francovich was decommissioned on 29 April 1946 and herself placed in reserve at Green Cove Springs. She was stricken from the Naval Vessel Register on 1 April 1964 and sold for scrapping in May 1965.
