= Kozlowskiaspis =

Scientific classification
- Domain: Eukaryota
- Kingdom: Animalia
- Phylum: Arthropoda
- Class: †Trilobita
- Order: †Phacopida
- Family: †Calmoniidae
- Genus: †Kozlowskiaspis; Branisa & Vanek, 1973

Genus of trilobites

Kozlowskiaspis is a genus of trilobites in the order Phacopida (family Calmoniidae), that existed during the lower Devonian in what is now Bolivia. It was described by Branisa and Vanek in 1973, and the type species is Kozlowskiapsis superna. It also contains the species K. australis and K. borealis. The type locality was the Icla Formation.
