= Chonetidina =

Scientific classification
- Domain: Eukaryota
- Kingdom: Animalia
- Phylum: Brachiopoda
- Class: †Strophomenata
- Order: †Productida
- Suborder: †Chonetidina

Suborder of marine lamp shells

A suborder of brachiopods containing the families:

- Family Strophochonetidae
- Family Chonostrophiidae
- Family Anopliidae
- Family Eodevonariidae
- Family Chonetidae
- Family Rugosochonetidae
- Family Daviesiellidae
