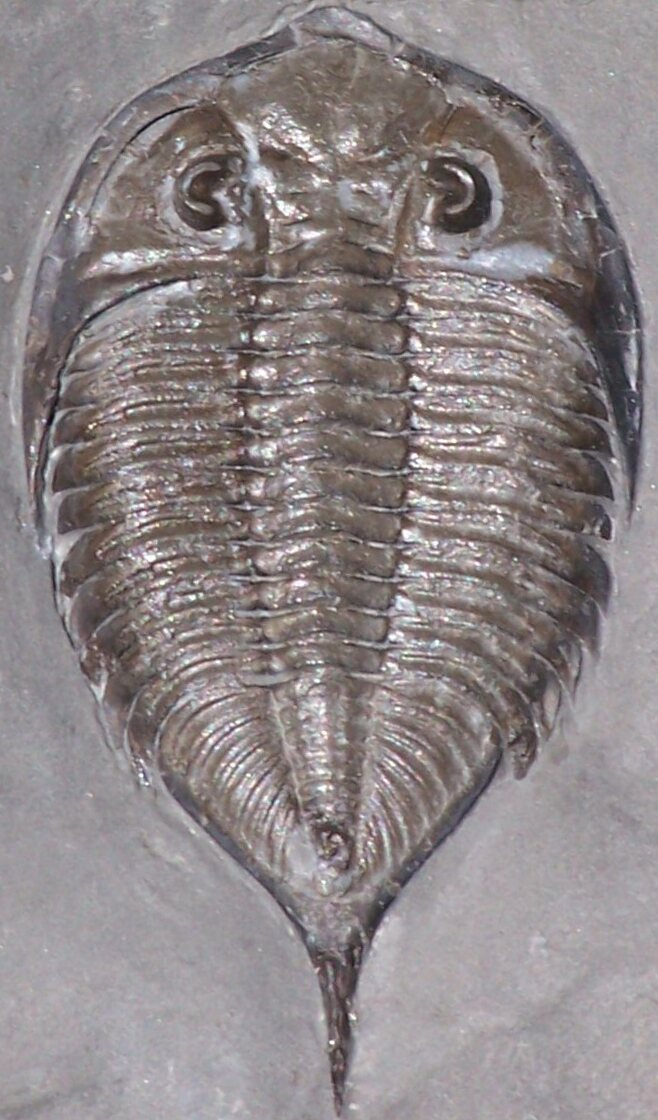
- Specimen of Dalmanites limulurus

Scientific classification
- Kingdom: Animalia
- Phylum: Arthropoda
- Clade: †Artiopoda
- Class: †Trilobita
- Order: †Phacopida
- Family: †Dalmanitidae
- Genus: †Dalmanites; Barrande, 1852

Species
- D. caudatus (Bruennich, 1781) (type) = Trilobus caudatus; D. corrugatus (Reed, 1901); D. halli (Weller, 1907); D. limulurus (Green, 1832); D. myops (Koenig, 1825); D. nexilus Salter, 1864; D. obtusus (Lindstroem, 1885); D. platycaudatus Weller, 1907; D. rutellum Campbell, 1967; D. socialis Barrande

= Dalmanites =

Dalmanites Temporal range: Late Ordovician–Middle Devonian, 449.5–376.1 Ma

Extinct genus of trilobites

Dalmanites is a genus of trilobite in the order Phacopida. They lived from the Late Ordovician to Middle Devonian. It was named for the Swedish naturalist Johan Wilhelm Dalman.

The trilobites of this genus have slightly convex exoskeletons with an average length of 4–7 cm (1.5–3 in). The cephalon is semicircular or parabolic. The glabella (center portion of the head) is often pear-shaped, and tapers outward toward the front. The glabella also always contains three pairs of obvious glabellar furrows. Also prominent are the large mosaic (schizochroal) eyes.

The thorax is composed of eleven segments, with the relatively large pygidium with a slender axis of 11 to 16 rings and 6 or 7 pleural ribs. The pygidium ends in a striking tail spike.

== Taxonomy ==
=== Species previously assigned to Dalmanites ===
Some species formerly included in Dalmanites have now been reassigned to other genera.

- D. lapeyrei = Zeliszkella torrubiae
- D. maecurua = Amazonaspis maecurua
- D. micheli = Phacopidina micheli
- D. pleione = Bellacartwrightia pleione
- D. torrubiae = Zeliszkella torrubiae
- D. weaveri var. tenuimucronata = Bessazoon tenuimucronata

== Description ==
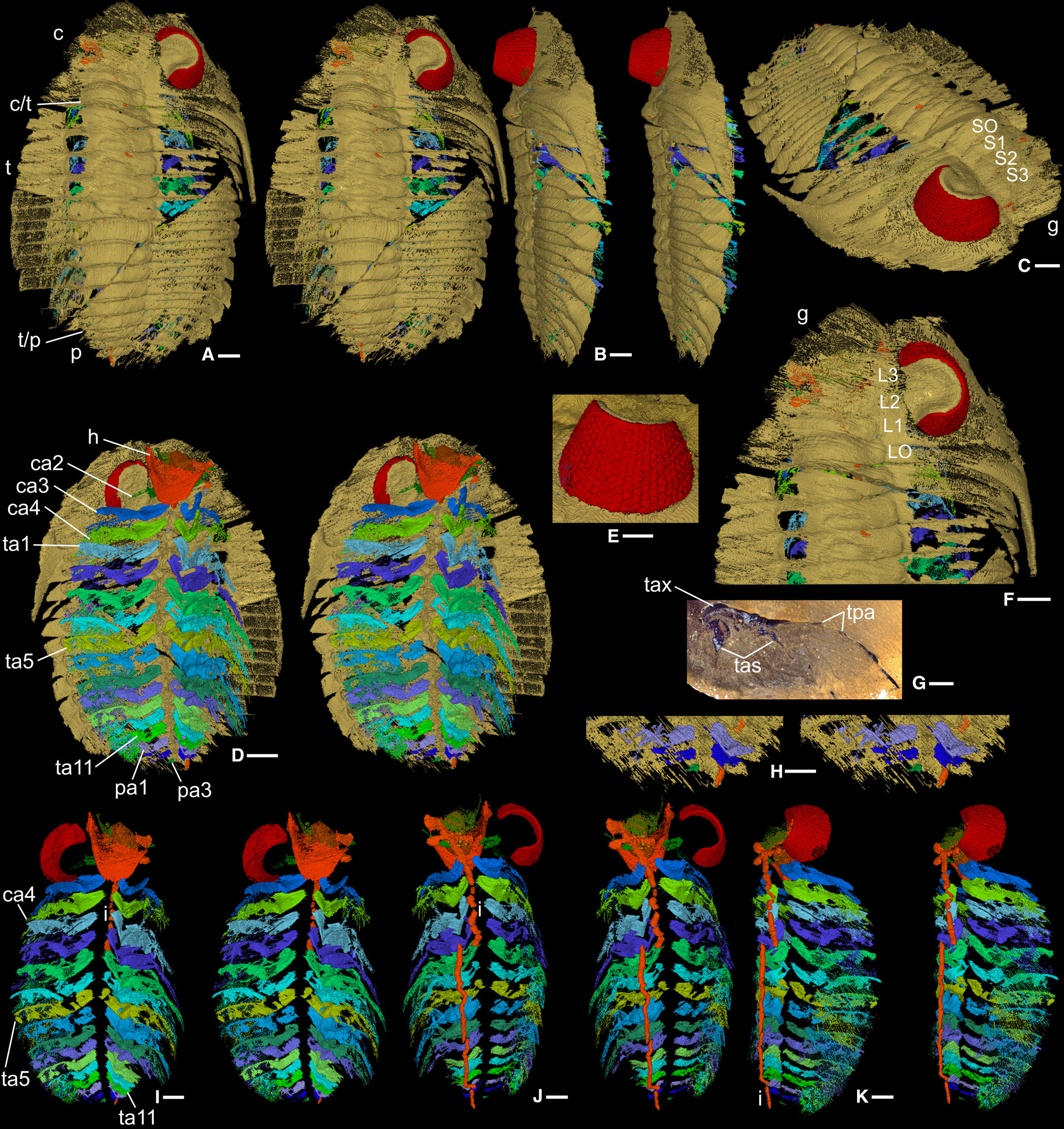
Specimen with preserved limbs

Dalmanites is genus of trilobites with an average (about 8 centimetres or 3.1 inches long), moderately vaulted exoskeleton with an inverted egg-shaped outline (about 1.5× longer than wide). Its headshield (or cephalon) is semicircular, with robust (genal) spines extending from the side of the cephalon back to approximately the 8th thorax segment. The frontal margin of the cephalon is semicircular to parabolic, and it may have a simple and short anterior extension. The facial suture lies inside or touches the preglabellar furrow. The frontal lobe of the central raised area of the cephalon (or glabella) is much wider than the other lobes. The frontal lobe is vaulted. The eye is moderate to large, about half as long as the cheek. The "seem" that is visible from the ventral side (or doublure) is wide and flat, and has a deep and wide antennal furrow. The "palate" (or hypostome), also only visible from the ventral side, is subtriangular (about as long as wide) and adorned with three weak denticles at its back rim. To the front the hypostome has weak wings extending sideways. The thorax consists of 11 segments. The tips of the segments are pointed and angle back increasingly from about 30° for the anterior segment to slightly pointing inwards for the posterior segment. The tailshield (or pygidium) is large, subtriangular, and about two-thirds to three-fourths as long as wide. The axis is vaulted and ±35% of the width of the pygidium and consists of 12-15 rings. 9–10 deep and wide pleural furrows have flat or only slightly concave bottoms. The furrows within each pleural rib (or interpleural furrows) are very narrow. The frontal band of each pleural rib is more vaulted and broader than the rear band. The pleural furrows almost reach the margin. The pygidial termination (or mucro) is vaulted and more or less pointed into a spine, which may differ between species. The entire exoskeleton is covered in fine and coarse granules. A specimen of an indeterminate species with preserved soft tissue is known from the Silurian aged Coalbrookdale Formation of England. The antennae are not preserved, though biramous limb pairs are preserved, three are present on the cephalon, 11 on the thorax and at least 3 on the pygidium. The thoracic pairs become smaller posteriorly. The exopods of the limbs bear filamentous structures, which appear to be joined with each other by a membrane.
