= Calmoniidae =

Calmoniidae Temporal range: 428.2–383.7 Ma Silurian - Devonian
- Metacryphaeus caffer fossil

Scientific classification
- Kingdom: Animalia
- Phylum: Arthropoda
- Clade: †Artiopoda
- Class: †Trilobita
- Order: †Phacopida
- Suborder: †Phacopina
- Superfamily: †Acastoidea
- Family: †Calmoniidae; Delo, 1935

Family of trilobites

Calmoniidae is a family of trilobites from the order Phacopida, suborder Phacopina, superfamily Acastoidea.

It contains the following genera:

- Anchiopella
- Andinacaste
- Australocaste
- Australops
- Awaria
- Bainella
- Belenops
- Bouleia
- Calmonia
- Chiarumanipyge
- Clarkeaspis
- Cryphaeoides
- Curuyella
- Deltacephalaspis
- Eldredgeia
- Feistia
- Hadrorachus
- Jujuyops
- Kozlowskiaspis
- Malvinella
- Malvinocooperella
- Metacryphaeus
- Oosthuizenella
- Palpebrops
- Parabouleia
- Paracalmonia
- Pennaia
- Plesioconvexa
- Plesiomalvinella
- Prestalia
- Probolops
- Punillaspis
- Renniella
- Romanops
- Schizostylus
- Talacastops
- Tarijactinoides
- Tibagya
- Tormesiscus
- Typhloniscus
- Vogesina
- Wolfartaspis

== See also ==
- Malvinella buddeae
