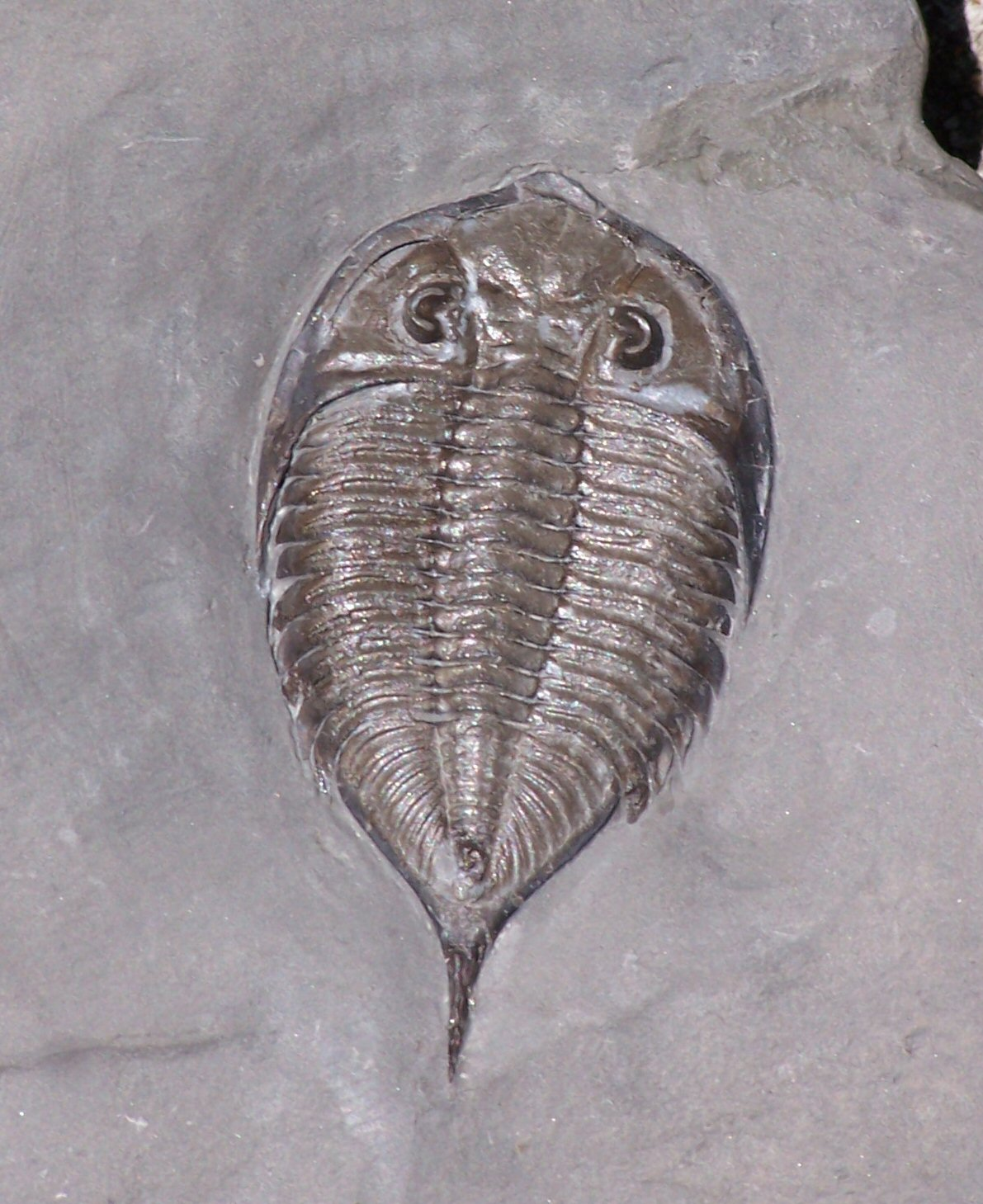
- Dalmanites limulurus

Scientific classification
- Kingdom: Animalia
- Phylum: Arthropoda
- Clade: †Artiopoda
- Class: †Trilobita
- Order: †Phacopida
- Suborder: †Phacopina
- Superfamily: †Dalmanitoidea
- Family: †Dalmanitidae; Vogdes, 1890

Genera
- Anchiopsis; Andreaspis; Argentopyge; Bessazoon; Blanodalmanites; Chattiaspis; Coronura; Corycephalus; Crozonaspis; Dalmanites; Dalmanitina; Dalmaniturus; Daytonia; Delops; Dreyfussina; Duftonia; Eodalmanitina; Fenestraspis; Forillonaria; Francovichia; Furacopyge; Gamonedaspis; Glyptambon; Huntoniatonia; Kazachstania; Lygdozoon; Malladaia; Morgatia; Mucronaspis; Neoprobolium; Odontocephalus; Odontochile; Ormathops; Phalangocephalus; Preodontochile; Prodontochile; Roncellia; Schoharia; Synphoria; Synphoroides; Toletanaspis; Trypaulites; Waukeshaaspis

= Dalmanitidae =

Dalmanitidae Temporal range: Floian–Devonian

Extinct family of trilobites

Dalmanitidae is a family of trilobites in the order Phacopida that lived from the Floian (Ordovician) to the Devonian and includes 33 genera.
