= List of fossiliferous stratigraphic units in Australia =

The list of fossiliferous stratigraphic units in Australia is a documented list of Australian geological units. This includes both standalone formations and geologic groups.

== Unit statistics ==
- Precambrian: 7 (13.5%)
- Cambrian: 1 (1.9%)
- Ordovician: 1 (1.9%)
- Silurian: 1 (1.9%)
- Devonian: 9 (17.3%)
- Carboniferous: 2 (3.8%)
- Permian: 3 (5.8%)
- Triassic: 8 (15.4%)
- Jurassic: 5 (9.6%)
- Cretaceous: 15 (28.8%)
- Total: 52

== List ==
=== Precambrian ===
Precambrian fossiliferous stratigraphic units of Australia
Unit	Age	Location	Notable finds	Image
Bitter Springs Group	Tonian	Northern Territory	Preserves microorganisms and stromatolites in silica.	
Dresser Formation	Paleoarchean	Western Australia	Contains an abundance of well-preserved evidence for the existence of microbial life during the Paleoarchean	
Limbunya Group	Statherian	Northern Territory	Preserves a variety of tubular forms and acritarchs.	Line drawing reconstruction of Tortunema hermanii
Rawnsley Quartzite	Ediacaran	South Australia	The beds within this formation preserve the remains some of Australia's oldest multicelluar organisms, such as Dickinsonia costata and D. tenuis, and Kimberella quadrata.	Fossil of D. costata.
Trezona Formation	Cryogenian Ediacaran	South Australia	Beds are composed of stromatolites and other cyanobacteria, as well as 3D fossils. Also records the "Trezona Anomaly", the noticeable rise of δ^{13}C.	
Tumbiana Formation	Neoarchean	Western Australia	Possesses numerous microfossils and stromatolites such as Alcheringa narrina.	
Turee Creek Group	Siderian	Western Australia	Contains the Kazput Reef Complex, which preserves many stromtolites and thrombolites. Possibly the oldest known microfossil community known to science.	

=== Cambrian ===
Cambrian fossiliferous stratigraphic units of Australia
Unit	Age	Location	Notable finds	Image
Emu Bay Shale	Cambrian Series 2	South Australia	The only Cambrian Lagerstätte in Australia, which excellently preserves a varied assemblage, including the predatory Anomalocaris daleyae and the giant trilobite Redlichia rex.	Frontal appendage of A. daleyae.

=== Ordovician ===
Ordovician fossiliferous stratigraphic units of Australia
Unit	Age	Location	Notable finds	Image
Chudleigh Subgroup	Mid–Late Ordovician	Tasmania	Harbours a diverse range of brachiopod, bryozoans, corals, gastropods, nautiloids, stromatoporoids.	

=== Silurian ===
Silurian fossiliferous stratigraphic units of Australia
Unit	Age	Location	Notable finds	Image
Melbourne Formation	Ludlow	Victoria	The now dubious eurypterid Pterygotus australis and the trilobite Encrinurus simpliciculus	

=== Devonian ===
Devonian fossiliferous stratigraphic units of Australia
Unit	Age	Location	Notable finds	Image
Bindaree Formation	Middle Devonian	Victoria	Includes a fossil locality at the base of Mount Howitt, preserving species such as the canowindrid Beelarongia patrichae and the coelacanth Gavinia syntrips.	G. syntrips skull diagram.
Broken River Group	Early–Late Devonian	Queensland	Hosts endemic placoderm genera, including Atlantidosteus pacifica.	
Buchan Group	Early Devonian	Victoria	A diverse placoderm assemblage, of which some genera and even species are shared with the Murrumbidgee Group, such as Buchanosteus confertituberculatus.	B. confertituberculatus reconstruction.
Dulcie Sandstone	Mid–Late Devonian	Northern Territory	Fauna is similar to the Cravens Peak Beds, but also hosts the endemic phyllolepid Austrophyllolepis dulciensis.	Reconstruction of the Victorian species A. ritchei.
Cravens Peak Beds	Early–Mid Devonian	Queensland	An placoderm-heavy fauna known as the Wuttagoonaspis fauna. Also includes the agnathans Neeyambaspis enigmatica and Pituriaspis doylei, as well as the mysterious Palaeospondylus australis.	Restoration of the related W. fletcheri.
Gogo Formation	Mid–Late Devonian	Western Australia	A Lagerstätte which features excellent preservation of various fishes, including the ptyctodontid Materpiscis attenboroughi, which was preserved with an unborn embryo, a definitive sign of viviparity.	Reconstruction of M. attenboroughi.
Mandagery Sandstone	Late Devonian	New South Wales	A Lagerstätte unit where slab discovered in 1955 in the town of Canowindra preserves 114 fish individuals, mostly Bothriolepis yeungae and Remigolepis walkeri, as well as a single Canowindra grossi and two Groenlandaspis juveniles.	Cast of the slab found in 1955.
Murrumbidgee Group	Early Devonian	New South Wales	Recordes various chondrichthyans such as Taemasacanthus spp., a diverse assemblage of placoderms including the unique Brindabellaspis stensioi, and the weejasperaspid Weejasperaspis gavini.	A reconstruction of B. stensioi.
Virgin Hills Formation	Late Devonian	Western Australia	One of the most species rich invertebrate formations in Australia, preserving dozens of ammonoid, conodont and trilobite species across different clades. Also includes various chondrichthyans and the placoderm Westralichthys uwagedensis.	Reconstruction of W. uwagedensis.

=== Carboniferous ===
Carboniferous fossiliferous stratigraphic units of Australia
Unit	Age	Location	Notable finds	Image
Ducabrook Formation	Mississippian (Viséan)	Queensland	Hosts a small biota, including the stegocephalian Ossinodus pueri and the xenacanthiform Reginaselache morrisi.	Reconstruction of O pueri.
Snowy Plains Formation	Mississippian (Tournasian)	Victoria	Hosts a dozen body fossil genera, including the chondrichthyans Acanthodes australis and Gyracanthides murrayi, the sarcopterygians Barameda decipiens and B. mitchelli, as well as various ichnotaxa.	Reconstruction of B. decipiens.

=== Permian ===
Permian fossiliferous stratigraphic units of Australia
Unit	Age	Location	Notable finds	Image
Cundlego Formation	Cisuralian	Western Australia	Numerous slabs composed of Jimbacrinus bostocki, in densities of 150 or more individuals per square metre, which were preserved via a storm event that swept them out to sea, and were rapidly buried in sediment.	Fossil slab of J. bostocki.
Croudace Bay Formation	Lopingian	New South Wales	Hosts the Belmont insect bed within the Belmont Conglomerate Member, which has led to the discovery of numerous species.	Tegmen of Pincombea mirabilis
Reids Mistake Formation	Lopingian	New South Wales	Features remnants of Glossopteris.	

=== Triassic ===
Triassic fossiliferous stratigraphic units of Australia
Unit	Age	Location	Notable finds	Image
Arcadia Formation (Australia)	Mid–Late Triassic	Queensland	Possesses only known dicynodont remains from Australia, Eomurruna yurrgensis, one of Australia's most complete Mesozoic animals, and various temnospondyls	Holotype of Eomurruna yurrgensis.
Ashfield Shale	Middle Triassic	New South Wales	Records a diverse, well-preserved biota, including the temnospondyls Microposaurus, Notobrachyops, and Paracyclotosaurus.	Reconstruction of P. davidi.
Blackstone Formation, Australia	Late Triassic	Queensland	This formation contains the Denmark Hill Insect Bed, located within the Denmark Hill Conservation Park.	
Blina Shale	Early Triassic	Western Australia	Hosts fishes and temnospondyls, such as the long-snouted Aphaneramma.	Restoration of A. sp.
Bulgo Sandstone	Early Triassic	New South Wales	The largest known temnospondyl from the Sydney Basin, Bulgosuchus gargantua, is described from here.	Paleoenvironmetal reconstruction, including Dicroidium tree (top right), Pleuromeia (centre foreground) Bulgosuchus (right foreground) and a proterosuchid (right background).
Knocklofty Formation	Early Triassic	Tasmania	Best known for the discovery of Tasmaniosaurus triassicus, which possesses features once used to define Archosauria and Archosauriformes.	Tasmaniosaurus skeletal reconstruction.
Sydney Sandstone (Paleobiota of the Sydney Sandstone)	Middle Triassic	New South Wales	Also known as the Hawkesbury Sandstone, this formation's rocks are a popular building material, and also hosts a variety of fossil taxa, including fishes, the temnospondyl Subcyclotosaurus brookvalensis, insects, the xiphosuran Austrolimulus fletcheri, bivalves, various plant species and others.	Restored skull of S. brookvalensis.
Terrigal Formation	Early–Middle Triassic	New South Wales	This formation gained notability with the discovery of the chigutisaurid Arenaerpeton supinatus in 2023, when it was found in a slab purchased back in 1996 by the retired chicken farmer Mihail Mihaildis	Arenaerpeton supinatus (AM F125866) skull and partial skeleton.

=== Jurassic ===
Jurassic fossiliferous stratigraphic units of Australia
Unit	Age	Location	Notable finds	Image
Colalura Sandstone	Middle Jurassic	Western Australia	The abelisauroid Ozraptor subotaii is described from this formation.	Ozraptor size with distal end of tibia annotated.
Evergreen Formation	Late Jurassic	New South Wales; Queensland	Most of its diversity is ichnotaxa and plant fossils, but its most notable find is Siderops kehli, a Jurassic temnospondyl.	Restoration of Siderops kehli
Purlawaugh Formation	Early–Late Jurassic	New South Wales	Contains the Talbragar Fossil Fish Bed, which contains numerous species of fish, invertebrates, and plants.	Reconstruction of the archaeomaenids Madariscus robustus (top) and Archaeomaene tenuis (bottom).
Newmarracarra Limestone	Middle Jurassic	Western Australia	A diverse invertebrate fauna is known, including ammonites, bivalves, brachiopods, belemnitids, foraminiferans, gastropods and ostracods, among others.	
Walloon Coal Measures	Late Jurassic	Queensland	Notable for the discovery of Rhoetosaurus brownei, the only described pre-Cretaceous dinosaur from Australia.	Rhoetosaurus size comparison.

=== Cretaceous ===
Cretaceous fossiliferous stratigraphic units of Australia
Unit	Age	Location	Notable finds	Image
Allaru Formation	Early Cretaceous	Queensland	Known for the discovery of the sauropod Austrosaurus mckillopi, and Australia's most complete dinosaur, Kunbarrasaurus ieversi.	Reconstruction of A. mckillopi.
Birdrong Sandstone	Early Cretaceous	Western Australia	Indeterminate theropod remains, and the plesiosaur Leptocleidus clemai.	
Broome Sandstone	Early Cretaceous	Queensland	Reputed for its fossilized trackways, including those of sauropods and the stegosaur ichnogenus Garbina roeorum.	Part of a sauropod trackway in the Broome Sandstone.
Bulldog Shale	Early Cretaceous	South Australia	Known from several reptiles including Kakuru kujani, and Umoonasaurus, including the complete skeleton of 'Eric'.	U. demoscyllus reconstruction.
Bungil Formation	Early Cretaceous	Queensland	Type location of Minmi paravertebra.	Reconstruction of M. paravertebra, based on Kunbarrasaurus.
Eumeralla Formation	Early Cretaceous	Victoria	Possesses the elasmarians Atlascopcosaurus loadsi, Diluvicursor pickeringi, cf. Galleonosaurus dorisae Leaellynasaura amicagraphica, and the possible tyrannosauroid Timimus hermani. The Koonwarra fossil bed is sometimes considered to be part of the formation. Shares faunal similarities with the nearby, older Wonthaggi Formation.	Life restoration of D. pickeringi.
Griman Creek Formation	Early–Late Cretaceous	New South Wales	Includes the ornithischians Fostoria dhimbangunmal, Fulgurotherium australe, Weewarraaurus pobeni; the theropods Rapator ornitholestoides, Walgettosuchus woodwardi, and the indeterminate large theropod "Lightning Claw".	W. pobeni facial reconstruction.
Koonwarra Fossil Bed	Early Cretaceous	Victoria	A Lagerstätte fossil site known for its abundant remains of fishes, invertebrates and plants.	Reconstruction of Wadeichthys oxyops (top) and Koonwarria manifrons (bottom).
Mackunda Formation	Early Cretaceous	Queensland	One of Australia's most famous dinosaurs, Muttaburrasaurus langdoni, was originally described in the Mackunda Formation.	Skeleton of Muttaburrasaurus.
Molecap Greensand	Late Cretaceous	Western Australia	Indeterminate theropod, pterosaur remains, and cf. Platecarpus sp.	
Miria Formation	Late Cretaceous	Western Australia	Possible indeterminate theropod, sea turtle and azhdarchid pterosaur remains.	
Toolebuc Formation	Early Cretaceous	Northern Territory; Queensland; South Australia	Boasts a diverse Cretaceous marine fauna, such as protostegid turtles, the pliosaurid Kronosaurus queenslandicus, the plesiosaur Eromangasaurus australis, the ichthyosaur "Platypterygius" australis, and pterosaurs including Haliskia peterseni, Australia's most complete pterosaur.	Reconstruction of K. queenslandicus.
Wallumbilla Formation	Early Cretaceous	New South Wales; Northern Territory; Queensland; South Australia	Alongside various marine reptiles only named at genus level or at an indeterminate family level, this formation additionally preserves ammonites, bivalves, the sea snail Notopala albascopularis, dozens of foraminiferan, radiolarian, dinoflagellete, and acritarch species, alongside other invertebrates as well as spores and pollens.	
Winton Formation	Early–Late Cretaceous	Queensland	Australia's most famous dinosaur-bearing formation, the Winton Formation hosts the theropod Australovenator wintonensis, the sauropods Australotitan cooperensis, Diamantinasaurus matildae, Savannasaurus elliottorum, and Wintonotitan wattsi. Also known is the pterosaur Ferrodraco lentoni, the crocodylomorphs Confractosuchus sauroktonos, and Isisfordia duncani, as well as various ichnotaxa from Snake Creek Tracksite and Lark Quarry Dinosaur Trackways.	Partial skeleton of Australovenator.
Wonthaggi Formation	Early Cretaceous	Victoria	Possesses the elasmarians cfAtlascopcosaurus loadsi, Galleonosaurus dorisae Qantassaurus, the dubious ornithischian Serendipaceratops, the youngest known chigutisaurid Koolasuchus cleelandi, and coelacanths, mammals, turtles, and various indeterminate dinosaurs. Shares faunal similarities with the nearby, younger Eumeralla Formation.	Life restoration of D. pickeringi.
