= Broken River Group =

Devonian geologic formation in Queensland, Australia

- Stratigraphic range: Early-Late Devonian (Emsian–Frasnian) 410.62–372.15 Ma
- Type: Geological group
- Sub-units: Tank Creek Sandstone, Chinaman Creek Limestone, Dip Creek Limestone, Bracteata Formation, Lomandra Limestone, Papilio Formation, Dosey Limestone, Spanner Limestone, Mytton Formation
- Overlies: Shield Creek Formation

Lithology
- Primary: Limestone
- Other: Sandstone

Location
- Location: >30km southwest of Greenvale, Queensland
- Coordinates: 19.164071°S 144.471493°E
- Region: Queensland
- Country: Australia
- Broken River Group (Australia) Broken River Group (Queensland)

The Broken River Group is a group of geological formations located southwest of Greenvale, Queensland. It dates back to the Emsian to Givetian stages of the Devonian. The group is exposed in two separate areass, one around the Pandanus, Grey and South Chinaman creeks, which consists of the Tank Creek Sandstone, and the Chinaman and Dip Creek Limestones. This area is also where the underlying Shield Creek Formation occurs. To the south of this, within the Broken River Gorge, consists of all other formations in the group. For the purposes of this article, these sections will be referred to as Broken River Group North and South respectively.

Although some placoderm species have been described, the formation has a much wider variety of stromatoporoid corals, conodonts, and trilobites.

The group comprises the following subunits:

- North
  - Tank Creek Sandstone (Emsian)
  - Chinaman Creek Limestone (Emsian-Givetian)
  - Dip Creek Limestone (Emsian-Givetian)
- South
  - Bracteata Formation (Emsian)
  - Lomandra Limestone (Emsian)
  - Papilio Formation (Eifelian)
  - Dosey Limestone (Emsian–Givetian)
    - Spanner Limestone Member (Givetian)
  - Mytton Formation (Givetian–Frasnian)
    - Stanley Limestone Member (Givetian)

== Paleobiota ==
=== Conodonts ===
Conodonts of the Broken River Group
Genus	Species	Formations	Clade	Images
Belodella	B. devonica	Chinaman Creek Limestone, Dip Creek Limestone.	Proconodontida, Belodellidae	
Belodella	B. resima	Chinaman Creek Limestone, Dip Creek Limestone.	Proconodontida, Belodellidae	
Belodella	B. triangularis	Chinaman Creek Limestone, Dip Creek Limestone.	Proconodontida, Belodellidae	
Coelocerodontus	C. reduncus	Chinaman Creek Lst., Dip Creek Lst.	Proconodontida, Belodellidae	
Drepanodus	D. sp. A	Chinaman Creek Lst.	Protopanderodontida, Distacodontidae	
Hibbardella	H. cf. wildungenensis	Chinaman Creek Lst.	Ozarkodinida, Coleodontidae	
Hindeodella	H. cf. priscilla	Chinaman Creek Lst., Dip Creek Lst.	Ozarkodinida, Coleodontidae	
Icriodus	I. eslaensis	Chinaman Creek Lst.	Ozarkodinida, Gnathodontidae	
Lonchodina	L. sp.	Dip Creek Lst.	Ozarkodinida, Coleodontidae	
Neopanderodus	aequabilis	Chinaman Creek Lst., Dip Creek Lst.	Panderodontida, Panderodontidae	
Ozarkodina	denckmanni	Chinaman Creek Lst., Dip Creek Lst.	Ozarkodinida, Spathognathodontidae	
Ozarkodina	cf. kutscheri	Chinaman Creek Lst.	Ozarkodinida, Spathognathodontidae	
Panderodus	P. gracilis	Chinaman Creek Lst., Dip Creek Lst.	Panderodontida, Panderodontidae	Reconstruction of P. unicostatus.
Panderodus	P. recurvatus	Dip Creek Lst.	Panderodontida, Panderodontidae	Reconstruction of P. unicostatus.
Panderodus	P. simplex	Chinaman Creek Lst., Dip Creek Lst.	Panderodontida, Panderodontidae	Reconstruction of P. unicostatus.
Panderodus	P. unicostatus	Chinaman Creek Lst., Dip Creek Lst.	Panderodontida, Panderodontidae	Reconstruction of P. unicostatus.
Panderodus	P. valgus	Chinaman Creek Lst., Dip Creek Lst.	Panderodontida, Panderodontidae	Reconstruction of P. unicostatus.
Polygnathus	P. foveolatus foveolatus	Chinaman Creek Lst., Dip Creek Lst.	Ozarkodinida, Polygnathidae	
Polygnathus	P. serotinus	Chinaman Creek Lst., Dip Creek Lst.	Ozarkodinida, Polygnathidae	
Polygnathus	P. linguiformis	Chinaman Creek Lst.	Ozarkodinida, Polygnathidae	
Polygnathus	P. pseudofoliatus	Chinaman Creek Lst.	Ozarkodinida, Polygnathidae	
Scolopodus	S. devonicus	Chinaman Creek Lst.	Protopanderodontida, Protopanderodontidae	
Spathognathodus	S. brevis	Chinaman Creek Lst.	Ozarkodinida, Spathognathodontidae	
Spathognathodus	S. exiguus	Chinaman Creek Lst., Dip Creek Lst.	Ozarkodinida, Spathognathodontidae	
Spathognathodus	S. optimus	Chinaman Creek Lst., Dip Creek Lst.	Ozarkodinida, Spathognathodontidae	
Spathognathodus	S. palethropei	Chinaman Creek Lst., Dip Creek Lst.	Ozarkodinida, Spathognathodontidae	
Spathognathodus	S. bipennatus	Chinaman Creek Lst.	Ozarkodinida, Spathognathodontidae	
Synprioniodina	S. cf. falx	Chinaman Creek Lst., Dip Creek Lst.	Ozarkodinida, Anchignathodontidae	

=== Placoderms ===
Placoderms of the Broken River Group
Genus	Species	Formations	Clade	Images
Atlantidosteus	A. pacifica	Uncertain (‘Fish Hill’ locality)	Arthrodira, Homostiidae	
Confractamnis	C. johnjelli	Unknown (Equivalent to Bracteata Formation & Lomandra Limestone)	Arthrodira, Eubrachythoraci incertae sedis	
Doseyosteus	D. talenti	Lomandra/Dosey Limestone (‘basal part of limestone’)	Arthrodira, Brachythoraci incertae sedis	
Nawagiaspis	N. wadeae	Dosey Limestone	Antiarchi, Bothriolepidoidei incertae sedis	
Wurungulepis	W. denisoni	Undifferentiated section (Equivalent to Bracteata Formation & Lomandra Limestone)	Antiarchi, Pterichthyodidae	
?Pyctodus	?P. sp.	Papilio Formation	Ptyctodontida Ptyctodontidae	

=== Stromatoporoids ===
Stromatoporoids of the Broken River Group
Genus	Species	Formations	Clade	Images
Actinostroma	A. clathratum	Chinaman Creek Limestone; Dip Creek Limestone	Actinostromatida, Actinostromatidae	
Actinostroma	A. aff. stellulatum	Dip Creek Limestone; Lomandra Limestone	Actinostromatida, Actinostromatidae	
Aculatostroma	A. sp.	Dip Creek Limestone	Actinostromatida, Actinostromatidae	
Amnestostroma	A. steloges	Dip Creek Limestone	Stromatoporellida, Hermatostromatidae	
?Anostylostroma	A. sp.	Chinaman Creek Limestone; Dip Creek Limestone; Lomandra Limestone	Clathrodictyida, Tienodictyidae	
Atelodictyon	A. repandum	Lomandra Limestone	Clathrodictyida, Tienodictyidae	
Atelodictyon	A. cf. lazutkini	Chinaman Creek Limestone; Lomandra Limestone	Clathrodictyida, Tienodictyidae	
Atopostroma	A. distans	Dip Creek Limestone; Chinaman Creek Limestone; Lomandra Limestone	Syringostromatida, Coenostromatidae	
Columnostroma	C. sp.	Dosey Limestone	Syringostromatida, Coenostromatidae	
Gerronostroma	G. doseyense	Dosey Limestone	Clathrodictyida, Clathrodictyidae	
Gerronostroma	?G. apertum	Lomandra Limestone	Clathrodictyida, Clathrodictyidae	
Gerronostroma	G. sp. A	Lomandra Limestone	Clathrodictyida, Clathrodictyidae	
Gerronostroma	G. sp. B	Stanley Limestone Member, Mytton Formation	Clathrodictyida, Clathrodictyidae	
Hermatostroma	H. malletti	Chinaman Creek Limestone; Dip Creek Limestone	Stromatoporellida, Hermatostromatidae	
Nexililamina	N. dipcreekensis	Chinaman Creek Limestone; Dip Creek Limestone	Clathrodictyida, Tienodictyidae	
Parallelopora	P. sp.	Chinaman Creek Limestone	Syringostromatida, Parallelostromatidae	
Pseudoactinodictyon	P. lozvense	Lomandra Limestone	Clathrodictyida, Tienodictyidae	
Rosenella	R. sp.	Chinaman Creek Limestone; Dip Creek Limestone	Labechiida, Rosenellidae	
Stachyodes	S. costulata	Stanley Limestone Member, Mytton Formation	Stromatoporellida, Stachyoditidae	
Stictostroma	S. pustulosum	Chinaman Creek Limestone	Stromatoporellida, Stromatoporellidae	
Stromatoporella	S. sp.	Lomandra Limestone	Stromatoporellida, Stromatoporellidae	
Stylostroma	S. sp.	Lomandra Limestone	Labechiida, Labechiidae	
Tienodictyon	T. stirpiferum	Chinaman Creek Limestone; Dip Creek Limestone	Clathrodictyida, Tienodictyidae	
?Trupetostroma	?T. tubulosum	Dip Creek Limestone	Stromatoporellida, Hermatostromatidae	

=== Trilobites ===
Trilobites of the Broken River Group
Genus	Species	Formations	Clade	Images
?Astycorphye	?A. sp.	Undifferentiated section (locality 3)	Proetida, Tropidocoryphidae	
Aulacopleura	A. sp.	Mytton Formation Undifferentiated section (locality 3)	Proetida, Aulacopleuridae	Fossil of A. konincki.
Burgesina	B. mawsonae	Uncertain (‘Fish Hill’ locality)	Proetida, Proetidae	
Otarion	O. sp.	Spanner Limestone Member, Papilio Formation; Uncertain (‘Fish Hill’ locality)	Proetida, Tropidocoryphidae	
Phacops	P. P. brocki	Papilio Formation	Phacopida, Phacopidae	Fossil of P. rana.
Phacops	P. sp.	Mytton Formation; Undifferentiated section (locality 3)	Phacopida, Phacopidae	Fossil of P. rana.
Proteus	P. Devonoproteus latimargo	Undifferentiated section (locality 3); Uncertain (‘Fish Hill’ locality)	Proetida, Proetidae	
Proteus	P. Devonoproteus sparsinodosus	Undifferentiated section (locality 3)	Proetida, Proetidae	
Scutellum	S. tenuistriatum	Papilio Formation	Corynexochida, Styginidae	
