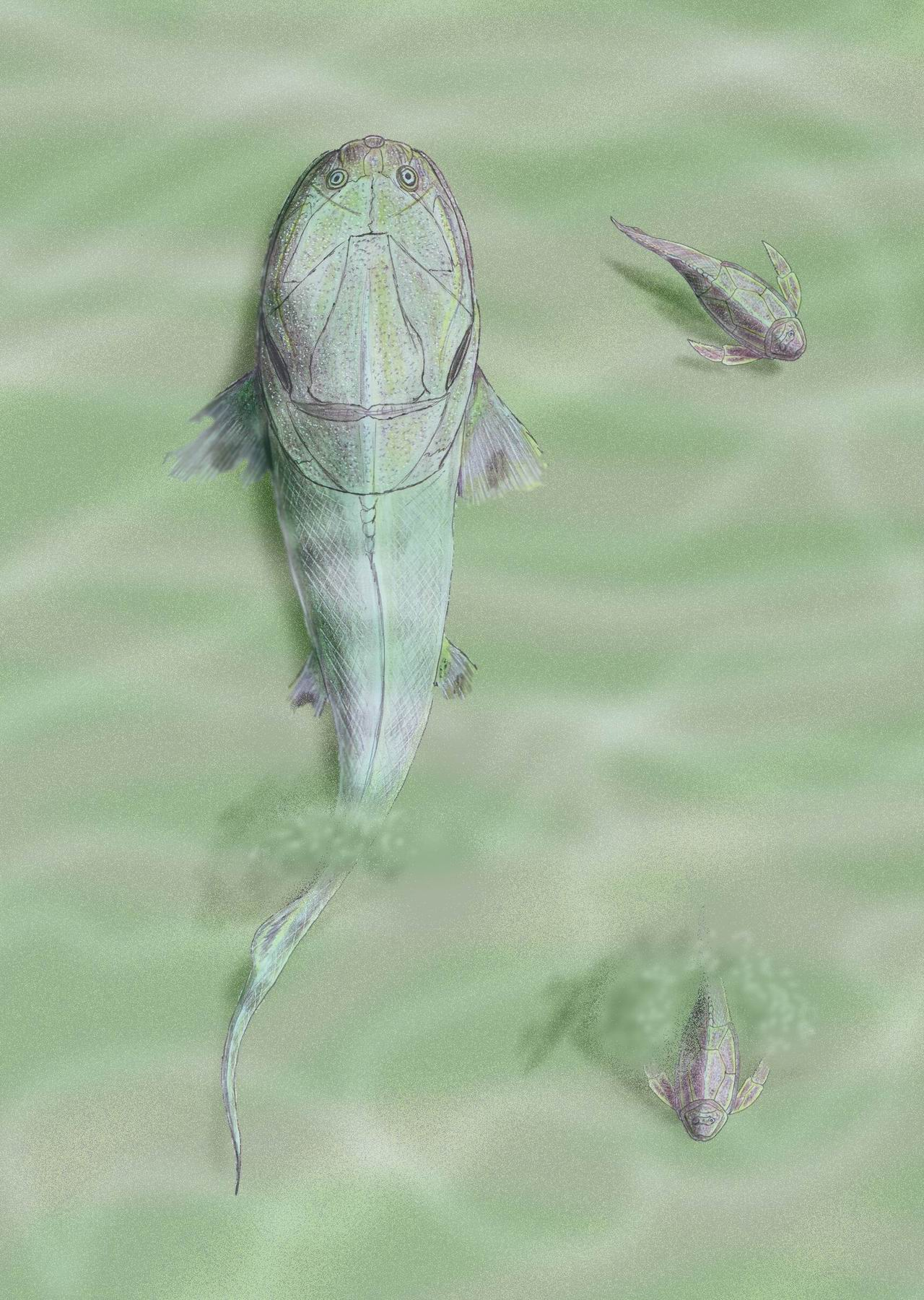
- Homostius milleri

Scientific classification
- Kingdom: Animalia
- Phylum: Chordata
- Class: †Placodermi
- Order: †Arthrodira
- Suborder: †Brachythoraci
- Clade: †Eubrachythoraci
- Clade: †Migmatocephala; Lelièvre, 1995?

Genera
- †Homostius formosissimus (Asmuss, 1856); †Atlantidosteus hollardi (Lelièvre, 1984; †Tityosteus rieversi (Gross, 1960); †Taemasosteus novaustrocambricus? (White, 1952); †Antineosteus lehmani (Lelièvre, 1984)

= Migmatocephala =

Migmatocephala Temporal range: (Emsian to Givetian) 407.7–382.7 Ma

Clade of fish

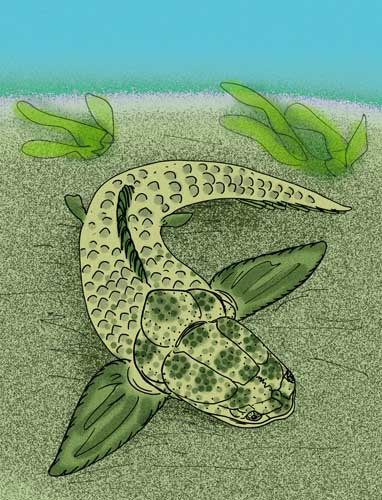
Tityosteus rieversi

Migmatocephala is a clade of placoderm fish within the suborder Brachythoraci. Migmatocephala includes the homostiids Taemasosteus?, Tityosteus, Antineosteus, Atlantidosteus, and Homosteus.

== Phylogeny ==
The cladogram shown here is based on "A new species of Atlantidosteus Lelièvre, 1984 (Placodermi, Arthrodira, Brachythoraci) from the Middle Devonian of the Broken River area (Queensland, Australia)".

- Migmatocephala
  - Taemasosteus?
  - - Tityosteus
    - - Antineosteus
      - - Atlantidosteus
        - Homostius
