= Paleobiota of the Sydney Sandstone =

Fossil flora & fauna of the Sydney Sandstone

The Sydney Sandstone, or the Hawkesbury Sandstone, is a sedimentary rock named after Sydney, and the Hawkesbury River north of Sydney, where this sandstone is particularly common. A wide variety of fossil taxa, spanning from temnospondyls to insects and even plants, are known from the formation's rocks.

== Vertebrates ==
Color key: Taxon / Reclassified taxon / Taxon falsely reported as present / Dubious taxon or junior synonym / Ichnotaxon / Ootaxon / Morphotaxon

Notes
Uncertain or tentative taxa are in small text
~~crossed out~~ taxa are discredited.

=== Chondrichthyes ===
Chondrichthyans of the Sydney Sandstone
Genus	Species	Localities	Clade	Images
Palaeoxyris	P. duni	Beacon Hill Quarry	Hybodontiformes incertae sedis	Fossil of P. duni.
Xenacanthus	X. sp.	Somersby Quarry	Xenacanthiformes, Xenacanthidae	Fossil of X. sp.

=== Ceratodontiformes ===
Lungfishes of the Sydney Sandstone
Genus	Species	Localities	Clade	Images
Ariguna	A. formosa	Beacon Hill Quarry	Ceratodontiformes, Ceratodontidae	Fossil of A. formosa.
Gosfordia	G. granulatus	Somersby Quarry	Ceratodontiformes, Ceratodontidae	Fossil of G. truncata.

=== Palaeoniscidiformes ===
Palaeoniscidiformes of the Sydney Sandstone
Genus	Species	Localities	Clade	Images
Agecephalichthys	A. granulatus	Beacon Hill Quarry	Palaeoniscidiformes, Palaeoniscidae	Fossil of A. granulatus.
Leptogenichthys	L. longus	Beacon Hill Quarry	Palaeoniscidiformes, Palaeoniscidae	Fossil of L. longus.
Megapteriscus	M. longicaudatus	Beacon Hill Quarry	Palaeoniscidiformes, Stegotrachelidae	Fossil of M. longicaudatus.
Myriolepis	M. clarkei	Beacon Hill Quarry; Cockatoo Island	Palaeoniscidiformes, Palaeoniscidae	Fossil of M. clarkei.
Myriolepis	M. lata	Beacon Hill Quarry	Palaeoniscidiformes, Palaeoniscidae	Fossil of M. lata.

=== Perleidiformes ===
Perleidiformes of the Sydney Sandstone
Genus	Species	Localities	Clade	Images
Cleithrolepis	C. altus	Beacon Hill Quarry	Perleidiformes, Cleithrolepididae	Fossil of C. altus
Cleithrolepis	C. granulatus	Beacon Hill Quarry; Cockatoo Island; Hornsby Heights Quarry; Somersby Quarry; Tambourine Bay Sewer Tunnel; Wahroonga Claypit; Woolloomooloo Bay; Woronora Dam	Perleidiformes, Cleithrolepididae	Fossil of C. granulatus
Cleithrolepis	C. sp.	Duffys Forest Quarry	Perleidiformes, Cleithrolepididae	
Manlietta	M. crassa	Beacon Hill Quarry	Perleidiformes, Colobodontidae	Fossil of M. crassa.
Procheirichthys	P. ferox	Beacon Hill Quarry	Perleidiformes, Colobodontidae	Fossil of P. ferox.
Zeuchthiscus	Z. australis	Hornsby Heights Quarry	Perleidiformes, Perleididae	Fossil of Z. australis.

=== Redfieldiiformes ===
Redfieldiiformes of the Sydney Sandstone
Genus	Species	Localities	Clade	Images
Brookvalia	B. gracilis	Beacon Hill Quarry; Gore Hill Brickpit	Redfieldiiformes, Brookvaliidae	Fossil of B. gracilis.
Brookvalia	B. latipennis	Beacon Hill Quarry	Redfieldiiformes, Brookvaliidae	
Brookvalia	B. propennis	Beacon Hill Quarry	Redfieldiiformes, Brookvaliidae	Fossil of B. propennis.
Brookvalia	B. spinosa	Beacon Hill Quarry	Redfieldiiformes, Brookvaliidae	Fossil of B. spinosa.
Brookvalia	?B. sp.	Hornsby Heights Quarry	Redfieldiiformes, Brookvaliidae	
Geitonichthys	G. ornatus	Beacon Hill Quarry	Redfieldiiformes, Redfieldiidae	Fossil of G. ornatus.
Molybdichthys	M. junior	Beacon Hill Quarry	Redfieldiiformes, Redfieldiidae	Fossil of M. junior.
Phlyctaenichthys	P. pectinatus	Beacon Hill Quarry	Redfieldiiformes, Brookvaliidae	Fossil of P. pectinatus.
Schizurichthys	S. pulcher	Beacon Hill Quarry	Redfieldiiformes, Redfieldiidae	Fossil of S. pulcher.

=== Parasemionotiformes ===
Parasemionotiformes of the Sydney Sandstone
Genus	Species	Localities	Clade	Images
Enigmatichthys	E. attenuatus	Beacon Hill Quarry	Parasemionotiformes, incertae sedis	Fossil of E. attenuatus.
Enigmatichthys	E. sp.	Hornsby Heights Quarry	Parasemionotiformes, incertae sedis	Fossil of E. sp.
Promecosomina	P. formosa	Beacon Hill Quarry	Parasemionotiformes, Promecosominidae	Fossil of P. formosa.

=== Other fishes ===
Other fishes of the Sydney Sandstone
Genus	Species	Localities	Clade	Images
Belichthys	B. longicaudatus	Beacon Hill Quarry	Chondrostei, incertae sedis	Fossil of B. longicaudatus.
Belichthys	B. magnidorsalis	Beacon Hill Quarry	Chondrostei, incertae sedis	Fossil of B. magnidorsalis.
Belichthys	B. minimus	Beacon Hill Quarry	Chondrostei, incertae sedis	Fossil of B. minimus.
Macroaethes	M. altus	Beacon Hill Quarry	Pholidopleuriformes, Pholidopleuridae	Fossil of M. brookvalei.
Macroaethes	M. brookvalei	Beacon Hill Quarry; Hornsby Heights Quarry	Pholidopleuriformes, Pholidopleuridae	Fossil of M. brookvalei.
Mesembroniscus	M. longisquamosus	Beacon Hill Quarry	Ptycholepidiformes, Ptycholepididae	Fossil of M. longisquamosus.
Saurichthys	S. gigas	Somersby Quarry	Saurichthyiformes, Saurichthyidae	Fossil of S. gigas.
Saurichthys	S. parvidens	Beacon Hill Quarry	Saurichthyiformes, Saurichthyidae	Fossil of S. parvidens.
?Thoracopterus	?T. sp.	Beacon Hill Quarry	Peltopleuriformes, Thoracopteridae	Fossil of ?T. sp.

=== Temnospondyli ===
Temnospondyls of the Sydney Sandstone
Genus	Species	Localities	Clade	Images
Subcyclotosaurus	S. brookvalensis	Beacon Hill Quarry	Temnospondyli, Mastodonsauridae	Restored skull of S. brookvalensis.
Indeterminate	indet. sp.	Cockatoo Island	Temnospondyli, Stereospondyli incertae sedis	

== Invertebrates ==
Color key: Taxon / Reclassified taxon / Taxon falsely reported as present / Dubious taxon or junior synonym / Ichnotaxon / Ootaxon / Morphotaxon

Notes
Uncertain or tentative taxa are in small text
~~crossed out~~ taxa are discredited.

=== Bivalvia ===
Bivalves of the Sydney Sandstone
Genus	Species	Localities	Clade	Images
Cyzicus	C. coghlani	Beacon Hill Quarry	Diplostraca, Limnadiidae	
Cyzicus	C. sp.	Beacon Hill Quarry	Diplostraca, Limnadiidae	Fossil of Cyzicus sp.
Palaeolimnadiopsis	P. bassi	Beacon Hill Quarry	Diplostraca, Limnadiidae	Fossil of P. bassi.
Protovirgus	P. brookvalensis	Beacon Hill Quarry	Venerida, Glauconomidae	Fossil of P. brookvalensis.

=== Insecta ===
Insects of the Sydney Sandstone
Genus	Species	Localities	Clade	Images
Austroidelia	A. perplexa	Beacon Hill Quarry	Grylloblattodea, Mesorthopteridae	Fossil of A. perplexa.
Beaconiella	B. fennahi	Beacon Hill Quarry	Hemiptera, Curvicubitidae	Fossil of B. fennahi.
Beaconiella	B. multivenata	Beacon Hill Quarry	Hemiptera, Curvicubitidae	Fossil of B. multivenata.
Clathrotitan	C. scullyi	Beacon Hill Quarry	Titanoptera, Mesotitanidae	Fossil of C. scullyi.
Choristopanorpa	C. bifasciata	Beacon Hill Quarry	Mecoptera, Orthophlebiidae	Fossil of C. bifasciata.
Fletcheriana	F. triassica	Beacon Hill Quarry	Hemiptera, Dunstaniidae	Fossil of T. triassica.
Mesacredites	M. elongata	Beacon Hill Quarry	Orthoptera, Locustavidae	Fossil of M. elongata.
Mesonotoperla	M. sinuata	Beacon Hill Quarry	Plecoptera, Eutheniidae	Fossil of M. sinuata.
Prohagla	P. superba	Beacon Hill Quarry	Orthoptera, Haglidae	Fossil hindwing of P. superba.
Tillyardomyrmeleon	T. petermilleri	Beacon Hill Quarry	Odonata, Protomyrmeleontidae	Fossil of T. petermilleri.
Triassocytinopsis	T. paranotalis	Beacon Hill Quarry	Hemiptera, Hylicellidae	Fossil of T. paranotalis.
Triassodoecus	T. chinai	Beacon Hill Quarry	Hemiptera, Progonocimicidae	Fossil of T. chinai.
Blattaria indet.	indet. sp.	Beacon Hill Quarry	Blattaria incertae sedis	Fossil of the Beacon Hill blattarian.
Coleoptera indet.	indet. sp.	Beacon Hill Quarry	Coleoptera incertae sedis	Fossil of the Beacon Hill coleopteran.
Mecoptera indet.	indet. sp.	Beacon Hill Quarry	Mecoptera incertae sedis	Fossil of the Beacon Hill mecopteran.
Odonata indet.	indet. sp.	Beacon Hill Quarry	Odonata incertae sedis	Fossil of the Beacon Hill odonatan.

=== Other invertebrates ===
Other invertebrates of the Sydney Sandstone
Genus	Species	Localities	Clade	Images
Anaspidites	A. antiquus	Beacon Hill Quarry	Anaspidacea, Anaspidesidae	Fossil of A. antiquus.
Austrolimulus	A. fletcheri	Beacon Hill Quarry	Xiphosura, Austrolimulidae	Fossil of A. fletcheri.
Brookvalichnus	B. obliquus	Beacon Hill Quarry	Venerida, Glauconomidae	Trace fossil B. obliquus.
Synaustrus	S. brookvalensis	Beacon Hill Quarry	Euthycarcinida, Euthycarcinidae	Fossil of S. brookvalensis.
Tremanotus	T. maideni	Cockatoo Island	Bellerophontida, Bellerophontidae	
Crustacea indet.	indet. sp.	Somersby Quarry	Crustacea, incertae sedis	
Scorpiones indet.	indet. sp.	Beacon Hill Quarry	Scorpiones, incertae sedis	

== Plants ==
Color key: Taxon / Reclassified taxon / Taxon falsely reported as present / Dubious taxon or junior synonym / Ichnotaxon / Ootaxon / Morphotaxon

Notes
Uncertain or tentative taxa are in small text
~~crossed out~~ taxa are discredited.

=== Plants ===
Plants of the Sydney Sandstone
Genus	Species	Localities	Clade	Images
Cladophlebis	C. australis	Woolloomooloo Bay	Osmundales, Osmundaceae	Fossil of Cladophlebis sp.
Cladophlebis	?C. sp.	Beacon Hill Quarry	Osmundales, Osmundaceae	Fossil of Cladophlebis sp.
Dicroidium	D. acutum	Woolloomooloo Bay	Corystospermales, Corystospermaceae	
Dicroidium	D. elongatum	Woolloomooloo Bay	Corystospermales, Corystospermaceae	
Dicroidium	D. feistmenteli	Beacon Hill Quarry	Corystospermales, Corystospermaceae	Fossil of D. feistmenteli.
Dicroidium	D. odontopteroides	Woolloomooloo Bay	Corystospermales, Corystospermaceae	
Dicroidium	D. spinifolium	Woolloomooloo Bay	Corystospermales, Corystospermaceae	
Ginkgo	G. digitata	Beacon Hill Quarry	Ginkgoales, Ginkgoaceae	Fossil of G. digitata.
Ginkgoites	G. sp.	Beacon Hill Quarry	Ginkgoales, Ginkgoaceae	Fossil of G. australis.
Lepidopteris	L. madagascariensis	Beacon Hill Quarry	Peltaspermales, Peltaspermaceae	Fossil of L. madagascariensis
Lepidopteris	L. stormbergensis	Woolloomooloo Bay	Peltaspermales, Peltaspermaceae	Fossil of L. madagascariensis
Neocalamites	N. hoerensis	Woolloomooloo Bay	Equisetales, Neocalamitaceae	Fossil of ?N. sp.
Neocalamites	?N. sp.	Beacon Hill Quarry	Equisetales, Neocalamitaceae	Fossil of ?N. sp.
Phyllotheca	P. sp.	Beacon Hill Quarry	Equisetales, Phyllothecaceae	Fossil of P. sp.
Reinistia	R. sp.	Somersby Quarry	Peltaspermales, Peltaspermaceae	Fossil of Reinitsia sp.
Reiniztia	R. spathulata	Berowra Creek Quarry	Peltaspermales, Peltaspermaceae	
Skilliostrobus	S. australis	Scaddens Quarry	Lepidodendrales, Lepidodendraceae	
Taeniopteris	T. lentriculiformis	Freshwater Headland	Marattiales, Marattiaceae	Fossil of T. lentriculiformis.
Townroviamites	T. brookvalensis	Beacon Hill Quarry	Equisetales, Equisetaceae	Fossil of T. brookvalensis.
Pleuromeiaceae indet.	indet. sp.	Beacon Hill Quarry	Pleuromeiaceae, incertae sedis	
Voltziales indet.	indet. sp.	Beacon Hill Quarry	Voltziales, incertae sedis	
Umkomasiales indet.	indet. sp.	Beacon Hill Quarry	Umkomasiales, incertae sedis	
