= Atlantidosteus =

Atlantidosteus Temporal range: (Emsian to Eifelian) 407.7–387.7 Ma

Scientific classification
- Kingdom: Animalia
- Phylum: Chordata
- Class: †Placodermi
- Order: †Arthrodira
- Suborder: †Brachythoraci
- Family: †Homostiidae
- Genus: †Atlantidosteus; Lelièvre, 1984

Species
- †A. hollardi (Lelièvre) 1984 †A. pacifica (Young) 2003

Extinct genus of homostiid arthrodire

Atlantidosteus is an extinct genus of homostiid arthrodire from the Early to Middle Devonian of Morocco and Queensland. It contains two known species, A. hollardi and A. pacifica.

== Description ==
Atlantidosteus pacifica is known from a right suborbital plate, found in the Broken River Group of Queensland, Australia.

== Phylogeny ==
Atlantidosteus is part of the clade Migmatocephala, closer related to Homostius, than Antineosteus.

- Tityosteus
- - Antineosteus
  - - Atlantidosteus
    - Homostius

The cladogram shown here is based on Young, 2003
