= Cavanosteus =

Cavanosteus Temporal range: Emsian

Scientific classification
- Kingdom: Animalia
- Phylum: Chordata
- Class: †Placodermi
- Order: †Arthrodira
- Suborder: †Brachythoraci
- Family: †Homostiidae
- Genus: †Cavanosteus; Young, 2004

Species
- C. australis (McCoy, 1876)

Extinct genus of fish

Cavanosteus is an extinct genus of homostiid arthrodire from the Emsian of Victoria, and New South Wales (Murrumbidgee Group), Australia.

== Description ==
Cavanosteus is known from central plates of the skull, infragnathals with little or no dentition, similar in form to Homosteus, and a bone from the dermal trunk shield.
