= Chudleigh Subgroup =

Subgroup of Ordovician geologic formations in Tasmania, Australia

- Stratigraphic range: Upper Mid–Late Ordovician (Darriwilian–Katian) 469.4–445.2 Ma
- Type: Geological group (subgroup)
- Unit of: Gordon Group
- Sub-units: Standard Hill Fm., Ugbrook Fm., Sassafras Creek Fm., Dogs Head Fm., Mole Creek Fm., Overflow Creek Fm., Den Fm.
- Underlies: Unnamed siltstone, likely Eldon Group
- Overlies: Moina Sandstone
- Thickness: 1,200 m (3,900 ft)

Lithology
- Primary: Micrite
- Other: Dolomite, shale, siltstone

Location
- Location: Mole Creek, Tasmania
- Coordinates: 41.5570°S 146.4077°E (Mole Creek)
- Region: Tasmania
- Country: Australia
- Chudleigh Subgroup (Australia) Chudleigh Subgroup (Tasmania)

The Chudleigh Subgroup is a stratigraphical subgroup dating back to the Mid–Late Ordovician, specifically ranging between the Darriwilian–Katian stages, between 469.4 and 445.2 million years ago based on correlation with the old Australian stages. It is made up of seven formations: Standard Hill Fm., Ugbrook Fm., Sassafras Creek Fm., Dogs Head Fm., Mole Creek Fm., Overflow Creek Fm. and Den Fm. The subgroup underlies an unnamed siltstone and is part of the Gordon Group. It comprises the following formations in stratigraphic order:

Formations of the Chudleigh Subgroup
Chudleigh Subgroup	Formation	Stage	Period
Chudleigh Subgroup	Den Fm.	Katian	Late Ordovician
Chudleigh Subgroup	Overflow Creek Fm.	Katian	Late Ordovician
Chudleigh Subgroup	Mole Creek Fm.	Katian	Late Ordovician
Chudleigh Subgroup	Dogs Head Fm.	Katian	Late Ordovician
Chudleigh Subgroup	Sassafras Creek Fm.	Katian	Late Ordovician
Chudleigh Subgroup	Sassafras Creek Fm.	Sandbian	Late Ordovician
Chudleigh Subgroup	Ugbrook Fm.	Sandbian	Late Ordovician
Chudleigh Subgroup	Standard Hill Fm.	Darriwilian	Middle Ordovician

== Description ==
The Chudleigh Subgroup, 1,200 m (3,900 ft) thick, is a sequence primarily consisting of micritic carbonates and lesser amounts of shales and siltstones, which are found as outcrops ranging from the limestone quarry south of the Mersey River, to the northern slope of Standard Hill. The subgroup is anything but lithologically monotonous as it comprises seven formations, which are all easily visible, mappable and are conformable with each other.

=== Den Formation ===
The Den Formation, 133 m (436 ft) thick, consists of sparsely fossiliferous micrites and coralline calcirudites, outcropping between the valley slopes to the east of the bend in the Mersey River, where the Den Plains can be overlooked, and 120 m (390 ft) north of the Den homestead. Exposures of decent quality are located within a minor syncline near the entrance of a quarry, as well as through the quarry section.

The formation's base is outlined via a bed which is rich in corals, located on top of the Overflow Creek Formation. 55 m (180 ft) of micrites and coralline which is dolomitic in areas, which then grade up into 38 m (125 ft) of scantly fossiliferous micrites which contain numerous thin 30 mm (1.2 in) black shales. Above that is 40 m (130 ft) of fossil-poor, grey to white micrite, which contains calcite-filled, thread-like fenestrae.

A variety of corals are found in the Den Formation, including Favistina and Palaeophyllum, which are present close to the base of the formation, and 8 m (26 ft) above the base is where Falsicatenipora sp. and Plasmoporella occur, possibly Grewingkia as well. Foerstephyllum is located in higher rocks, followed by Diploepora, Favistina, Favosites, Falsicatenipora, Tryplasma, and Streptelasma. Stromatoporoids include Clathrodictyon plicatum, C. molense, C. sp., Ecclimadictyon undatum, Labechia, Labechiella, Rosenella and Aulacera. Multiple species of bivalves and bryozoans are also known, as well as the nautiloid aff. Augustoceras molense. The Den Formation is likely subtidal due to the abundance and diversity of corals.

=== Overflow Creek Formation ===
The Overflow Creek Formation measures to 240 m (790 ft) of fossil-poor dolomitic micrites, dolomitic siltites, and dolomicrites and dolosiltites which outcrop between a small hill south of the road to Mole Creek, and the small outcrop to the north of the gate to The Den. South of Standard Hill the formation is 370 m (1,210 ft). From the top of a hill 700 m (2,300 ft) south of the Mole Creek quarry to the junction of a dry creek bed with Sassafras Creek, the exposure is considered to be of excellence. There is also good exposure on large bedding plane slabs in Overflow Creek and on the Mersey River's bank near Union Bridge.

The majority of the formation is comprised of 50 mm (2.0 in) thinly-bedded cryptalgal-laminated micrites which alternate with 10 mm (0.39 in) thick beds consisting of biointrasparites, dismicrites, dolomicrite, as well as randomly bioturbated micrites. Many of these micrites, containing corals and gastropod fragments, appear around the top of the formation. Small, 100 mm (3.9 in) tall, domal stromatolites are rare. Nautiloids and Palaeophyllum occur near the base of the formation, and the uppermost beds contain Eofletcheria. Stromatoporoids can be found in some pelmicrite beds, and gastropod fragments are found throughout the formation.

Disconformably overlying these dismicrite and pelmicrite beds are cross-bedded beds of calcarenite and pelmicrite, located near the top of the unit and contain the only conodonts from the formation. These units are thought to have been high intertidal channel deposits. High Sr, Mg and Na values in the Overflow Creek Formation are interpreted as indicating high salinities in either the depositional or the early diagenetic environment. Wedge-shaped calcite pseudomorphs of evaporites are found within a 30 cm (12 in) thick bed, which overlies a mudcracked dismicrite, south of Standard Hill. This evidence all indicates a tidal flat environment with the chance of some supratidal interludes.

=== Mole Creek Formation ===
The Mole Creek Formation is a sequence of fossiliferous black shales, calcarenites, red to grey quartz siltstones and minor micrites. The top, located in the northeastern section, is an unfossiliferous quartz siltstone 75 m (246 ft) above the basal, red-weathering, 60 mm (2.4 in) thick siltstone. In the northwestern section the Mole Creek Formation is 30 m (98 ft) thick, and the base consists of fine sandstone with the top being a biocalcarenite. In some localities, such as along Overflow Creek, the formation is fairly challenging to recognize and is represented by black, foetid, shaly, fossiliferous micrites. The formation is discontinuous south of Standard Hill, and outcrops are restricted to parts of a strike ridge, where 40 m (130 ft) of weathered, fossiliferous buff siltstone is located.

This siltstone contains the trilobites Pliomerina, illaenids, stictoporellid bryozoans, and the brachiopod Dinorthis, which the latter has been found in the northwestern section. In the northeastern section Eofletcheria and Nyctopora are found in micrites between two siltstones. A variety of nautiloids, brachiopods, bryozoans and other trilobites are located close to the top of the formation. The ostracod Dominina pagei is abundant, and is one of the few faunal links with the deeper, graptolite-bearing Shoemaker beds at Surprise Bay, Tasmania.

Even though the environment may not have been more than 5–10 m (16–33 ft) deep, the fauna are thought to be representing the deepest subtidal environment in the Chudleigh Subgroup. A lithology similar to this one appears in most of the Gordon Group units and hosts a similar fauna. With the limitations of micro- and macrofossil correlations taken into consideration, these sections (e.g., the Lords Siltstone in the Florentine Valley, basal part of the Precipitous Bluff beds, and the siltstone of the Gordon Group south of Zeehan) appear to be isochronous throughout Tasmania, leading to suggestions that there is relationship to basement heating and tectonic lifting, and a general tilting of Tasmania southwards, with the Mole Creek area shallowing and the Precipitous Bluff and Florentine Valley areas deepening.

=== Dogs Head Formation ===
The Dogs Head Formation is a 470 m (1,540 ft) thick sequence comprised of micrites and dolomitic micrites. Chert is abundant in the lower two thirds of the formation, and worm burrows are plentiful in the upper third. The formation's base lies just underneath the initial occurrence of chert nodules, and above a distinctive gastropodal/oncolitic horizon. The top on the other hand is defined by the occurrence of reddish-brown, trilobite-rich quartz siltstone. The Dogs Head Formation is exposed very well in places including Dogs Head Hill and the Mayberry section. The base rests immediately above the gastropod/Tetradium bed at the top of the Sassafras Creek Formation. The basal bed is a very dolomitic micrite which contains abundant, 40 mm (1.6 in) diameter stromatoporoids. Succeeding this are 470 m (1,540 ft) of micrites and dolomitic micrites that include many beds containing silicified shells and several chert nodule beds. A large portion of the sequence is composed of very dolomitic, strongly bioturbated micrites.

A total of four transgressive cycles are recognizable in the Dogs Head Formation. Each cycle initializes with dismicrites and cryptalgal-laminated dolomitic micrites, often mud-cracked, which are presumed to indicate supratidal to high intertidal environments. These high intertidal beds are overlain by very bioturbated, dolomitic micrites. Burrows, parallel to bedding, are abundant, often dolomitized and may cover up to 90% of the bedding planes. Oncolites are found in thin beds measuring 10 cm (3.9 in) and a single oncolitic bed measuring 3 m (9.8 ft) may be traced along strike for 2 km (1.2 mi). Each cycle ceases with a highly fossiliferous, silicified shell bed, seen either as representing a high subtidal or a very low intertidal environment.

The lowest fossil-rich strata contain Calathium and Labyrinthites, often associated with rotelliform gastropods in the northeastern section, while in the northwest occurs Foerstephyllum. Large Labechia colonies are abundant in the lower half of the formation, while Pachystylostroma is abundant around the top of the Dogs Head Formation, while Labechia, Labechiella, and Rosenella are rarer. Lichenaria (including L. ramosa), heliolitids and halysitids occur in the high intertidal to subtidal lithofacies throughout the formation. Cryptophragmus is found 320 m (1,050 ft) above the formation's base and Tetradium, which is not often found in life position, is quite bountiful, especially in the upper strata of the formation. Palaeophyllum appears about 400 m (1,300 ft) above the base, and Bajgolia (or ?Eofletcheria) is found in the upper third of the Dogs Head Formation in affiliation with Thamnobeatricia and Coccoseris. Trilobites are seldom silicified in this formation, although unsilicified trilobite segments occur often in thin sections. Pliomerina occurs in a single bed 300 m (980 ft) above the base of the formation. The nautiloids Discoceras and Gorbyoceras are present, alongside a diverse array of brachiopods (including Dinorthis and Holtedahlina, both from 70 m (230 ft) below the formation's top), bryozoans, gastropods and rostroconchs.

=== Sassafras Creek Formation ===
The Sassafras Creek Formation is a micrite and slightly dolomitic micrite sequence, about 145 m (476 ft) thick, which outcrops around Sassafras Creek. The formation's base consists of a 3 m (9.8 ft) crinoidal biocalcarenite, forming the foundation of a cliff section. The top comprises a 1.5 m (4.9 ft) thick oncolitic unit, which is succeeded by a gastropod-rich shell bed. The formation features good exposure at multiple localities, including its type section and a small abandoned quarry south of Standard Hill. The quarry showcases a 7 m (23 ft) thick sequence, which starting from the base, cryptalgal-laminated dolomitic micrites possessing 1 m (3.3 ft) tall stromatolites. Flat-pebble breccias and dismicrites overlain by bioturbated micrites that then transition upwards into a bryozoan, stromatoporoid, coralline unit interbedded with dolomite bands. Tetradium-rich micrites mark the sequence's end at the top. The basal calcarenite is succeeded by 138 m (453 ft) of dolomitic micrites bearing several shell beds. 410 m (1,350 ft) above the base of the Chudleigh Subgroup, a 10 cm (3.9 in) thick shell bed within which are large oncolites with a diameter up to 20 mm (0.79 in), which is perceived as the top of the formation.

Throughout the formation Labechia banksi and Lichenaria can be found, while Cryptophragmus and Rosenella are located in the upper strata. Pachystylostroma occurs in the uppermost part of the Sassafras Creek Formation, and in the lower strata of the overlying Dogs Head Formation.

=== Ugbrook Formation ===
The Ugbrook Formation, 120 m (390 ft) thick, is a sequence of nodular limestones, which conformably overlies the oncolitic Standard Hill Formation, and is overlain by the crinoidal biocalcarenite of the Sassafras Creek Formation. The formation outcrops on the small hill at the eastern end of Standard Hill, in outcrops east of Sassafras Creek, in a road cutting and south of Standard Hill, south of The Grunter.

The Standard Hill Formation phases through into the overlying Ugbrook Formation, both laterally and vertically. This may be observable at the eastern end of Standard Hill. 'Nodules' of micrite lie within beds 80–200 mm (3.1–7.9 in) thick and are surrounded by bioturbated mudstone which is pyritic in nature, and varies from black to reddish-brown when weathered. The same 'nodules' were likely formed by differential compaction of continuous beds of argillite and micrite, which were once alternating. Many of the bedding planes are covered by 3–5 mm (0.12–0.20 in) wide strips comprised of shell debris.

The formation is fossil-poor, however near The Grunter the base of the formation contains asaphids, rhynchonellids, and at a nearby road cutting strophomenids are plentiful. Species of Hesperorthis, Rhynchotrema, and a plectambonitacean genus are from both the base and top of the Ugbrook Formation, while Chaganella and possibly Oepikina are recorded from the top. The uppermost bed of the formation is micrite measuring 3 m (9.8 ft), which is abundant in trilobite remains. Conodonts are seldom found, but scolecodonts are bountiful.

=== Standard Hill Formation ===
The Standard Hill Formation, the oldest formation of the Chudleigh Subgroup, measures to about 145 m (476 ft) (140 m (460 ft) at The Grunter) thick and is a sequence harbouring oncolitic carbonates, minor dolomitic micrites and calcarenites, overlying the Moina Sandstone and underlying a nodular, argillaceous micrite at the majority of localities, but at and near The Grunter, it underlies calcarenites and quartz arenites. The formation outcrops around the northern slope of Standard Hill at its eastern end. Strain analyses of the deformed oncolites at The Grunter suggest that the pre-Devonian stratigraphic thickness was around 60% less.

The Standard Hill Member is defined as a distinctive lithostratigraphic unit, representing the Maclurites-Girvanella bed. This lithotype appears throughout the western half of Tasmania. The formation itself is exposed well at the eastern end of the northern slope of Standard Hill, but to the west it is covered by thick talus. It is also well exposed at The Grunter.

2 m (6.6 ft) of non-oncolitic dolomitic micrite is the lowest outcropping limestone. Near The Grunter the basal, shaley micrite features thin cryptalgal laminae and is overlain by 10 m (33 ft) of oncolitic limestone which bear shell beds with 'random' bioturbation. Succeeding this is about 130 m (430 ft) of interbedded oncolitic and oolitic sparites, cryptalgal-laminated micrites and biocalcarenites at The Grunter, and by oncolitic sparites, rarely oolitic, north of Standard Hill.

About 40 m (130 ft) of siliciclastics overlie the oncolitic limestone at The Grunter and nearby at Kubla Khan cave. At Kubla Khan, the quartz arenites contain asaphids and rhynchonellids. 20 m (66 ft) from the summit of The Grunter, the limestones are micrites, dolomitic micrites and non-oncolitic calcarenites, and contain thin 2 mm (0.079 in) undulating, prominent beds of quartz arenite separated by 50 cm (20 in) (on average) limestone. The occurrence rate of these siliciclastic beds increases towards the summit. A great deal of them are cross-bedded and indicate current directions hailing from the north. Multiple of these limestone beds contain an abundance of burrows, perpendicular to bedding. Some of the siliciclastic beds contain well-rounded vein quartz and are pebble-grade. A small portion of these quartz clasts are 10 mm (0.39 in) in diameter, which suggests proximity to land. The lenticular outcrop form of this siliciclastic member of the Standard Hill Formation and its ties to the possibly lagoonal and overlying Ugbrook Formation suggests that this member was deposited as an offshore bar.

Among the most notable fossil remains in the Standard Hill Formation include species of the chlorophyte Girvanella, the gastropod Maclurites florentinensis, which was distinctively flat-bottomed and served as a base for stromatoporoid colonies. Speaking of stromatoporoids, the species Stromatocerium bigsbyi, Stratodictyon vetus and Labechia aff. prima are known from the formation. In the biocalcarenite beds, strophomenid brachiopods are abundant, and the most abundant nautiloid of the formation is Standardoceras burretti.

== Paleobiota ==
=== Anthozoa ===
Anthozoans of the Chudleigh Subgroup
Genus	Species	Unit	Clade	Image
Diploepora	D. sp.	Den Fm.	Tabulata, Heliolitida incertae sedis	
Eofletcheria	E. sp.	Overflow Creek Fm.	Tabulata, Lyoporidae	
Grewingkia	G. sp.	Den Fm.	Rugosa, Streptelasmatidae	
Falsicatenipora	F. sp.	Den Fm.	Tabulata, Halysitidae	
Favistina	F. sp.	Den Fm.	Rugosa, Stauriidae	
Favosites	F. sp.	Den Fm.	Tabulata, Favositidae	
Foerstephyllum	F. sp.	Den Fm.	Tabulata, Billingsariidae	
Palaeophyllum	P. sp.	Den Fm.; Overflow Creek Fm.	Rugosa, Stauriidae	
Plasmoporella	P. sp.	Den Fm.	Tabulata, Plasmoporellidae	
Streptelasma	S. sp.	Den Fm.	Rugosa, Streptelasmatidae	
Tryplasma	T. sp.	Den Fm.	Rugosa, Tryplasmatidae	

=== Nautiloidea ===
Nautiloids of the Chudleigh Subgroup
Genus	Species	Unit	Clade	Image
Beloitoceras	?B. molense	Den Fm.	Oncocerida, Oncoceratidae	
Discoceras	D. sp.	Dogs Head Fm.	Tarphycerida, Trocholitidae	Fossil of the related Discoceras boreale.
Gorbyoceras	G. settlementense?	Dogs Head Fm.	Orthocerida,Proteoceratidae	
Standardoceras	S. burretti	Standard Hill Fm.	Orthocerida, incertae sedis	
Tasmanoceras	T. cf. zeehanense	Unknown (Probably either Sassafras Creek Fm. or Dogs Head Fm.)	Endocerida, Endoceratidae	

=== Stromatoporoidea ===
Stromatoporoids of the Chudleigh Subgroup
Genus	Species	Unit	Clade	Image
Alleynodictyon	A. sp.	Den Fm.	Labechiida, Aulaceridae	
Aulacera	A. denensis	Den Fm.	Labechiida, Aulaceridae	
Clathrodictyon	C. plicatum	Den Fm.	Clathrodictyida, Clathrodictyidae	
Clathrodictyon	C. molense	Den Fm.	Clathrodictyida, Clathrodictyidae	
Clathrodictyon	C. sp.	Den Fm.	Clathrodictyida, Clathrodictyidae	
Cystostroma	C. sp.	Den Fm.	Labechiida, Rosenellidae	
Labechia	L. regularis	Den Fm.	Labechiida, Labechiidae	Fossil of the related Labechia sp.
Labechia	L. variabilis	Den Fm.	Labechiida, Labechiidae	Fossil of the related Labechia sp.
Labechia	L. aff. prima	Standard Hill Fm.	Labechiida, Labechiidae	Fossil of the related Labechia sp.
Labechiella	L. sp.	Den Fm.	Labechiida, Labechiidae	
Pseudostylodictyon	P. sp.	Overflow Creek Fm.; Dogs Head Fm.	Labechiida, Rosenellidae	
Rosenella	R. woyuensis	Dogs Head Fm.	Labechiida, Rosenellidae	
Stylostroma	S. busense	Den Fm.; Dogs Head Fms	Labechiida, Labechiidae	
Stylostroma	S. ugbrookense	Dogs Head Fm.	Labechiida, Labechiidae	
Thamnobetricea	?T. vesiculosa	Overflow Creek Fm.	Labechiida, Rosenellidae	

=== Trilobitida ===
Trilobites of the Chudleigh Subgroup
Genus	Species	Unit	Clade	Image
Pliomerina	P. trisulcata	Mole Creek Fm.	Phacopida, Pliomeridae	
