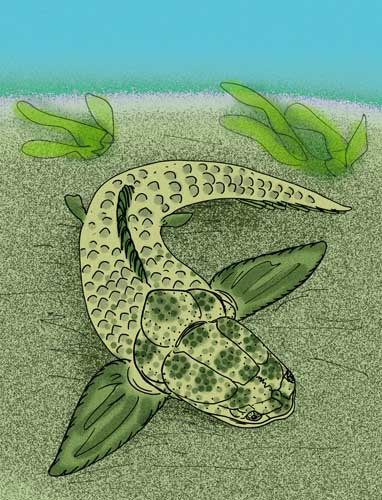
- Artist's reconstruction of T. rieversi

Scientific classification
- Kingdom: Animalia
- Phylum: Chordata
- Class: †Placodermi
- Order: †Arthrodira
- Suborder: †Brachythoraci
- Family: †Homostiidae
- Genus: †Tityosteus; Gross, 1960
- Species: †T. rieversi

Binomial name
- †Tityosteus rieversi Gross, 1960

= Tityosteus =

Tityosteus Temporal range: Emsian

Extinct genus of fish

Tityosteus is an extinct genus of homostiid arthrodire from the Early Emsian of the Early Devonian, with fossils known from Germany, the Ibero-Armorican Trough, and southern Siberia. It attained a length of 2.5 meters.

== Description ==
Tityosteus has only an 11 cm right marginal plate known, and margin ends and parts, in addition to the central plate overlap area being broken. However, Denison, 1978 said that it had a nuchal, attaining a length of 25 cm. The book also estimates T. rieversi of reaching lengths of 2.5 m (8.2 feet). According to "Tityosteus, A MARINE FISH (ARTHRODIRA, HOMOSTIIDAE) FROM THE EMSIAN OF ARAGÓN, SPAIN, AND ITS DISTRIBUTION", given Tityosteus's distribution, and Carolowilhelma (a pelagic arthrodire), being from similar facies as Tityosteus (Eifelian of Aragón, Spain), it may have been pelagic, and able to cross open waters.

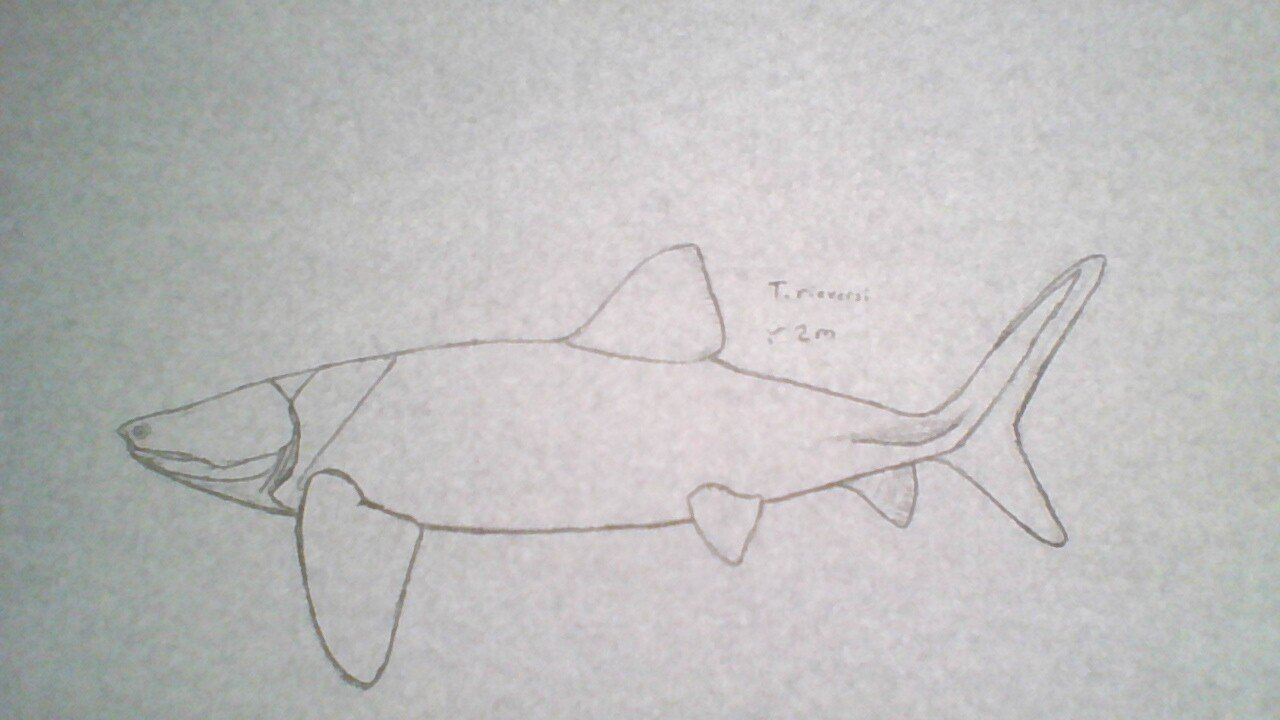
T. rieversi with a caudal fin capable of efficient open-ocean crossing, whilst being a filter feeder, as suggested for homostiids.

== Diet ==
While the inferognathals of Tityosteus have not been found, they could be either "toothless", like Homosteus, which has been suggested to be planktivorous, or possessing fine denticles, like Antineosteus. It has been suggested that Tityosteus probably was similar to the whale shark, in size, and habitat.

== Phylogeny ==
Tityosteus is part of the clade Migmatocephala, with other homostiids.

This cladogram is based on "FISH FROM THE EMSIAN OF ARAGÓN".

- Taemasosteus
- - Tityosteus
  - - Antineosteus
    - Homostius

- - Migmatocephala
  - Eubrachythoraci
