= Cathlesichthys =

Cathlesichthys Temporal range: Early Devonian

Scientific classification
- Kingdom: Animalia
- Phylum: Chordata
- Class: †Placodermi
- Order: †Arthrodira
- Suborder: †Brachythoraci
- Family: †Homostiidae
- Genus: †Cathlesichthys; Young, 2004
- Species: †C. weejasperensis

Binomial name
- †Cathlesichthys weejasperensis Young, 2004

Extinct genus of homostiid arthrodire

Cathlesichthys is an extinct genus of homostiid arthrodire from the Murrumbidgee Group in New South Wales, Australia, during the Early Devonian.

== Etymology ==
The generic epithet honors Ian and Helen Cathles, being a compound of their surname combined with the Greek word for fish ιχθύς (ichthýs). The specific epithet refers to the location of where it was found (Wee Jasper).

== Description ==
Cathlesichthys is known from an incomplete paranuchal, and nuchal plates, attaining a skull length of around 20 cm.
