= Distacodontidae =

Distacodontidae Temporal range: 478.6–382.7 Ma

Scientific classification
- Kingdom: Animalia
- Phylum: Chordata
- Infraphylum: Agnatha
- Class: †Conodonta
- Order: †Protopanderodontida
- Family: †Distacodontidae; Bassler, 1925

Extinct family of jawless fishes

Distacodontidae is an extinct family of conodonts in the order Protopanderodontida.
