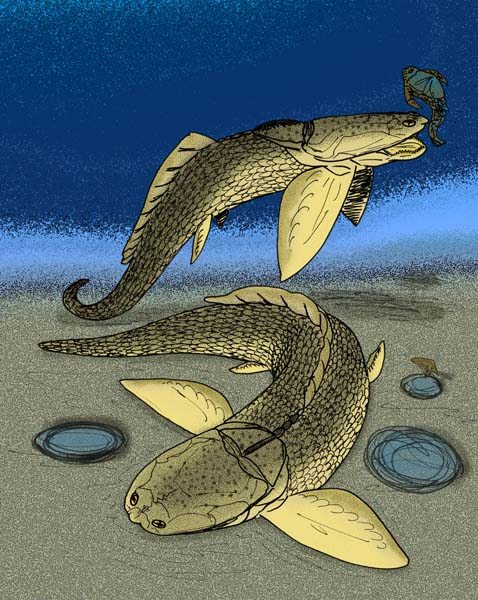
- Artist's reconstruction

Scientific classification
- Domain: Eukaryota
- Kingdom: Animalia
- Phylum: Chordata
- Class: †Placodermi
- Order: †Arthrodira
- Suborder: †Brachythoraci
- Family: †Homostiidae
- Genus: †Angarichthys; Obruchev, 1927
- Species: †A. hyperboreus

Binomial name
- †Angarichthys hyperboreus Obruchev, 1927

= Angarichthys =

Angarichthys Temporal range: Middle Devonian

Extinct genus of fishes

Angarichthys hyperboreus is an extinct homostiid arthrodire placoderm from the Middle Devonian (either upper Eifelian or lower Givetian) of Siberia. It is known from an infragnathal plate, an intero-lateral plate, and a marginal plate found from the Middle Devonian strata of the Tynep Series formation, in the Bakhta River basin, Tunguska Plateau. A. hyperboreus differs from Homosteus in that the former's marginal plate has a ridge where the central plate would have overlapped it, and in the infragnathal, which is curved sigmoidally, and bears at least seven tooth-like prongs nearer to the functional anterior end (the plate, which is fragmentary, suggests that the intact plate would have borne several more).

The living animal would have been fairly large, as the head shield is estimated to be at least 40 centimeters long.
