= Zeuchthiscus =

Zeuchthiscus Temporal range: Early Triassic

Scientific classification
- Kingdom: Animalia
- Phylum: Chordata
- Class: Actinopterygii
- Order: †Perleidiformes
- Family: †Perleididae
- Genus: †Zeuchthiscus; Wade, 1940
- Species: †Z. australis

Binomial name
- †Zeuchthiscus australis Wade, 1940

Extinct genus of fishes

Zeuchthiscus is a genus of prehistoric ray finned fish that lived in Australia during the Early Triassic Period. Its fossils were found in the Hornsby Heights Quarry of the Sydney Sandstone. It is believed to have been a nektonic omnivore. Closely related fish had a wide distribution in the Northern Hemisphere.

== See also ==
- List of prehistoric bony fish
