= Cryptophragmus =

Cryptophragmus Temporal range: 456.1–449.5 Ma

Scientific classification
- Domain: Eukaryota
- Kingdom: Animalia
- Phylum: Porifera
- Class: †Stromatoporoidea
- Order: †Labechiida
- Family: †Aulaceratidae
- Genus: †Cryptophragmus; Raymond, 1914
- Species: †C. antiquatus

Binomial name
- †Cryptophragmus antiquatus Raymond, 1914

Extinct genus of sponges

Cryptophragmus is an extinct genus of sponges in the extinct family Aulaceratidae. Species are from the Ordovician of Australia, Canada (Ontario), China and the United States (Georgia, Virginia).

== See also ==
- List of prehistoric sponge genera
