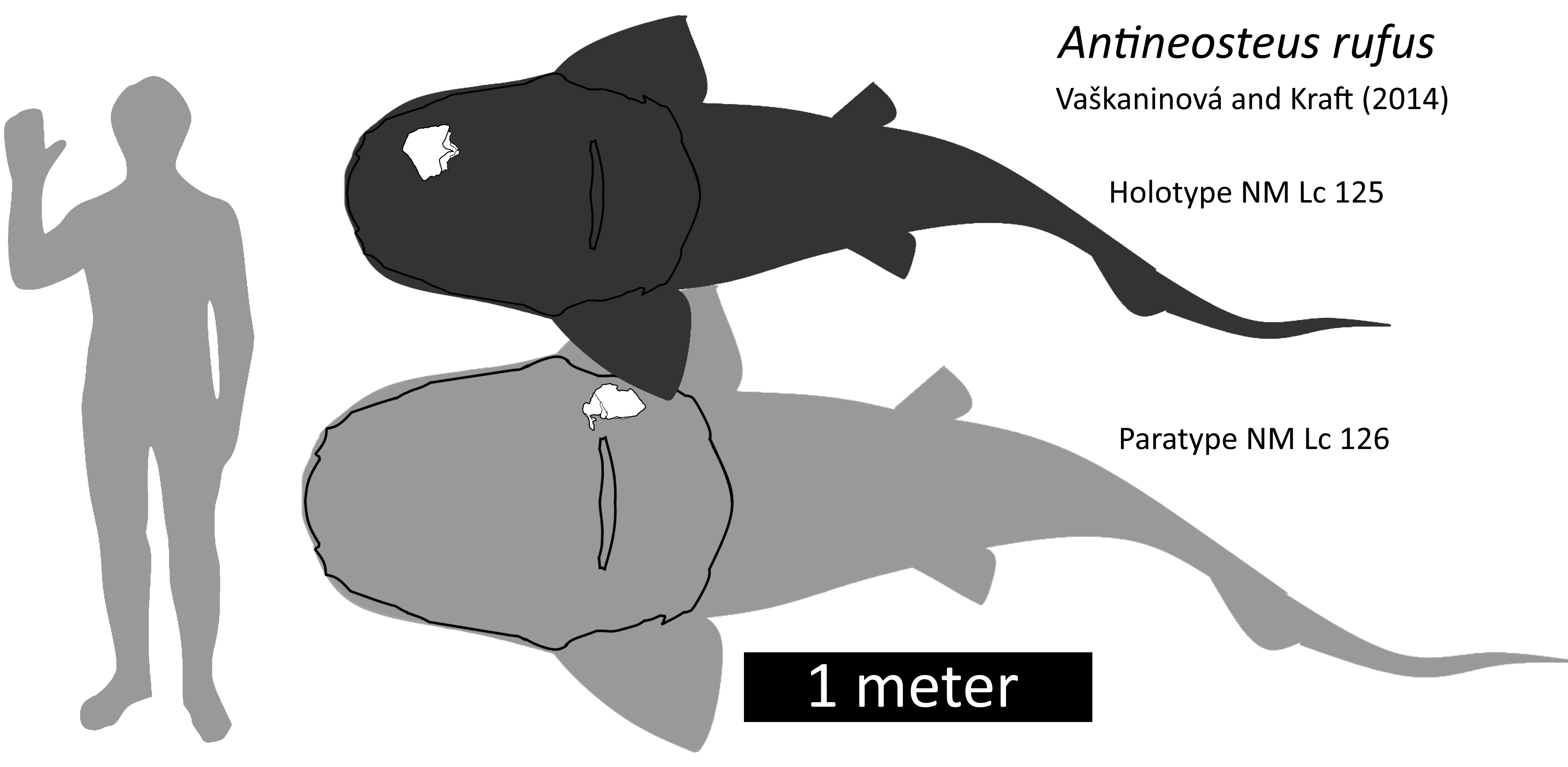
- Known materials and size comparison of Antineosteus rufus

Scientific classification
- Kingdom: Animalia
- Phylum: Chordata
- Class: †Placodermi
- Order: †Arthrodira
- Suborder: †Brachythoraci
- Family: †Homostiidae
- Genus: †Antineosteus; Lelièvre, 1984

Type species
- Antineosteus lehmani Lelièvre, 1984

Species
- A. lehmani Lelièvre, 1984; A. rufus Vaškaninová and Kraft, 2014

= Antineosteus =

Antineosteus Temporal range: Emsian

Extinct genus of homostiid arthrodire

Antineosteus is an extinct genus of homostiid arthrodire from the Emsian, Early Devonian Kess-Kess Mounds, in the eastern Anti-Atlas Mountains, Morocco, and the Barrandian area of the Czech Republic.

== Description ==
Antineosteus lehmani is rather fragmentary, known from a left anterior dorsolateral plate, a left paranuchal plate, and an inferognathal.

Antineosteus rufus is known from a nearly-complete right head shield plate, and a right anterior dorsolateral plate. A. rufus is estimated to exceed 3 m (9.8 ft), from measuring the plates with the ones from better-preserved, related taxa.

== Diet ==
Antineosteus, like many other members of Homostiidae, lacked bladed dentition on their jaws, and was large in size. These traits all in one animal support a planktivorous lifestyle, like baleen whales, or the whale shark, as supported by Denison, 1978, suggesting similar lifestyles for arthrodires like Homostius, making it reasonable for many homostiids to be suspension-feeders like the later Titanichthys.

== Phylogeny ==
Antineosteus is a homostiid, closest related to Homostius.

Taxonomy shown here is based on "FISH FROM THE EMSIAN OF ARAGÓN".

- Taemasosteus
- - Tityosteus
  - - Antineosteus
    - Homostius
