= Enigmatichthys =

Enigmatichthys Temporal range: Anisian

Scientific classification
- Kingdom: Animalia
- Phylum: Chordata
- Class: Actinopterygii
- Order: †Parasemionotiformes
- Genus: †Enigmatichthys; Wade, 1935
- Species: †E. attenuatus

Binomial name
- †Enigmatichthys attenuatus Wade, 1935

Extinct genus of fishes

Enigmatichthys is a genus of extinct freshwater ray-finned fish that lived during the Middle Triassic epoch of what is now Australia. It contains a single species, E. attenuatus from the Anisian-aged Wianamatta Group and Hawkesbury Sandstone. It was a very small fish whose taxonomic identity is difficult to verify (hence its name), although it is now at least considered a parasemionotiform.

== See also ==
- Prehistoric fish
- List of prehistoric bony fish
