= Reginaselache =

Reginaselache Temporal range: Viséan, 330 Ma

Scientific classification
- Kingdom: Animalia
- Phylum: Chordata
- Class: Chondrichthyes
- Subclass: Elasmobranchii
- Order: †Xenacanthiformes
- Family: †Diplodoselachidae
- Genus: †Reginaselache; Turner & Burrow, 2011

Type species
- Reginaselache morrisi Turner & Burrow, 2011

Extinct genus of cartilaginous fishes

Reginaselache is an extinct genus of xenacanthiform cartilaginous fish known from the Early Carboniferous (Mississippian age, mid-Viséan) of central Queensland, Australia. It was found in the middle the Ducabrook Formation, northwest of Springsure. It was first named by Susan Turner and Carole J. Burrow in 2011 and the type species is Reginaselache morrisi. It might have eaten palaeoniscoids and other fish and/or invertebrates.
