= Limbunya Group =

Geologic formation in Australia

- Stratigraphic range: ~1640 Ma
- Type: Group
- Overlies: Inverway Metamorphics
- Thickness: ~300-400 m

Location
- Country: Australia

The Limbunya Group is a group of late Paleoproterozoic formations from Australia. It contains several of the earliest eukaryotic fossils known, including several tubular forms and acritarchs.

== Paleobiota ==
After Riedman et al, 2023

Color key: Taxon / Reclassified taxon / Taxon falsely reported as present / Dubious taxon or junior synonym / Ichnotaxon / Ootaxon / Morphotaxon	Notes; Uncertain or tentative taxa are in small text; ~~crossed out~~ taxa are discredited.

=== Paleobiota ===
Paleobiota
Genus	Species	Notes	Images
Birrindudutuba	B. brigandina	Enigmatic tubular fossil, likely eukaryotic, covered in small circular plates.	
Kamolineata	K. elongata	Enigmatic ellipsoid fossil, likely eukaryotic	
Filinexum	F. torsivum	Enigmatic tubular fossil, likely eukaryotic, outer wall composed of bound fibres	
Satka	S. favosa	Enigmatic spherical fossil, likely eukaryotic, covered in small plates	
Siphonoseptum	S. bombycinum	Enigmatic filamentous fossil, bears similarities to both eukaryotic filaments and cyanobacteria	
Spiromorpha	S. segmentata	Enigmatic filamentous/ellipsoid fossil, likely eukaryotic	
Valeria	V. lophostriata	Enigmatic spherical fossil, likely eukaryotic, unusually small for the genus	
Dictyosphaera?	?D. macroreticulata	Eukaryotic acritarch, differs from the assigned species in shape yet closest resembles it.	
Gigantosphaeridium	G. fimbriatum; G. floccosum	Eukaryotic acritarch	
Limbunyasphaera	L. operculata	Eukaryotic acritarch, earliest known fossil with an operculum	
Tappania	T. plana	Eukaryotic acritarch	
Germinosphaera	G. bispinosa	Enigmatic acritarch	
Leiosphaeridia	L. crassa; L. jacutica; L. minutissima; L. tenuissima	Enigmatic acritarch, one of the widest-ranging Precambrian fossils	
Navifusa	N. majensis	Enigmatic acritarch, possibly eukaryotic	
Oscillatoriopsis	O. obtusa	Enigmatic filamentous fossil, likely bacterial	Line drawing reconstruction of Oscillatoriopsis
Pterospermopsimorpha	P. sp	Enigmatic filamentous fossil	
Siphonophycus	S. septatum; S. robustum; S. typicum; S. kestron; S. solidum; S. punctatum	Enigmatic filamentous fossil, likely bacterial	Line drawing reconstruction of Siphonophycus attenuatum
Tortunema	T. patomica	Enigmatic filamentous fossil	Line drawing reconstruction of Tortunema hermanii

Alongside these, several undescribed forms are also recorded. Forms A and B are eukaryotic in nature, with B particularly resembling Satka in its spherical shape and the presence of plates. Form B also bears similarities to another unnamed organism from the Tonian Chuar Group. The rest of the unnamed forms are mostly ellipsoidal or spherical in nature, with others being sheet-like or miscellaneous fragments.
