= Ducabrook Formation =

Carboniferous geologic formation in Queensland, Australia

- Stratigraphic range: Mississippian (Viséan); 335 Ma
- Type: Geological formation
- Unit of: Drummond Basin
- Underlies: Joe Joe Formation, Colinlea Sandstone
- Overlies: Star of Hope Formation
- Thickness: Up to 2,100 m (6,900 ft)

Lithology
- Primary: Sandstone, mudstone
- Other: Tuff, conglomerate facies, limestone

Location
- Location: Springsure, Queensland
- Coordinates: 24.1161°S 148.0886°E
- Region: Queensland
- Country: Australia
- Ducabrook Formation (Australia) Ducabrook Formation (Queensland)

The Ducabrook Formation is a Carboniferous period geological formation located near Springsure in Queensland, Australia. It dates specifically to the Viséan stage of the Mississippian subperiod, between approximately 335 million years ago.

== Geology ==
The Ducabrook Formation is up to 2,100 meters thick, and is the youngest unit of the Drummond Basin, and outcrops occur only in the southern part of the basin. The geology consists of a cyclical sequence comprising of interbedded volcanilithic sandstone and mudstone, primarily khaki-brown and olive-green in colour, with beds made of tuff, conglomerate, and limestone appearing occasionally. These sediments likely accumulated in shallow fluvialite and lacustrine environments. The formation overlies the Star of Hope Formation conformably, and is uncomforably overlain by either the Joe Joe Formation or Colinlea Sandstone, depending on the specific area. The Middle Paddock Locality (QM L1117) itself consists of grey-green fragile to hard sandstone coating bones with microscopic orange-brown roundish pebbles.

== Middle Paddock locality ==
The Middle Paddock (QM L1117), the most productive site of the Ducabrook Formation, is predominated comprised of soft, erosion prone siltstone. Interbeds of rather resistant lime-flake conglomerate, pebbly conglomerate, limestone and sandstone occur as shallowly dipping platforms on the floors of gullies and as remnant blocky outcrops. It contains an eroded drainage area at the head of a small stream system. The locality was discovered in 1995 by local landowners who sent gyracanth and tetrapod spine fragments to the Queensland Museum. Scientists later made a visit to the site when surfaced bones, some hailing from tetrapods, were collected over a four-hour timeframe.

In 1996, a five-day trip established the area over which more bones were weathering and worked the immediate vicinity for further exposures. Strata rich in palaeoniscoids were discovered, but nothing comparable to the larger fish or tetrapod fossils found at the main site. Small-scale excavation of the supposed main locality was carried out to record the state of preservation of in situ bone. Multiple well-preserved tetrapod postcranial elements were recovered from an area known as Middle Rise.

In 1997, another field trip at the site was gridded with iron stakes at 10 meter intervals, to be left in place permanently. The grid, measuring about 60 meters north to south and 70 meters east to west, covers the entirety of the fossil-bearing surface. All bones obtained has been designated as to grid square for future taphonomic study and entered onto an ACCESS database. At Middle Rise, a more extensive excavation began, concurrent with minor excavations elsewhere in search of more productive areas, which continued through 1998.

Between 1999 and 2001, the Middle Rise area was subsequently subdivided into 1 meter quares from which all material found was recorded with details. These twenty-two weeks of fieldwork have produced some 60 tetrapod elements representing at least four individuals.

== Paleobiota ==
Color key
Taxon	Reclassified taxon	Taxon falsely reported as present	Dubious taxon or junior synonym	Ichnotaxon	Ootaxon	Morphotaxon

Notes
Uncertain or tentative taxa are in small text; ~~crossed out~~ taxa are discredited.

=== Vertebrates ===
Vertebrates of the Ducabrook Formation
Genus	Species	Clade	Images
Ctenodus	C. boudariensis	Ceratodontiformes, Ctenodontidae	
Ctenodus	C. sp.	Ceratodontiformes, Ctenodontidae	
Gyracanthides	G. hawkinsi	Climatiiformes, Gyracanthidae	G. murrayi from Mansfield, Victoria.
Ossinodus	O. pueri	Stegocephalia, Whatcheeridae	Reconstruction of O. pueri.
Reginaselache	R. morrisi	Xenacanthiformes, Diplodoselachidae	
Strepsodus	S. sp.	Rhizodontiformes, Rhizodontidae	Tooth of Strepsodus sp.

=== Invertebrates ===
Invertebrates of the Ducabrook Formation
Genus	Species	Clade	Images
Leaia	L. sp.	Spinicaudata, Leaiidae	

=== Flora ===
Flora of the Ducabrook Formation
Genus	Species	Clade	Image
Lepidodendron	L. sp.	Lepidodendrales, Lepidodendraceae	Reconstruction of Lepidodendron.
