= Procheirichthys =

Procheirichthys Temporal range: Middle Triassic
- Procheirichthys fossil

Scientific classification
- Kingdom: Animalia
- Phylum: Chordata
- Class: Actinopterygii
- Order: †Perleidiformes
- Genus: †Procheirichthys; Wade, 1935

Extinct genus of fishes

Procheirichthys is an extinct genus of prehistoric bony fish that lived during the Middle Triassic epoch.

== See also ==
- Prehistoric fish
- List of prehistoric bony fish
