= Protopanderodontida =

Protopanderodontida Temporal range: Furongian (Upper Cambrian) – Wenlock Descendant taxa Panderodontida and Prioniodontida survive to the Middle Devonian and Late Triassic, respectively

Scientific classification
- Domain: Eukaryota
- Kingdom: Animalia
- Phylum: Chordata
- Subphylum: Vertebrata
- Infraphylum: Agnatha
- Class: †Conodonta
- Clade: †Euconodonta
- Order: †Protopanderodontida; Sweet, 1988

Synonyms
- Distacodontacea Miller, 1981

Extinct order of conodonts

Protopanderodontida is an order of conodonts which lived from the Furongian (Late Cambrian) to the Wenlock (mid-Silurian). They had a relative simple apparatus with several pairs of coniform elements (single-cusped tooth-like structures) in the mouth, lacking the more elaborate arrangements found in "complex conodonts" (Prioniodontida).

Protopanderodontids were a common component of Ordovician conodont faunas, and were probably a grade ancestral to later conodonts in the orders Panderodontida and Prioniodontida. They may have been the earliest conodonts with an odd number of elements in the jaw. A single median symmetrical element (the S_{0} element) is found at the midline of the apparatus, potentially originating from a fusion of paired coniform elements in an earlier ancestor. The only putative protopanderodontid to preserve an articulated partial apparatus is Besselodus arcticus, from the Late Ordovician of Greenland.

== Taxonomy ==
Sweet (1988) named both Protopanderodontida and Panderodontida as new conodont orders, identifying the former as ancestral to the latter. The main difference between the two orders is that the elements of panderodontids have deep furrows on their sides, while those of protopanderodontids bear shallow striations.

Sweet's decision to classify each group as inherently separate taxonomic orders would render Protopanderodontida a paraphyletic grade according to modern cladistic standards. Panderodontida could be reconsidered a suborder or superfamily within Protopanderodontida, though others note that this would not solve the issue of paraphyly, since Protopanderodontida is probably also ancestral to Prioniodontida. The "distacodontid" Paltodus has been proposed as a transitional form between protopanderodontids and "complex conodonts". Exclusively coniform conodonts such as protopanderodontids are noted to be notoriously difficult to classify.

=== List of families ===
- Acanthodontidae Lindström, 1970
- Clavohamulidae Lindström, 1970
- Drepanoistodontidae Fåhraeus & Nowlan, 1978 [Distacodontidae Bassler, 1925]
- Protopanderodontidae Lindström, 1970 [Scolopodontidae Bergström, 1981; Oneotodontidae Miller, 1980; Teridontidae Miller, 1981]
- Serratognathidae Zhen et al., 2009
- Strachanognathidae? Bergström, 1981 [Cornuodontidae Stouge, 1984]
- Incertae sedis
  - Besselodus? Aldridge, 1982
  - Dapsilodus? Cooper, 1976
