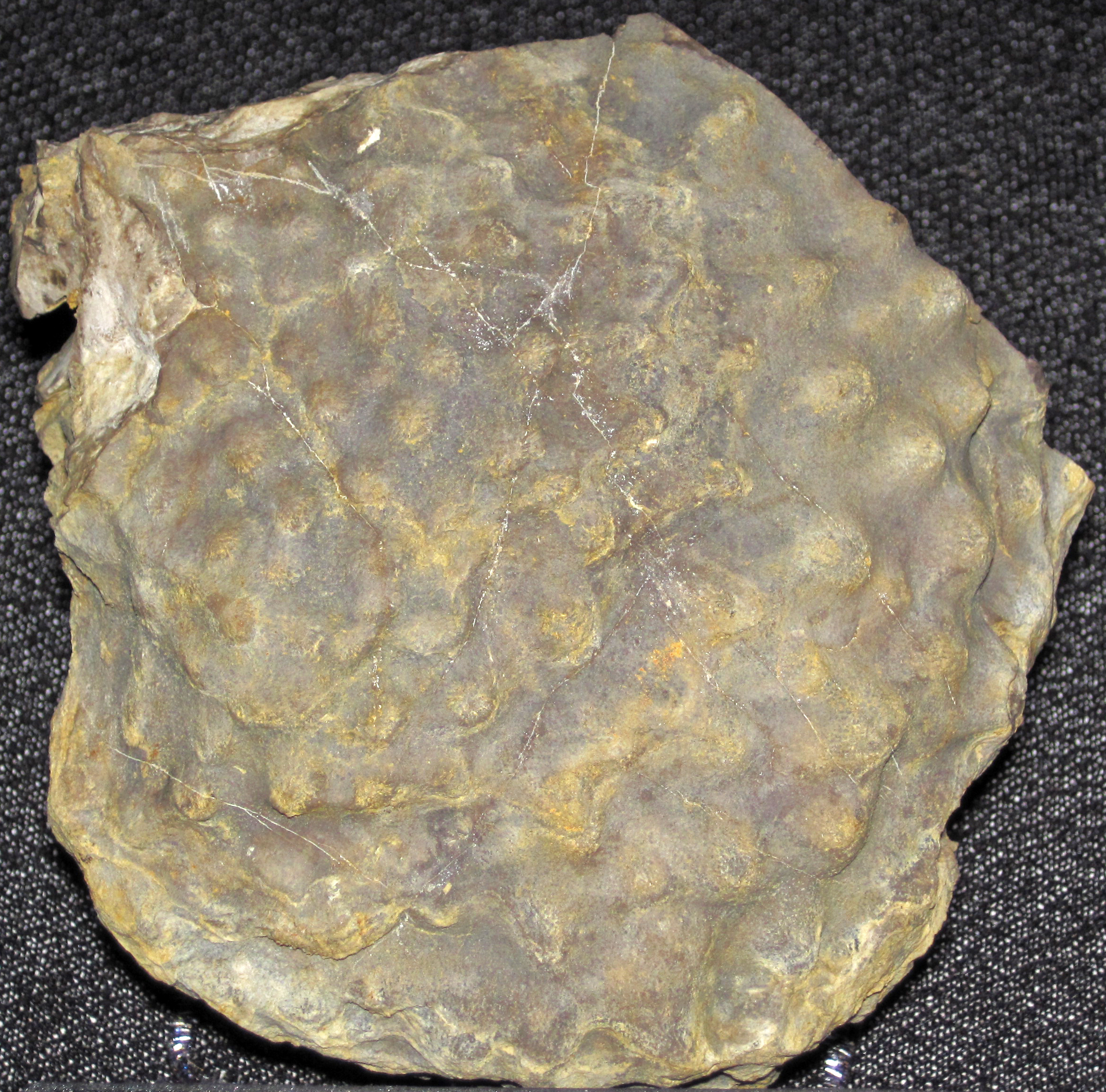
- Labechia sp. from Late Ordovician Ohio

Scientific classification
- Kingdom: Animalia
- Phylum: Porifera
- Class: †Stromatoporoidea
- Order: †Labechiida; Kühn, 1927

= Labechiida =

Labechiida Temporal range: Tremadocian–Famennian Possible reports as young as the Triassic

Extinct order of sponges

Labechiida is an extinct order of stromatoporoid sponges. They lived from the Early Ordovician (Tremadocian stage) to the Late Devonian (Famennian stage), though a few putative fossils have been reported from younger sediments. Labechiids were the first order of stromatoporoids to appear and were probably ancestral to all other orders in the main Paleozoic radiation (Stromatoporoidea sensu stricto). They were most diverse and abundant during the Middle-Late Ordovician and briefly again in the Famennian, when they were a major group of reef-building sponges. However, they were relatively uncommon through most of the Silurian and Devonian, in contrast to other stromatoporoids.

== Description ==
Labechiids can be differentiated from other stromatoporoids by having an internal structure emphasizing cysts (pockets roofed by flat or convex cyst plates) and pillars (solid rods perpendicular to the surface). The pillars may extend all the way to the surface and project out a short distance as small bumps known as papillae. Cyst plates may bear denticles (pointed thorns) or crenulations (pinched deflections) pointing upwards within the skeleton. Laminae (regular horizontal plates) are comparatively difficult to distinguish due to the more unorganized internal structure of labechiids compared to other stromatoporoids.

Mamelons are found in some species, while astrorhizae are indistinct or absent. Many labechiid fossils are poorly preserved, as their emphasis on cysts affords a lower skeletal density than other stromatoporoids. As a result, some traits used to distinguishing between taxa (such as pillar microstructure) may instead be taphonomic rather than biological in origin.

== Taxonomy ==
From The Treatise on Invertebrate Paleontology (Part E, Revised):

- Family Aulaceratidae Kühn, 1927
  - Alleynodictyon Webby, 1971 [Upper Ordovician (Katian)]
  - Aulacera Plummer, 1843 [Middle Ordovician (Darriwilian) – Upper Ordovician (Hirnantian)]
  - Cryptophragmus Raymond, 1914 [Upper Ordovician (Sandbian – Katian)]
  - Ludictyon Ozaki, 1938 [Middle Ordovician (Darriwilian) – early Silurian]
  - Pararosenella Vassilyuk & Bogoyavlenskaya, 1982 [Upper Devonian (Famennian)]
  - Quasiaulacera Copper, Stock, & Jin, 2013 [Upper Ordovician (Hirnantian)]
  - Sinabeatricea Jeon et al., 2022 [Upper Ordovician (Katian)]
  - Sinodictyon Yabe & Sugiyama, 1930 [Middle Ordovician (Darriwilian)]
  - Thamnobeatricea Raymond, 1931 [Middle Ordovician (Darriwilian) – Upper Ordovician (Katian)]
- Family Labechiidae Nicholson, 1879
  - Labechia Edwards & Haime, 1851 [Middle Ordovician (Darriwilian) – Upper Devonian (Famennian), Viséan?]
  - Labechiella Yabe & Sugiyama, 1930 [Middle Ordovician (Darriwilian) – Upper Devonian]
  - Stratodictyon Webby, 1969 [Upper Ordovician (Sandbian – Katian)]
- Family Lophiostromatidae Nestor, 1966
  - Dermatostroma Parks, 1910 [Upper Ordovician (Sandbian? – Katian)]
  - Lophiostroma Nicholson, 1891 [Early Ordovician (Tremadocian) – Upper Devonian (Frasnian), Triassic?]
  - Tarphystroma? Nestor, Copper, & Stock, 2010 [early Silurian (Llandovery)]
- Family Platiferostromatidae Khalfina & Yavorsky, 1973
  - Cystocerium Nestor, 1967 [mid-Silurian (Wenlock)]
  - Parastylostroma Bogoyavlenskaya, 1982 [Upper Devonian (Famennian)]
  - Platiferostroma Khalfina & Yavorsky, 1973 [Upper Devonian (Famennian)]
  - Pleostylostroma Wang, 1982 [early Silurian (Llandovery)]
  - Stromatodictyon? Khalfina, 1972 [early – mid Silurian (Llandovery – Wenlock)]
  - Vietnamostroma Nguyen Huu Hung & Mistiaen, 1998 [Upper Devonian (Famennian)]
- Family Rosenellidae Khalfina & Yavorsky, 1973
  - Cystostroma Galloway & St. Jean, 1957 [Lower Ordovician (Floian) – Upper Devonian]
  - Forolinia Nestor, 1964 [early Silurian]
  - Priscastroma Khromykh, 1999 [Middle Ordovician (Darriwilian)]
  - Pseudostylodictyon Ozaki, 1938 [Middle Ordovician (Darriwilian) – late Silurian]
  - Rosenella Nicholson, 1886 [Middle Ordovician (Darriwilian) – Upper Devonian (Famennian)]
  - Rosenellinella Yavorsky, 1967 [early – mid Silurian]
- Family Stromatoceriidae Bogoyavlenskaya, 1969
  - Cystistroma Etheridge, 1895 [Upper Ordovician (Sandbian – Katian)]
  - Radiostroma Webby, 1979 [Upper Ordovician (Katian)]
  - Stromatocerium Hall, 1847 [Upper Ordovician (Sandbian – Katian)]
- Family Stylostromatidae Webby, 1993
  - Eopennastroma Wang, 1978 [Upper Devonian (Famennian)]
  - Pachystylostroma Nestor, 1964 [Middle Ordovician (Darriwilian) – Upper Devonian]
  - Pennastroma Dong, 1964 [Upper Devonian (Famennian)]
  - Spinostroma Wang, 1978 [Upper Devonian (Famennian)]
  - Stylostroma Gorsky, 1938 [Upper Ordovician (Katian) – Upper Devonian]

== Evolution ==
=== Ordovician ===
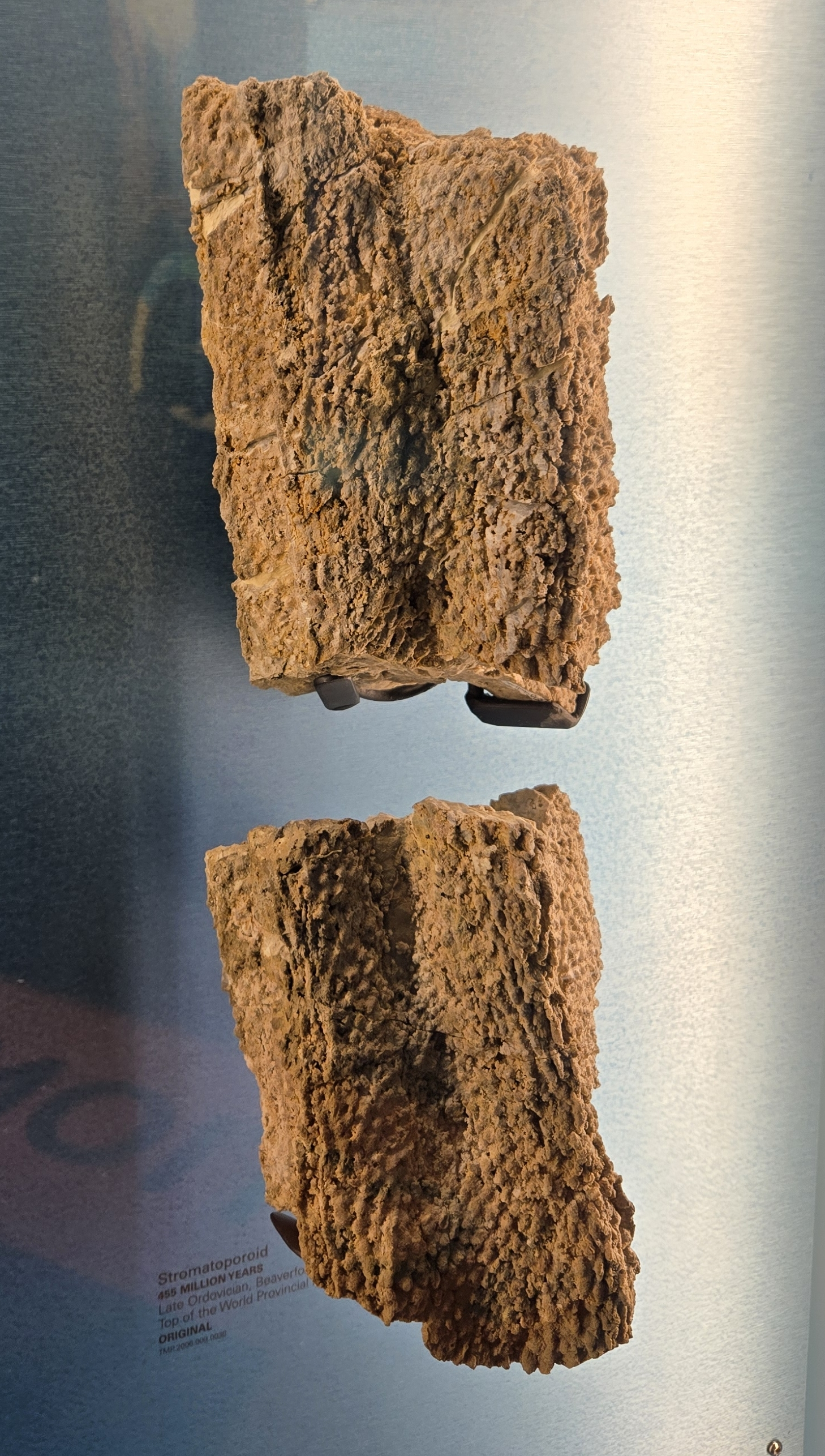
A partial fossil of Aulacera, a large column-shaped aulaceratid from Late Ordovician Canada.

The earliest reported labechiid species are from the Early Ordovician of South China: Lophiostroma leizunia (late Tremadocian) and Cystostroma primordia (Floian). The former species was a reef-builder while the latter was rare and small. Massive reefs appeared simultaneously worldwide in the mid- to upper-Darriwilian stage, near the end of the Middle Ordovician (~460 Ma). During the Darriwilian, 4 genera occur in the Chazy Group of eastern North America, 9 in the Machiakou Formation of North China, and several others are dispersed among Russia, Kazakhstan, Korea, and Malaysia. Most specialists agree that the ancestral labechiid was a member of the family Rosenellidae, but disagreement persists over which genus serves as the ancestral form. Studies focusing on North America and China generally consider the widespread Pseudostylodictyon or Cystostroma to be ancestral to other labechiids, while Russian paleontologists point to the Siberian Priscastroma. Labechiids as a whole may be descended from non-stromatoporoid sponges in the order Pulchrilaminida.

In the Sandbian stage of the Late Ordovician, labechiids spread to regions equivalent to Scotland and Australia, and some former Chinese endemics (such as the tree-shaped aulaceratids) populated Laurentia (North America) for the first time. During the Katian stage, labechiids reached their maximum diversity and were abundant in tropical reef ecosystems worldwide. They were significantly less common in temperate areas corresponding to Central Asia. Most Late Ordovician labechiid genera were cosmopolitan, while endemics were few. Global cooling in the first pulse of the Late Ordovician mass extinction (~445 Ma) led to the extinction of the short-lived family Stromatoceriidae, and Hirnantian-age stromatoporoid fossils are limited to only a few localities in Canada and Northern Europe. Only two labechiids (Aulacera and Pachystylostroma) retain any semblance of commonness during the extinction interval.

=== Silurian ===
Labechiids which survived into the Llandovery Epoch (early Silurian) were inconspicuous relative to other diversifying stromatoporoid orders such as clathrodictyids and actinostromatids. South China and Siberia were notable exceptions where labechiids temporarily remained the most diverse group of stromatoporoids. Even as stromatoporoids collectively reached their maximum Silurian diversity in the Wenlock Epoch (middle Silurian), labechiids were not among the beneficiaries. Labechiids were still rare in the Ludlow and Pridoli epochs (late Silurian), though the typical Ordovician genus Lophiostroma made an unexpected recovery in Baltica (Eastern Europe) and Turkey.

=== Devonian ===
No unambiguously new labechiid genera evolved through the entire Early and Middle Devonian, nor the Frasnian stage (the first part of the Late Devonian). Labechiid fossil occurrences during this time were spotty and consist entirely of hardy relicts which purportedly originated in the Ordovician. Stromatoporoid specialists have mixed interpretations of this phenomenon. The Devonian relicts may truly be the same as their Ordovician predecessors, persisting as rare and reclusive 'Lazarus taxa'. Alternatively, they could be misidentified fragments or new labechiid lineages acquiring a similar set of characteristics, so-called 'Elvis taxa'. In any case, Devonian labechiids never managed to repopulate southeast Laurussia (eastern North America) or high-latitude environments at any time during the period.

Unlike other stromatoporoids, labechiids were not adversely affected by the Kellwasser event (Late Devonian mass extinction) at the end of the Frasnian (~372 Ma). Instead, they experienced a diversification in the Famennian stage, reacquiring a level of diversity and dominance in their niche not experienced since the Ordovician. Most new genera arose from the families Stylostromatidae and Platiferostromatidae, which helped to form dense reef habitats alongside the older relict forms. The labechiid resurgence was strongest in shallow water and the Eastern Hemisphere.

Despite being reinvigorated after the Kellwasser event, labechiids and their reef ecosystems presumably did not survive the Hangenberg event (~359 Ma), a second mass extinction which marked the end of the Famennian stage and Devonian period. This extinction is generally considered absolute, but several possible exceptions have been reported to imply post-Devonian survival: Labechia carbonaria (from the Viséan stage of Carboniferous England) and Lophiostroma boletiformis (from Triassic rocks of the Pamir Mountains). These discontinuous reports pose the same set of questions applied to Early and Middle Devonian occurrences. Labechiid-like fossils are abundant in early Pennsylvanian (Bashkirian) reef deposits of the Akiyoshi Limestone Group in Japan, representing a Panthalassan seamount.
