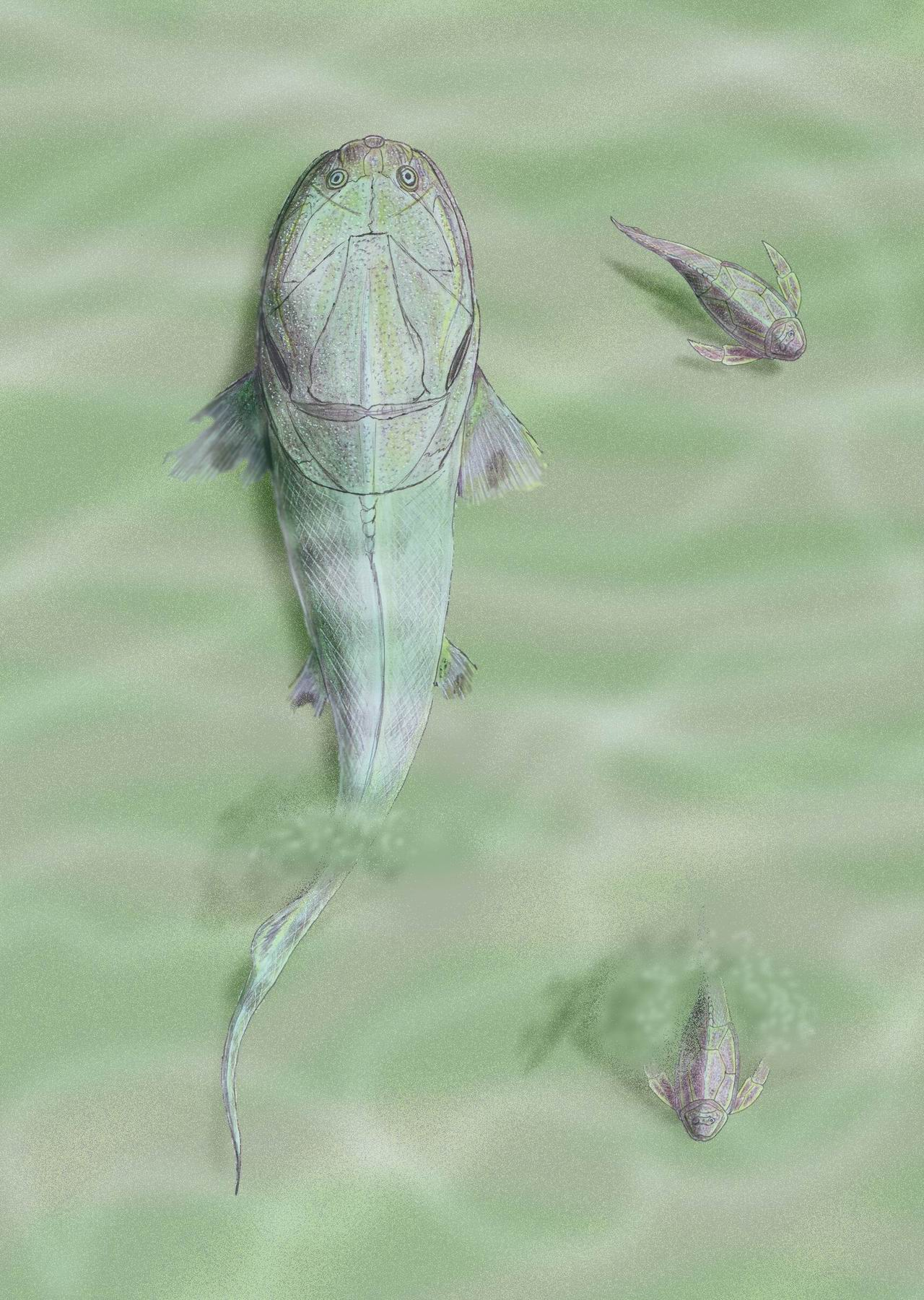
- Homosteus milleri

Scientific classification
- Kingdom: Animalia
- Phylum: Chordata
- Class: †Placodermi
- Order: †Arthrodira
- Suborder: †Brachythoraci
- Family: †Homostiidae; Jaekel, 1903

Type species
- Homosteus formosissimus Asmuss, 1856

Genera
- Angarichthys; Antineosteus; Atlantidosteus; Cavanosteus; Cathlesichthys; Euleptaspis; Dhanguura?; Homosteus; Lophostracon; Luetkeichthys; Tityosteus

Synonyms
- Chelonichthyidae Dean, 1901; Euleptaspididae Obruchev, 1964; (order) Temnothoraci Dean, 1901; (suborder) Homostei Jaekel, 1911

= Homostiidae =

Homostiidae Temporal range: Early Devonian–Middle Devonian

Extinct family of fishes

Homostiidae (alternatively spelled Homosteidae) is a family of flattened arthrodire placoderms from the Early to Middle Devonian. Fossils appear in various strata in Europe, Russia, Morocco, Australia, Canada and Greenland.

Homostiids have flattened and elongated skulls, "toothless" jaws and large sizes, suggesting that many were probably filter feeders, similar to the noticeably flattened whale shark. According to Denison 1978, primitive homostiids have moderately long median dorsal plates, whereas in "advanced" homostiids, the median dorsal tends to be short and broad.

== Classification ==
The family Homostiidae is considered the basal-most grouping within the suborder Brachythoraci, basal to the large sub-clade Eubrachythoraci, which includes the well-known Dunkleosteus, Dinichthys, etc. Homostiidae's placement within Brachythoraci can be shown in the cladogram below:

- Brachythoraci
  - Homostiidae
    - Homostius sulcatus
    - Antineosteus lehmani
  - - Buchanosteoidea
      - Buchanosteus confertituberculatus
      - Goodradigbeeon australianum
      - Parabuchanosteus murrumbidgeeni
    - - Dhanguura johnstoni
      - - Gemuendenaspis angusta
        - - Xiangshuiosteus wui
          - Eubrachythoraci
            - Coccosteomorphi
              - Coccosteoidea
                - Coccosteidae
                - Panxiosteidae
              - Incisoscutoidea
            - Pachyosteomorphi
              - Rhachiosteus pterygiatus
              - - Dunkleosteoidea
                - Aspinothoracidi

== Genera ==
=== Angarichthys ===
A comparatively large animal from the Middle Devonian of Siberia, with a head shield estimated around 40 centimeters long. Known only from an infragnathal bone, and an intero-lateral and a marginal plate.

=== Antineosteus ===
A primitive homostiid from Emsian-aged strata of Morocco. Antineosteus' primitive anatomical features suggest it may be a precursor to Angarichthys, Atlantidosteus and Homosteus. Antineosteus lived sympatrically with the Moroccan species of Atlantidosteus.

=== Atlantidosteus ===
This genus is known from species found in Emsian-aged Morocco and Middle Devonian Australia. Overall form is very similar to Antineosteus and Homosteus.

=== Cavanosteus ===
A primitive genus from Emsian-aged strata of Australia

=== Cathlesichthys ===
A genus of homostiid from the Murrumbidgee Group of New South Wales, Australia, living during the Early Devonian.

=== Euleptaspis ===
This genus is known from isolated plates and fragments from Lower Devonian-aged strata in Spitzbergen and Germany. The holotype of the type species, E. depressa, is a paranuchal plate very similar to those seen in coccosteids.

=== Dhanguura ===
A very large, primitive form from the Early Devonian Murrumbidgee Group of New South Wales, Australia. Its discoverer, Gavin Young, hypothesizes that it may have been a filter-feeder.

=== Homosteus ===
The type genus, known from both complete and fragmentary fossils in Europe, Russia, and North America.

=== Tityosteus ===
Tityosteus is thought to be the largest vertebrate known from the Lower Devonian, with an estimated length of 2.5 meters. The holotype is an incomplete individual from the Hunsrück.
