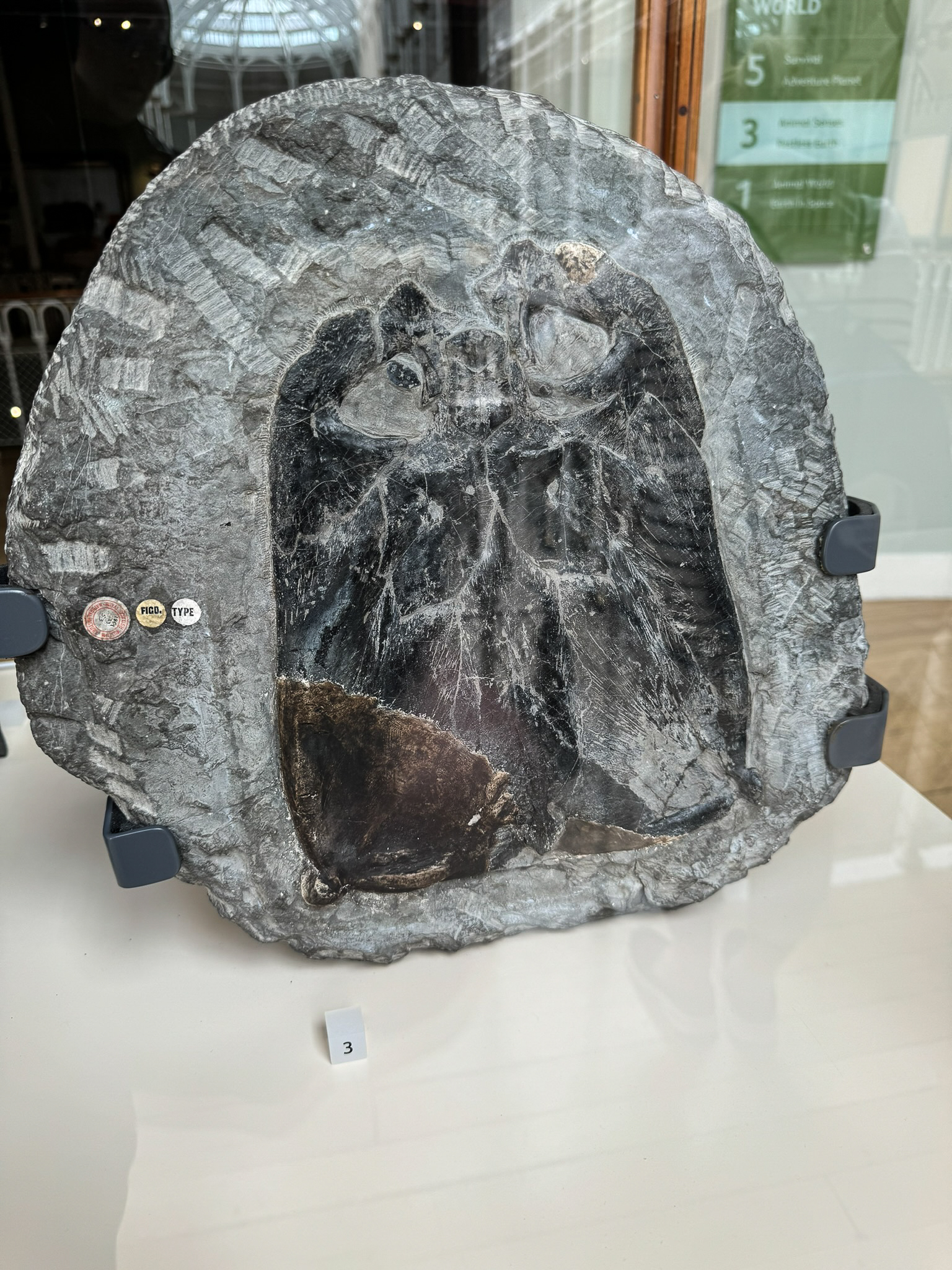
- H. milleri fossil, Scottish National Museum

Scientific classification
- Kingdom: Animalia
- Phylum: Chordata
- Class: †Placodermi
- Order: †Arthrodira
- Suborder: †Brachythoraci
- Family: †Homostiidae
- Genus: †Homosteus

Type species
- Homosteus formosissimus Asmuss 1856

Species
- †H. formosissimus Asmuss 1856; †H. arcticus Heintz 1934; †H. cf. arcticus Orvig 1969; †H. kochi Stensiö & Säve-Söderbergh 1938; †H. latus Asmuss 1856; †H. manitobensis (Okulitch) 1944; †H. milleri Traquair 1888; †H. sulcatus (Kutorga) 1837

Synonyms
- Dinichthys manitobensis Okulitch 1944; Homostius sp. Asmuss 1856; Homosteus anceps Asmuss 1856; Homosteus cataphractus Asmuss 1856; Homosteus ponderosus Asmuss 1856; Trionyx sulcatus Kutorga 1837; Trionyx latus Kutorga 1837

= Homosteus =

Homosteus Temporal range: Eifelian-?Givetian

Genus of fossil fishes

Homosteus (also commonly spelled Homostius) is a genus of flattened arthrodire placoderm from the Middle Devonian. Fossils are found primarily in Eifelian-epoch aged strata of Europe, Canada, Greenland, and Estonia.

== Description ==
All of the species had comparatively large, flattened heads with, as suggested by the upward opening orbits, upward-pointing eyes. These adaptations suggest that the various species were benthic predators. A study on Titanichthys, in contrast, suggests that species of Homosteus may have been filter-feeders instead.

== Taxonomy ==
=== H. formosissimus ===
The type species of the genus. It is a thin-plated species from the Eifelian-aged Aruküla beds of Estonia. Although H. sulcatus was described earlier in 1837, H. formosissimus is the official type species as it was the first to be described as a placoderm (H. sulcatus was originally described as a soft-shelled turtle). H. formosissimus had a small, thin keel down the dorsal-center of its median dorsal plate.

=== H. arcticus ===
This species is based on a 15 centimeter-long preorbital plate from the early Eifelian of the Wood Bay formations of Spitzbergen, Norway. Compared to other species, the anatomy of the plate suggests the species is very primitive for the genus. Denison, 1978, suggests that the species may be different enough to merit its own distinct genus.

=== H. cf. arcticus ===
Based on a specimen found in the Emsian epoch-aged layers of the Wood Bay formations of Spitzbergen. May or may not be of this genus.

=== H. kochi ===
This species is from the Givetian of Middle Devonian Greenland, of Canning Land, to be precise. H. kochi has a comparatively very narrow nuchal plate.

=== H. latus ===
A giant species from the Eifelian-aged Aruküla beds of Estonia, and may have existed sympatrically with H. formosissimus. H. latus differed from H. formosissimus in having comparatively thick plates, a large, massive crest-like keel along the dorsal-center of its medial dorsal plate, and head-plates over a meter in length. Originally described as "Trionyx latus Kutorga 1837"

=== H. manitobensis ===
This species is found in the Eifelian-aged Elm Point Limestone of Manitoba. Based on a pair of paranuchal and marginal plates originally referred to the genus Dinichthys. H. manitobensis is the only member of the genus found in North America proper.

=== H. milleri ===
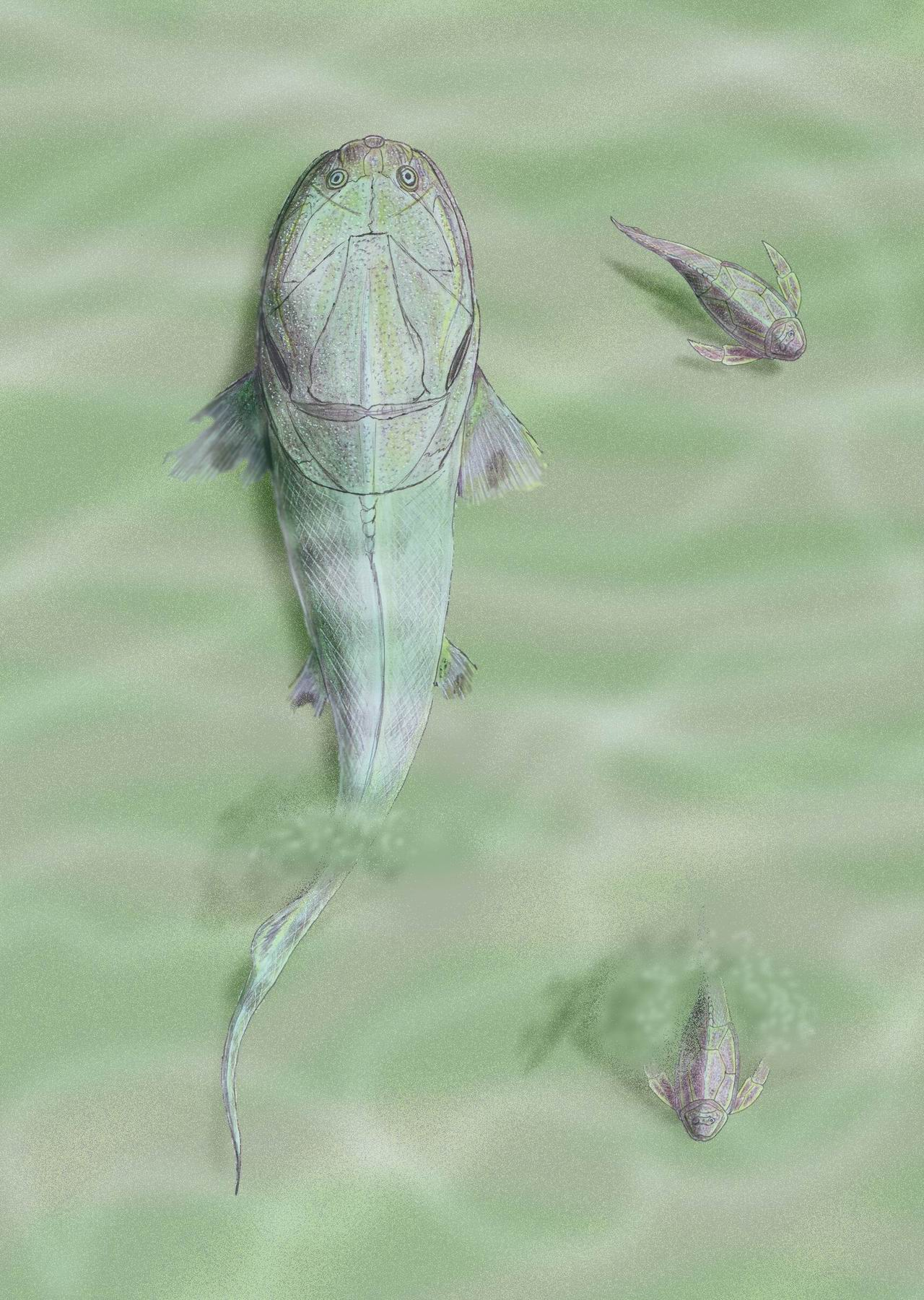
Life restoration of H. milleri

H. milleri is from the Givetian of what is now the Orkney and Shetland Islands. It is a medium-sized species with a comparatively very rectangular-shaped median dorsal plate. It is named for Hugh Miller.

=== H. sulcatus ===
Another species from the Eifelian-aged Aruküla beds of Estonia. Although H. sulcatus was described before H. formosissimus, H. sulcatus was originally described as a soft-shelled turtle, ne "Trionyx sulcatus Kutorga 1837". H. sulcatus had thick plates, and a well-developed keel on the dorsal-center of its median dorsal plate. It was larger than H. formosissimus, but still much smaller than H. latus.

== Palaeoenvironment ==
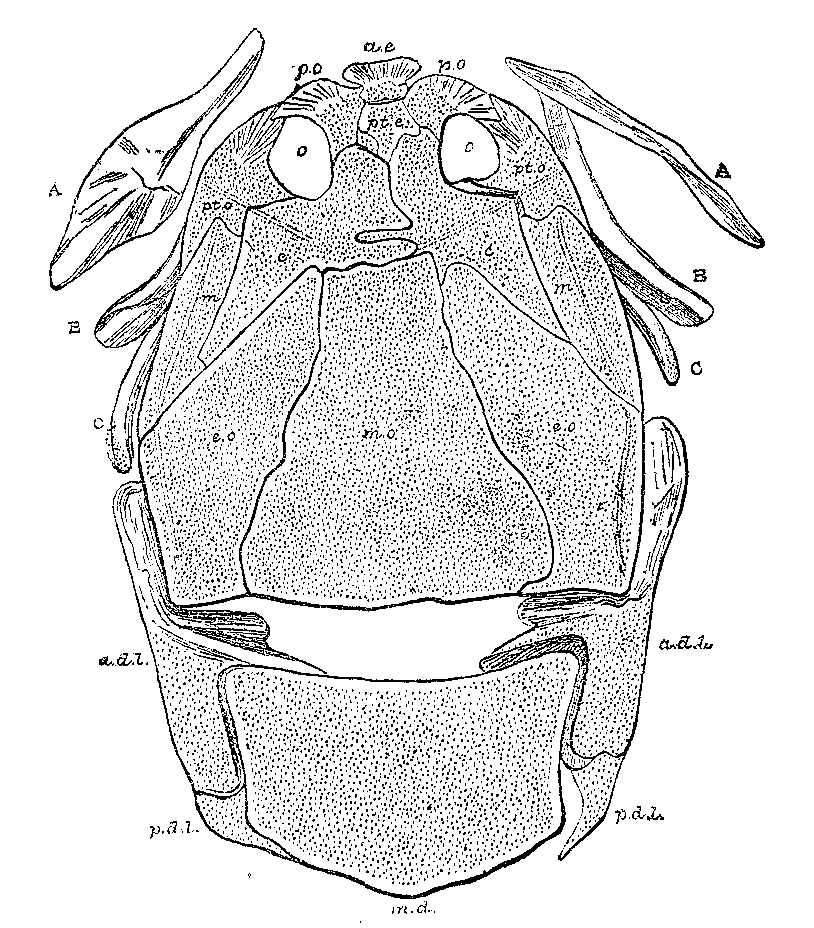
Illustration of H. milleri armour

Homosteus specimens from the Old Red Sandstone of Scotland are known to be significantly radioactive, on the order of 1.2 * 10^{4} gamma/min/g [sic]. Notably, Homosteus specimens are the only fish fossils from the Old Red Sandstone to show significant radioactivity. This suggests that these specimens became radioactive from the animals ingesting radioactive isotopes in life (e.g., through ingesting radioactive sediment), rather than radioactive isotopes being absorbed by the bones during fossilization (as in most cases of radioactive fossils). Individuals of Homosteus from the Old Red Sandstone were chronically exposed to enough radiation that these animals would be expected to suffer negative effects of radiation exposure. However, no specimen of Homosteus shows any sign of bone cancer or other radiation-induced pathologies.
