= Pararhenanoperca =

Pararhenanoperca Temporal range: Middle Eocene

Scientific classification
- Domain: Eukaryota
- Kingdom: Animalia
- Phylum: Chordata
- Class: Actinopterygii
- Order: Perciformes
- Genus: †Pararhenanoperca; Micklich & Wuttke, 1988

Extinct genus of fishes

Pararhenanoperca is an extinct genus of prehistoric bony fish that lived during the middle division of the Eocene epoch.

== See also ==
- Prehistoric fish
- List of prehistoric bony fish
