= Seefeldia =

Scientific classification
- Kingdom: Animalia
- Phylum: Chordata
- Class: Actinopterygii
- Genus: †Seefeldia; Nybelin, 1974

Extinct genus of fishes

Seefeldia is an extinct genus of prehistoric ray-finned fish belonging to the infraclass Teleostei.

== See also ==
- Prehistoric fish
- List of prehistoric bony fish
