= Paractichthys =

Scientific classification
- Domain: Eukaryota
- Kingdom: Animalia
- Phylum: Chordata
- Clade: Osteichthyes
- Genus: †Paractichthys; Dunkle, 1958

Synonyms
- †Paratichthys Dunkle, 1958

Extinct genus of fishes

Paractichthys is an extinct genus of prehistoric bony fish.

== See also ==
- Prehistoric fish
- List of prehistoric bony fish
