= List of prehistoric bony fish genera =

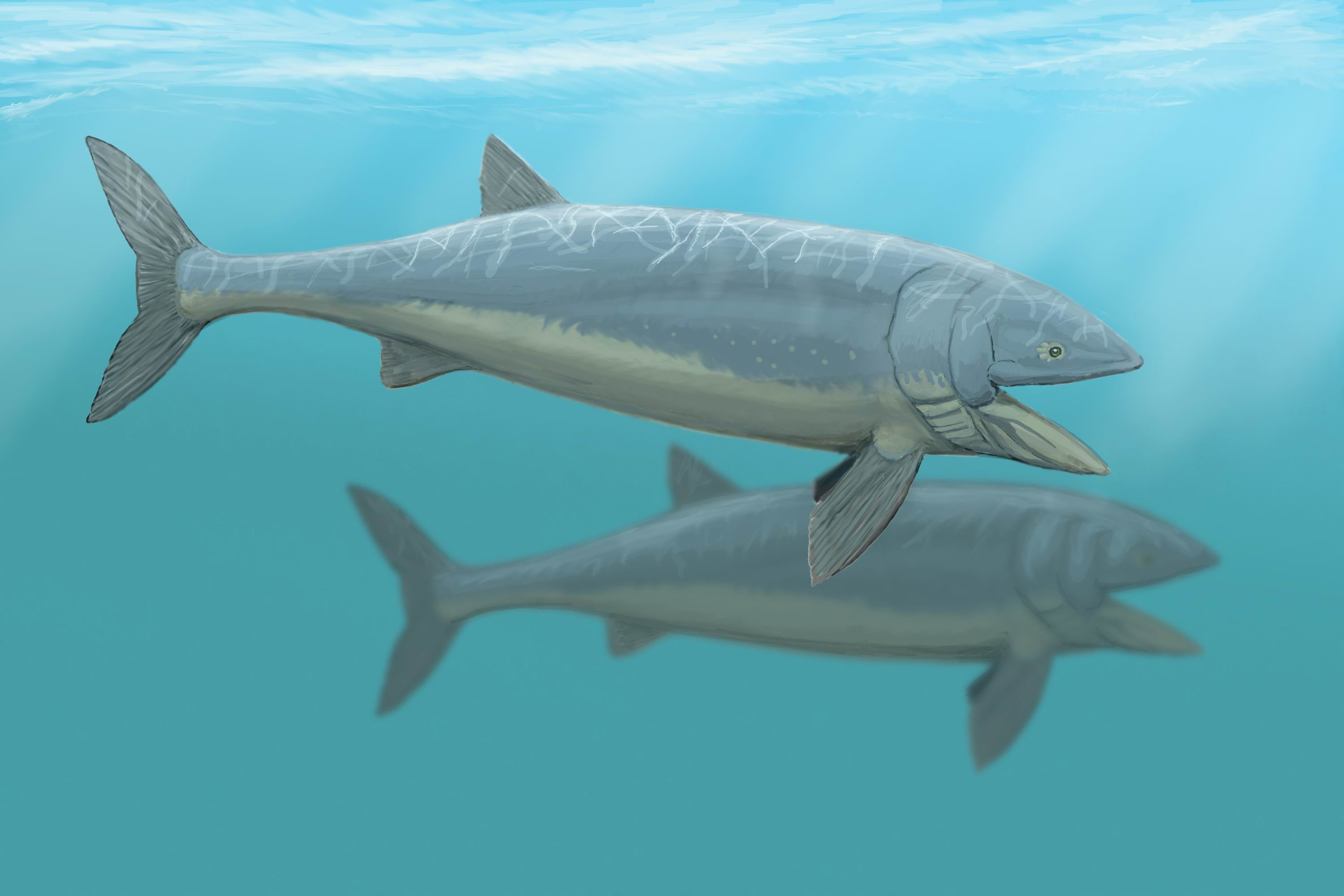
Leedsichthys, a giant Jurassic pachycormid

This list of prehistoric bony fish is an attempt to create a comprehensive listing of all genera from the fossil record that have ever been considered to be bony fish (class Osteichthyes), excluding purely vernacular terms. The list includes all commonly accepted genera, but also genera that are now considered invalid, doubtful (nomina dubia), or were not formally published (nomina nuda), as well as junior synonyms of more established names, and genera that are no longer considered members of osteichthyes.

This list includes 1,387 generic names.

- Extinct genera are marked with a dagger (†).
- Extant genera are **bolded**.

== Naming conventions and terminology ==
Naming conventions and terminology follow the International Code of Zoological Nomenclature. Technical terms used include:

- Junior synonym: A name which describes the same taxon as a previously published name. If two or more genera are formally designated and the type specimens are later assigned to the same genus, the first to be published (in chronological order) is the senior synonym, and all other instances are junior synonyms. Senior synonyms are generally used, except by special decision of the ICZN, but junior synonyms cannot be used again, even if deprecated. Junior synonymy is often subjective, unless the genera described were both based on the same type specimen.
- **Nomen nudum** (Latin for "naked name"): A name that has appeared in print but has not yet been formally published by the standards of the ICZN. Nomina nuda (the plural form) are invalid, and are therefore not italicized as a proper generic name would be. If the name is later formally published, that name is no longer a nomen nudum and will be italicized on this list. Often, the formally published name will differ from any nomina nuda that describe the same specimen.
- **Nomen oblitum** (Latin for "forgotten name"): A name that has not been used in the scientific community for more than fifty years after its original proposal.
- Preoccupied name: A name that is formally published, but which has already been used for another taxon. This second use is invalid (as are all subsequent uses) and the name must be replaced. As preoccupied names are not valid generic names, they will also go unitalicized on this list.
- **Nomen dubium** (Latin for "dubious name"): A name describing a fossil with no unique diagnostic features. As this can be an extremely subjective and controversial designation, this term is not used on this list.

== A ==
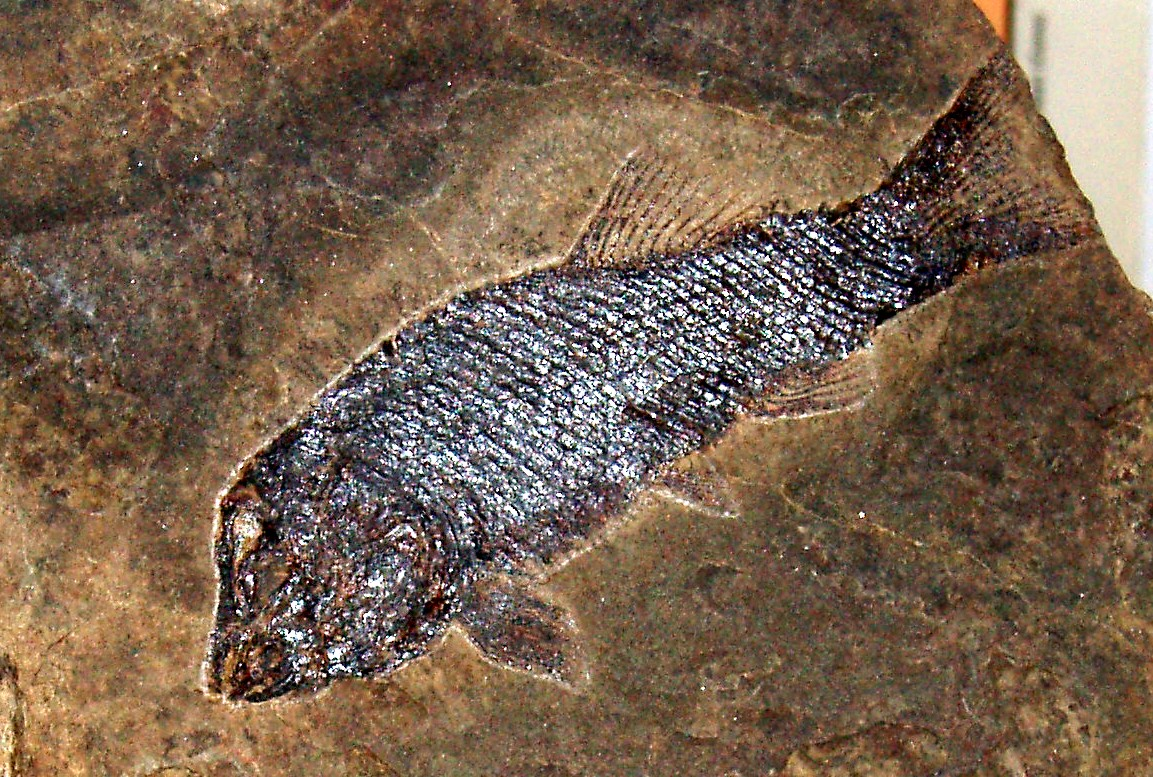
Aetheodontus besanensis

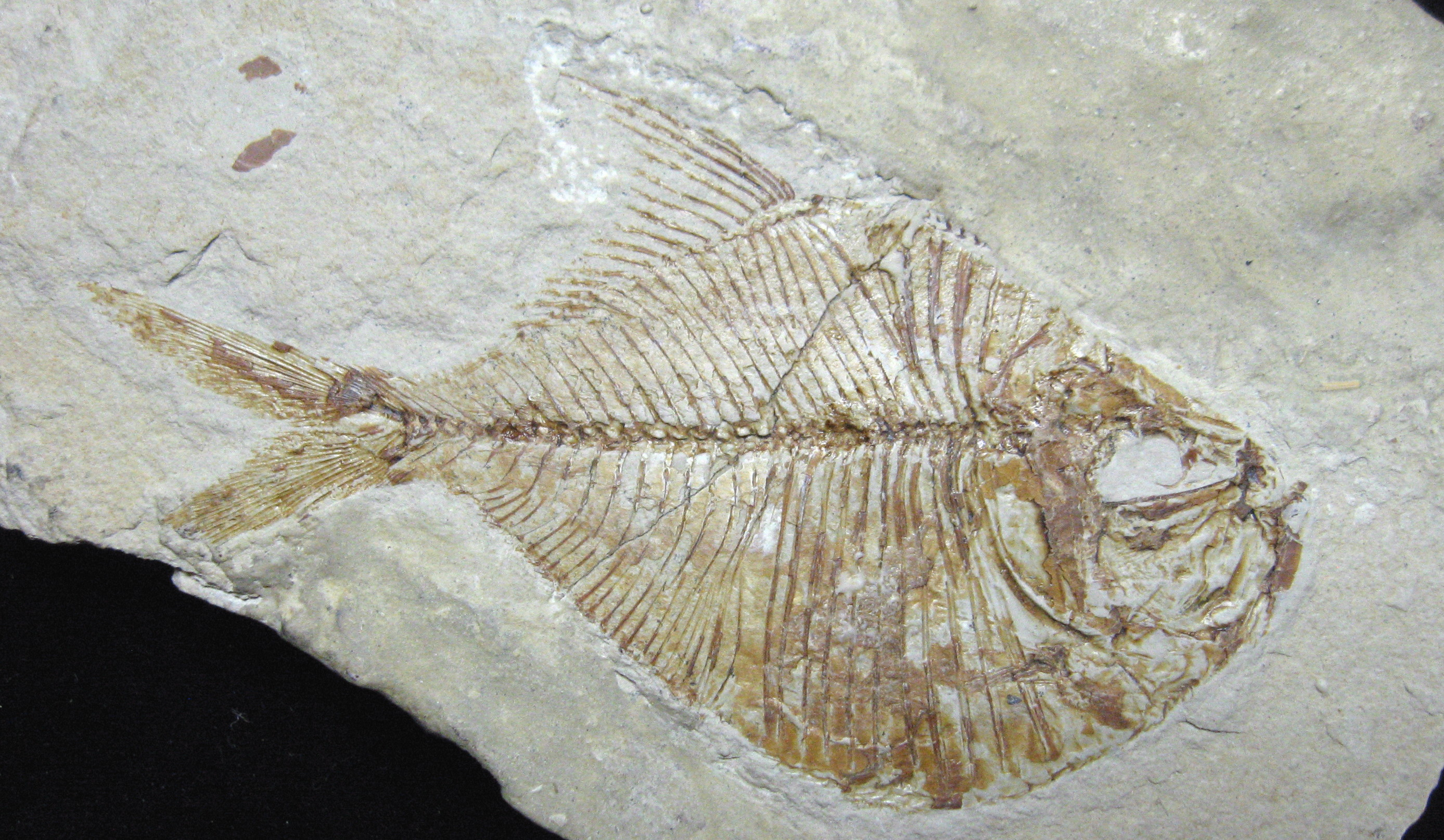
Aipichthys velifer

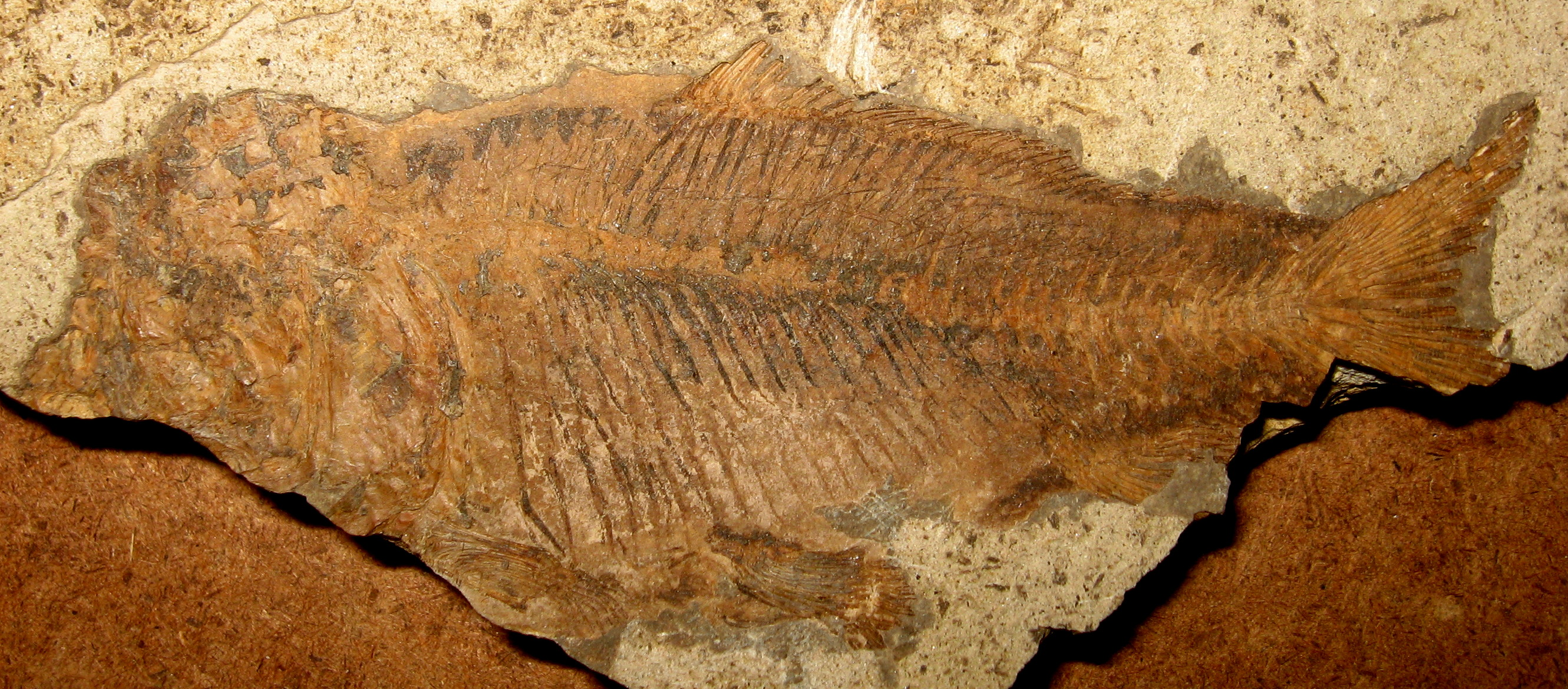
Amyzon aggregatum

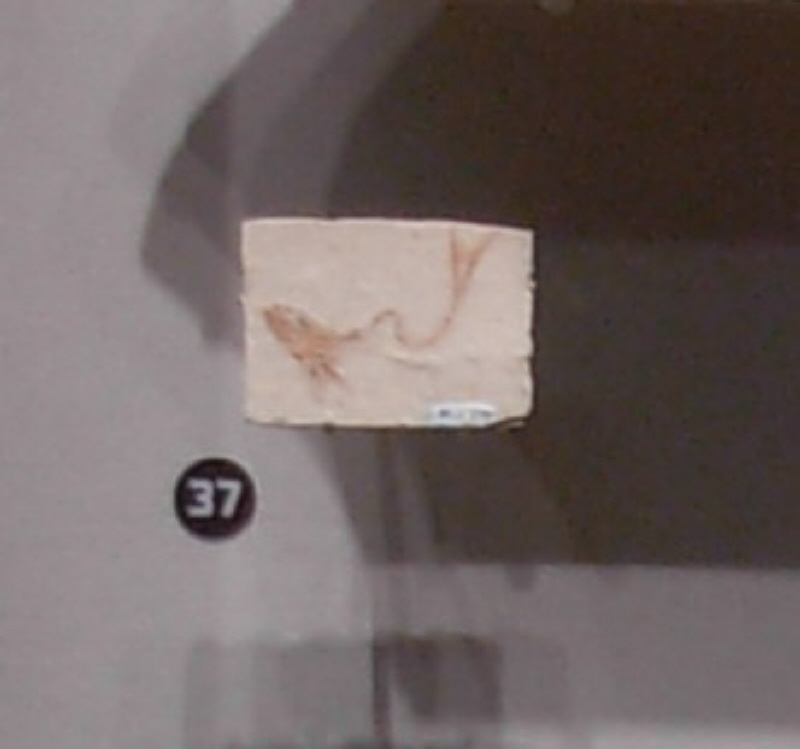
Anaethalion knorri

- †Abadzekhia^{[Sepkoski 2002]}
- ✝Absalomichthys^{[Sepkoski 2002]}
- †Absalomichthys
- †**Acanthognathus**^{[Sepkoski 2002]}
- †Acanthonemus^{[Sepkoski 2002]}
- **Acanthonotus**^{[Sepkoski 2002]}
- †Acanthopleurus^{[Sepkoski 2002]}
- †Acanthopygaeus^{[Sepkoski 2002]}
- **Acanthurus**^{[Sepkoski 2002]}
- **Acentrogobius**^{[Sepkoski 2002]}
- †Acentrophorus^{[Sepkoski 2002]}
- †Acestrus^{[Sepkoski 2002]}
- **Achiurus**^{[Sepkoski 2002]}
- †Achoania
- †Achrestogrammus^{[Sepkoski 2002]}
- **Acipenser**^{[Sepkoski 2002]}
- †Acrogaster^{[Sepkoski 2002]}
- †Acrognathus^{[Sepkoski 2002]}
- †Acrolepis^{[Sepkoski 2002]}
- **Acropoma**^{[Sepkoski 2002]}
- †Acrotemnus^{[Sepkoski 2002]}
- †Adriacentrus^{[Sepkoski 2002]}
- †Aeduella
- ✝Aedulla^{[Sepkoski 2002]}
- †Aegicephalichthys^{[Sepkoski 2002]}
- †Aeoliscoides^{[Sepkoski 2002]}
- **Aeoliscus**^{[Sepkoski 2002]}
- †Aethalionopsis^{[Sepkoski 2002]}
- †Aetheodontus^{[Sepkoski 2002]}
- †Aetheolepis^{[Sepkoski 2002]}
- †Aetheretmon^{[Sepkoski 2002]}
- †Africentrum^{[Sepkoski 2002]}
- †Aglyptorhynchus^{[Sepkoski 2002]}
- **Agonus**^{[Sepkoski 2002]}
- †Ainia
- †Aipichthyoides^{[Sepkoski 2002]}
- †Aipichthys^{[Sepkoski 2002]}
- †Albertonia
- **Albula**^{[Sepkoski 2002]}
- †Alcoveria^{[Sepkoski 2002]}
- **Alectis**^{[Sepkoski 2002]}
- **Alepes**^{[Sepkoski 2002]}
- **Alepisaurus**^{[Sepkoski 2002]}
- †Alisea^{[Sepkoski 2002]}
- †Alleiolepis^{[Sepkoski 2002]}
- †Allelepidotus^{[Sepkoski 2002]}
- †Allenypterus^{[Sepkoski 2002]}
- †Alloberyx^{[Sepkoski 2002]}
- †Allolepidotus^{[Sepkoski 2002]}
- †Allomorone
- **Allosmerus**^{[Sepkoski 2002]}
- †Allothrissops^{[Sepkoski 2002]}
- **Alosa**^{[Sepkoski 2002]}
- **Alutera**^{[Sepkoski 2002]}
- ✝Aluvarus^{[Sepkoski 2002]}
- †Aluvarus
- **Amanses**^{[Sepkoski 2002]}
- †Amblypterina^{[Sepkoski 2002]}
- †Amblypterus^{[Sepkoski 2002]}
- †Amiopsis^{[Sepkoski 2002]}
- **Ammodytes**^{[Sepkoski 2002]}
- †Ampheristus^{[Sepkoski 2002]}
- †Amphiperca^{[Sepkoski 2002]}
- **Amphistichus**^{[Sepkoski 2002]}
- †Amphistium^{[Sepkoski 2002]}
- †Amyzon
- †Anaethalion^{[Sepkoski 2002]}
- †Analectis^{[Sepkoski 2002]}
- **Anarhichas**^{[Sepkoski 2002]}
- **Anarrhichthys**^{[Sepkoski 2002]}
- **Anchoa**^{[Sepkoski 2002]}
- †Andreolepis^{[Sepkoski 2002]}
- †Angatubichthys
- †Angolaichthys
- **Anguilla**^{[Sepkoski 2002]}
- †Anguillavus^{[Sepkoski 2002]}
- †Anguilloides^{[Sepkoski 2002]}
- **Anisotremus**^{[Sepkoski 2002]}
- †Ankylophorus^{[Sepkoski 2002]}
- †Annaichthys
- †Anomoeodus^{[Sepkoski 2002]}
- **Antennarius**^{[Sepkoski 2002]}
- **Antigonia**^{[Sepkoski 2002]}
- †Antofagastaichthys
- ✝Antofastaichthys^{[Sepkoski 2002]}
- †Apateodus^{[Sepkoski 2002]}
- †Apateolepis
- †Apateopholis^{[Sepkoski 2002]}
- †Aphanepygus^{[Sepkoski 2002]}
- †Aphelolepis^{[Sepkoski 2002]}
- **Aphia**^{[Sepkoski 2002]}
- †Aphnelepis^{[Sepkoski 2002]}
- **Aplodinotus**^{[Sepkoski 2002]}
- **Apogon**^{[Sepkoski 2002]}
- †Apogonoides^{[Sepkoski 2002]}
- **Apolectus**^{[Sepkoski 2002]}
- **Apsilus**^{[Sepkoski 2002]}
- †Apsopelix^{[Sepkoski 2002]}
- **Aracana**^{[Sepkoski 2002]}
- **Araeosteus**^{[Sepkoski 2002]}
- †Aramichthys^{[Sepkoski 2002]}
- †Araripichthys^{[Sepkoski 2002]}
- †Archaeolepidotus^{[Sepkoski 2002]}
- †Archaeomaene^{[Sepkoski 2002]}
- †Archaeosemionotus
- †Archaephippus^{[Sepkoski 2002]}
- †Archaeus^{[Sepkoski 2002]}
- †Arctosomus^{[Sepkoski 2002]}
- †Ardiodus^{[Sepkoski 2002]}
- †Ardoreosomus
- **Argentina**^{[Sepkoski 2002]}
- †Argillichthys^{[Sepkoski 2002]}
- †Argilloberyx^{[Sepkoski 2002]}
- **Argyripnus**^{[Sepkoski 2002]}
- **Argyropelecus**^{[Sepkoski 2002]}
- **Argyrosomus**^{[Sepkoski 2002]}
- **Ariomma**^{[Sepkoski 2002]}
- **Ariosoma**^{[Sepkoski 2002]}
- **Arius**^{[Sepkoski 2002]}
- **Arnoglossus**^{[Sepkoski 2002]}
- †Arratiaichthys
- **Artedius**^{[Sepkoski 2002]}
- †Asarotus^{[Sepkoski 2002]}
- †Ascalobos^{[Sepkoski 2002]}
- †Asialepidotus^{[Sepkoski 2002]}
- †Asima^{[Sepkoski 2002]}
- †Asineops^{[Sepkoski 2002]}
- †Aspidorhynchus^{[Sepkoski 2002]}
- †Asthenocormus^{[Sepkoski 2002]}
- **Astronesthes**^{[Sepkoski 2002]}
- †Atacamichthys
- ✝Atacamichthyss^{[Sepkoski 2002]}
- **Ateleopus**^{[Sepkoski 2002]}
- **Atheresthes**^{[Sepkoski 2002]}
- **Atherina**^{[Sepkoski 2002]}
- **Atherinopsis**^{[Sepkoski 2002]}
- †Athrodon^{[Sepkoski 2002]}
- †Atopocephala^{[Sepkoski 2002]}
- †Aulolepis^{[Sepkoski 2002]}
- †Aulopopsis^{[Sepkoski 2002]}
- **Aulopus**^{[Sepkoski 2002]}
- †Aulorhamphus^{[Sepkoski 2002]}
- **Aulorhynchus**^{[Sepkoski 2002]}
- †Aulostomoides^{[Sepkoski 2002]}
- **Aulostomus**^{[Sepkoski 2002]}
- †Australosomus^{[Sepkoski 2002]}
- †Austroclupea^{[Sepkoski 2002]}
- †Austrolepidotus^{[Sepkoski 2002]}
- **Austrophycis**^{[Sepkoski 2002]}
- †Austropleuropholis^{[Sepkoski 2002]}
- †Avitolabrax^{[Sepkoski 2002]}
- †Avitoluvarus^{[Sepkoski 2002]}
- †Axelia^{[Sepkoski 2002]}
- †Axelrodichthys

== B ==
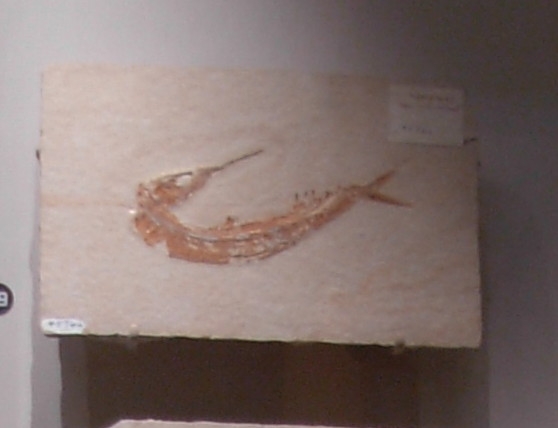
Belonostomus sp.

- **Bairdiella**^{[Sepkoski 2002]}
- †Bajaichthys^{[Sepkoski 2002]}
- †Baleiichthys^{[Sepkoski 2002]}
- **Balistes**^{[Sepkoski 2002]}
- †Balistomorphus^{[Sepkoski 2002]}
- †Bananogmius^{[Sepkoski 2002]}
- †Barcarenichthyes^{[Sepkoski 2002]}
- **Bassozetus**^{[Sepkoski 2002]}
- **Bathyclupea**^{[Sepkoski 2002]}
- **Bathygadus**^{[Sepkoski 2002]}
- †Bathylagus (extance disputed^{[Sepkoski 2002]})
- †Bathysoma^{[Sepkoski 2002]}
- **Batrachoides**^{[Sepkoski 2002]}
- †Bawitius
- †Beagiascus
- †Beaumontoperca^{[Sepkoski 2002]}
- †Beerichthys^{[Sepkoski 2002]}
- †Beishanichthys
- †Belichthys
- **Belone**^{[Sepkoski 2002]}
- †Belonostomus^{[Sepkoski 2002]}
- †Beltanodus
- **Bembrops**^{[Sepkoski 2002]}
- †Bendenius^{[Sepkoski 2002]}
- **Benthocomectes**^{[Sepkoski 2002]}
- **Benthosema**^{[Sepkoski 2002]}
- †Berybolcensis^{[Sepkoski 2002]}
- †Berycomorus^{[Sepkoski 2002]}
- †Berycopsia^{[Sepkoski 2002]}
- †Berycopsis^{[Sepkoski 2002]}
- **Beryx**^{[Sepkoski 2002]}
- †Besania^{[Sepkoski 2002]}
- †Bethesdaichthys
- †Bilinia^{[Sepkoski 2002]}
- †Birgeria^{[Sepkoski 2002]}
- †Blabe^{[Sepkoski 2002]}
- **Blennius**^{[Sepkoski 2002]}
- †Blochius^{[Sepkoski 2002]}
- †Blourugia
- †Bluefieldius
- †Bobasatrania^{[Sepkoski 2002]}
- †Bobbichthys^{[Sepkoski 2002]}
- **Bodianus**^{[Sepkoski 2002]}
- †Bolbocara^{[Sepkoski 2002]}
- †Bolcanguilla^{[Sepkoski 2002]}
- †Bolcyrus^{[Sepkoski 2002]}
- †Bolinichthyes (extance disputed^{[Sepkoski 2002]})
- †Bonnerichthys
- **Boops**^{[Sepkoski 2002]}
- †Boreichthys^{[Sepkoski 2002]}
- †Boreolepis^{[Sepkoski 2002]}
- †Boreosomus^{[Sepkoski 2002]}
- ✝Borichthys^{[Sepkoski 2002]}
- **Bothus**^{[Sepkoski 2002]}
- †Bourbonnella
- **Brachionichthys**^{[Sepkoski 2002]}
- †Brachydegma
- **Brachydeuterus**^{[Sepkoski 2002]}
- †Brachypareion^{[Sepkoski 2002]}
- **Brama**^{[Sepkoski 2002]}
- †Bramoides^{[Sepkoski 2002]}
- **Branchiostegus**^{[Sepkoski 2002]}
- †Brannerion^{[Sepkoski 2002]}
- †Brazilichthys
- †Bregmacerinia^{[Sepkoski 2002]}
- **Bregmaceros**^{[Sepkoski 2002]}
- †Brembodus^{[Sepkoski 2002]}
- †Brookvalia
- ✝Broovalia^{[Sepkoski 2002]}
- **Brosme**^{[Sepkoski 2002]}
- **Brosmius**^{[Sepkoski 2002]}
- **Brotula**^{[Sepkoski 2002]}
- †Broughia^{[Sepkoski 2002]}
- †Broweria^{[Sepkoski 2002]}
- †Browneichthys^{[Sepkoski 2002]}
- †Brychaetus^{[Sepkoski 2002]}
- **Buglossidium**^{[Sepkoski 2002]}
- †Bullichthys
- ✝Burbonella^{[Sepkoski 2002]}
- †Burguklia
- †Burtinia^{[Sepkoski 2002]}

== C ==
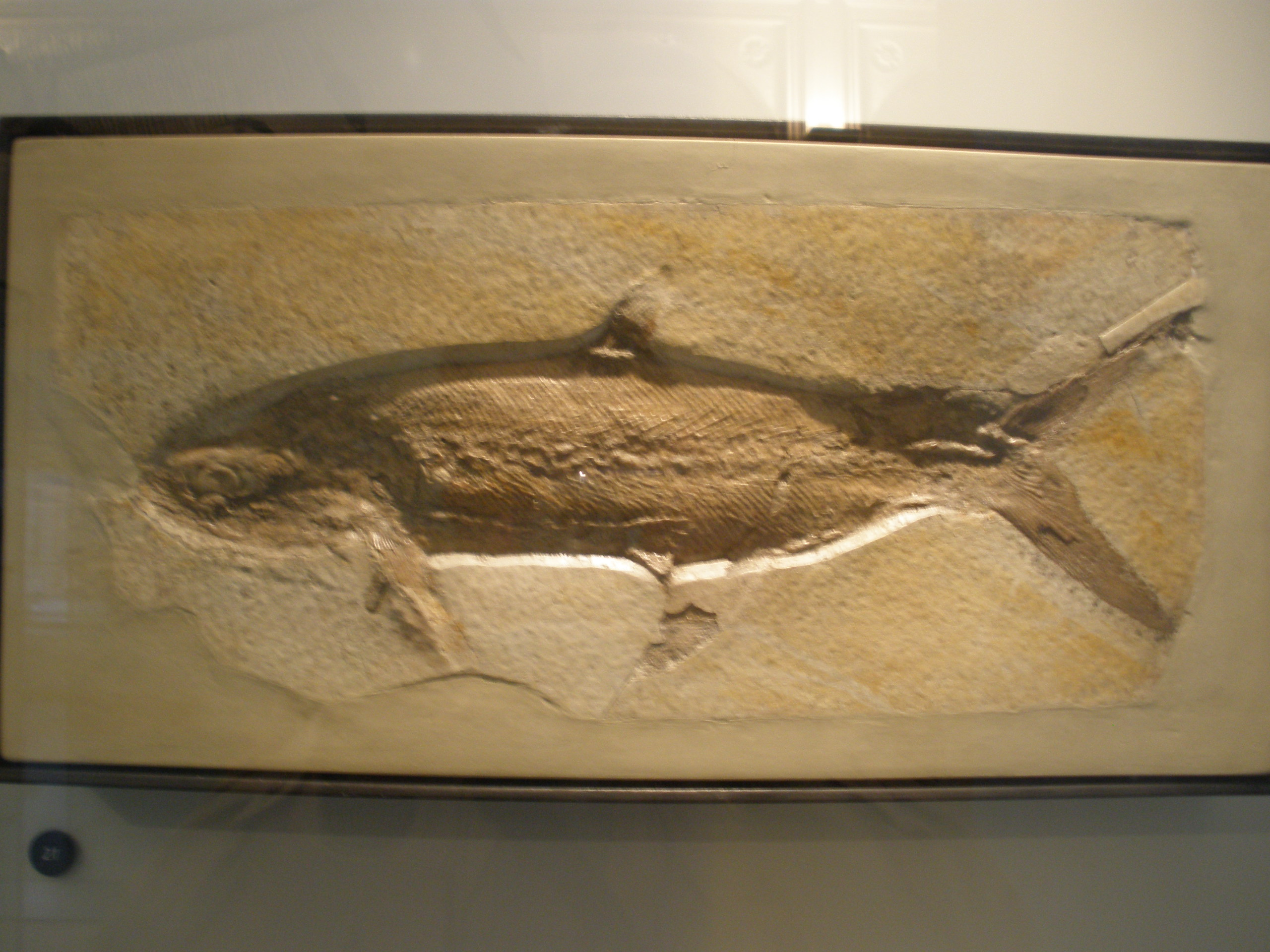
Caturus velifer

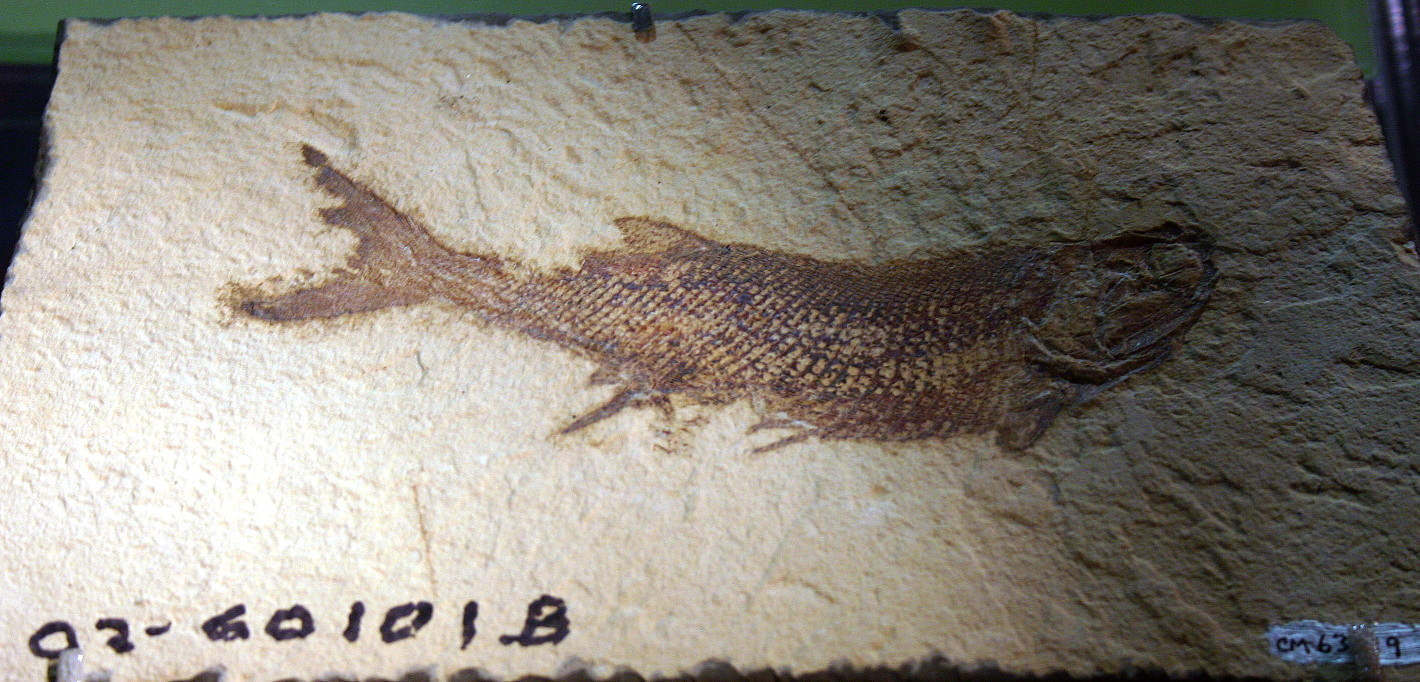
Cyranorhis bergeraci

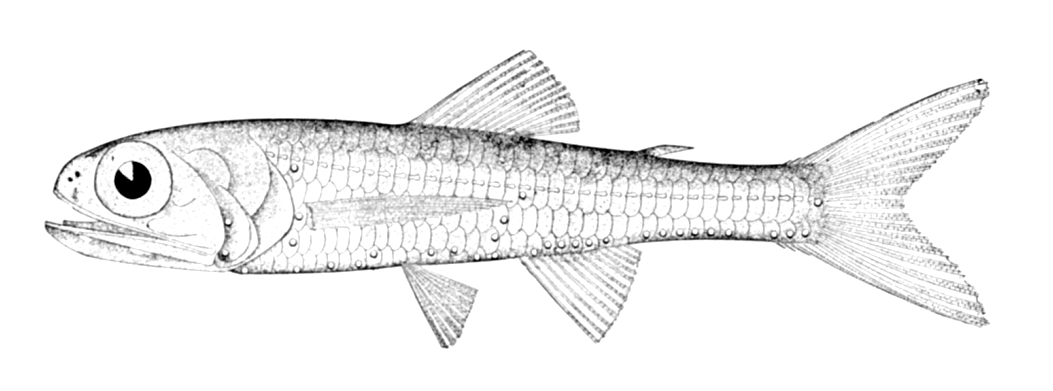
The lantern fish Ceratoscopelus maderensis is a modern representative of a prehistoric genus

- **Caesio**^{[Sepkoski 2002]}
- †Caeus^{[Sepkoski 2002]}
- †Calamopleurus
- †Calamostoma^{[Sepkoski 2002]}
- **Calamus**^{[Sepkoski 2002]}
- **Callionymus**^{[Sepkoski 2002]}
- †Callipteryx^{[Sepkoski 2002]}
- †Callipurbeckia
- ✝Callopterus^{[Sepkoski 2002]}
- ✝Callopteus^{[Sepkoski 2002]}
- **Callyodon**^{[Sepkoski 2002]}
- **Calotomus** (extance disputed^{[Sepkoski 2002]})
- †Candelarialepis
- †Canningius^{[Sepkoski 2002]}
- †Canobius^{[Sepkoski 2002]}
- †Caproberyx^{[Sepkoski 2002]}
- **Capros**^{[Sepkoski 2002]}
- †Caprovesposus^{[Sepkoski 2002]}
- †Carangodes^{[Sepkoski 2002]}
- †Carangopsis^{[Sepkoski 2002]}
- **Caranx**^{[Sepkoski 2002]}
- **Carapus**^{[Sepkoski 2002]}
- †Caridosuctor^{[Sepkoski 2002]}
- †Carpathichthys^{[Sepkoski 2002]}
- †Carsothrissops^{[Sepkoski 2002]}
- †Caruichthys^{[Sepkoski 2002]}
- †Casierius^{[Sepkoski 2002]}
- †Casieroides^{[Sepkoski 2002]}
- †Caturus^{[Sepkoski 2002]}
- †Cavenderichthys
- **Centracanthus**^{[Sepkoski 2002]}
- **Centriscus**^{[Sepkoski 2002]}
- **Centroberyx**^{[Sepkoski 2002]}
- ✝Centrolepis^{[Sepkoski 2002]}
- **Centropomus**^{[Sepkoski 2002]}
- **Centropristis**^{[Sepkoski 2002]}
- †Cephaloxenus^{[Sepkoski 2002]}
- **Cepola**^{[Sepkoski 2002]}
- †Ceramurus^{[Sepkoski 2002]}
- ✝Ceratoichthyes^{[Sepkoski 2002]}
- †Ceratoichthys
- **Ceratoscopelus**^{[Sepkoski 2002]}
- **Chaetodon**^{[Sepkoski 2002]}
- **Chaeturichthys**^{[Sepkoski 2002]}
- †Chagrinia^{[Sepkoski 2002]}
- †Chalcidichthys^{[Sepkoski 2002]}
- †Challaia
- **Chanda**^{[Sepkoski 2002]}
- **Chanda (fish)**
- †Changxingia^{[Sepkoski 2002]}
- †Chanopsis^{[Sepkoski 2002]}
- **Chanos**^{[Sepkoski 2002]}
- †Chardonius^{[Sepkoski 2002]}
- †Charitopsis^{[Sepkoski 2002]}
- †Charitosomus^{[Sepkoski 2002]}
- †Charleuxia^{[Sepkoski 2002]}
- **Chauliodus**^{[Sepkoski 2002]}
- †Chaunax (extance disputed^{[Sepkoski 2002]})
- **Cheilinus**^{[Sepkoski 2002]}
- †Cheirodopsis^{[Sepkoski 2002]}
- †Cheirolepis
- †Cheirothrix^{[Sepkoski 2002]}
- **Chelmon**^{[Sepkoski 2002]}
- †Chibapsetta^{[Sepkoski 2002]}
- †Chichia^{[Sepkoski 2002]}
- **Chilara**^{[Sepkoski 2002]}
- **Chilomycterus**^{[Sepkoski 2002]}
- †Chirocentrites^{[Sepkoski 2002]}
- **Chirocentrus**^{[Sepkoski 2002]}
- †Chirodipterus^{[Sepkoski 2002]}
- **Chirostoma**^{[Sepkoski 2002]}
- ✝Cheirothrix^{[Sepkoski 2002]}
- **Chitonotus**^{[Sepkoski 2002]}
- **Chlorophthalmus**^{[Sepkoski 2002]}
- †Chondrosteus^{[Sepkoski 2002]}
- †Chongichthys^{[Sepkoski 2002]}
- **Chromis**^{[Sepkoski 2002]}
- †Chrotichthys^{[Sepkoski 2002]}
- †Chrysolepis^{[Sepkoski 2002]}
- ✝Chungkingichthyes^{[Sepkoski 2002]}
- †Chungkingichthys
- †Chuhsiungichthys
- †Cimolichthys^{[Sepkoski 2002]}
- †Cipactlichthys
- **Citharichthys**^{[Sepkoski 2002]}
- **Citharus**^{[Sepkoski 2002]}
- †Cladocyclus^{[Sepkoski 2002]}
- †Cleithrolepis^{[Sepkoski 2002]}
- **Clidoderma**^{[Sepkoski 2002]}
- **Clinus**^{[Sepkoski 2002]}
- †Clupavus^{[Sepkoski 2002]}
- **Clupea**^{[Sepkoski 2002]}
- **Cobitopsis**^{[Sepkoski 2002]}
- †Coccocephalichthys^{[Sepkoski 2002]}
- †Coccoderma^{[Sepkoski 2002]}
- †Coccodus^{[Sepkoski 2002]}
- †Coccolepis^{[Sepkoski 2002]}
- †Coelacanthopsis^{[Sepkoski 2002]}
- †Coelacanthus^{[Sepkoski 2002]}
- †Coelodus^{[Sepkoski 2002]}
- †Coelogaster^{[Sepkoski 2002]}
- **Coelorhynchus**^{[Sepkoski 2002]}
- †Colobodus^{[Sepkoski 2002]}
- **Colpichthyes**^{[Sepkoski 2002]}
- **Colpichthys**
- †Concavotectum
- †Concentrilepis
- †Conchodus^{[Sepkoski 2002]}
- **Conger**^{[Sepkoski 2002]}
- †Congorhynchus^{[Sepkoski 2002]}
- †Cooyoo
- †Coriops ^{[Sepkoski 2002]}
- †Cornuboniscus^{[Sepkoski 2002]}
- †Corunegenys^{[Sepkoski 2002]}
- **Coryphaenoides**^{[Sepkoski 2002]}
- †Coryphaenopsis^{[Sepkoski 2002]}
- **Coryphopterus**^{[Sepkoski 2002]}
- †Cosmolepis^{[Sepkoski 2002]}
- †Cosmoptychius^{[Sepkoski 2002]}
- **Cottopsis**^{[Sepkoski 2002]}
- **Crenidens**^{[Sepkoski 2002]}
- †Crenilepis
- ✝Crenolepis^{[Sepkoski 2002]}
- †Cretatriacanthus^{[Sepkoski 2002]}
- †Cretazeus
- †Cristigerina^{[Sepkoski 2002]}
- †Crossognathus^{[Sepkoski 2002]}
- †Crossopholis
- †Cryptobalistes^{[Sepkoski 2002]}
- †Cryptoberyx^{[Sepkoski 2002]}
- †Cryptolepis^{[Sepkoski 2002]}
- **Ctenoberyx**^{[Sepkoski 2002]}
- †Ctenocephalichthys^{[Sepkoski 2002]}
- †Ctenodentex^{[Sepkoski 2002]}
- †Ctenognathichthys^{[Sepkoski 2002]}
- †Ctenopomichthys^{[Sepkoski 2002]}
- **Ctenosciaena**^{[Sepkoski 2002]}
- †Ctenothrissa^{[Sepkoski 2002]}
- †Cualabaea^{[Sepkoski 2002]}
- **Cubiceps**^{[Sepkoski 2002]}
- †Cuneatus
- †Cyclopoma^{[Sepkoski 2002]}
- **Cyclopterus**^{[Sepkoski 2002]}
- †Cycloptychius^{[Sepkoski 2002]}
- **Cyclothone**^{[Sepkoski 2002]}
- †Cyclurus
- †Cylindracanthus^{[Sepkoski 2002]}
- †Cylindrichthys
- **Cymatogaster**^{[Sepkoski 2002]}
- **Cynoscion**^{[Sepkoski 2002]}
- †Cyranichthys^{[Sepkoski 2002]}
- †Cyranorhis^{[Sepkoski 2002]}
- †Cyttoides^{[Sepkoski 2002]}

== D ==
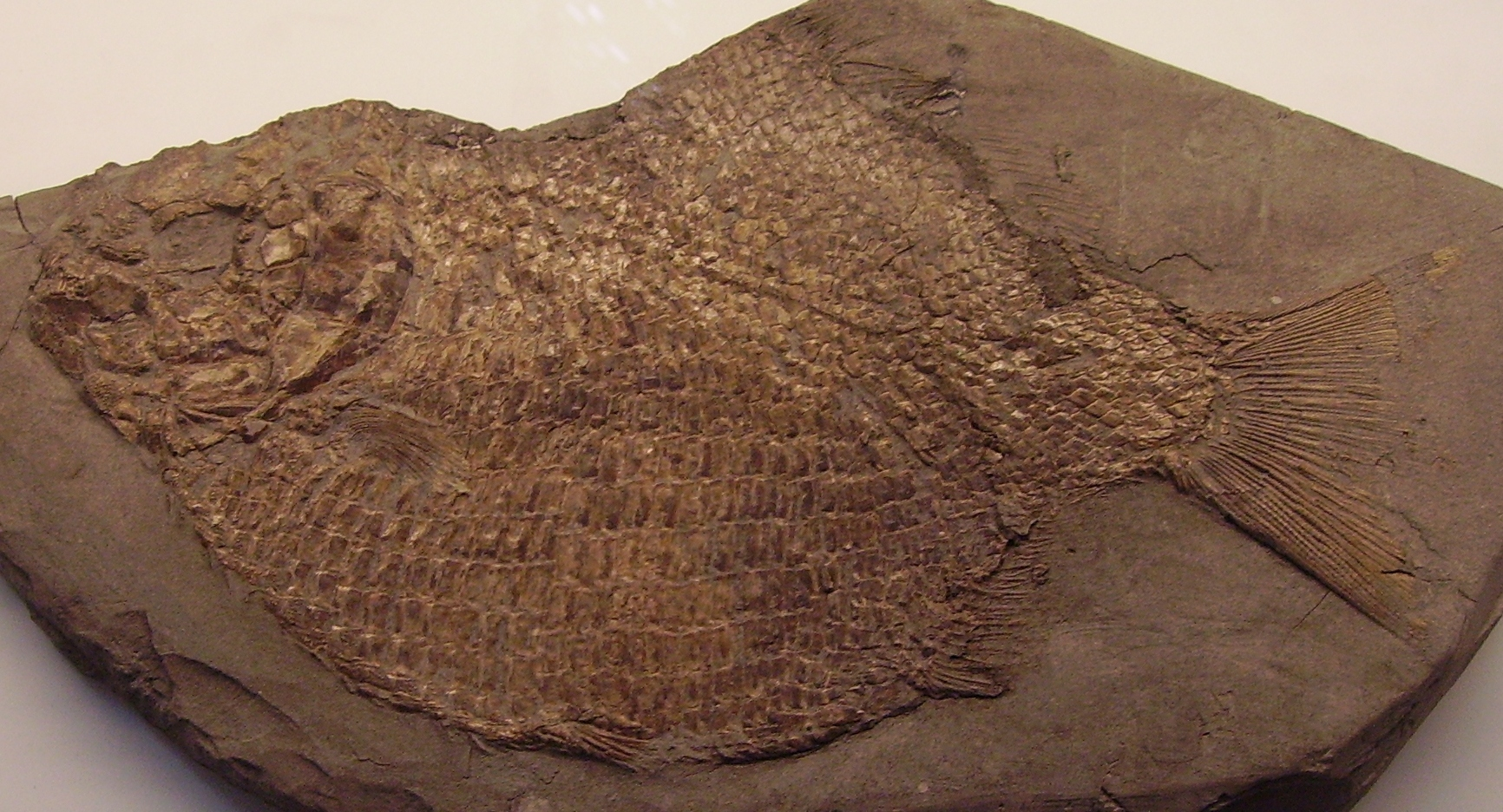
Dapedium politum specimen from Oxford University Museum of Natural History

- †Dactylopogon^{[Sepkoski 2002]}
- **Dactyloptena**^{[Sepkoski 2002]}
- **Dactylopterus**^{[Sepkoski 2002]}
- †Daedalichthys^{[Sepkoski 2002]}
- †Daitingichthys^{[Sepkoski 2002]}
- †Dalmatichthys^{[Sepkoski 2002]}
- †Dalpiazella^{[Sepkoski 2002]}
- **Damalichthys**^{[Sepkoski 2002]}
- **Danaphos**^{[Sepkoski 2002]}
- †Danatinia^{[Sepkoski 2002]}
- †Dandya^{[Sepkoski 2002]}
- **Dannevigia**^{[Sepkoski 2002]}
- †Dapalis^{[Sepkoski 2002]}
- †Dapaloides^{[Sepkoski 2002]}
- †Dapedium^{[Sepkoski 2002]}
- †Daqingshaniscus
- †Dastilbe^{[Sepkoski 2002]}
- †Davichthys^{[Sepkoski 2002]}
- **Decapterus**^{[Sepkoski 2002]}
- †Decazella^{[Sepkoski 2002]}
- **Deltentosteus**^{[Sepkoski 2002]}
- **Dentex**^{[Sepkoski 2002]}
- †Deprandus^{[Sepkoski 2002]}
- †Dercetis^{[Sepkoski 2002]}
- †Dercetoides^{[Sepkoski 2002]}
- **Dermatopsis**^{[Sepkoski 2002]}
- †Devonesteus^{[Sepkoski 2002]}
- †Devonosteus^{[Sepkoski 2002]}
- †Diabolepis^{[Sepkoski 2002]}
- †Dialiipina^{[Sepkoski 2002]}
- **Diaphus**^{[Sepkoski 2002]}
- †Diaphyodus^{[Sepkoski 2002]}
- **Dibranchus**^{[Sepkoski 2002]}
- †Dicellopyge
- **Dicologoglossa**^{[Sepkoski 2002]}
- †Dictyopyge
- ✝Dictyopyge^{[Sepkoski 2002]}
- †Digoria^{[Sepkoski 2002]}
- †Dimorpholepis^{[Sepkoski 2002]}
- †Dinelops^{[Sepkoski 2002]}
- †Dinopteryx^{[Sepkoski 2002]}
- **Diodon**^{[Sepkoski 2002]}
- **Diplacanthopoma**^{[Sepkoski 2002]}
- †Diplocercides^{[Sepkoski 2002]}
- **Diplodus**^{[Sepkoski 2002]}
- †Diplomystus
- †Diplospondichthys
- †Dipnorhynchus^{[Sepkoski 2002]}
- †Dipterichthys^{[Sepkoski 2002]}
- †Dipteronotus^{[Sepkoski 2002]}
- †Dipterus^{[Sepkoski 2002]}
- **Dipulus**^{[Sepkoski 2002]}
- **Diretmus**^{[Sepkoski 2002]}
- †Discordichthys
- †Dollopterus^{[Sepkoski 2002]}
- †Domeykos^{[Sepkoski 2002]}
- †Dorsetichthys
- †Dorsolepis^{[Sepkoski 2002]}
- †Dorypterus
- †Drimys^{[Sepkoski 2002]}
- †Drydenius^{[Sepkoski 2002]}
- †Ductor^{[Sepkoski 2002]}
- †Dwykia^{[Sepkoski 2002]}

== E ==
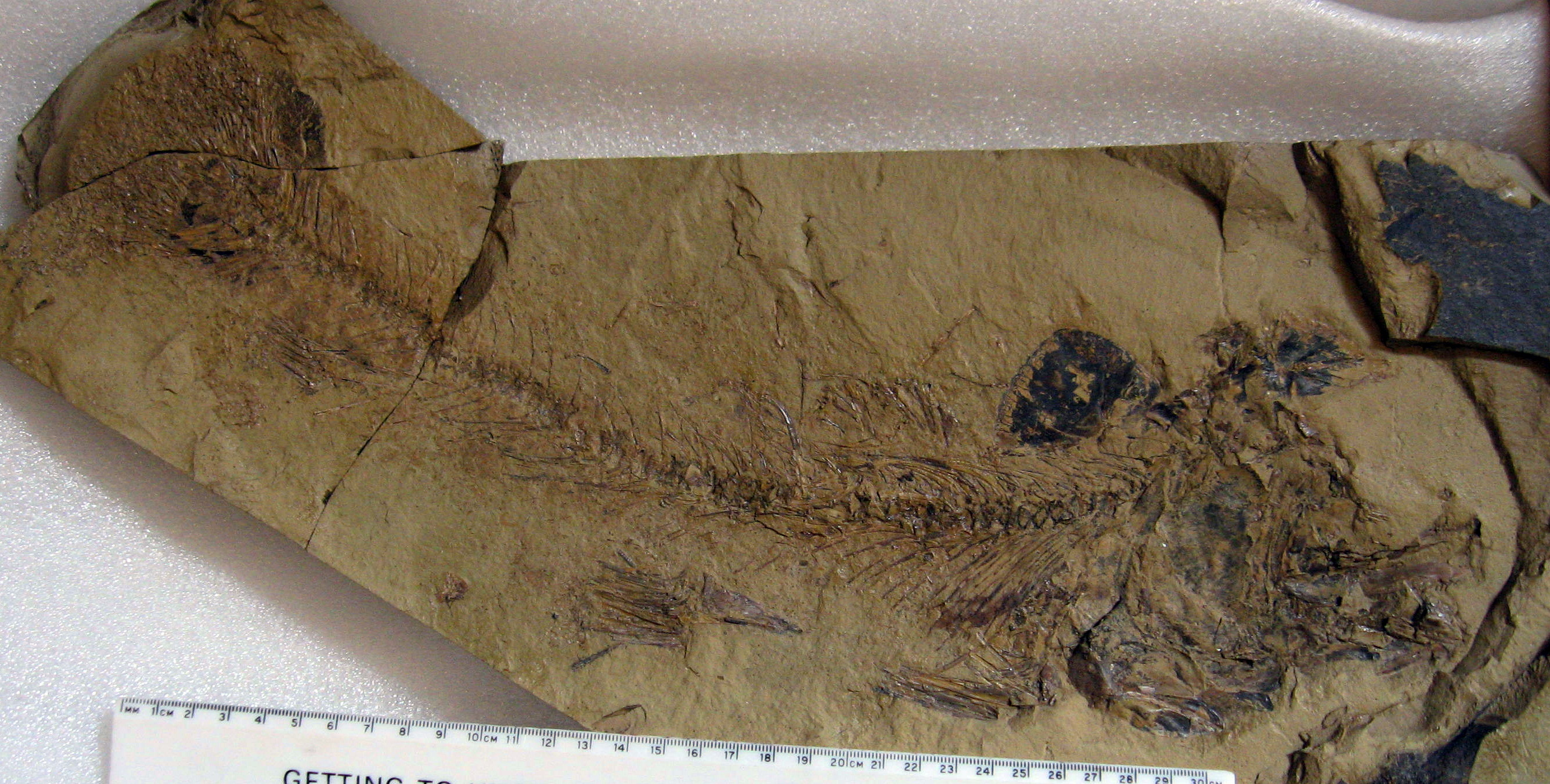
Eosalmo sp.

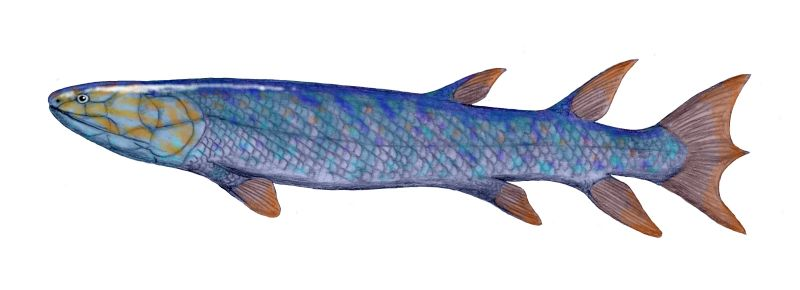
Eusthenopteron

- †Eastmanalepes^{[Sepkoski 2002]}
- †Ebenaqua^{[Sepkoski 2002]}
- **Echelus**^{[Sepkoski 2002]}
- **Echeneis**^{[Sepkoski 2002]}
- **Echeneis (fish)**
- †Echidnocephalus^{[Sepkoski 2002]}
- **Echiodon**^{[Sepkoski 2002]}
- †Eclipes^{[Sepkoski 2002]}
- †Ecrinesomus^{[Sepkoski 2002]}
- †Ectasis^{[Sepkoski 2002]}
- †Ectosteorhachis^{[Sepkoski 2002]}
- †Egertonia^{[Sepkoski 2002]}
- †Eichstaettia^{[Sepkoski 2002]}
- †Eigilia^{[Sepkoski 2002]}
- **Electrona**^{[Sepkoski 2002]}
- †Ellimma
- †Ellimmichthys
- †Elonichthys^{[Sepkoski 2002]}
- †Elopoides^{[Sepkoski 2002]}
- †Elopopsis^{[Sepkoski 2002]}
- **Elops**^{[Sepkoski 2002]}
- †Elpistoichthys^{[Sepkoski 2002]}
- **Emmelichthys**^{[Sepkoski 2002]}
- †Enchelion^{[Sepkoski 2002]}
- †Enchelurus^{[Sepkoski 2002]}
- †Enchelyolepis^{[Sepkoski 2002]}
- †Enchodus^{[Sepkoski 2002]}
- **Engraulis**^{[Sepkoski 2002]}
- †Engycolobodus
- †Enigmatichthys^{[Sepkoski 2002]}
- †Enischnorhynchus
- ✝Enischnorhynchus^{[Sepkoski 2002]}
- †Enniskillenus^{[Sepkoski 2002]}
- **Enophrys**^{[Sepkoski 2002]}
- †Enoplophthalmus^{[Sepkoski 2002]}
- **Enoplosus**^{[Sepkoski 2002]}
- †Eoanguilla^{[Sepkoski 2002]}
- †Eoaulostomus^{[Sepkoski 2002]}
- †Eobothus^{[Sepkoski 2002]}
- †Eobuglossus^{[Sepkoski 2002]}
- †Eochondrosteus
- †Eocoelopoma^{[Sepkoski 2002]}
- †Eocottus^{[Sepkoski 2002]}
- †Eodiaphyodus^{[Sepkoski 2002]}
- †Eodiodon^{[Sepkoski 2002]}
- †Eoeugnathus^{[Sepkoski 2002]}
- †Eoholocentrum^{[Sepkoski 2002]}
- †Eokrefftia^{[Sepkoski 2002]}
- †Eolabroides^{[Sepkoski 2002]}
- †Eolactoria^{[Sepkoski 2002]}
- †Eolamprogrammus^{[Sepkoski 2002]}
- †Eolates^{[Sepkoski 2002]}
- †Eolophotes^{[Sepkoski 2002]}
- †Eoluvarus^{[Sepkoski 2002]}
- †Eomesodon^{[Sepkoski 2002]}
- †Eomuraena^{[Sepkoski 2002]}
- †Eomyctophum^{[Sepkoski 2002]}
- **Eomyrophis**^{[Sepkoski 2002]}
- †Eomyrus^{[Sepkoski 2002]}
- †Eopeyeria^{[Sepkoski 2002]}
- †Eophycis^{[Sepkoski 2002]}
- †Eoplatax^{[Sepkoski 2002]}
- †Eoplectus^{[Sepkoski 2002]}
- †Eoprotelops^{[Sepkoski 2002]}
- **Eopsetta**^{[Sepkoski 2002]}
- †Eosalmo^{[Sepkoski 2002]}
- †Eosaurichthys^{[Sepkoski 2002]}
- †Eosemionotus^{[Sepkoski 2002]}
- †Eoserranus^{[Sepkoski 2002]}
- †Eospinus^{[Sepkoski 2002]}
- †Eosynanceja^{[Sepkoski 2002]}
- †Eotetraodon^{[Sepkoski 2002]}
- †Eothynnus^{[Sepkoski 2002]}
- †Eothyrstites^{[Sepkoski 2002]}
- †Eotrigonodon^{[Sepkoski 2002]}
- †Eozanclus^{[Sepkoski 2002]}
- **Epigonus**^{[Sepkoski 2002]}
- **Epinephelus**^{[Sepkoski 2002]}
- **Epinnula**^{[Sepkoski 2002]}
- †Eriquius^{[Sepkoski 2002]}
- †Erugocentrus^{[Sepkoski 2002]}
- †Esocelops^{[Sepkoski 2002]}
- †Etringus^{[Sepkoski 2002]}
- **Etrumeus**^{[Sepkoski 2002]}
- †Eubiodectes^{[Sepkoski 2002]}
- †Eugnathides^{[Sepkoski 2002]}
- **Euleptorhamphus**^{[Sepkoski 2002]}
- **Eulichthys**^{[Sepkoski 2002]}
- †Euporosteus^{[Sepkoski 2002]}
- †Eurycormus^{[Sepkoski 2002]}
- †Eurynotoides^{[Sepkoski 2002]}
- †Eurypholis^{[Sepkoski 2002]}
- †Eurystichthys^{[Sepkoski 2002]}
- †Eusemius^{[Sepkoski 2002]}
- †Eusthenopteron^{[Sepkoski 2002]}
- **Euthynnus**^{[Sepkoski 2002]}
- †Euthynotus^{[Sepkoski 2002]}
- †Eutrichiurides^{[Sepkoski 2002]}
- **Eutrigla**^{[Sepkoski 2002]}
- †Euzaphleges
- †Evenkia^{[Sepkoski 2002]}
- **Evermanella**^{[Sepkoski 2002]}
- †Evesthes^{[Sepkoski 2002]}
- **Exallias**^{[Sepkoski 2002]}
- †Exellia^{[Sepkoski 2002]}
- †Exocoetoides^{[Sepkoski 2002]}

== F ==
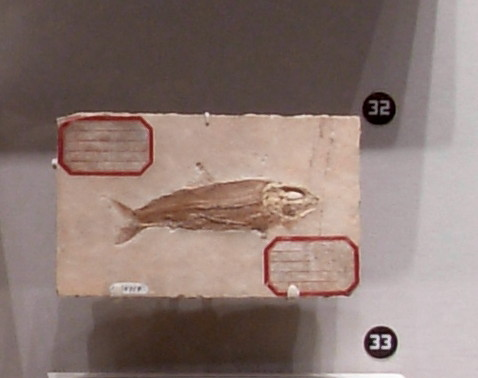
Furo longiserratus

- †Felberia
- †Ferganiscus
- †Ferganoceratodus
- †Feroxichthys
- **Fistularia**^{[Sepkoski 2002]}
- †Fistularioides^{[Sepkoski 2002]}
- †Fleurantia
- †Flindersicthys^{[Sepkoski 2002]}
- †Flugopterus^{[Sepkoski 2002]}
- †Foreyia
- †Frodoichthys
- †Fukangichthys^{[Sepkoski 2002]}
- †Furo^{[Sepkoski 2002]}
- †Fuyuanichthys
- †Fuyuanperleidus

== G ==
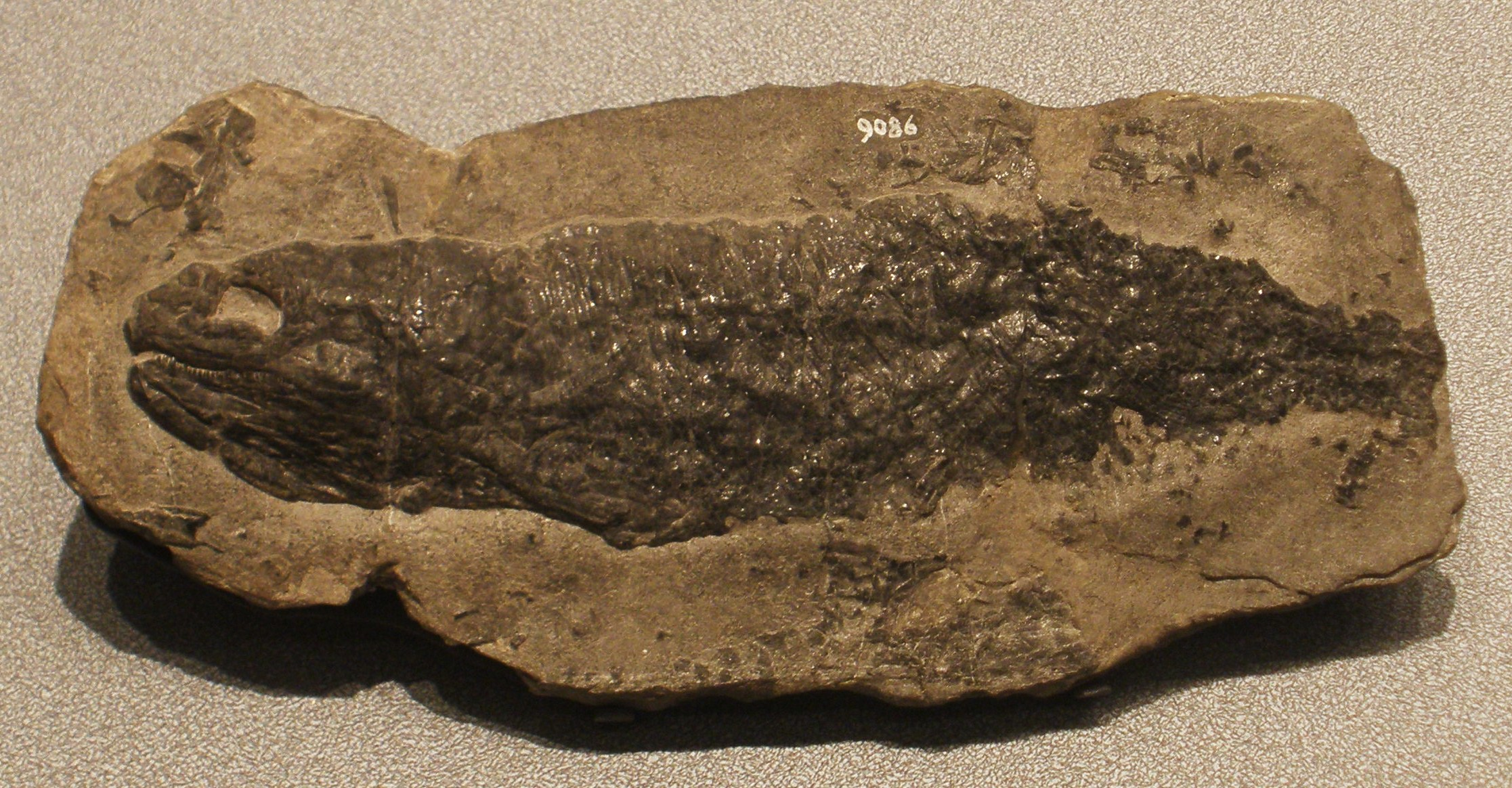
Gabanellia

- †Gabanellia^{[Sepkoski 2002]}
- †Gadella^{[Sepkoski 2002]}
- **Gadiculus**^{[Sepkoski 2002]}
- **Gadomus**^{[Sepkoski 2002]}
- **Gadus**^{[Sepkoski 2002]}
- **Gaidropsarus**^{[Sepkoski 2002]}
- †Ganoessus^{[Sepkoski 2002]}
- †Ganolytes^{[Sepkoski 2002]}
- †Ganorhynchus^{[Sepkoski 2002]}
- †Gardinerichthys^{[Sepkoski 2002]}
- †Gardinerpiscis
- †Garnbergia^{[Sepkoski 2002]}
- †Gasteroclupea^{[Sepkoski 2002]}
- †Gasterorhamphosus^{[Sepkoski 2002]}
- **Gasterosteus**^{[Sepkoski 2002]}
- †Gaudryella^{[Sepkoski 2002]}
- †Gazolapodus^{[Sepkoski 2002]}
- **Gazza**^{[Sepkoski 2002]}
- **Gempylus**^{[Sepkoski 2002]}
- **Genyonemus**^{[Sepkoski 2002]}
- **Genypterus**^{[Sepkoski 2002]}
- **Gephyroberyx**^{[Sepkoski 2002]}
- **Gerres**^{[Sepkoski 2002]}
- †Geryonichthys
- †Gharbouria^{[Sepkoski 2002]}
- †Gibbodon^{[Sepkoski 2002]}
- †Gigantopterus^{[Sepkoski 2002]}
- †Gillicus^{[Sepkoski 2002]}
- †Gillidia^{[Sepkoski 2002]}
- †Gimlichthys
- †Ginsburgia^{[Sepkoski 2002]}
- **Glaucosoma**^{[Sepkoski 2002]}
- †Globulodus
- **Glyptocephalus**^{[Sepkoski 2002]}
- †Glyptolepis^{[Sepkoski 2002]}
- **Glyptophidium**^{[Sepkoski 2002]}
- †Glyptopomus^{[Sepkoski 2002]}
- †Gnathoberyx^{[Sepkoski 2002]}
- **Gnathophis**^{[Sepkoski 2002]}
- **Gobius**^{[Sepkoski 2002]}
- †Gonatodus^{[Sepkoski 2002]}
- †Goniocranion^{[Sepkoski 2002]}
- **Gonostoma**^{[Sepkoski 2002]}
- †Gosfordia
- †Goslinophis^{[Sepkoski 2002]}
- †Goudkoffia^{[Sepkoski 2002]}
- †Gracilignathicthys^{[Sepkoski 2002]}
- **Grammatorcynus**^{[Sepkoski 2002]}
- †Grandemarinus
- †Graphiuricthys^{[Sepkoski 2002]}
- †Greenwoodella^{[Sepkoski 2002]}
- †Griphognathus^{[Sepkoski 2002]}
- †Grossipterus^{[Sepkoski 2002]}
- †Grypodon^{[Sepkoski 2002]}
- †Guntherichthys
- †Gymnoichthys
- **Gymnosarda**^{[Sepkoski 2002]}
- **Gymnoscopelus**^{[Sepkoski 2002]}
- †Gyrodus^{[Sepkoski 2002]}
- †Gyrolepidoides^{[Sepkoski 2002]}
- †Gyrolepis^{[Sepkoski 2002]}
- †Gyronchus^{[Sepkoski 2002]}
- †Gyroptychius^{[Sepkoski 2002]}
- †Gyrosteus^{[Sepkoski 2002]}

== H ==
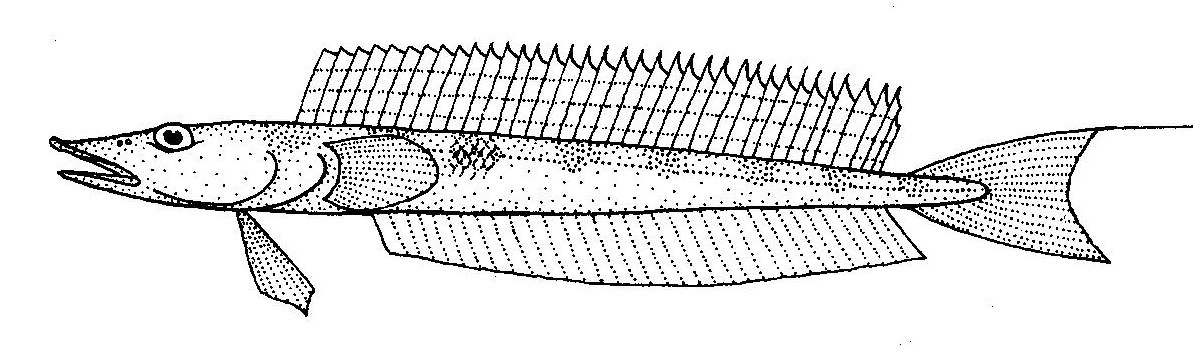
The Opalfish is a modern species of the genus Hemerocoetes (H. monopterygius)

- †Habroichthys^{[Sepkoski 2002]}
- †Hacquetia^{[Sepkoski 2002]}
- †Hadronector^{[Sepkoski 2002]}
- †Hainbergia^{[Sepkoski 2002]}
- †Halec^{[Sepkoski 2002]}
- †Halecopsis^{[Sepkoski 2002]}
- **Haliophis**^{[Sepkoski 2002]}
- †Haljulia^{[Sepkoski 2002]}
- †Hamodus^{[Sepkoski 2002]}
- †Haplolepis^{[Sepkoski 2002]}
- **Harengula**^{[Sepkoski 2002]}
- †Helgolandichthys^{[Sepkoski 2002]}
- †Helichthys^{[Sepkoski 2002]}
- †Helmolepis^{[Sepkoski 2002]}
- **Hemerocoetes**^{[Sepkoski 2002]}
- †Hemicalypterus^{[Sepkoski 2002]}
- †Hemilampronites^{[Sepkoski 2002]}
- †Hemirhabdorhynchus^{[Sepkoski 2002]}
- **Hemirhamphus**^{[Sepkoski 2002]}
- †Hemisaurida)^{[Sepkoski 2002]}
- **Hemithyrsites**^{[Sepkoski 2002]}
- †Hengnania^{[Sepkoski 2002]}
- †Heptanema^{[Sepkoski 2002]}
- †Herreraichthys
- †Heterolepidotus^{[Sepkoski 2002]}
- †Heterostrophus^{[Sepkoski 2002]}
- †Heterothrissa^{[Sepkoski 2002]}
- **Hildebrandia**^{[Sepkoski 2002]}
- **Hippocampus**^{[Sepkoski 2002]}
- **Hippoglossoides**^{[Sepkoski 2002]}
- †Hipposyngnathus^{[Sepkoski 2002]}
- †Histionotus^{[Sepkoski 2002]}
- †Histiothrissa^{[Sepkoski 2002]}
- †Holocentrites^{[Sepkoski 2002]}
- **Holocentrus**^{[Sepkoski 2002]}
- †Holodipterus^{[Sepkoski 2002]}
- †Holophagus^{[Sepkoski 2002]}
- †Holopterygius^{[Sepkoski 2002]}
- †Holoptychus^{[Sepkoski 2002]}
- †Holosteus^{[Sepkoski 2002]}
- †Homonotichthys^{[Sepkoski 2002]}
- †Homorhynchus^{[Sepkoski 2002]}
- **Hoplichthys**^{[Sepkoski 2002]}
- **Hoplobrotula**^{[Sepkoski 2002]}
- †Hoplopteryx^{[Sepkoski 2002]}
- **Hoplostethus**^{[Sepkoski 2002]}
- **Hoplunnis**^{[Sepkoski 2002]}
- †Horaclupea
- **Hucho** (extance disputed^{[Sepkoski 2002]})
- †Hulettia^{[Sepkoski 2002]}
- †Humilichthys^{[Sepkoski 2002]}
- †Hungkiichthys^{[Sepkoski 2002]}
- **Huso**^{[Sepkoski 2002]}
- †Hydropessum^{[Sepkoski 2002]}
- **Hygophum**^{[Sepkoski 2002]}
- **Hymenocephalus**^{[Sepkoski 2002]}
- **Hypacanthus**^{[Sepkoski 2002]}
- **Hyperoglyphe**^{[Sepkoski 2002]}
- **Hyperoplus**^{[Sepkoski 2002]}
- **Hyperprosopon**^{[Sepkoski 2002]}
- **Hypomesus**^{[Sepkoski 2002]}
- **Hyporhamphus**^{[Sepkoski 2002]}
- **Hypsocormus** (extance disputed^{[Sepkoski 2002]})

== I ==
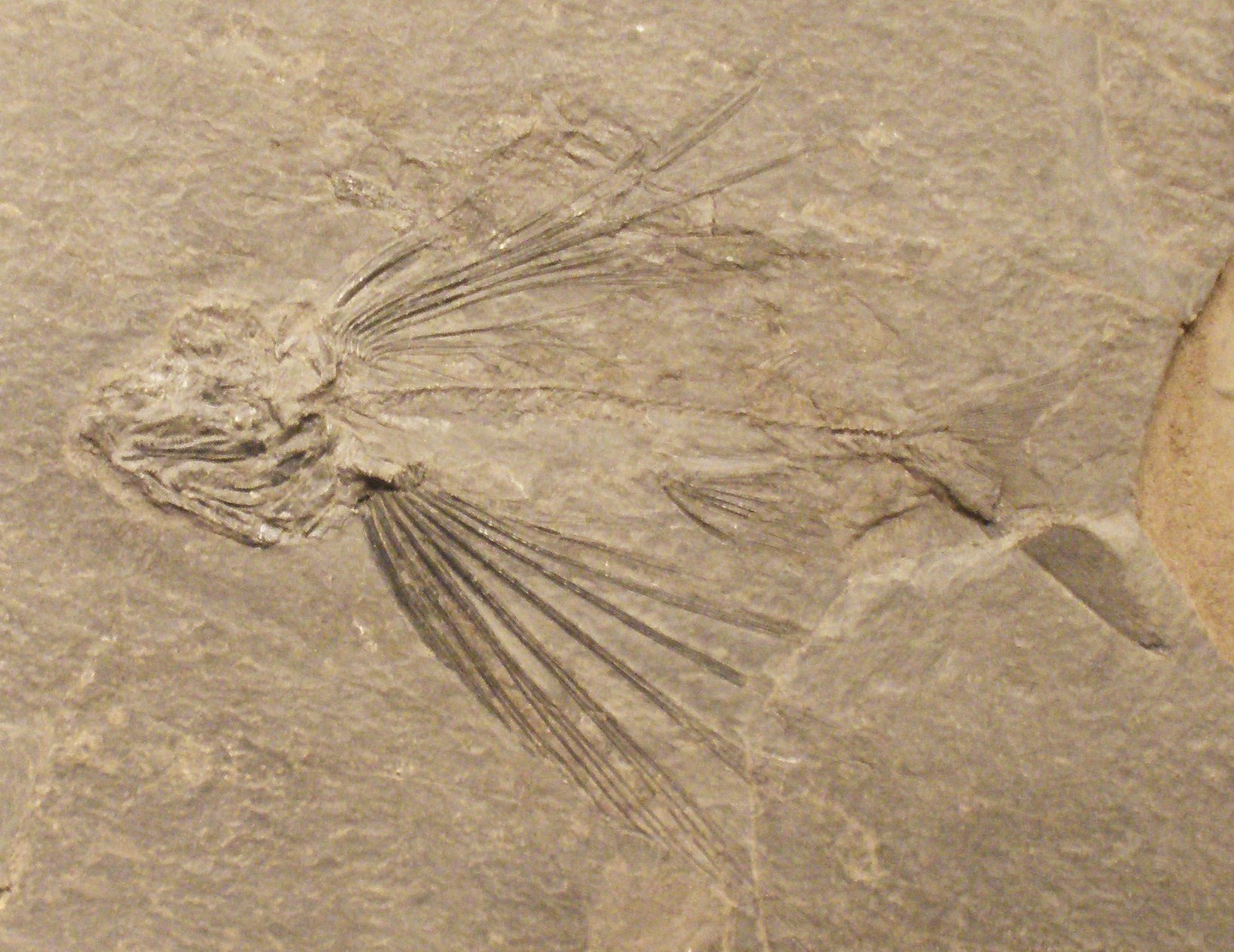
Italopterus magnificus

- †Icarealcyon
- **Icelinus**^{[Sepkoski 2002]}
- †Ichthyoceras^{[Sepkoski 2002]}
- **Ichthyococcus**^{[Sepkoski 2002]}
- †Ichthyodectes^{[Sepkoski 2002]}
- †Ichthyokentema^{[Sepkoski 2002]}
- †Ichthyotringa^{[Sepkoski 2002]}
- ✝Idrissa^{[Sepkoski 2002]}
- †Idrissia
- †Igornella^{[Sepkoski 2002]}
- †Igornichthys
- **Ilisha**^{[Sepkoski 2002]}
- †Illiniichthys^{[Sepkoski 2002]}
- †Imhoffius^{[Sepkoski 2002]}
- ✝incertae sedis^{[Sepkoski 2002]}
- †Indotrigonodon^{[Sepkoski 2002]}
- †Inichthys^{[Sepkoski 2002]}
- ✝Inocentrus^{[Sepkoski 2002]}
- †Ionoscopus^{[Sepkoski 2002]}
- †Ioscion^{[Sepkoski 2002]}
- †Irajapintoseidon
- **Isacia**^{[Sepkoski 2002]}
- †Isadia
- †Ischnolepis
- **Isopsetta**^{[Sepkoski 2002]}
- †Istieus^{[Sepkoski 2002]}
- **Istiophorus**^{[Sepkoski 2002]}
- †Isurichthys^{[Sepkoski 2002]}
- †Itararichthys
- †Izuus^{[Sepkoski 2002]}

== J ==
- †Jacobulus^{[Sepkoski 2002]}
- **Japonoconger**^{[Sepkoski 2002]}
- †Joleaudichthys^{[Sepkoski 2002]}
- †Judeichthys^{[Sepkoski 2002]}
- †Judeoberyx^{[Sepkoski 2002]}
- †Jungersenichthys^{[Sepkoski 2002]}

== K ==
- †Kalops
- †Kankatodus^{[Sepkoski 2002]}
- †Kansasiella
- †Kansius^{[Sepkoski 2002]}
- †Karaunguria
- †Kargalichthys
- †Kelliaichthys
- †Kentuckia^{[Sepkoski 2002]}
- †Khantausia
- †Kichkassia
- †Knightia^{[Sepkoski 2002]}
- †Koonwarria^{[Sepkoski 2002]}
- †Korutichthys^{[Sepkoski 2002]}
- **Kryptophaneron**^{[Sepkoski 2002]}
- **Kuhlia**^{[Sepkoski 2002]}
- †Kushlukia^{[Sepkoski 2002]}
- †Kyphosichthys
- **Kyphosida**^{[Sepkoski 2002]}
- †Kyrtogymnodon^{[Sepkoski 2002]}

== L ==
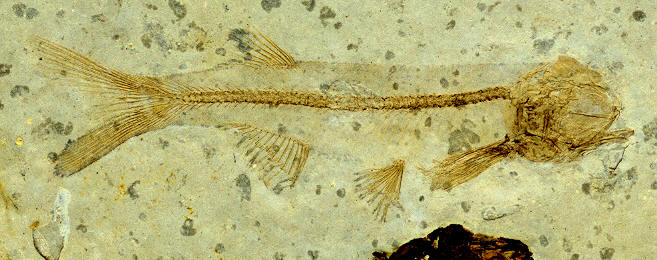
Fossil of Lycoptera davidi.

- **Labrisomus**^{[Sepkoski 2002]}
- **Labrodon**^{[Sepkoski 2002]}
- †Labrophagus^{[Sepkoski 2002]}
- **Labrus**^{[Sepkoski 2002]}
- **Lactarius**^{[Sepkoski 2002]}
- **Laemonema**^{[Sepkoski 2002]}
- **Lampadena**^{[Sepkoski 2002]}
- **Lampanyctodes**^{[Sepkoski 2002]}
- **Lampanyctus**^{[Sepkoski 2002]}
- **Lampichthyes**^{[Sepkoski 2002]}
- **Lampichthys**
- **Lampris**^{[Sepkoski 2002]}
- †Landanichthys^{[Sepkoski 2002]}
- **Larimus**^{[Sepkoski 2002]}
- †Latvius^{[Sepkoski 2002]}
- †Laugia^{[Sepkoski 2002]}
- †Laytonia^{[Sepkoski 2002]}
- ✝Lebonichthyes^{[Sepkoski 2002]}
- †Lebonichthys
- †Lednevia^{[Sepkoski 2002]}
- †Leedsichthys^{[Sepkoski 2002]}
- †Legnonotus^{[Sepkoski 2002]}
- †Lehmanotus^{[Sepkoski 2002]}
- **Leiognathus/**^{[Sepkoski 2002]}
- **Lepidion**^{[Sepkoski 2002]}
- **Lepidocottus**^{[Sepkoski 2002]}
- †Lepidogobius^{[Sepkoski 2002]}
- **Lepidopus**^{[Sepkoski 2002]}
- **Lepidorhombus**^{[Sepkoski 2002]}
- **Lepidotrigla**^{[Sepkoski 2002]}
- †Lepidotus^{[Sepkoski 2002]}
- **Lepisosteus**^{[Sepkoski 2002]}
- **Lepophidium**^{[Sepkoski 2002]}
- †Leptecodon^{[Sepkoski 2002]}
- **Leptocottus**^{[Sepkoski 2002]}
- †Leptolepides^{[Sepkoski 2002]}
- **Leptolepis** (extance disputed^{[Sepkoski 2002]})
- **Leptoscopus**^{[Sepkoski 2002]}
- †Lestidiops (extance disputed^{[Sepkoski 2002]})
- **Lethops**^{[Sepkoski 2002]}
- **Leuresthes**^{[Sepkoski 2002]}
- †Libanoberyx^{[Sepkoski 2002]}
- †Libotonius^{[Sepkoski 2002]}
- †Libys^{[Sepkoski 2002]}
- †Ligulalepis^{[Sepkoski 2002]}
- †Ligulella^{[Sepkoski 2002]}
- **Limanda**^{[Sepkoski 2002]}
- †Liodesmus^{[Sepkoski 2002]}
- †Lirosceles^{[Sepkoski 2002]}
- †Lissoberyx^{[Sepkoski 2002]}
- **Lithognathus**^{[Sepkoski 2002]}
- †Litoptychius^{[Sepkoski 2002]}
- **Liza**^{[Sepkoski 2002]}
- **Lobianchia**^{[Sepkoski 2002]}
- †Lobopterus^{[Sepkoski 2002]}
- †Lochmocereus^{[Sepkoski 2002]}
- †Lompoquia^{[Sepkoski 2002]}
- **Lonchistium**^{[Sepkoski 2002]}
- †Lophar^{[Sepkoski 2002]}
- †Lophiostomus^{[Sepkoski 2002]}
- **Lophius**^{[Sepkoski 2002]}
- †Lophosteus^{[Sepkoski 2002]}
- **Lota**^{[Sepkoski 2002]}
- †Lualabaea
- †Luederia
- †Luganoia^{[Sepkoski 2002]}
- †Luisichthys^{[Sepkoski 2002]}
- †Luisiella^{[Sepkoski 2002]}
- †Lusitanichthys^{[Sepkoski 2002]}
- **Luvarus**^{[Sepkoski 2002]}
- †Luxilites^{[Sepkoski 2002]}
- **Lycodopsis**^{[Sepkoski 2002]}
- **Lyconectes**^{[Sepkoski 2002]}
- †Lycoptera
- **Lyopsetta**^{[Sepkoski 2002]}
- †Lyrolepis^{[Sepkoski 2002]}

== M ==
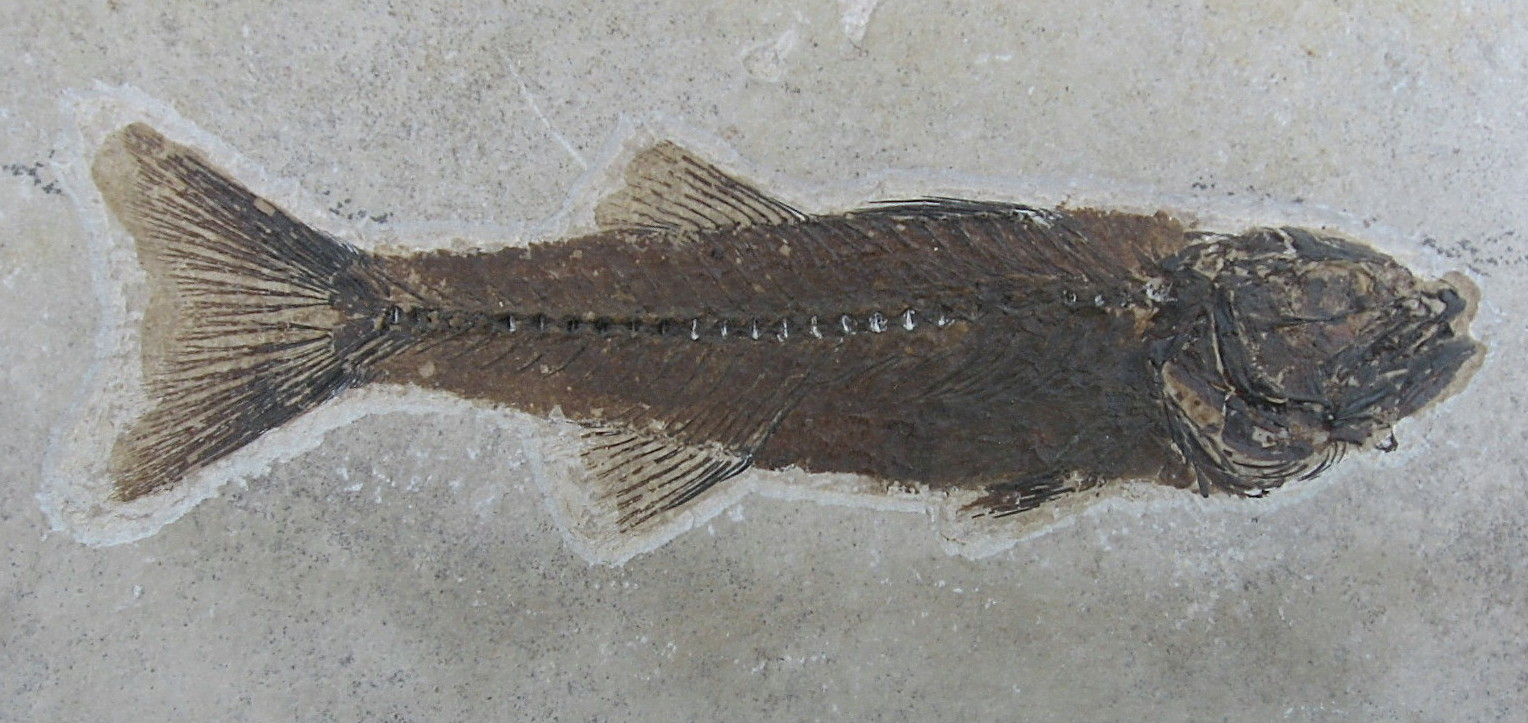
Mioplosus labracoides

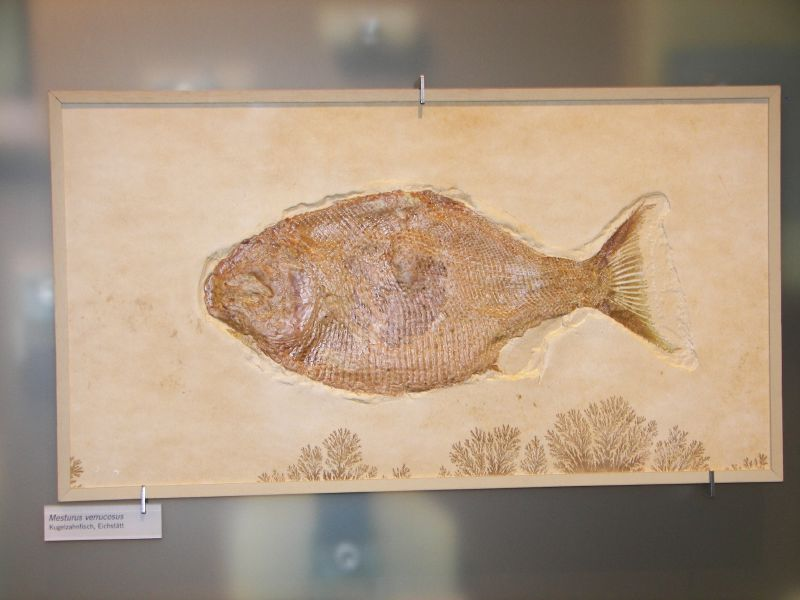
Mesturus fossil

- **Maccullochella**^{[Sepkoski 2002]}
- †Macrepistius^{[Sepkoski 2002]}
- †Macroaulostomus^{[Sepkoski 2002]}
- †Macropoma^{[Sepkoski 2002]}
- †Macropomoides^{[Sepkoski 2002]}
- †Macrosemimimus
- †Macrosemius^{[Sepkoski 2002]}
- **Macruronus**^{[Sepkoski 2002]}
- †Madariscus^{[Sepkoski 2002]}
- **Makaira**^{[Sepkoski 2002]}
- **Malacocottus**^{[Sepkoski 2002]}
- †Malacopygaeus^{[Sepkoski 2002]}
- **Mallotus**^{[Sepkoski 2002]}
- †Mamulichthys
- †Manlietta^{[Sepkoski 2002]}
- †Marcopoloichthys
- **Marosichthys**^{[Sepkoski 2002]}
- †Martinichthys^{[Sepkoski 2002]}
- †Masillosteus
- **Mastygocercus**^{[Sepkoski 2002]}
- **Matarchia**^{[Sepkoski 2002]}
- **Maulisia**^{[Sepkoski 2002]}
- **Maurolicus**^{[Sepkoski 2002]}
- **Megalops**^{[Sepkoski 2002]}
- †Megapomus^{[Sepkoski 2002]}
- †Megistolepis^{[Sepkoski 2002]}
- †Meidiichthys^{[Sepkoski 2002]}
- †Meisenheimichthys
- **Melamphaes**^{[Sepkoski 2002]}
- †Melanognathus^{[Sepkoski 2002]}
- **Melanogrammus**^{[Sepkoski 2002]}
- **Melanonus**^{[Sepkoski 2002]}
- **Mene**^{[Sepkoski 2002]}
- **Menidia**^{[Sepkoski 2002]}
- **Menticirrhus**^{[Sepkoski 2002]}
- †Meridensia^{[Sepkoski 2002]}
- **Merlangius**^{[Sepkoski 2002]}
- **Merluccius**^{[Sepkoski 2002]}
- †Mesoclupea^{[Sepkoski 2002]}
- †Mesolepis^{[Sepkoski 2002]}
- †Mesturus^{[Sepkoski 2002]}
- †Microcapros^{[Sepkoski 2002]}
- †Microceratodus
- **Microchirus**^{[Sepkoski 2002]}
- **Microgadus**^{[Sepkoski 2002]}
- **Micromesistius**^{[Sepkoski 2002]}
- †Micromyrus^{[Sepkoski 2002]}
- †Micropycnodon^{[Sepkoski 2002]}
- **Microstomus**^{[Sepkoski 2002]}
- †Miguashaia^{[Sepkoski 2002]}
- †Milananguilla^{[Sepkoski 2002]}
- ✝Mimia^{[Sepkoski 2002]}
- †Mimipiscis
- †Mioplosus^{[Sepkoski 2002]}
- **Mola**^{[Sepkoski 2002]}
- **Molva**^{[Sepkoski 2002]}
- **Monocentris**^{[Sepkoski 2002]}
- **Monochirus**^{[Sepkoski 2002]}
- **Monolene**^{[Sepkoski 2002]}
- **Monomitopus**^{[Sepkoski 2002]}
- †Moorevillia^{[Sepkoski 2002]}
- **Morone**^{[Sepkoski 2002]}
- †Morrolepis
- †Moythomasia^{[Sepkoski 2002]}
- **Mugil**^{[Sepkoski 2002]}
- **Mullus**^{[Sepkoski 2002]}
- **Mupus**^{[Sepkoski 2002]}
- **Muraena**^{[Sepkoski 2002]}
- **Muraenesox**^{[Sepkoski 2002]}
- †Mutovinia
- **Myctophum**^{[Sepkoski 2002]}
- †Mylacanthus^{[Sepkoski 2002]}
- †Mylomyrus^{[Sepkoski 2002]}
- **Myripristis**^{[Sepkoski 2002]}
- **Myroconger**^{[Sepkoski 2002]}
- **Mystriophis**^{[Sepkoski 2002]}

== N ==
- †Namatozodia
- ✝name^{[Sepkoski 2002]}
- †Nannolepis^{[Sepkoski 2002]}
- **Nansenia**^{[Sepkoski 2002]}
- †Nardoichthys
- **Naso**^{[Sepkoski 2002]}
- †Natlandia^{[Sepkoski 2002]}
- †Naupygus^{[Sepkoski 2002]}
- †Naxilepis^{[Sepkoski 2002]}
- **Neanthias**^{[Sepkoski 2002]}
- **Nebris**^{[Sepkoski 2002]}
- †Nematonotus^{[Sepkoski 2002]}
- †Nematoptychius^{[Sepkoski 2002]}
- **Neobythites**^{[Sepkoski 2002]}
- †Neocassandra^{[Sepkoski 2002]}
- **Neoceratodus**
- †Neocybium^{[Sepkoski 2002]}
- †Neohalecopsis^{[Sepkoski 2002]}
- †Neopachycormus^{[Sepkoski 2002]}
- †Neopholidophoropsis^{[Sepkoski 2002]}
- **Neoplatycephalus**^{[Sepkoski 2002]}
- †Neorhombolepis^{[Sepkoski 2002]}
- **Neoscombrops**^{[Sepkoski 2002]}
- †Nephrotus
- **Nerophis**^{[Sepkoski 2002]}
- †Nesides^{[Sepkoski 2002]}
- **Nettastoma**^{[Sepkoski 2002]}
- †Neuburgella^{[Sepkoski 2002]}
- **Nezumia**^{[Sepkoski 2002]}
- †Nhanulepisosteus
- †Nielsenia
- †Niobrara^{[Sepkoski 2002]}
- †Nolfophidion^{[Sepkoski 2002]}
- **Notacanthus**^{[Sepkoski 2002]}
- †Notagogus^{[Sepkoski 2002]}
- †Notelops^{[Sepkoski 2002]}
- **Notesthes**^{[Sepkoski 2002]}
- †Notogoneus^{[Sepkoski 2002]}
- **Notolepis**^{[Sepkoski 2002]}
- **Notoscopelus**^{[Sepkoski 2002]}
- †Nozamichthys^{[Sepkoski 2002]}
- †Nursallia^{[Sepkoski 2002]}
- †Nybelinoides^{[Sepkoski 2002]}

== O ==
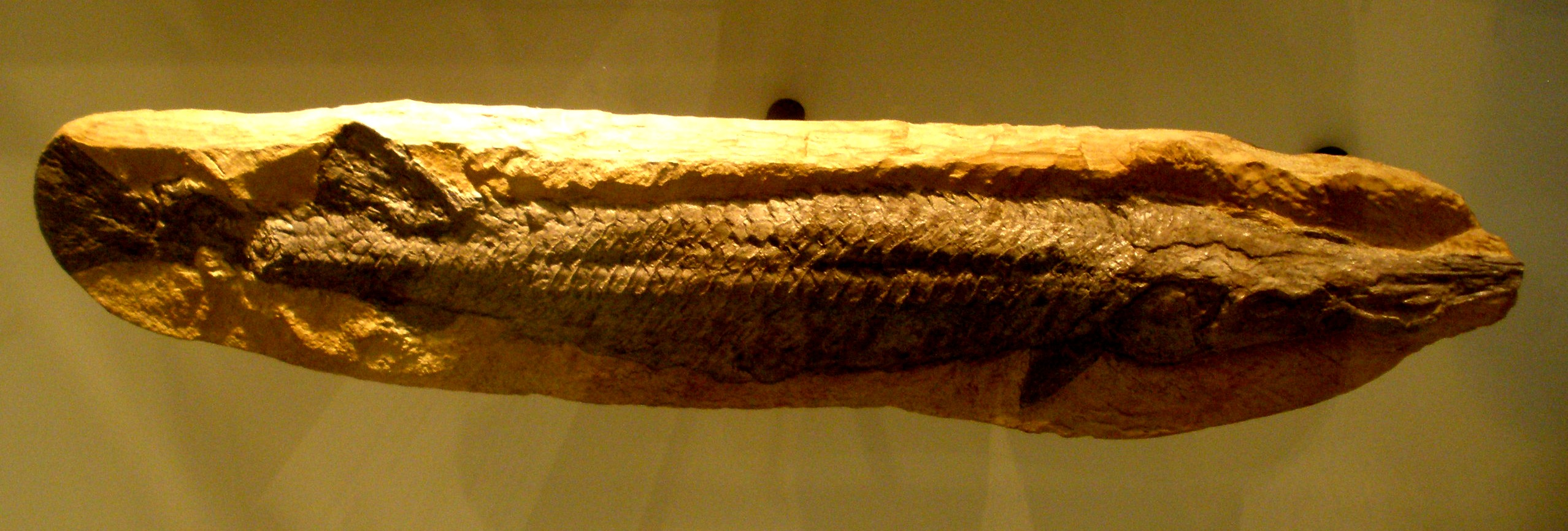
Obaichthys decoratus

- **Oblada**^{[Sepkoski 2002]}
- †Occithrissops^{[Sepkoski 2002]}
- †Ocystias^{[Sepkoski 2002]}
- †Odmdenia^{[Sepkoski 2002]}
- †Odonteabolca^{[Sepkoski 2002]}
- **Ogcocephalus**^{[Sepkoski 2002]}
- **Ogilbia**^{[Sepkoski 2002]}
- †Ohuus^{[Sepkoski 2002]}
- †Oligobalistes^{[Sepkoski 2002]}
- †Oligodiodon^{[Sepkoski 2002]}
- †Oligolactoria^{[Sepkoski 2002]}
- †Oligolophotes
- †Oligopleura^{[Sepkoski 2002]}
- †Oligopleurus^{[Sepkoski 2002]}
- **Oligoplites**^{[Sepkoski 2002]}
- **Oligopus**^{[Sepkoski 2002]}
- †Omosoma^{[Sepkoski 2002]}
- †Omosomopsis^{[Sepkoski 2002]}
- †Oncolepis^{[Sepkoski 2002]}
- **Oncorhynchus**^{[Sepkoski 2002]}
- †Oniichthys
- **Onuxodon**^{[Sepkoski 2002]}
- †Onychodus^{[Sepkoski 2002]}
- **Ophidion**^{[Sepkoski 2002]}
- **Ophiodon**^{[Sepkoski 2002]}
- †Ophiopsis^{[Sepkoski 2002]}
- **Ophisthoproctus**^{[Sepkoski 2002]}
- **Ophisurus**^{[Sepkoski 2002]}
- †Opisthomyzon^{[Sepkoski 2002]}
- **Opisthonema**^{[Sepkoski 2002]}
- †Opistopteryx^{[Sepkoski 2002]}
- **Oplegnathus**^{[Sepkoski 2002]}
- †Opsithrissops^{[Sepkoski 2002]}
- **Optivus**^{[Sepkoski 2002]}
- †Oreochima^{[Sepkoski 2002]}
- †Ornategulum^{[Sepkoski 2002]}
- †Orthocormus^{[Sepkoski 2002]}
- **Orthopristis**^{[Sepkoski 2002]}
- †Orthurus^{[Sepkoski 2002]}
- †Orvikuina^{[Sepkoski 2002]}
- †Oshunia^{[Sepkoski 2002]}
- †Osmeroides^{[Sepkoski 2002]}
- **Osmerus**^{[Sepkoski 2002]}
- †Osorioichthys^{[Sepkoski 2002]}
- †Ospia^{[Sepkoski 2002]}
- †Ostariostoma^{[Sepkoski 2002]}
- †Osteolepis^{[Sepkoski 2002]}
- †Osteorachis^{[Sepkoski 2002]}
- **Ostracion**^{[Sepkoski 2002]}
- **Ostracoberyx**^{[Sepkoski 2002]}
- †Otomitla^{[Sepkoski 2002]}
- **Oxyjulis**^{[Sepkoski 2002]}

== P ==
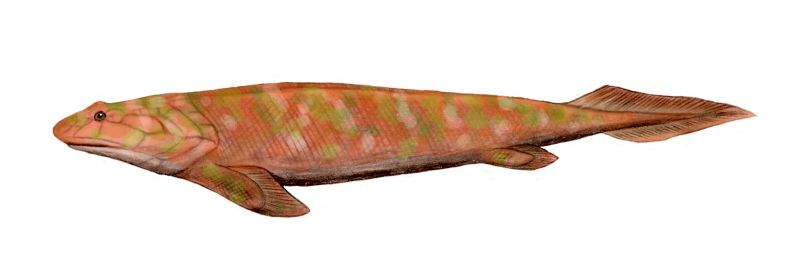
Reconstruction of Panderichthys

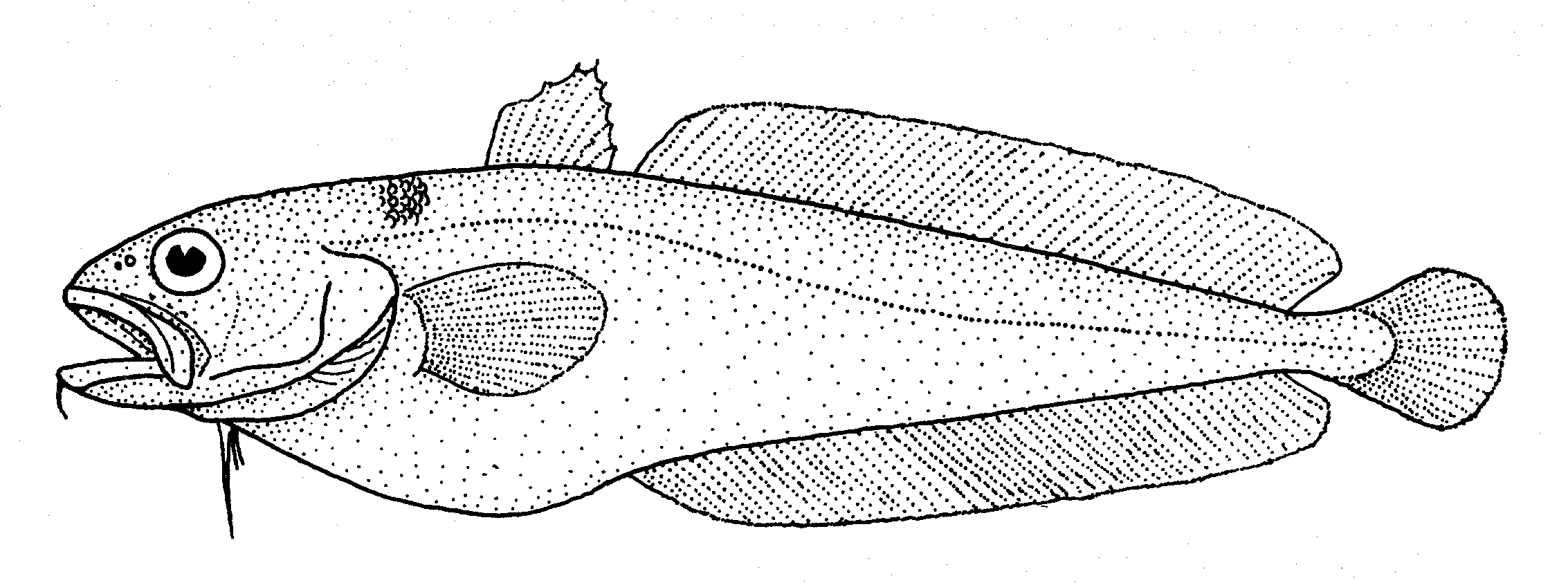
The northern bastard codling, a modern species of Pseudophycis (P. breviuscula).

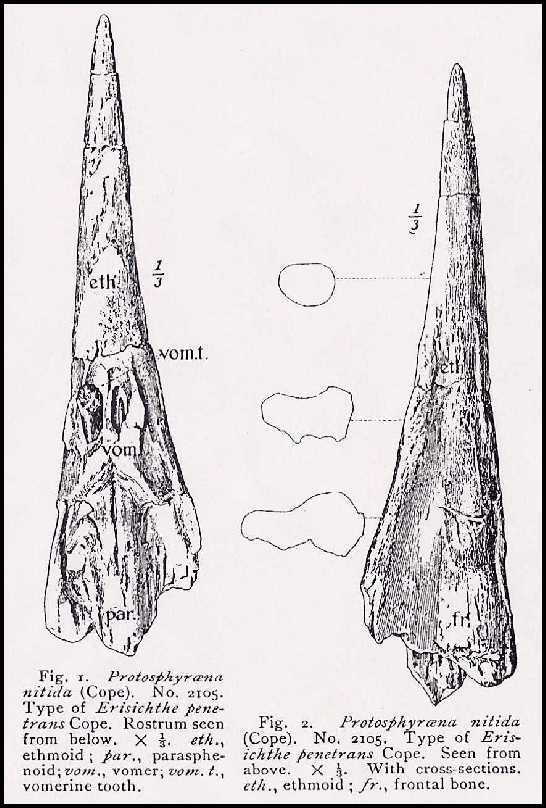
Holotype rostrum of Protosphyraena nitida, a successful genus of middle Cretaceous swordfish (from Hay, 1903).

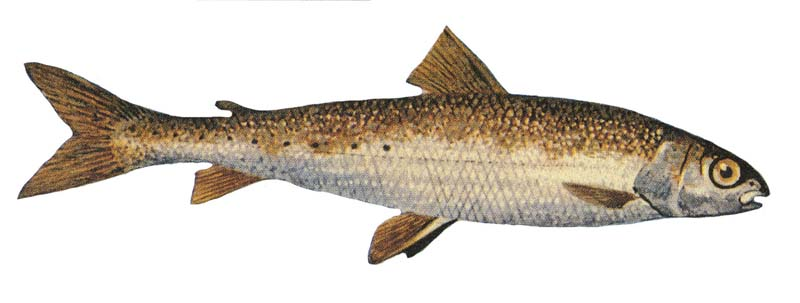
The round whitefish, a modern species of Prosopium (P. cylindraceum)

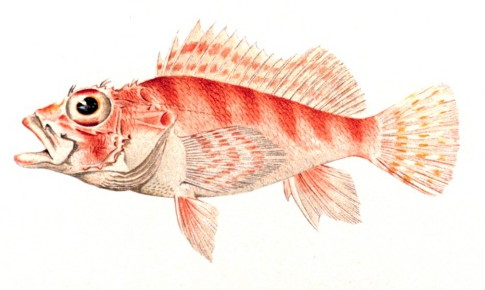
An example of a modern Pontinus species (P. nematophthalmus)

- †Pachycormus^{[Sepkoski 2002]}
- †Pachyrizodus^{[Sepkoski 2002]}
- †Pachythrissops^{[Sepkoski 2002]}
- †Pachytrissops^{[Sepkoski 2002]}
- **Pagellus**^{[Sepkoski 2002]}
- **Pagrus**^{[Sepkoski 2002]}
- †Palaedaphus^{[Sepkoski 2002]}
- †Palaeoatherina^{[Sepkoski 2002]}
- †Palaeobalistum^{[Sepkoski 2002]}
- †Palaeocentrotus^{[Sepkoski 2002]}
- †Palaeocyttus^{[Sepkoski 2002]}
- †Palaeogadus^{[Sepkoski 2002]}
- †Palaeolycus^{[Sepkoski 2002]}
- †Palaeomolva^{[Sepkoski 2002]}
- †Palaeomyrus^{[Sepkoski 2002]}
- †Palaeoniscum^{[Sepkoski 2002]}
- †Palaeoperca^{[Sepkoski 2002]}
- †Palaeopercichthys^{[Sepkoski 2002]}
- †Palaeophichthys^{[Sepkoski 2002]}
- †Palaeorhynchus^{[Sepkoski 2002]}
- †Palaeothrissum^{[Sepkoski 2002]}
- †Palaeothunnus^{[Sepkoski 2002]}
- †Paleopsephurus^{[Sepkoski 2002]}
- †Palimphyes^{[Sepkoski 2002]}
- †Panderichthys^{[Sepkoski 2002]}
- †Pantophilus^{[Sepkoski 2002]}
- **Panturichthys**^{[Sepkoski 2002]}
- †Paraberyx^{[Sepkoski 2002]}
- †Paracalamus^{[Sepkoski 2002]}
- †Paracentrophorus^{[Sepkoski 2002]}
- †Paraceratodus
- **Paraconger**^{[Sepkoski 2002]}
- †Paracongroides^{[Sepkoski 2002]}
- †Paradrydenius^{[Sepkoski 2002]}
- †Paraeoliscus^{[Sepkoski 2002]}
- †Paragonatodus^{[Sepkoski 2002]}
- †Paraipichthys^{[Sepkoski 2002]}
- †Paralbula^{[Sepkoski 2002]}
- †Paralepidosteus^{[Sepkoski 2002]}
- †Paralepidotus^{[Sepkoski 2002]}
- **Paralepis**^{[Sepkoski 2002]}
- **Paralichthys**^{[Sepkoski 2002]}
- †Paralogoniscus^{[Sepkoski 2002]}
- †Paramblypterus^{[Sepkoski 2002]}
- †Paramesolepis^{[Sepkoski 2002]}
- †Paramphisile^{[Sepkoski 2002]}
- †Paranguilla^{[Sepkoski 2002]}
- †Paranogmius^{[Sepkoski 2002]}
- **Parapercis**^{[Sepkoski 2002]}
- †Paraperleidus
- †Parapholidophorus^{[Sepkoski 2002]}
- **Paraplagusia**^{[Sepkoski 2002]}
- †Paraplatax^{[Sepkoski 2002]}
- †Parapleuropholis^{[Sepkoski 2002]}
- **Parapristopoma**^{[Sepkoski 2002]}
- †Parapygaeus^{[Sepkoski 2002]}
- †Pararhenanoperca^{[Sepkoski 2002]}
- †Parascopelus^{[Sepkoski 2002]}
- †Parasemionotus^{[Sepkoski 2002]}
- †Parasphyraena^{[Sepkoski 2002]}
- †Parasynarcualis^{[Sepkoski 2002]}
- †Paratarpon^{[Sepkoski 2002]}
- †Paratarrasius^{[Sepkoski 2002]}
- †Paratichthys^{[Sepkoski 2002]}
- †Paratrachinotus^{[Sepkoski 2002]}
- **Paratrisopterus**^{[Sepkoski 2002]}
- †Paravinciguerria^{[Sepkoski 2002]}
- †Parechelus^{[Sepkoski 2002]}
- †Parenchodus^{[Sepkoski 2002]}
- **Parophrys**^{[Sepkoski 2002]}
- †Parospinus^{[Sepkoski 2002]}
- **Parvilux**^{[Sepkoski 2002]}
- ✝Pasaichthyes^{[Sepkoski 2002]}
- †Pasaichthys
- †Patavichthys^{[Sepkoski 2002]}
- †Pateroperca^{[Sepkoski 2002]}
- †Pattersonichthys^{[Sepkoski 2002]}
- †Pattersonoberyx^{[Sepkoski 2002]}
- **Pegusa**^{[Sepkoski 2002]}
- †Peipiaosteus^{[Sepkoski 2002]}
- †Pelargorhynchus^{[Sepkoski 2002]}
- **Pelates**^{[Sepkoski 2002]}
- †Peltoperleidus^{[Sepkoski 2002]}
- †Peltopleurus^{[Sepkoski 2002]}
- **Pempheris**^{[Sepkoski 2002]}
- **Pennahia**^{[Sepkoski 2002]}
- **Pentaceros**^{[Sepkoski 2002]}
- **Pentanemus**^{[Sepkoski 2002]}
- **Pentaprion**^{[Sepkoski 2002]}
- **Percalates**^{[Sepkoski 2002]}
- †Percostoma^{[Sepkoski 2002]}
- †Pericentrophus^{[Sepkoski 2002]}
- †Peripeltopleurus^{[Sepkoski 2002]}
- **Peristedion**^{[Sepkoski 2002]}
- †Perleidus^{[Sepkoski 2002]}
- **Perulibatrachus**^{[Sepkoski 2002]}
- †Petalopteryx^{[Sepkoski 2002]}
- **Phanerodon**^{[Sepkoski 2002]}
- †Phanerosteon^{[Sepkoski 2002]}
- †Pharmacichthys^{[Sepkoski 2002]}
- †Phoenicolepis^{[Sepkoski 2002]}
- †Pholidoctenus^{[Sepkoski 2002]}
- †Pholidolepis^{[Sepkoski 2002]}
- †Pholidophoretes^{[Sepkoski 2002]}
- †Pholidophoristion^{[Sepkoski 2002]}
- †Pholidophoroides^{[Sepkoski 2002]}
- †Pholidophoropsis^{[Sepkoski 2002]}
- †Pholidophorus^{[Sepkoski 2002]}
- †Pholidopleurus^{[Sepkoski 2002]}
- †Pholidorhynchodon^{[Sepkoski 2002]}
- †Phosphichthys^{[Sepkoski 2002]}
- **Photichthys**^{[Sepkoski 2002]}
- **Phycis**^{[Sepkoski 2002]}
- †Phylactocephalus^{[Sepkoski 2002]}
- †Phyllodus^{[Sepkoski 2002]}
- **Physiculus**^{[Sepkoski 2002]}
- †Pillararhynchus^{[Sepkoski 2002]}
- **Pimelometopon**^{[Sepkoski 2002]}
- †Pinichthys^{[Sepkoski 2002]}
- †Pirskenius^{[Sepkoski 2002]}
- †Pisdurodon^{[Sepkoski 2002]}
- **Pisodonophis**^{[Sepkoski 2002]}
- †Piveteauia^{[Sepkoski 2002]}
- †Placopleurus^{[Sepkoski 2002]}
- †Plagioholocentrum^{[Sepkoski 2002]}
- **Platax**^{[Sepkoski 2002]}
- **Platichthys**^{[Sepkoski 2002]}
- †Platinx^{[Sepkoski 2002]}
- **Platycephalus**^{[Sepkoski 2002]}
- †Platylaemus^{[Sepkoski 2002]}
- †Platylates^{[Sepkoski 2002]}
- †Platysiagum^{[Sepkoski 2002]}
- †Platysomus^{[Sepkoski 2002]}
- †Plectocretacicus^{[Sepkoski 2002]}
- **Plectorhinchus**^{[Sepkoski 2002]}
- **Plectrites** (extance disputed^{[Sepkoski 2002]})
- Plectrypops (extance disputed^{[Sepkoski 2002]})
- †Plegmolepis
- †Plesioberyx^{[Sepkoski 2002]}
- †Plesiococcolepis^{[Sepkoski 2002]}
- †Plesiolepidotus^{[Sepkoski 2002]}
- †Plesioperleidus^{[Sepkoski 2002]}
- †Plesioserranus^{[Sepkoski 2002]}
- †Plethodus^{[Sepkoski 2002]}
- **Pleuronichthys**^{[Sepkoski 2002]}
- †Pleuropholis^{[Sepkoski 2002]}
- †Pliodetes
- †Podocephalus^{[Sepkoski 2002]}
- **Podothecus**^{[Sepkoski 2002]}
- **Pogonias**^{[Sepkoski 2002]}
- **Pollachius** (extance disputed^{[Sepkoski 2002]})
- **Polydactylus**^{[Sepkoski 2002]}
- †Polygyrodus^{[Sepkoski 2002]}
- †Polyipnoides^{[Sepkoski 2002]}
- **Polyipnus**^{[Sepkoski 2002]}
- **Polymetme**^{[Sepkoski 2002]}
- **Polymetmeglareosus**^{[Sepkoski 2002]}
- **Polymixia**^{[Sepkoski 2002]}
- †Polyosteorhynchus^{[Sepkoski 2002]}
- †Polzbergia^{[Sepkoski 2002]}
- **Pomacanthus**^{[Sepkoski 2002]}
- **Pomadasys**^{[Sepkoski 2002]}
- **Pomolobus**^{[Sepkoski 2002]}
- **Pontinus**^{[Sepkoski 2002]}
- **Porichthys**^{[Sepkoski 2002]}
- †Porolepis^{[Sepkoski 2002]}
- **Poromitra**^{[Sepkoski 2002]}
- †Powichthys^{[Sepkoski 2002]}
- †Praewoodsia^{[Sepkoski 2002]}
- †Pranesus (extance disputed^{[Sepkoski 2002]})
- †Prevolitans^{[Sepkoski 2002]}
- †Priacanthopsis^{[Sepkoski 2002]}
- **Priacanthus**^{[Sepkoski 2002]}
- †Prionolepis^{[Sepkoski 2002]}
- †Prionopleurus^{[Sepkoski 2002]}
- **Prionotus**^{[Sepkoski 2002]}
- †Priscacara^{[Sepkoski 2002]}
- **Pristigenys**^{[Sepkoski 2002]}
- ✝Pristiosomus^{[Sepkoski 2002]}
- †Pristisomus
- †Proaracana^{[Sepkoski 2002]}
- †Proargentina^{[Sepkoski 2002]}
- †Procheirichthys^{[Sepkoski 2002]}
- †Prodiodon^{[Sepkoski 2002]}
- †Progempylus^{[Sepkoski 2002]}
- †Progymnodon^{[Sepkoski 2002]}
- †Prohalecites^{[Sepkoski 2002]}
- †Prolates^{[Sepkoski 2002]}
- †Prolepidotus^{[Sepkoski 2002]}
- †Proleptolepis^{[Sepkoski 2002]}
- †Proluvarus^{[Sepkoski 2002]}
- †Promegalops^{[Sepkoski 2002]}
- †Pronotacanthus^{[Sepkoski 2002]}
- †Propercarina^{[Sepkoski 2002]}
- †Propteridium^{[Sepkoski 2002]}
- †Propterus^{[Sepkoski 2002]}
- †Prosauropsis^{[Sepkoski 2002]}
- †Proscinetes^{[Sepkoski 2002]}
- †Proserranus^{[Sepkoski 2002]}
- †Proserrivomer^{[Sepkoski 2002]}
- †Prosolenostomus^{[Sepkoski 2002]}
- **Prosopium**^{[Sepkoski 2002]}
- †Protacanthodes^{[Sepkoski 2002]}
- †Protamblyptera^{[Sepkoski 2002]}
- †Protanthias^{[Sepkoski 2002]}
- †Protarpon^{[Sepkoski 2002]}
- **Protaulopsis**^{[Sepkoski 2002]}
- †Protautoga^{[Sepkoski 2002]}
- †Protelops^{[Sepkoski 2002]}
- †Proteomyrus^{[Sepkoski 2002]}
- ✝Protobalistum^{[Sepkoski 2002]}
- †Protobalistum
- †Protobrama^{[Sepkoski 2002]}
- †Protobrotula^{[Sepkoski 2002]}
- †Protoclupea^{[Sepkoski 2002]}
- **Protolophotus**^{[Sepkoski 2002]}
- **Protomyctophum**^{[Sepkoski 2002]}
- †Protorhamphosus^{[Sepkoski 2002]}
- †Protoscaphirhynchus^{[Sepkoski 2002]}
- †Protosphyraena^{[Sepkoski 2002]}
- †Protostomias^{[Sepkoski 2002]}
- †Protriacanthus^{[Sepkoski 2002]}
- †Prymnetes^{[Sepkoski 2002]}
- **Psenes**^{[Sepkoski 2002]}
- †Psenicubiceps^{[Sepkoski 2002]}
- †Psephurus
- **Psettodes**^{[Sepkoski 2002]}
- †Psettopsis^{[Sepkoski 2002]}
- †Pseudholocentrum^{[Sepkoski 2002]}
- †Pseudoberyx^{[Sepkoski 2002]}
- †Pseudoegertonia^{[Sepkoski 2002]}
- †Pseudoellimma
- **Pseudohilsa**^{[Sepkoski 2002]}
- **Pseudohistiophorus**^{[Sepkoski 2002]}
- †Pseudoleptolepis^{[Sepkoski 2002]}
- **Pseudophichthyes**^{[Sepkoski 2002]}
- **Pseudophycis** (extance disputed^{[Sepkoski 2002]})
- †Pseudoraniceps^{[Sepkoski 2002]}
- **Pseudoscaris**^{[Sepkoski 2002]}
- **Pseudoscopelus**^{[Sepkoski 2002]}
- †Pseudoseriola^{[Sepkoski 2002]}
- †Pseudosphaerodon^{[Sepkoski 2002]}
- †Pseudosyngnathus^{[Sepkoski 2002]}
- †Pseudotetrapterus^{[Sepkoski 2002]}
- †Pseudoumbrina^{[Sepkoski 2002]}
- †Pseudovomer^{[Sepkoski 2002]}
- **Pseudoxenomystax**^{[Sepkoski 2002]}
- †Psilichthys^{[Sepkoski 2002]}
- †Pteronisculus^{[Sepkoski 2002]}
- †Pteroniscus
- **Pterothrissus**^{[Sepkoski 2002]}
- †Pterygocephalus^{[Sepkoski 2002]}
- †Ptycholepis^{[Sepkoski 2002]}
- **Pungitius**^{[Sepkoski 2002]}
- **Pycnodus** (extance disputed^{[Sepkoski 2002]})
- †Pycnosterinx^{[Sepkoski 2002]}
- †Pycnosteroides^{[Sepkoski 2002]}
- †Pygaeus^{[Sepkoski 2002]}
- †Pygopterus

== Q ==
- †Qingmenodus
- †Qingshania
- †Quayia
- †Quebecius
- †Quisque^{[Sepkoski 2002]}

== R ==
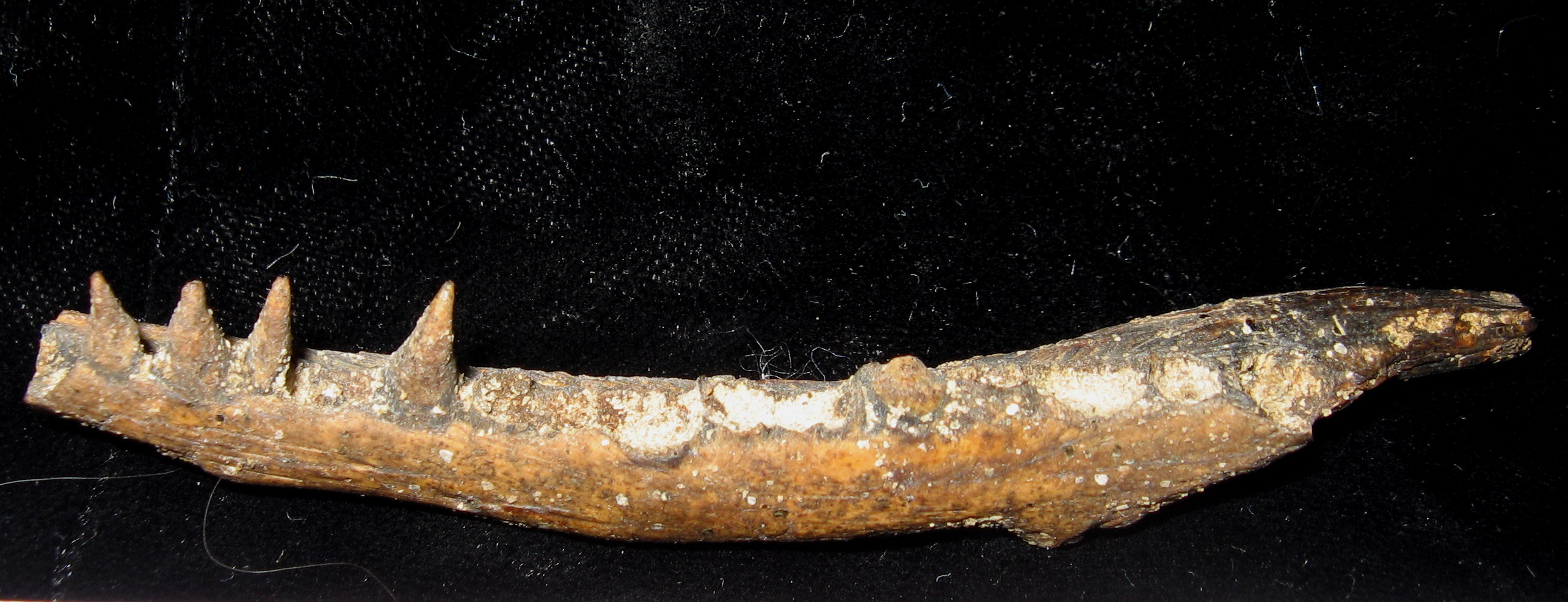
Rhabdofario lacustris

- **Rachycentron**^{[Sepkoski 2002]}
- **Radulinus**^{[Sepkoski 2002]}
- †Ramallichthys^{[Sepkoski 2002]}
- †Ramphosus^{[Sepkoski 2002]}
- **Raniceps**^{[Sepkoski 2002]}
- †Rankinian^{[Sepkoski 2002]}
- †Rebellatrix
- †Retodus
- **Rexea**^{[Sepkoski 2002]}
- †Rhabdoderma^{[Sepkoski 2002]}
- †Rhabdofario^{[Sepkoski 2002]}
- †Rhabdolepis^{[Sepkoski 2002]}
- **Rhacochilus**^{[Sepkoski 2002]}
- †Rhacolepis^{[Sepkoski 2002]}
- †Rhadinichthys^{[Sepkoski 2002]}
- †Rhamphexocoetus^{[Sepkoski 2002]}
- †Rhamphognathus^{[Sepkoski 2002]}
- †Rhamphoichthys
- †Rharbichthys^{[Sepkoski 2002]}
- **Rhechias**^{[Sepkoski 2002]}
- †Rhenanoperca^{[Sepkoski 2002]}
- †Rhinocephalus^{[Sepkoski 2002]}
- †Rhinodipterus^{[Sepkoski 2002]}
- †Rhipis
- †Rhizodus^{[Sepkoski 2002]}
- **Rhynchoconger**^{[Sepkoski 2002]}
- †Rhynchocymba^{[Sepkoski 2002]}
- †Rhynchodercetis^{[Sepkoski 2002]}
- †Rhynchodipterus
- †Rhynchorinus^{[Sepkoski 2002]}
- †Rhythmias^{[Sepkoski 2002]}
- †Robustichthys
- **Roncador**^{[Sepkoski 2002]}
- †Roslerichthys
- †Rubiesichthys^{[Sepkoski 2002]}

== S ==
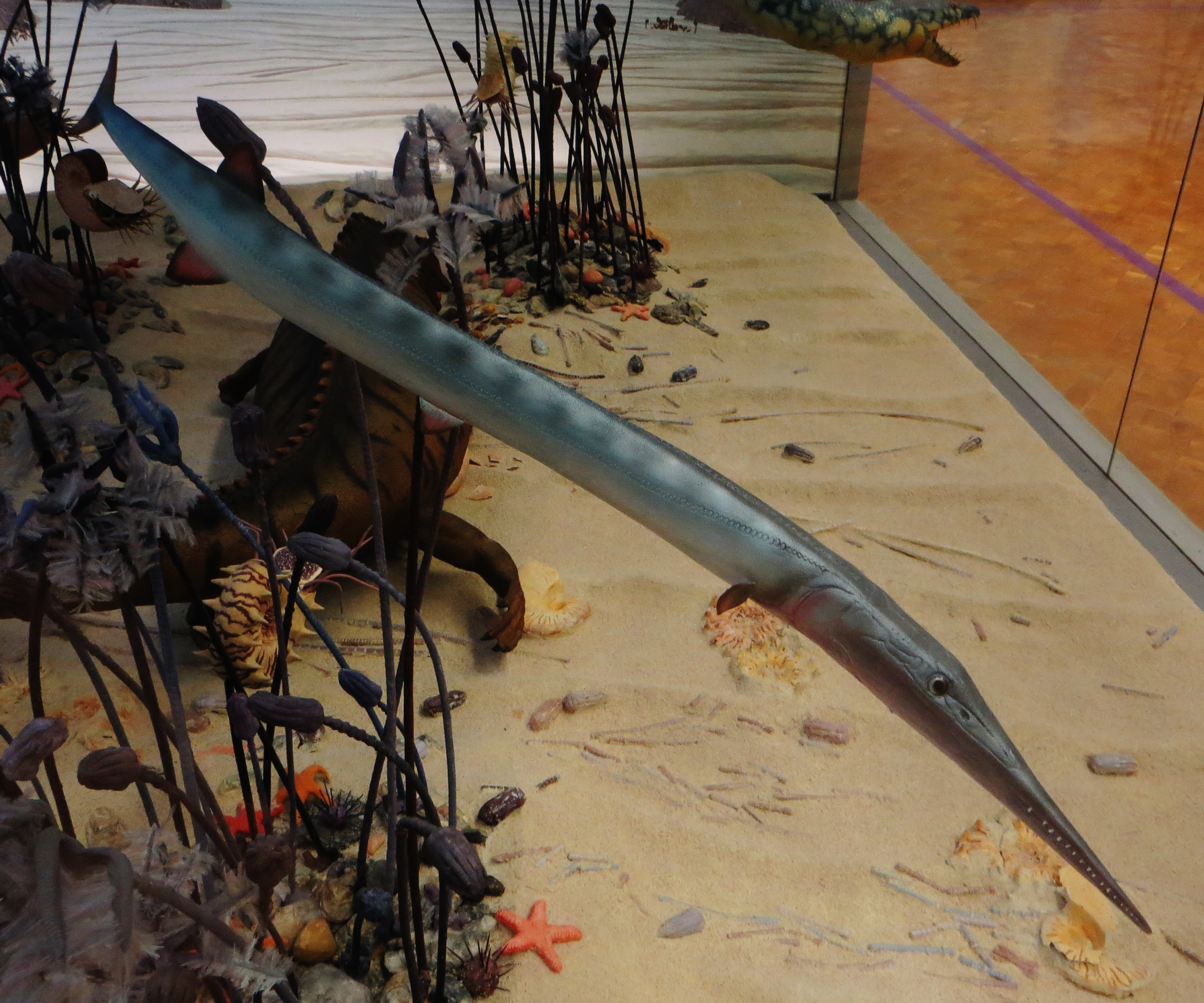
Saurichthys model

- **Saccogaster**^{[Sepkoski 2002]}
- †Sahelinia^{[Sepkoski 2002]}
- †Sakamenichthys^{[Sepkoski 2002]}
- †Salminops^{[Sepkoski 2002]}
- **Salmo**^{[Sepkoski 2002]}
- **Salvelinus**^{[Sepkoski 2002]}
- †Sangiorgioichthys
- †Santanaclupea
- **Sarda**^{[Sepkoski 2002]}
- **Sardina**^{[Sepkoski 2002]}
- **Sardinella**^{[Sepkoski 2002]}
- †Sardinioides
- †Sardinius^{[Sepkoski 2002]}
- ✝Sardinioides^{[Sepkoski 2002]}
- **Sardinops**^{[Sepkoski 2002]}
- **Sargocentron**^{[Sepkoski 2002]}
- †Sargodon^{[Sepkoski 2002]}
- **Sargus**^{[Sepkoski 2002]}
- **Sarmatella**^{[Sepkoski 2002]}
- †Sassenia^{[Sepkoski 2002]}
- ✝Saurichthyes^{[Sepkoski 2002]}
- †Saurichthys
- **Saurida**^{[Sepkoski 2002]}
- †Saurocephalus^{[Sepkoski 2002]}
- †Saurodon^{[Sepkoski 2002]}
- †Sauropsis^{[Sepkoski 2002]}
- †Saurorhamphus^{[Sepkoski 2002]}
- †Saurorhynchus^{[Sepkoski 2002]}
- †Saurostomus^{[Sepkoski 2002]}
- **Scalanago**^{[Sepkoski 2002]}
- †Scanilepis^{[Sepkoski 2002]}
- **Scarus**^{[Sepkoski 2002]}
- **Scatophagus**^{[Sepkoski 2002]}
- †Schaefferius
- †Scheenstia
- †Schizurichthys
- **Sciaena**^{[Sepkoski 2002]}
- **Sciaenops**^{[Sepkoski 2002]}
- †Sciaenuropsis
- †Sciaenurus^{[Sepkoski 2002]}
- ✝Sciaenuropsis^{[Sepkoski 2002]}
- †Scleracanthus^{[Sepkoski 2002]}
- **Scomber**^{[Sepkoski 2002]}
- **Scomberesox**^{[Sepkoski 2002]}
- **Scomberoides**^{[Sepkoski 2002]}
- **Scomberomorus**^{[Sepkoski 2002]}
- †Scombramphodon^{[Sepkoski 2002]}
- †Scombrinus^{[Sepkoski 2002]}
- †Scombroclupea^{[Sepkoski 2002]}
- **Scombrops**^{[Sepkoski 2002]}
- †Scombrosarda (extance disputed^{[Sepkoski 2002]})
- †Scombrosphyraena^{[Sepkoski 2002]}
- **Scopelarchus**^{[Sepkoski 2002]}
- **Scopelogadus**^{[Sepkoski 2002]}
- †Scopeloides^{[Sepkoski 2002]}
- **Scopelopsis**^{[Sepkoski 2002]}
- **Scopelosaurus**^{[Sepkoski 2002]}
- **Scophthalmus**^{[Sepkoski 2002]}
- †Scopulipiscis
- **Scorpaena**^{[Sepkoski 2002]}
- **Scorpaenichthys**^{[Sepkoski 2002]}
- **Sebastes**^{[Sepkoski 2002]}
- †Sebastodes (extance disputed^{[Sepkoski 2002]})
- †Sedenhorstia^{[Sepkoski 2002]}
- †Seefeldia^{[Sepkoski 2002]}
- **Selar**^{[Sepkoski 2002]}
- **Selenaspis**^{[Sepkoski 2002]}
- †Semiolepis
- †Semionotus^{[Sepkoski 2002]}
- †Seriola (extance disputed^{[Sepkoski 2002]})
- **Seriphus**^{[Sepkoski 2002]}
- †Serranopsis^{[Sepkoski 2002]}
- **Serranus**^{[Sepkoski 2002]}
- †Serrolepis^{[Sepkoski 2002]}
- †Siganopygaeus^{[Sepkoski 2002]}
- **Sillaginoides**^{[Sepkoski 2002]}
- **Sillago**^{[Sepkoski 2002]}
- †Sinocoelacanthus^{[Sepkoski 2002]}
- †Sinoeugnathus^{[Sepkoski 2002]}
- †Sinoniscus^{[Sepkoski 2002]}
- †Sinosemionotus^{[Sepkoski 2002]}
- **Sirembo**^{[Sepkoski 2002]}
- †Smilodonichthys^{[Sepkoski 2002]}
- **Solea**^{[Sepkoski 2002]}
- †Solenorhynchus^{[Sepkoski 2002]}
- **Solenostomus**^{[Sepkoski 2002]}
- †Songanella^{[Sepkoski 2002]}
- **Sparisoma**^{[Sepkoski 2002]}
- †Sparnodus^{[Sepkoski 2002]}
- **Sparus**^{[Sepkoski 2002]}
- †Spathiurus^{[Sepkoski 2002]}
- †Spermatodus
- †Sphaerolepis
- ✝Sphathiurus^{[Sepkoski 2002]}
- †Sphenocephalus^{[Sepkoski 2002]}
- **Sphyraena**^{[Sepkoski 2002]}
- †Sphyraenodus^{[Sepkoski 2002]}
- **Sphyraenops**^{[Sepkoski 2002]}
- **Spicara**^{[Sepkoski 2002]}
- †Spinacanthus^{[Sepkoski 2002]}
- **Spirinchus**^{[Sepkoski 2002]}
- †Sponysedrion^{[Sepkoski 2002]}
- †Spratticeps
- **Squalogadus**^{[Sepkoski 2002]}
- †Stegotrachelus^{[Sepkoski 2002]}
- †Stemmatodus^{[Sepkoski 2002]}
- **Stenatherina**^{[Sepkoski 2002]}
- **Stenobrachius**^{[Sepkoski 2002]}
- †Stensioonotus^{[Sepkoski 2002]}
- **Sternoptyx**^{[Sepkoski 2002]}
- †Stichoberyx^{[Sepkoski 2002]}
- †Stichocentrus^{[Sepkoski 2002]}
- †Stichopterus^{[Sepkoski 2002]}
- †Stichopteryx^{[Sepkoski 2002]}
- **Stolephorus**^{[Sepkoski 2002]}
- †Stomiahykus^{[Sepkoski 2002]}
- †Stoppania
- †Stratodus^{[Sepkoski 2002]}
- †Strepeoschema^{[Sepkoski 2002]}
- **Stromateus**^{[Sepkoski 2002]}
- †Stromerichthys^{[Sepkoski 2002]}
- †Strongylosteus^{[Sepkoski 2002]}
- †Strunius^{[Sepkoski 2002]}
- †Styloichthyes
- †Styracopterus^{[Sepkoski 2002]}
- †Suius
- †Sundayichthys^{[Sepkoski 2002]}
- **Symbolophorus**^{[Sepkoski 2002]}
- **Symphodus**^{[Sepkoski 2002]}
- **Symphurus**^{[Sepkoski 2002]}
- **Synagrops**^{[Sepkoski 2002]}
- ✝Synaptotylus^{[Sepkoski 2002]}
- **Syngnathus**^{[Sepkoski 2002]}
- †Synhypuralis^{[Sepkoski 2002]}
- **Synodus**^{[Sepkoski 2002]}
- †Syntengmodus^{[Sepkoski 2002]}

== T ==
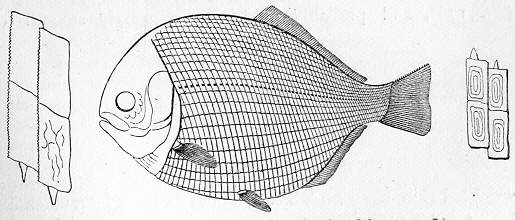
Tetragonolepis

- †Tachynectes^{[Sepkoski 2002]}
- **Taenioconger**^{[Sepkoski 2002]}
- †Tanyrhinichthys
- **Tarletonbeania**^{[Sepkoski 2002]}
- †Tarrasius^{[Sepkoski 2002]}
- †Teffichthys
- †Tegeolepis^{[Sepkoski 2002]}
- †Telepholis^{[Sepkoski 2002]}
- †Tenuicentrum^{[Sepkoski 2002]}
- **Teratichthys**^{[Sepkoski 2002]}
- †Tetragonolepis^{[Sepkoski 2002]}
- **Tetragonurus**^{[Sepkoski 2002]}
- **Tetraodon**^{[Sepkoski 2002]}
- †Tetrapterus (extance disputed^{[Sepkoski 2002]})
- †Thalattorhynchus^{[Sepkoski 2002]}
- †Tharrhias^{[Sepkoski 2002]}
- †Tharsis^{[Sepkoski 2002]}
- †Thaumaturus^{[Sepkoski 2002]}
- **Theragra**^{[Sepkoski 2002]}
- †Thomasinotus^{[Sepkoski 2002]}
- †Thoracopterus^{[Sepkoski 2002]}
- †Thrissops^{[Sepkoski 2002]}
- **Thunnus**^{[Sepkoski 2002]}
- †Thursius^{[Sepkoski 2002]}
- **Thymallus**^{[Sepkoski 2002]}
- †Thyrsion^{[Sepkoski 2002]}
- †Thyrsitocephalus^{[Sepkoski 2002]}
- †Thyrsocles^{[Sepkoski 2002]}
- †Tibetodus^{[Sepkoski 2002]}
- †Ticinepomis^{[Sepkoski 2002]}
- †Ticinolepis
- †Tienshaniscus^{[Sepkoski 2002]}
- †Tiktaalik
- †Todiltia^{[Sepkoski 2002]}
- **Toxotes**^{[Sepkoski 2002]}
- †Trachelacanthus^{[Sepkoski 2002]}
- †Trachicaranx^{[Sepkoski 2002]}
- †Trachichythyoides^{[Sepkoski 2002]}
- **Trachinus**^{[Sepkoski 2002]}
- **Trachurus**^{[Sepkoski 2002]}
- †Trachymetopon
- **Trachyrhinchus**^{[Sepkoski 2002]}
- †Trewavasia^{[Sepkoski 2002]}
- **Triacanthus**^{[Sepkoski 2002]}
- †Trichiurichthys^{[Sepkoski 2002]}
- **Trichiurus**^{[Sepkoski 2002]}
- †Trichurides^{[Sepkoski 2002]}
- **Trigla**^{[Sepkoski 2002]}
- †Trigonodon^{[Sepkoski 2002]}
- **Triodon**^{[Sepkoski 2002]}
- †Tripelta^{[Sepkoski 2002]}
- **Triphoturus**^{[Sepkoski 2002]}
- **Tripterophycis**^{[Sepkoski 2002]}
- **Tripterygion**^{[Sepkoski 2002]}
- **Trisopterus**^{[Sepkoski 2002]}
- †Tselfatia^{[Sepkoski 2002]}
- †Tubantia^{[Sepkoski 2002]}
- †Tungtingichthys^{[Sepkoski 2002]}
- †Tungusichthys^{[Sepkoski 2002]}
- †Tunita^{[Sepkoski 2002]}
- †Turahbuglossus^{[Sepkoski 2002]}
- †Turkmene^{[Sepkoski 2002]}
- †Turseodus
- †Tylerichthys^{[Sepkoski 2002]}

== U ==
- †Uarbryichthys
- ✝Uarbyichthys^{[Sepkoski 2002]}
- †Uighuroniscus
- **Umbra**^{[Sepkoski 2002]}
- **Umbrina**^{[Sepkoski 2002]}
- †Undina^{[Sepkoski 2002]}
- †Uranolophus^{[Sepkoski 2002]}
- **Uranoscopus**^{[Sepkoski 2002]}
- †Urenchelys^{[Sepkoski 2002]}
- **Uroconger**^{[Sepkoski 2002]}
- **Urophycis**^{[Sepkoski 2002]}
- †Urosphen^{[Sepkoski 2002]}
- †Urosphenopsis^{[Sepkoski 2002]}
- †Urosthenes^{[Sepkoski 2002]}
- †Usclasichthys
- †Uydenia^{[Sepkoski 2002]}
- †Uydenichthys

== V ==
- **Valenciennellus**^{[Sepkoski 2002]}
- †Varasichthys^{[Sepkoski 2002]}
- †Varialepis
- **Velifer** (extance disputed^{[Sepkoski 2002]})
- **Ventrifossa**^{[Sepkoski 2002]}
- **Verilus**^{[Sepkoski 2002]}
- †Veronanguilla^{[Sepkoski 2002]}
- †Veronavelifer
- **Vinciguerria**^{[Sepkoski 2002]}
- †Vinctifer^{[Sepkoski 2002]}
- †Volcichthys^{[Sepkoski 2002]}
- †Voltaconger^{[Sepkoski 2002]}
- †Vomeropsis^{[Sepkoski 2002]}

== W ==
- †Wadeichthys^{[Sepkoski 2002]}
- †Wangia^{[Sepkoski 2002]}
- †Wardichthys^{[Sepkoski 2002]}
- ✝Watsonichthyes^{[Sepkoski 2002]}
- †Watsonichthys
- †Watsonulus^{[Sepkoski 2002]}
- †Wendyichths^{[Sepkoski 2002]}
- †Westollia^{[Sepkoski 2002]}
- †Wetherellus^{[Sepkoski 2002]}
- †Whitapodus^{[Sepkoski 2002]}
- †Whiteia^{[Sepkoski 2002]}
- †Whiteichthys^{[Sepkoski 2002]}
- †Willomorichthys^{[Sepkoski 2002]}
- †Wimania^{[Sepkoski 2002]}
- ✝Woodwardella^{[Sepkoski 2002]}

== X ==
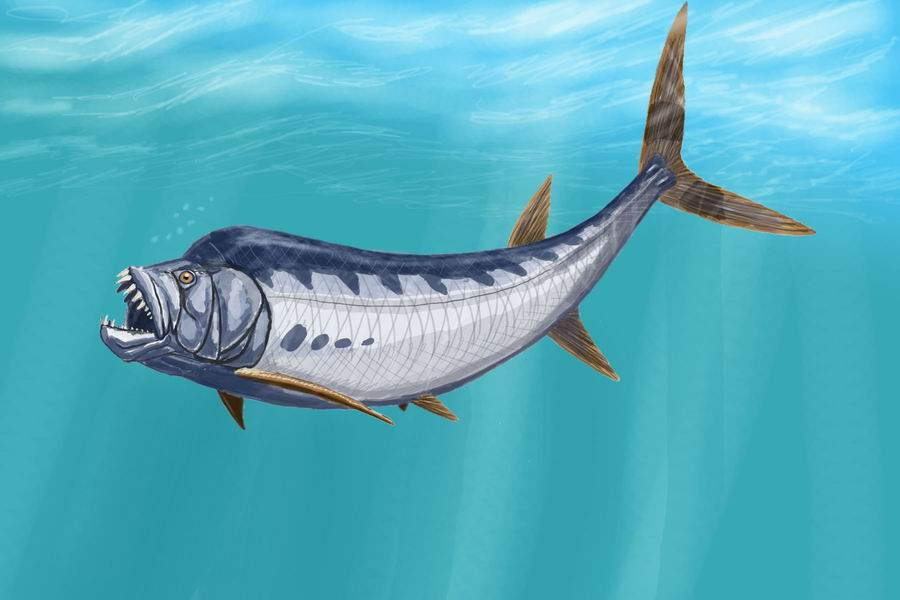
Xiphactinus

- **Xenistius**^{[Sepkoski 2002]}
- †Xingyia
- †Xiphactinus^{[Sepkoski 2002]}
- **Xiphias**^{[Sepkoski 2002]}
- †Xiphiorhynchus^{[Sepkoski 2002]}
- †Xiphopterus^{[Sepkoski 2002]}
- †Xyne^{[Sepkoski 2002]}

== Y ==
- †Yaomoshania
- †Yelangichthys
- ✝Yonngichthys^{[Sepkoski 2002]}
- †Youngichthys
- †Youngolepis^{[Sepkoski 2002]}
- †Yuchoulepis^{[Sepkoski 2002]}
- †Yungkangichthys
- †Yunnancoelacanthus

== Z ==
Zoarces viviparus is a modern species of the genus Zoarces

- †Zanclites^{[Sepkoski 2002]}
- **Zanclus**^{[Sepkoski 2002]}
- **Zaniolepis**^{[Sepkoski 2002]}
- †Zaphlegulus^{[Sepkoski 2002]}
- **Zenion**^{[Sepkoski 2002]}
- **Zenopsis**^{[Sepkoski 2002]}
- †Zeuchthiscus^{[Sepkoski 2002]}
- **Zeus**^{[Sepkoski 2002]}
- †Zignoichthys^{[Sepkoski 2002]}
- **Zoarces**^{[Sepkoski 2002]}

== See also ==
- Bony fish
- Prehistoric fish
- List of sarcopterygians
- List of prehistoric cartilaginous fish
- List of prehistoric jawless fish
