= Prevolitans =

Scientific classification
- Kingdom: Animalia
- Phylum: Chordata
- Class: Actinopterygii
- Genus: †Prevolitans; Gayet & Barbin, 1986

Extinct genus of fishes

Prevolitans is an extinct genus of prehistoric bony fish.

== See also ==
- Prehistoric fish
- List of prehistoric bony fish
