= Myroconger gracilis =

Scientific classification
- Kingdom: Animalia
- Phylum: Chordata
- Class: Actinopterygii
- Order: Anguilliformes
- Family: Myrocongridae
- Genus: Myroconger
- Species: M. gracilis

Binomial name
- Myroconger gracilis Castle, 1991

Species of fish

Myroconger gracilis is an eel in the family Myrocongridae (thin eels). It was described by Peter Henry John Castle in 1991. It is a marine, deep-water dwelling eel which is known from the Kyushu–Palau Ridge in the northwestern Pacific Ocean. It dwells at a depth range of 320–640 m. Females are known to reach a maximum standard length of 47.7 cm.

The species epithet gracilis refers to the slender body of the eel in comparison to Myroconger compressus (red eel).
