= Myroconger prolixus =

Scientific classification
- Kingdom: Animalia
- Phylum: Chordata
- Class: Actinopterygii
- Order: Anguilliformes
- Family: Myrocongridae
- Genus: Myroconger
- Species: M. prolixus

Binomial name
- Myroconger prolixus Castle & Béarez, 1995

Species of fish

Myroconger prolixus is an eel in the family Myrocongridae (thin eels). It was described by Peter Henry John Castle and Philippe Béarez in 1995. It is a marine, deep-water dwelling eel which was described from a female specimen and ova taken from the Kaiyo Maru Seamount off of New Caledonia, in the western Pacific Ocean. It is known to dwell at a depth range of 260–280 m. The holotype specimen measured a total length of 38.3 cm.

The species epithet prolixus means "long bodied" in Latin.
