= Myroconger seychellensis =

Scientific classification
- Kingdom: Animalia
- Phylum: Chordata
- Class: Actinopterygii
- Order: Anguilliformes
- Family: Myrocongridae
- Genus: Myroconger
- Species: M. seychellensis

Binomial name
- Myroconger seychellensis Karmovskaya, 2006

Species of fish

Myroconger seychellensis is an eel in the family Myrocongridae (thin eels) described by Emma Stanislavovna Karmovskaya in 2006. It is a marine, deep-water dwelling eel known from Seychelles in the Indian Ocean (from which its species epithet is derived). It is known to dwell at a maximum depth of 200 m. Females can reach a maximum total length of 45 cm.
