= Orange eel =

Scientific classification
- Kingdom: Animalia
- Phylum: Chordata
- Class: Actinopterygii
- Order: Anguilliformes
- Family: Myrocongridae
- Genus: Myroconger
- Species: M. nigrodentatus

Binomial name
- Myroconger nigrodentatus Castle & Béarez, 1995

Species of fish

The orange eel (Myroconger nigrodentatus) is an eel in the family Myrocongridae (thin eels). It was described by Peter Henry John Castle and Philippe Béarez in 1995. It is a tropical, marine eel known from the Pacific Ocean near Costa Rica and Ecuador. It dwells at a depth range of 50–250 m. Females are known to reach a maximum total length of 36.6 cm.

The species epithet refers to the dark brown or black pigment of the internal jaw. Despite limited known distribution, the IUCN redlist currently lists the orange eel as Least Concern, due to the possibility of a wider distribution, observations that the species is not rare, and a lack of known threats.
