= Monognathus boehlkei =

Conservation status
- Data Deficient (IUCN 3.1)

Scientific classification
- Kingdom: Animalia
- Phylum: Chordata
- Class: Actinopterygii
- Order: Anguilliformes
- Family: Monognathidae
- Genus: Monognathus
- Species: M. boehlkei

Binomial name
- Monognathus boehlkei Bertelsen & J. G. Nielsen, 1987

Species of fish

Monognathus boehlkei is a deep-sea eel inhabiting all oceans at depths up to 2,000 metres (6,600 ft). Little is known of this species.

== Description ==
The species is characterized by a distinctive high number of anal fin rays and a short, blunt head with a straight lower jaw. It is unpigmented or transparent, with five or six spots of pigment along the body. Individuals are sized at around 55–70 millimetres (2.2–2.8 in) in length.

== Distribution ==
Monognathus boehlkei is found mainly in the eastern and western Atlantic ocean.

== Etymology ==
The fish is named in honor of James E. Böhlke (1930–1982), of the Academy of Natural Sciences of Philadelphia, because of his valuable contribution to the study of the apodal fishes.
