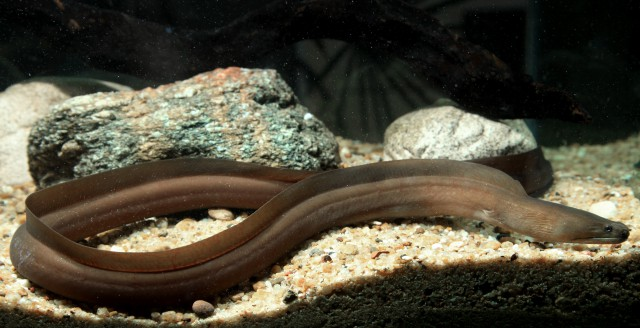
- Strophidon sathete

Scientific classification
- Kingdom: Animalia
- Phylum: Chordata
- Class: Actinopterygii
- Division: Teleostei
- Order: Anguilliformes
- Family: Muraenidae
- Subfamily: Muraeninae
- Genus: Strophidon; McClelland, 1944

Type species
- Lycodontis longicaudata McClelland, 1844

Species
- See text

Synonyms
- Evenchelys Jordan & Evermann, 1902

= Strophidon =

Genus of eels

Strophidon is a genus of eels in the family Muraenidae. The genus has a wide distribution throughout the Pacific and Indian Oceans where they mostly inhabit the benthic zone.

== Species ==
The following species in Strophidon are recognized by FishBase:

- Strophidon dorsalis (Seale, 1917)
- Strophidon sathete (Hamilton, 1822)
- Strophidon dawydoffi Prokofiev, 2020

Two other species, S. tetraporus, and S. ui, have been described but not presently accepted by FishBase.
