= Stictorhinus =

Scientific classification
- Kingdom: Animalia
- Phylum: Chordata
- Class: Actinopterygii
- Order: Anguilliformes
- Family: Ophichthidae
- Subfamily: Ophichthinae
- Genus: Stictorhinus; J. E. Böhlke & McCosker, 1975
- Species: S. potamius

Binomial name
- Stictorhinus potamius J. E. Böhlke & McCosker, 1975

Species of fish

Stictorhinus potamius is a species of freshwater eel in the family Ophichthidae. It is the only member of its genus. It is found in the major river basins of Brazil.
