= Bolcanguilla =

Bolcanguilla Temporal range: Early Eocene

Scientific classification
- Domain: Eukaryota
- Kingdom: Animalia
- Phylum: Chordata
- Class: Actinopterygii
- Order: Anguilliformes
- Genus: †Bolcanguilla; Blot, 1980
- Species: †B. brachycephala

Binomial name
- †Bolcanguilla brachycephala Blot, 1980

Extinct genus of fishes

Bolcanguilla is an extinct genus of prehistoric marine eel that lived during the early division of the Eocene epoch. It contains a single species, B. brachycephala from the Monte Bolca site of Italy. Its exact taxonomic affinities within the Anguilliformes remain uncertain.

== See also ==
- Prehistoric fish
- List of prehistoric bony fish
