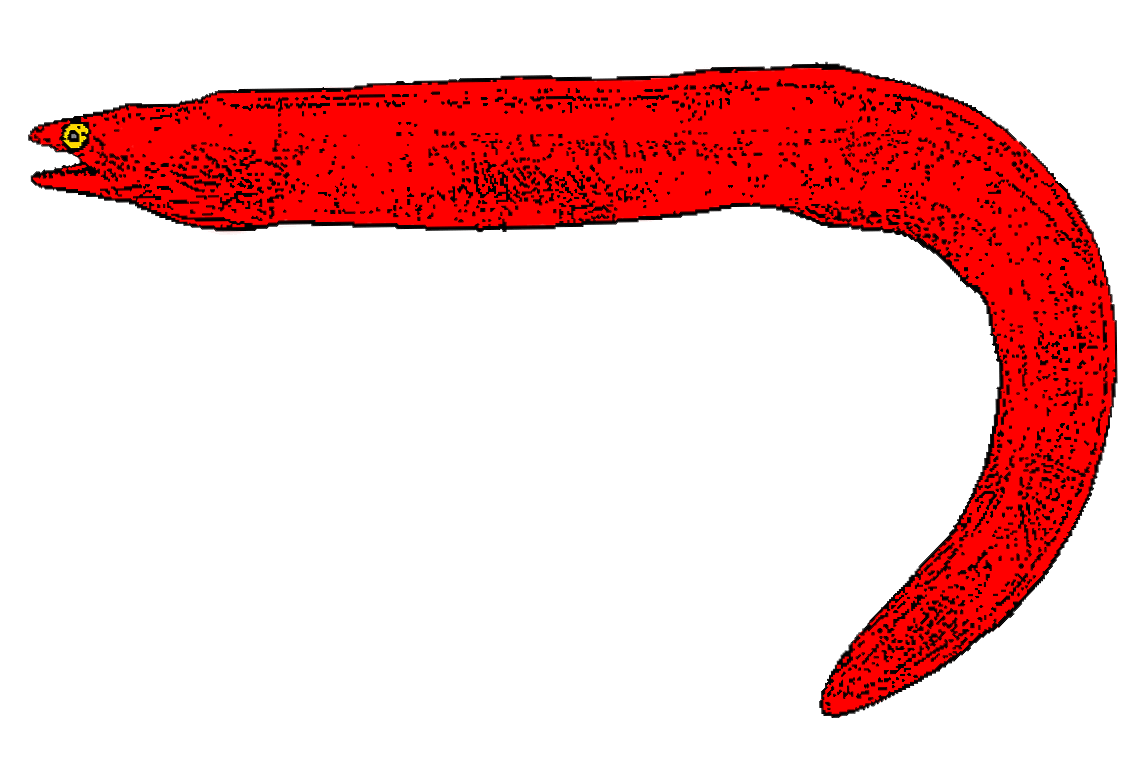

Conservation status
- Data Deficient (IUCN 3.1)

Scientific classification
- Kingdom: Animalia
- Phylum: Chordata
- Class: Actinopterygii
- Order: Anguilliformes
- Family: Myrocongridae
- Genus: Myroconger
- Species: M. compressus

Binomial name
- Myroconger compressus Günther, 1870

Synonyms
- Mycroconger compressus Günther, 1870 (misspelling)

= Red eel =

Species of fish

The red eel (Myroconger compressus) is an eel in the family Myrocongridae (thin eels). It was described by Albert Günther in 1870. It is a tropical, marine eel known from the eastern Atlantic Ocean, including St. Helena, Dakar, Senegal, and possibly São Tomé and Principe. Males are known to reach a maximum total length of 53.8 cm. These eel are classified as teleost fish, meaning they belong to a group of fish that comprises ray-finned fish. These fins aid the eel in gliding through the water faster or crawling on the ocean floor.
