= Myroconger =

Scientific classification
- Domain: Eukaryota
- Kingdom: Animalia
- Phylum: Chordata
- Class: Actinopterygii
- Order: Anguilliformes
- Suborder: Muraenoidei
- Family: Myrocongridae; T. N. Gill, 1890
- Genus: Myroconger; Günther, 1870

Type species
- Myroconger compressus Günther, 1870

Species
- 6, see text.

Genus of fishes

Myroconger is the only genus of eels, the thin eels, in the family Myrocongridae. Very little is known about the group.

Until recently, only a single specimen from this family was known. This individual had been caught off Saint Helena in 1868. In the 1990s and 2000s, deep-sea submersibles identified several more individuals, including four further species. The first known species, M. compressus, was bright red in colour, but not all other species share this trait.

== Species ==
The currently recognized species in this genus are:

- Myroconger compressus Günther, 1870 (red eel)
- Myroconger gracilis Castle, 1991
- Myroconger nigrodentatus Castle & Béarez, 1995 (orange eel)
- Myroconger pietschi Espíndola, Caires, Tighe, De Pinna & De Melo, 2021
- Myroconger prolixus Castle & Béarez, 1995
- Myroconger seychellensis Karmovskaya, 2006
