= Gazolapodus =

Gazolapodus Temporal range: Early Eocene

Scientific classification
- Kingdom: Animalia
- Phylum: Chordata
- Class: Actinopterygii
- Order: Anguilliformes
- Genus: †Gazolapodus; Blot, 1981
- Species: †G. homopterus

Binomial name
- †Gazolapodus homopterus Blot, 1981

Extinct genus of fishes

Gazolapodus is an extinct genus of prehistoric marine eel that lived during the early division of the Eocene epoch. It contains a single species, G. homopterus from the Monte Bolca site of Italy. Its exact taxonomic affinities within the Anguilliformes remain uncertain.

== See also ==
- Prehistoric fish
- List of prehistoric bony fish
