= Monognathus ahlstromi =

Conservation status
- Data Deficient (IUCN 3.1)

Scientific classification
- Kingdom: Animalia
- Phylum: Chordata
- Class: Actinopterygii
- Order: Anguilliformes
- Family: Monognathidae
- Genus: Monognathus
- Species: M. ahlstromi

Binomial name
- Monognathus ahlstromi Raju, 1974

Species of fish

Monognathus ahlstromi, the paddletail onejaw, is an ocean-dwelling eel found in the North Pacific Ocean off of the coast of the United States. It is found up to a depth of 2,000 m (6,600 ft). It does not provide parental care. Little information is currently known about its habits or full distribution.

== Description ==
The dorsal and anal fins of Monognathus ahlstromi lack bony supports.

== Etymology ==
The fish is named in honor of ichthyologist Elbert H. Ahlstrom (1910–1979), of the Southwest Fisheries Center, of the National Marine Fisheries Service, who critically reviewed Raju's manuscript before publication.
