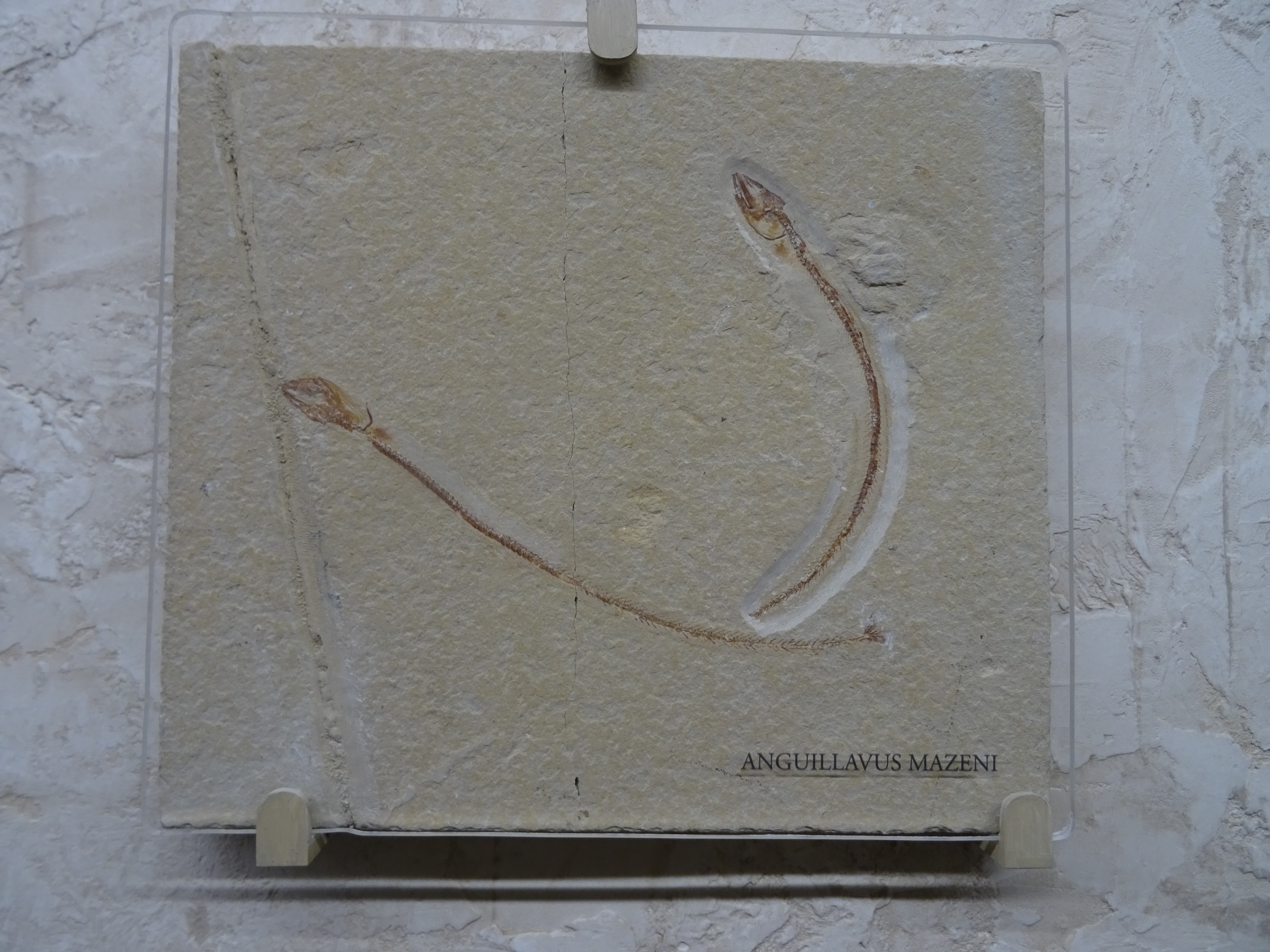
- Specimens of A. mazeni at the MIM Museum

Scientific classification
- Kingdom: Animalia
- Phylum: Chordata
- Class: Actinopterygii
- Order: Anguilliformes
- Family: †Anguillavidae; Hay, 1903
- Genus: †Anguillavus; Hay, 1903

Type species
- Anguillavus quadripinnis Hay, 1903

Species
- A. mazeni Belouze et al. 2003; A. quadripinnis Hay, 1903

= Anguillavus =

Anguillavus Temporal range: Upper Cenomanian

Extinct genus of fishes

Anguillavus (Latin for "eel ancestor") is an extinct genus of basal marine eel that lived during the Late Cretaceous (upper Cenomanian) of Lebanon, where it is known from the Sannine Formation.

It is the only known member of the family Anguillavidae. Its primitive nature compared to extant eels is indicated by it still retaining its pelvic fins, which have been lost in modern eels. As with modern eels, it lacked scales, but appears to have had a row of enlarged plates along its sides.

It has two species:

- A. mazeni Belouze et al. 2003
- A. quadripinnis Hay, 1903

The species A. bathshebae (named after Bathsheba), also described by Hay (1903), was synonymized with A. quadripinnis in 2003.

In 1920, another fossil ray-finned fish from Cenomanian-aged marine strata in Kansas was initially also considered an eel like Anguillavus, and was described as Anguillavus hackberryensis Martin, 1922. In 1981, the holotype of "A." hackberryensis was reexamined, and found to not group with the rest of the genus, but rather be a dercetid aulopiform fish. Robins (1989) went as far as classifying Anguillavus as a whole as not an eel. However, later studies have firmly refuted this, and have consistently recovered Anguillavus as a stem-eel.
