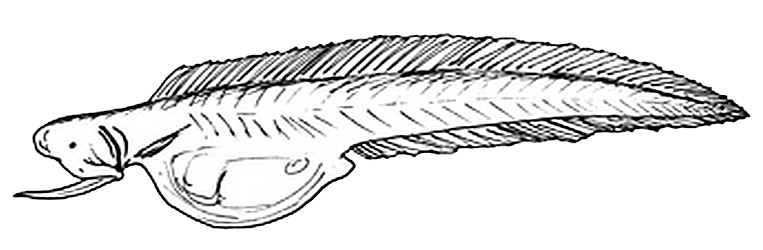
- M. jesperseni

Scientific classification
- Kingdom: Animalia
- Phylum: Chordata
- Class: Actinopterygii
- Order: Anguilliformes
- Suborder: Anguilloidei
- Family: Monognathidae; Trewavas, 1937
- Genus: Monognathus; Bertin, 1936

Species
- 15, see text.

Synonyms
- Phasmatostoma Myers, 1940

= Monognathus =

Genus of fishes

Monognathus, or onejaw, is the only genus of the family Monognathidae of deep-sea eels. The name comes from the Greek monos meaning "one" and gnathos meaning "jaw", a reference to the large mouth in comparison with the rest of the fish, and also the absence of an upper jaw (maxilla and premaxilla bones are absent).

== Description ==
The dorsal and anal fins lack bony supports and the pectoral fins are missing. The snout has a fang connected to glands, which are venomous in adults. These eels are virtually blind, with rudimentary eyes and small olfactory organs, although the male olfactory organs are enlarged, perhaps suggesting a method of "sniffing out" a mate.

Typical lengths are from 4 to 10 cm (1.5–4 in), the maximum length recorded is 15.9 cm (6.3 in).

== Distribution ==
They are found at depths of over 2,000 m (6,600 ft), and are found in all oceans.

== Species ==
The fifteen known species are:

- Monognathus ahlstromi Raju, 1974 (Paddletail onejaw)
- Monognathus berteli J. G. Nielsen & Hartel, 1996.
- Monognathus bertini Bertelsen & J. G. Nielsen, 1987.
- Monognathus boehlkei Bertelsen & J. G. Nielsen, 1987.
- Monognathus bruuni Bertin, 1936.
- Monognathus herringi Bertelsen & J. G. Nielsen, 1987.
- Monognathus isaacsi Raju, 1974.
- Monognathus jesperseni Bertin, 1936.
- Monognathus jesse Raju, 1974.
- Monognathus nigeli Bertelsen & J. G. Nielsen, 1987.
- Monognathus ozawai Bertelsen & J. G. Nielsen, 1987.
- Monognathus rajui Bertelsen & J. G. Nielsen, 1987.
- Monognathus rosenblatti Bertelsen & J. G. Nielsen, 1987.
- Monognathus smithi Bertelsen & J. G. Nielsen, 1987.
- Monognathus taningi Bertin, 1936.
