= Elver pass =

Waterway modification for eels

An elver pass or eel pass is a narrow channel constructed in a waterway to enable the passage of eels and elvers (juvenile eels) past obstructions and barriers such as manmade weirs.

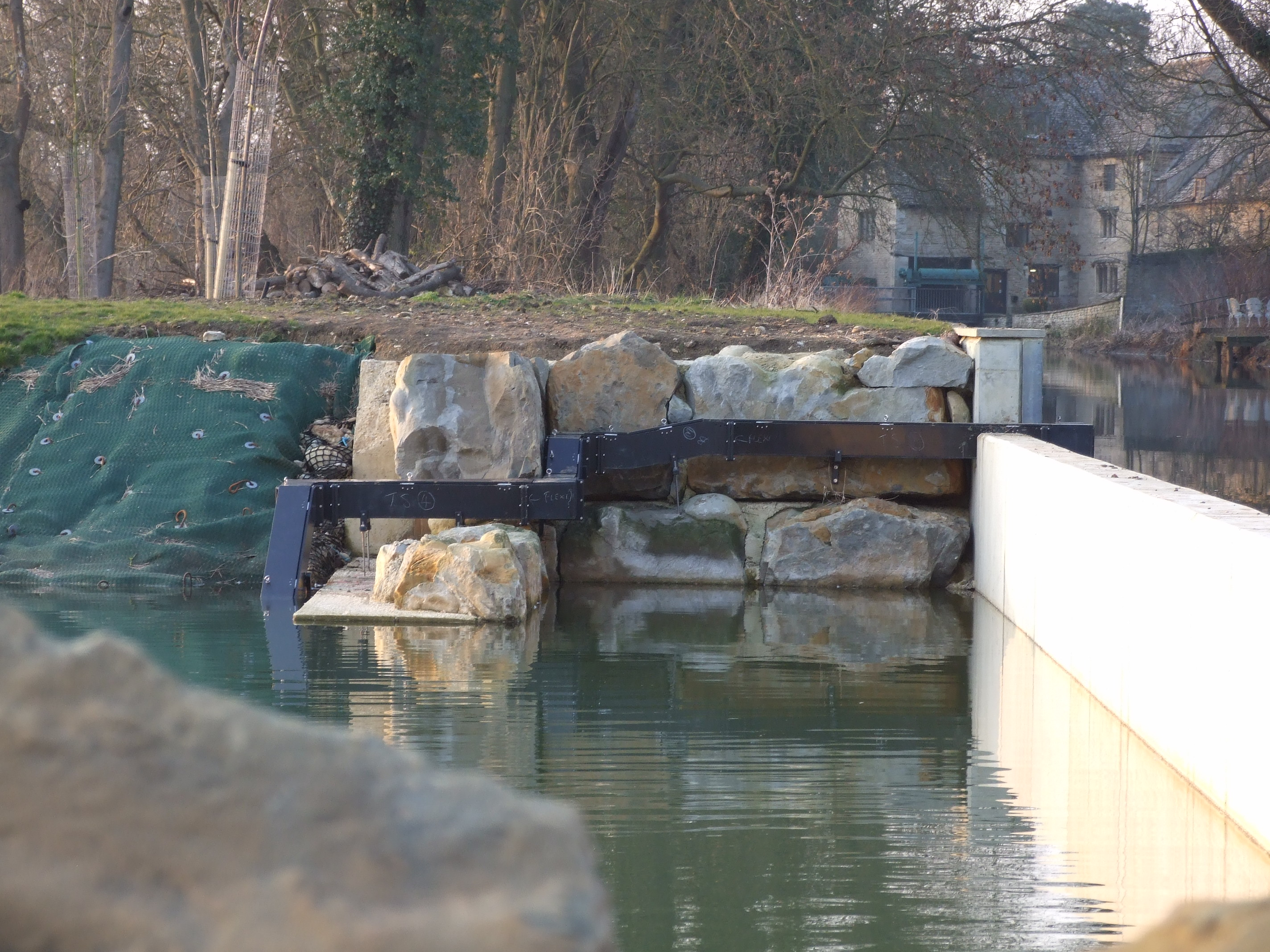
River Welland Elver Pass at Duddington

== Construction ==
The UK Environment Agency has guidelines for the design of eel and elver passes for employment in weirs, tidal flaps & gates and sluice structures. A variety of materials for example HDPE and stainless steel are used to construct brush and bristle surfaces, pipes, ducts, mouse holes, cat flaps and pet door types of eel and elver passes.

Eel and elver passes are distinctive from fish ladders which in turn are distinct from eel ladders. The eel ladder is constructed by introducing steps or uprights. Each step or upright of the eel ladder interrupts the flow of water at each point in the ladder. In contrast, eel and elver passes are distinct by either employing a tube which bypasses the main flow or current and/or employing a bristle surface that presents a greater length of continuous disruption to the flow of water.

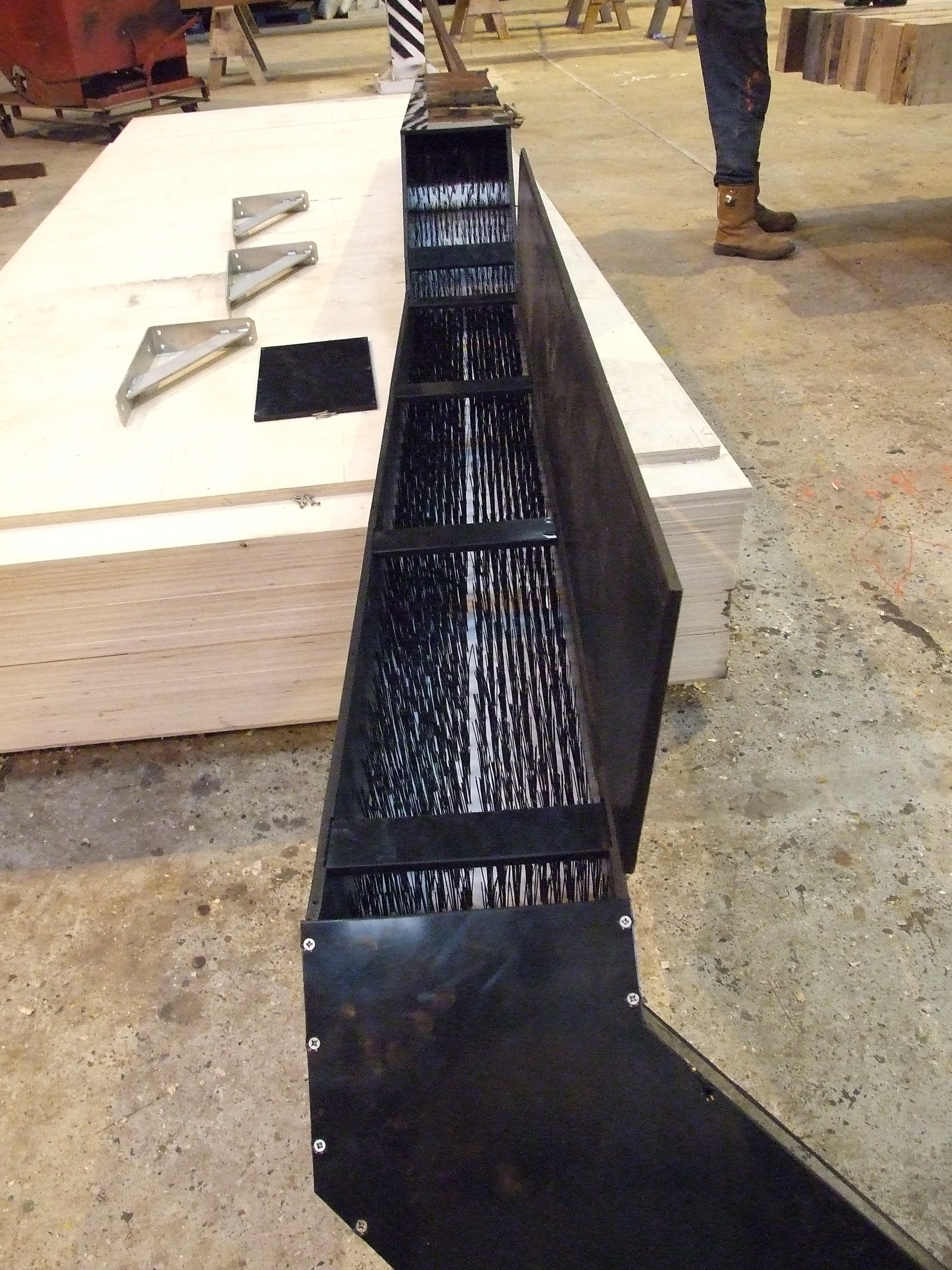
Elver pass during manufacture exposing bristles

== Migration and measurement ==
Eel and elver passes have a dual purpose. By separating the eel traffic in the flow of water more accurate measurement of eel and elver migration is made possible. The results also prove the benefits. Wisbech Standard 12 July 2014 report large numbers of eels return to the Fens also being able to migrate into the Middle Level along a bristle and duct type eel and elver pass.

== Regulations ==
The Eels (England and Wales) Regulations 2009 implement Council Regulation (EC) No 1100/2007 of the Council of the European Union, establishing measures for the recovery of the stock of European eel.

Some requirements of the regulations are, where appropriate, to:

- Notify the Environment Agency of the construction, alteration or maintenance of any structure likely to affect the passage of eels.
- Construct and operate an eel pass to allow the free passage of eels
- Use eel screens to exclude eels from water abstraction and discharge points
- Use of a by-wash to return excluded eels to the waters they came from.

== See also ==
- Fish ladder
