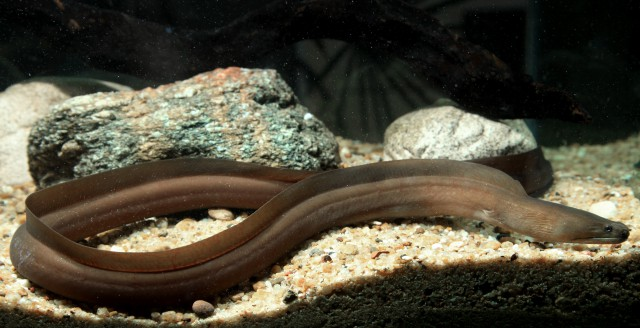

Conservation status
- Least Concern (IUCN 3.1)

Scientific classification
- Kingdom: Animalia
- Phylum: Chordata
- Class: Actinopterygii
- Division: Teleostei
- Order: Anguilliformes
- Family: Muraenidae
- Genus: Strophidon
- Species: S. sathete

Binomial name
- Strophidon sathete (F. Hamilton, 1822)

Synonyms
- Thyrsoidea macrura (Bleeker, 1854); Evenchelys macrurus (Jordan & Evermann, 1902)

= Slender giant moray =

Giant slender bodied moray

Species of fish

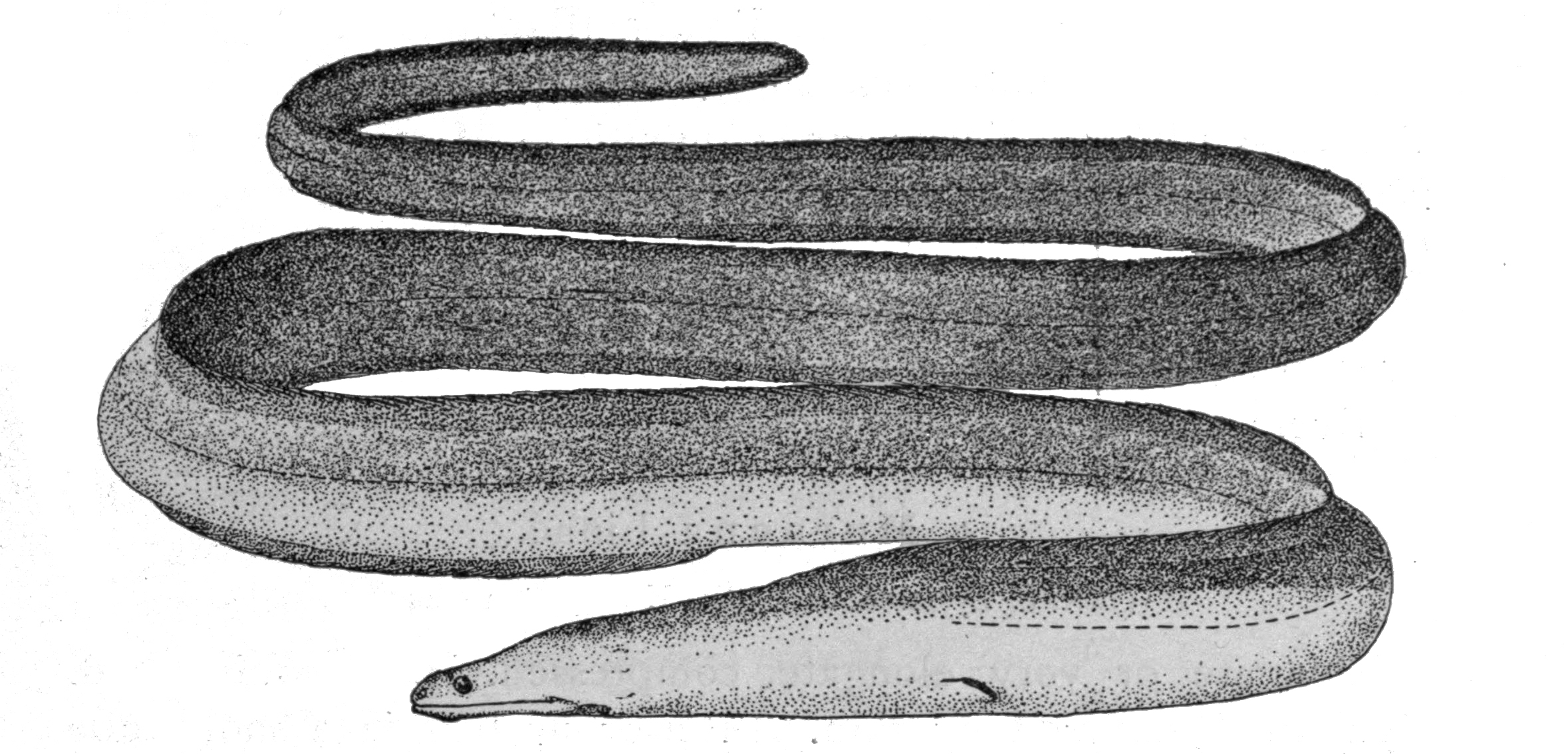
Slender giant moray depiction from 1911

Strophidon sathete, the slender giant moray, giant estuarine moray, or Gangetic moray, is the longest member of the family of moray eels. It is in the genus Strophidon. The longest recorded specimen was caught in 1927, on the Maroochy River in Queensland; it measured 3.94 metres (12 feet 11 inches) This species is characterized by an elongated body, as well as brownish-grey dorsal coloration which pales towards the venter.

== Distribution and habitat ==
The slender giant moray is found in the Indo-West Pacific Ocean from the Red Sea and East Africa to the western Pacific. It generally lives in the benthic muddy environments of marine and estuarine areas, including inner bays and rivers.

== Notes ==
- Böhlke, Eugenia B. (1997), "Notes on the Identity of Elongate Unpatterned Indo-Pacific Morays, with Description of a New Species (Muraenidae, Subfamily Muraninae)", Proceedings of the Academy of Natural Sciences of Philadelphia, vol. 147, pp. 89–109
- Böhlke, Eugenia B. (1995), "Notes on the Muraenid Genera Strophidon, Lycodontis, Siderea, Thyrsoidea, and Pseudechidna, with a Redescription of Muraena thyrsoidea Richardson, 1845", Proceedings of the Academy of Natural Sciences of Philadelphia, vol. 146, pp. 459–466
- Marshall, T. C. (1927), "Ichthyological Notes No. 2", Memoirs of the Queensland Museum, vol. 9, 1, pp. 107–108
