= Parechelus =

Parechelus Temporal range: Ypresian

Scientific classification
- Kingdom: Animalia
- Phylum: Chordata
- Class: Actinopterygii
- Division: Teleostei
- Order: Anguilliformes
- Family: †Parechelidae; Casier, 1967
- Genus: †Parechelus; Casier, 1967

Type species
- †Parechelus prangei Casier, 1967

Extinct genus of fishes

Parechelus is an extinct genus of prehistoric bony fish that lived during the Ypresian (lower Eocene). The genus was circumscribed by Edgard Casier in 1967 for his description of P. parechelus.

When Casier circumscribed this genus, he simultaneously defined the family Parechelidae, with Parechelus as its sole genus; and placed it in the order Anguilliformes. The family Parechelidae was considered to be intermediate between Ophichthidae and Muraenidae. Jack Sepkoski, citing Colin Patterson, also classified the genus in Anguilliformes.

== See also ==
- Prehistoric fish
- List of prehistoric bony fish
