= Mastygocercus =

Mastygocercus Temporal range: Miocene

Scientific classification
- Kingdom: Animalia
- Phylum: Chordata
- Class: Actinopterygii
- Division: Teleostei
- Order: Anguilliformes
- Genus: †Mastygocercus; Beaufort, 1925
- Species: †M. vermiformis

Binomial name
- †Mastygocercus vermiformis Beaufort, 1925

Extinct genus of fishes

Mastygocercus is an extinct genus of eel that lived in South Sulawesi during the Miocene epoch. It is known from a single specimen that preserved numerous vertebrae (around 100 in number) but lacking the head part. The fossil is said to be 165 mm in length. From what can be observed, Masytgocercus have a well developed dorsal and anal fin with distinct rays. These fin appeared to not extend until the very end of the tail hence Mastygocercus in life probably have a whiplike rear part. The whiplike portion is said to not much thicker that a coarse thread. Beaufort himself wrote that it remind him of Trichiurus genera albeit having different anterior vertebrae or eel from Nemichthyidae group.
