= Eomuraena =

Eomuraena Temporal range: Lower Eocene Possible Maastrichtian occurrence

Scientific classification
- Kingdom: Animalia
- Phylum: Chordata
- Class: Actinopterygii
- Division: Teleostei
- Order: Anguilliformes
- Family: Muraenidae
- Genus: †Eomuraena; Casier, 1967
- Species: †E. sagittidens

Binomial name
- †Eomuraena sagittidens Casier, 1967

Extinct genus of fishes

Eomuraena ("dawn Muraena") is an extinct genus of prehistoric marine moray eel that lived during the lower Eocene, with potential Late Cretaceous records also known. It contains a single species, E. sagittidens.

Definitive records of E. sagittidens are only known from fossil neurocrania in Early Eocene-aged sediments on the German island of Fehmarn. However, the teeth of a similar fish (referred to as Eomuraena cf. sagittidens) are known from marine-brackish sediments in the late Maastrichtian-aged Lameta Formation and freshwater sediments in the Early Paleocene-aged Intertrappean Beds of India.

== See also ==
- Prehistoric fish
- List of prehistoric bony fish
