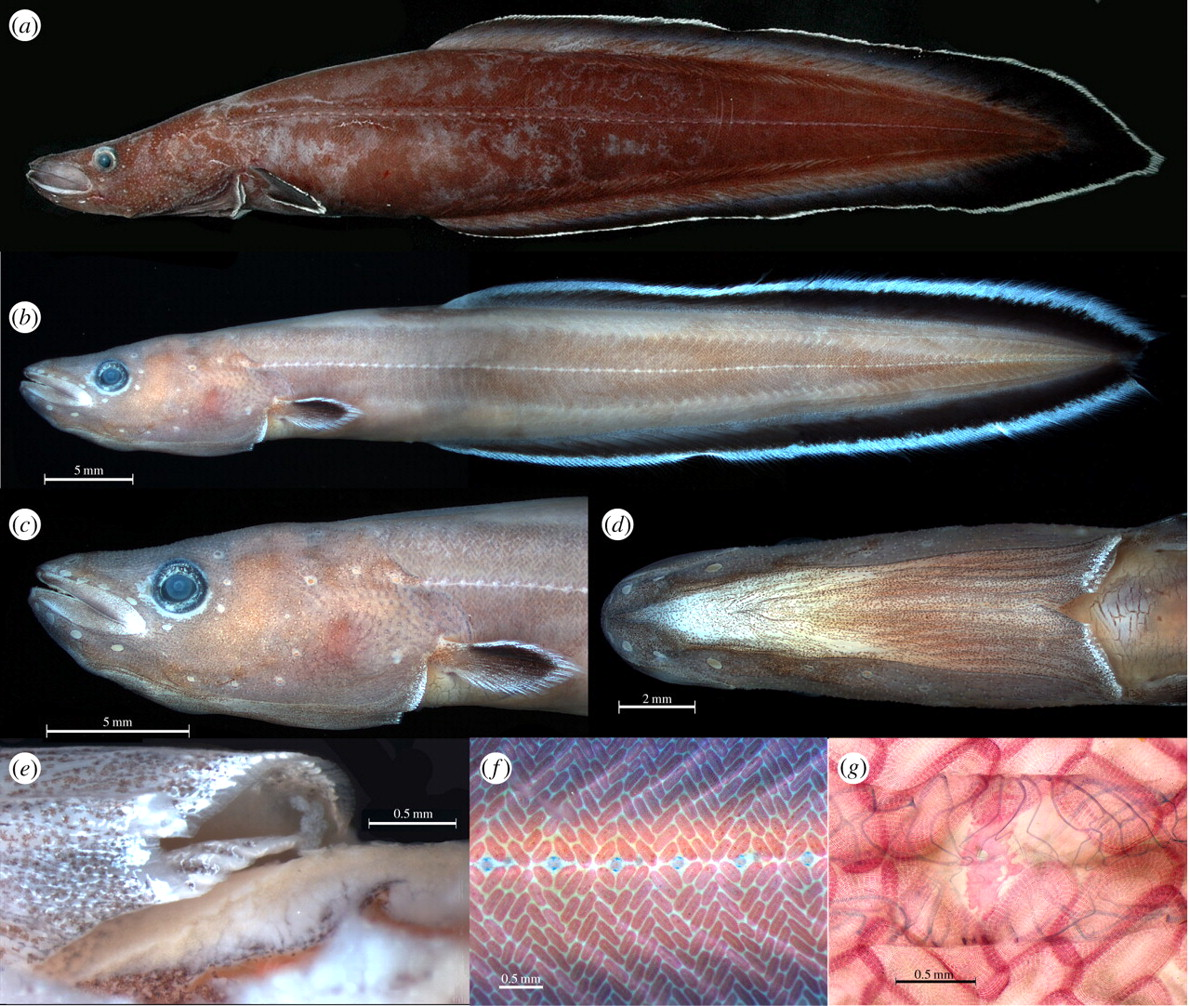
- (a) Holotype, female. (b–g) Paratype, juvenile, 65 mm (2.6 in) SL; (c,d) head in lateral and ventral view; (e) gill opening; (f,g) stained body scales.

Conservation status
- Data Deficient (IUCN 3.1)

Scientific classification
- Kingdom: Animalia
- Phylum: Chordata
- Class: Actinopterygii
- Order: Anguilliformes
- Suborder: Synaphobranchoidei
- Family: Protanguillidae; G.D. Johnson, H. Ida & Miya, 2012
- Genus: Protanguilla; G.D. Johnson, H. Ida & Miya, 2012
- Species: P. palau

Binomial name
- Protanguilla palau G. D. Johnson, H. Ida & Sakaue, 2012

= Protanguilla =

Genus of fishes

Protanguilla palau is a species of eel, the only species in the genus Protanguilla (first eel), which is in turn the only genus in its family, Protanguillidae. Its common name is Palauan primitive cave eel. Individuals were found swimming in March 2010 in a deep underwater cave in a fringing reef off the coast of Palau.

Protanguillidae is considered a "living fossil", being the sister group to all other eels. They are synapomorphic with all other eel species, which were confirmed to be monophyletic through molecular analysis.

== Characteristics ==
The eel's body is very small and slender, being 176 mm (6.9 in) SL for the holotype female. The eel has a second premaxilla and under 90 vertebrae, features previously found only in fossilised eels. Its full set of gill rakers in its branchial arches has never been found in true eels, but is a common trait of other bony fish families.

It is very different from all other living eels, and scientists estimate it must have diverged from the others around 200 million years ago, during the Mesozoic era. It thus has not only its own species, but also its own genus and family as well, and has been referred to by scientists as a "living fossil".
