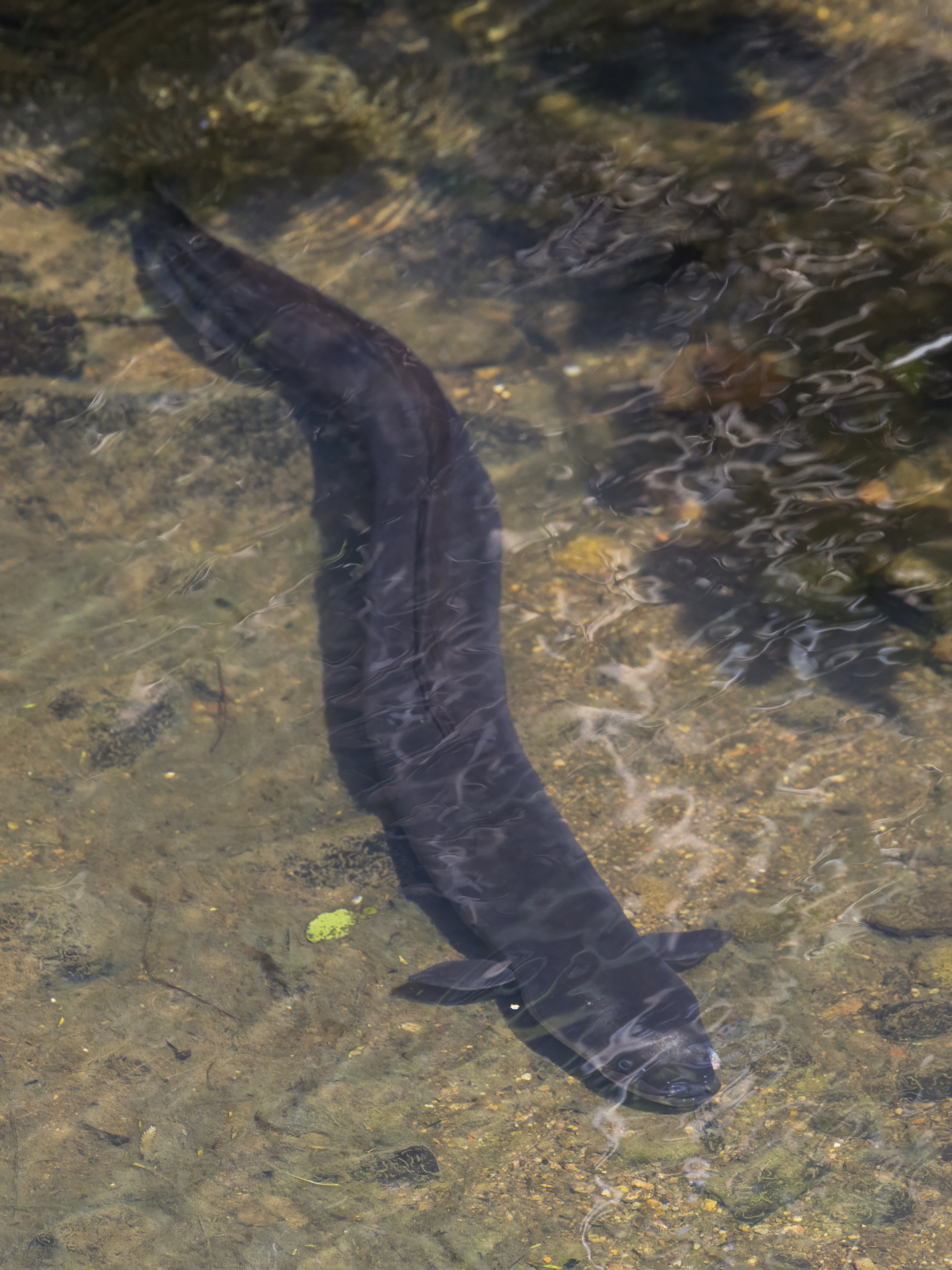
- Anguilla dieffenbachii, New Zealand

Scientific classification
- Kingdom: Animalia
- Phylum: Chordata
- Class: Actinopterygii
- Division: Teleostei
- Superorder: Elopomorpha
- Order: Anguilliformes; E. S. Goodrich, 1909

Type genus
- Anguilla Garsault, 1764

Suborders
- see text

= Eel =

Eel Temporal range: Cenomanian–recent

Order of fishes

Eels are ray-finned fish belonging to the order Anguilliformes (/æŋˈɡwɪlɪfɔːrmiːz/), which consists of eight suborders, 20 families, 164 genera, and about 1000 species. Eels undergo considerable development from the early larval stage to the eventual adult stage and are usually predators.

The term "eel" is also used for some other eel-shaped fish, such as electric eels (genus Electrophorus), swamp eels (order Synbranchiformes), slime eels (class Myxini), and deep-sea spiny eels (family Notacanthidae). However, these other clades, with the exception of deep-sea spiny eels, whose order Notacanthiformes is the sister clade to true eels, evolved their eel-like shapes independently from the true eels. As a general rule, most eels are marine. Exceptions are the catadromous genus Anguilla and the freshwater moray, which spend most of their life in freshwater, the anadromous rice-paddy eel, which spawns in freshwater, and the freshwater snake eel Stictorhinus.

== Description ==
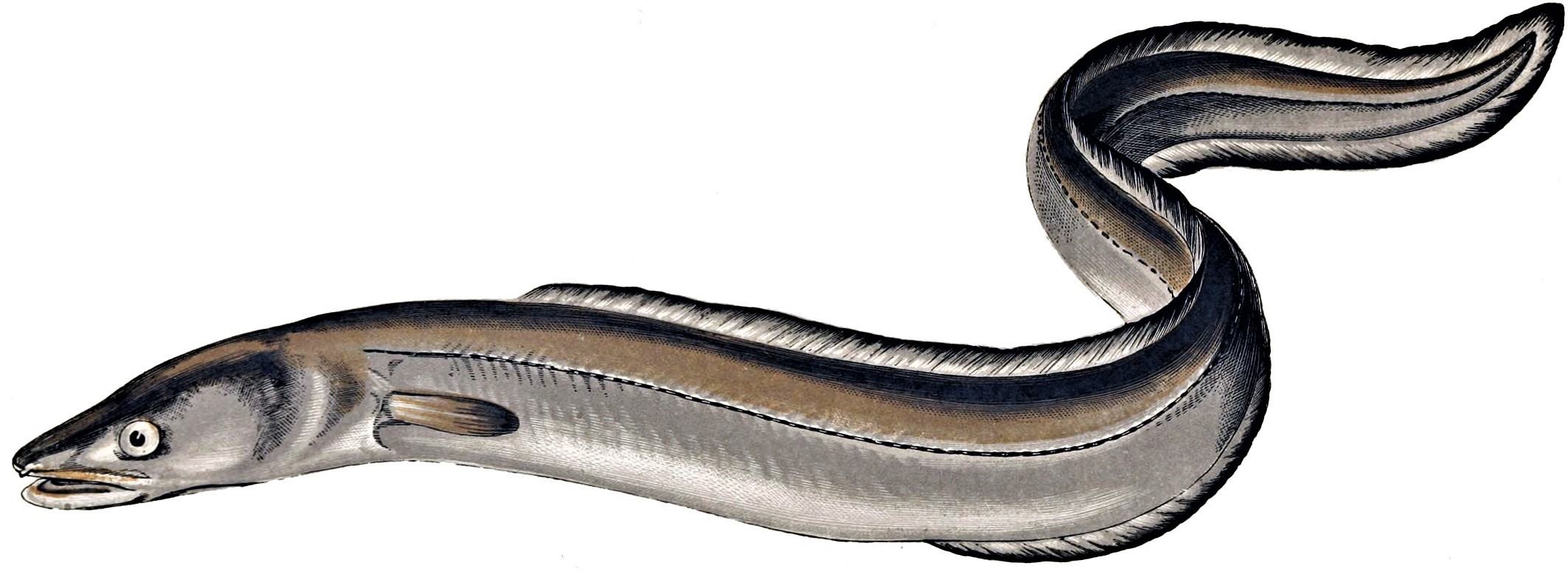
The European conger is the heaviest of all eels.

Spotted moray eel in a tank, 2016

Eels are elongated fish, ranging in length from 5 cm (2 in) in the one-jawed eel (Monognathus ahlstromi) to 4 m (13 ft) in the slender giant moray. Adults range in weight from 30 g (1 oz) to well over 25 kg (55 lb). They possess no pelvic fins, and many species also lack pectoral fins. The dorsal and anal fins are fused with the caudal fin, forming a single ribbon running along much of the length of the animal. Eels swim by generating propulsive waves that travel the length of their bodies. They can swim backward by reversing the direction of the wave.

The heaviest true eel is the European conger. The maximum size of this species has been reported as reaching a length of 3 m (10 ft) and a weight of 110 kg (240 lb). Other eels are longer, but do not weigh as much, such as the slender giant moray, which reaches 4 m (13 ft). Most species of eels are nocturnal; they inhabit shallow waters of the ocean and burrow into sand, mud, or amongst rocks. Sometimes, they are seen living together in holes or "eel pits". Some eels also live in deeper water on the continental shelves and over the slopes deep as 4,000 m (13,000 ft). Only members of the Anguilla regularly inhabit fresh water, but they, too, return to the sea to breed.

== Life cycle ==
Eels begin life as flat and transparent larvae, called leptocephali. Eel larvae drift in the sea's surface waters, feeding on marine snow, small particles that float in the water. Eel larvae then metamorphose into glass eels and become elvers before finally seeking out their juvenile and adult habitats. Some individuals of anguillid elvers remain in brackish and marine areas close to coastlines, but most of them enter freshwater where they travel upstream and are forced to climb up obstructions, such as weirs, dam walls, and natural waterfalls.

Lifecycle of a typical (catadromous) eel

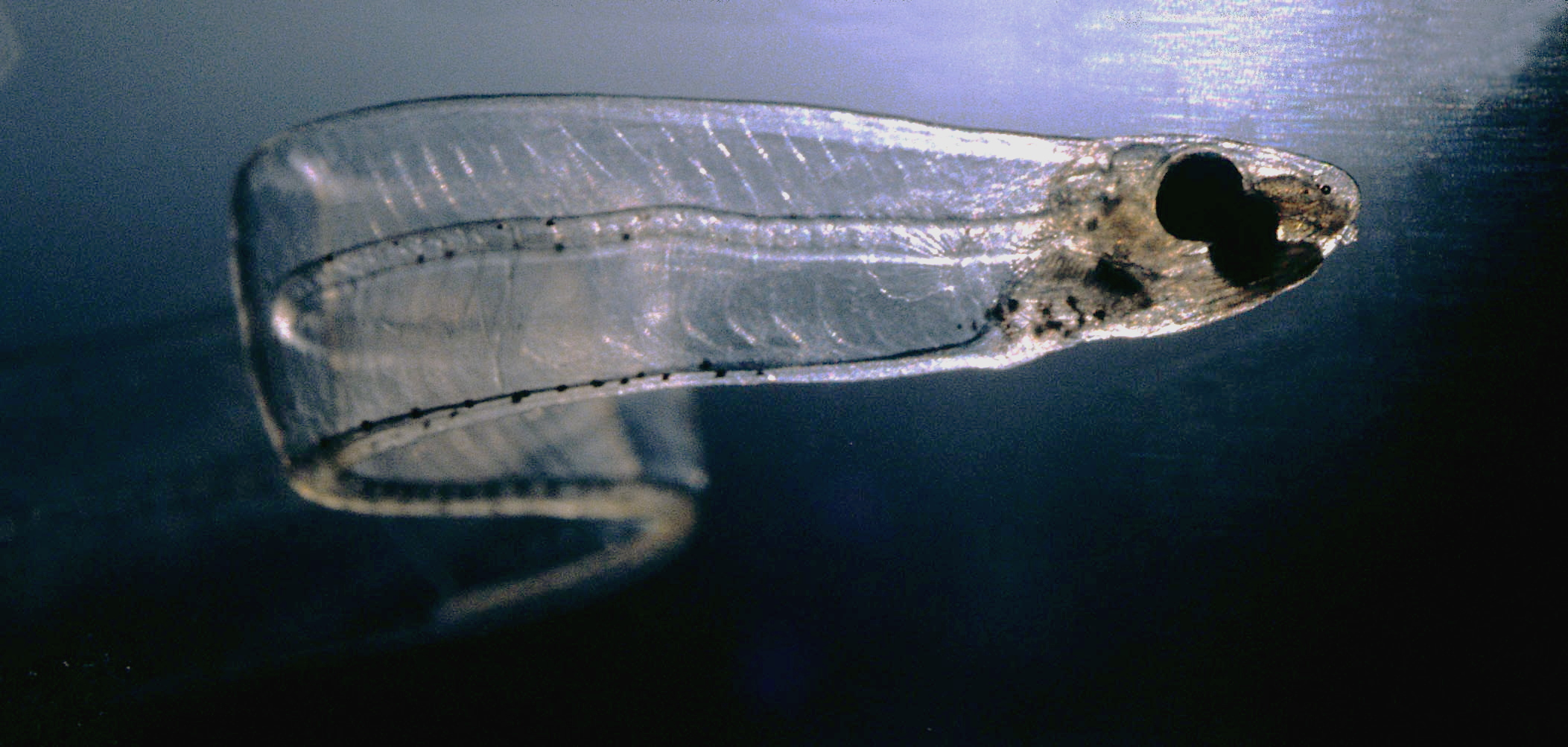
Eel eggs hatch firstly into the leptocephalus larval stage.

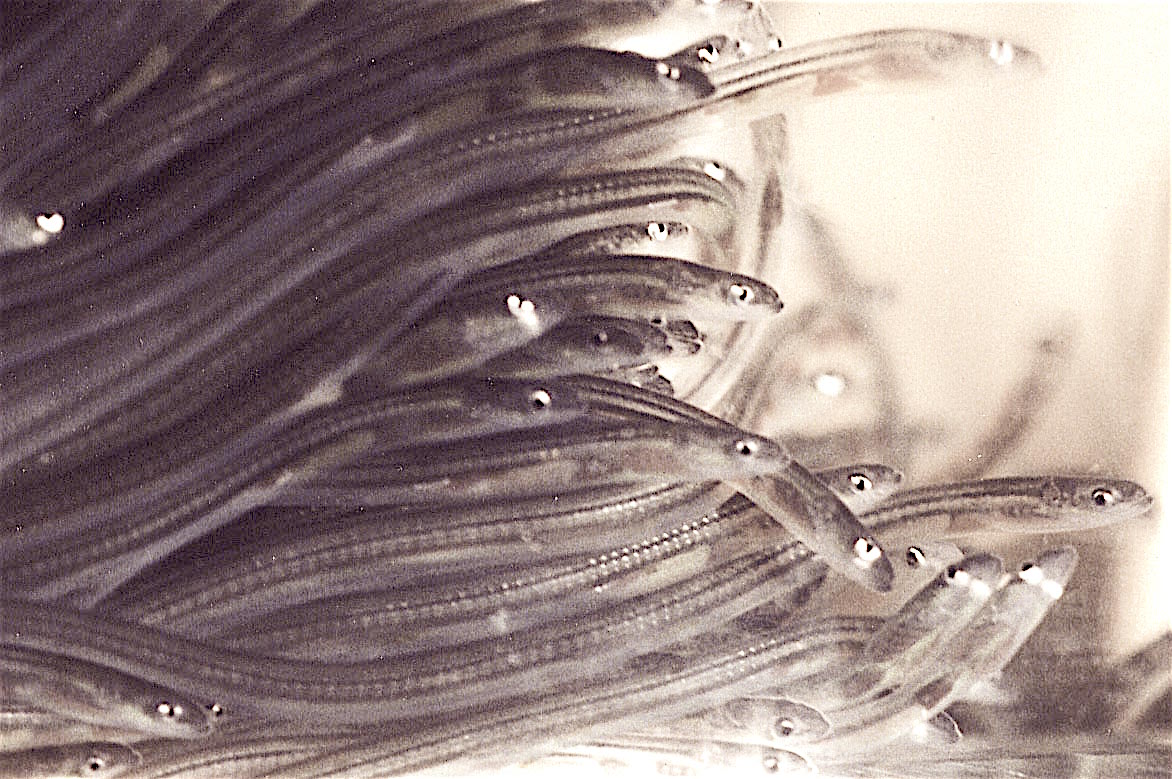
Larval eels become glass eels as they transition from the ocean to fresh water.

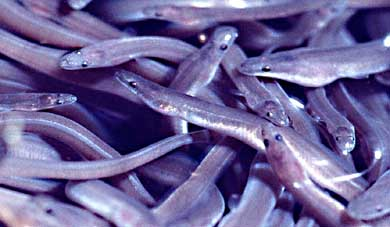
As freshwater elvers, eels work their way upstream.

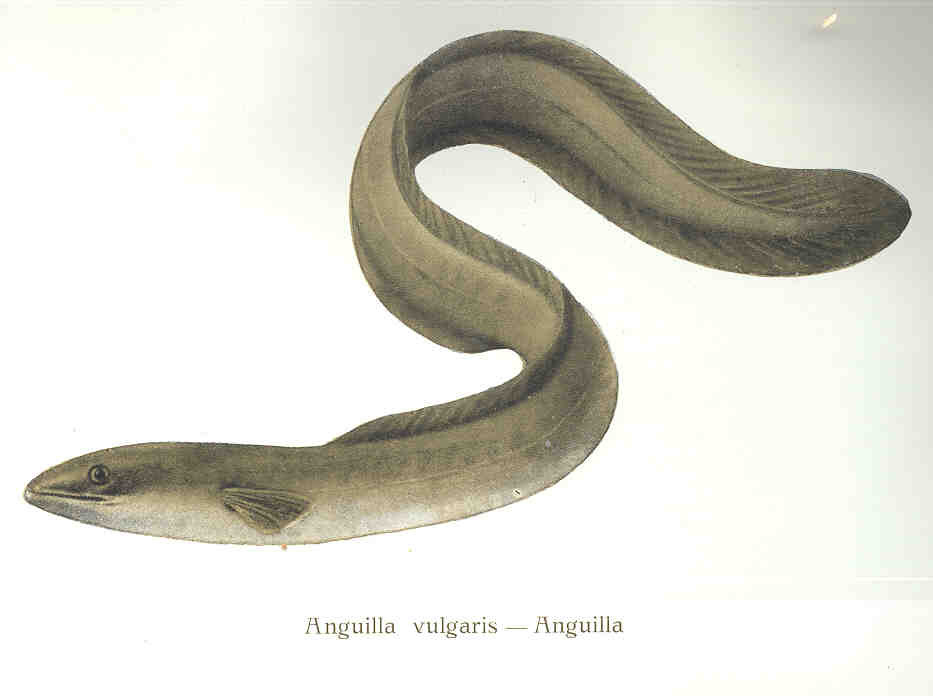
Mature silver stage eels migrate back to the ocean to mate.

Gertrude Elizabeth Blood found that the eel fisheries at Ballisodare were greatly improved by the hanging of loosely plaited grass ladders over barriers, enabling elvers to ascend more easily.

== Classification ==
Several sets of classifications of eels exist; some, such as FishBase which divide eels into 20 families, whereas other classification systems such as ITIS and Systema Naturae 2000 include additional eel families, which are noted below.

Genomic studies indicate that there is a monophyletic group that originated among the deep-sea eels.

== Taxonomy ==
The earliest fossil eels are known from the Late Cretaceous (Cenomanian) of Lebanon. These early eels retain primitive traits such as pelvic fins and thus do not appear to be closely related to any extant taxa. Body fossils of modern eels do not appear until the Eocene, although otoliths assignable to extant eel families and even some genera have been recovered from the Campanian and Maastrichtian, indicating some level of diversification among the extant groups prior to the Cretaceous-Paleogene extinction, which is also supported by phylogenetic divergence estimates. One of these otolith taxa, the mud-dwelling Pythonichthys arkansasensis, appears to have thrived in the aftermath of the K-Pg extinction, based on its abundance.

=== Extant taxa ===
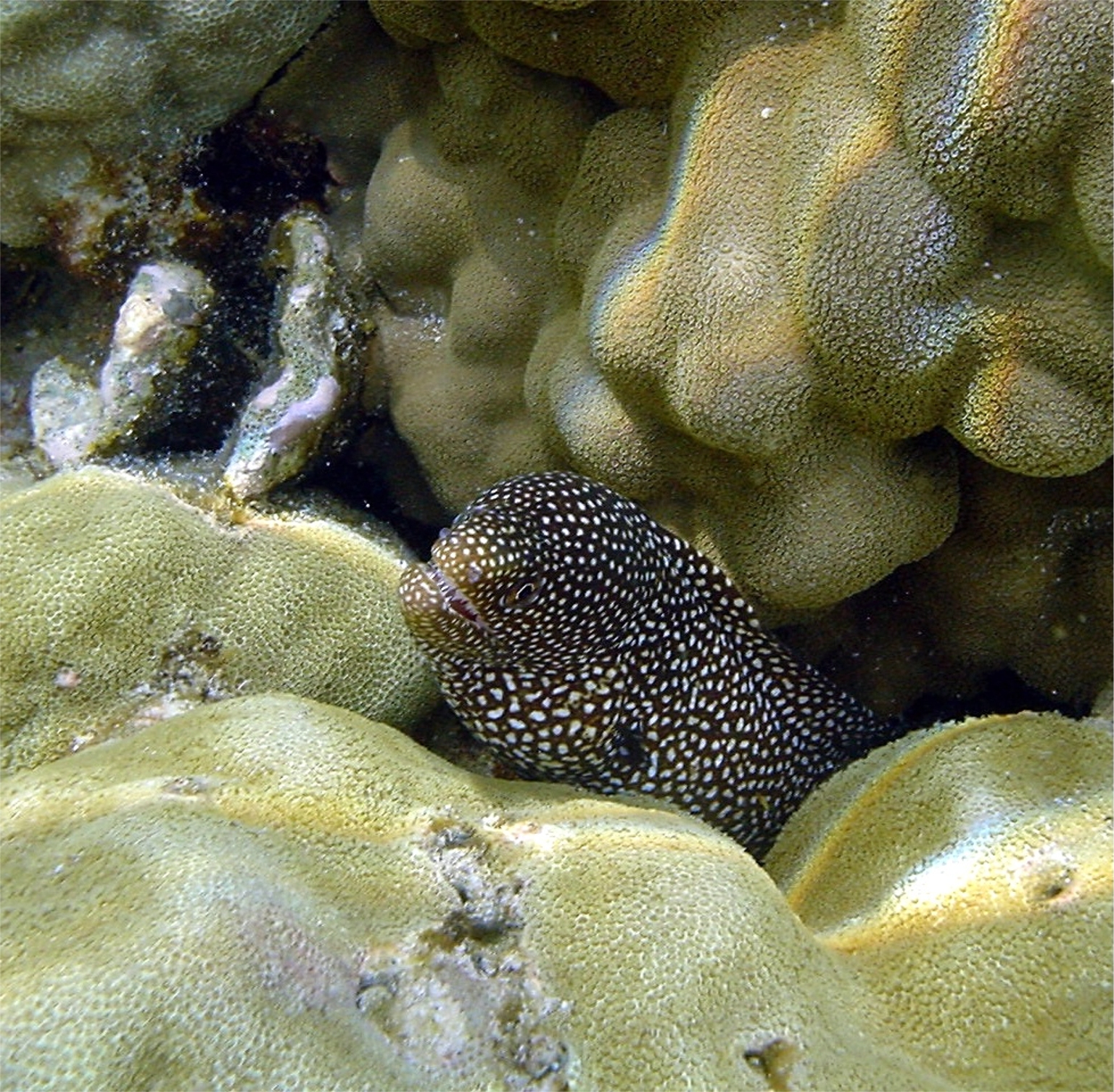
A moray eel

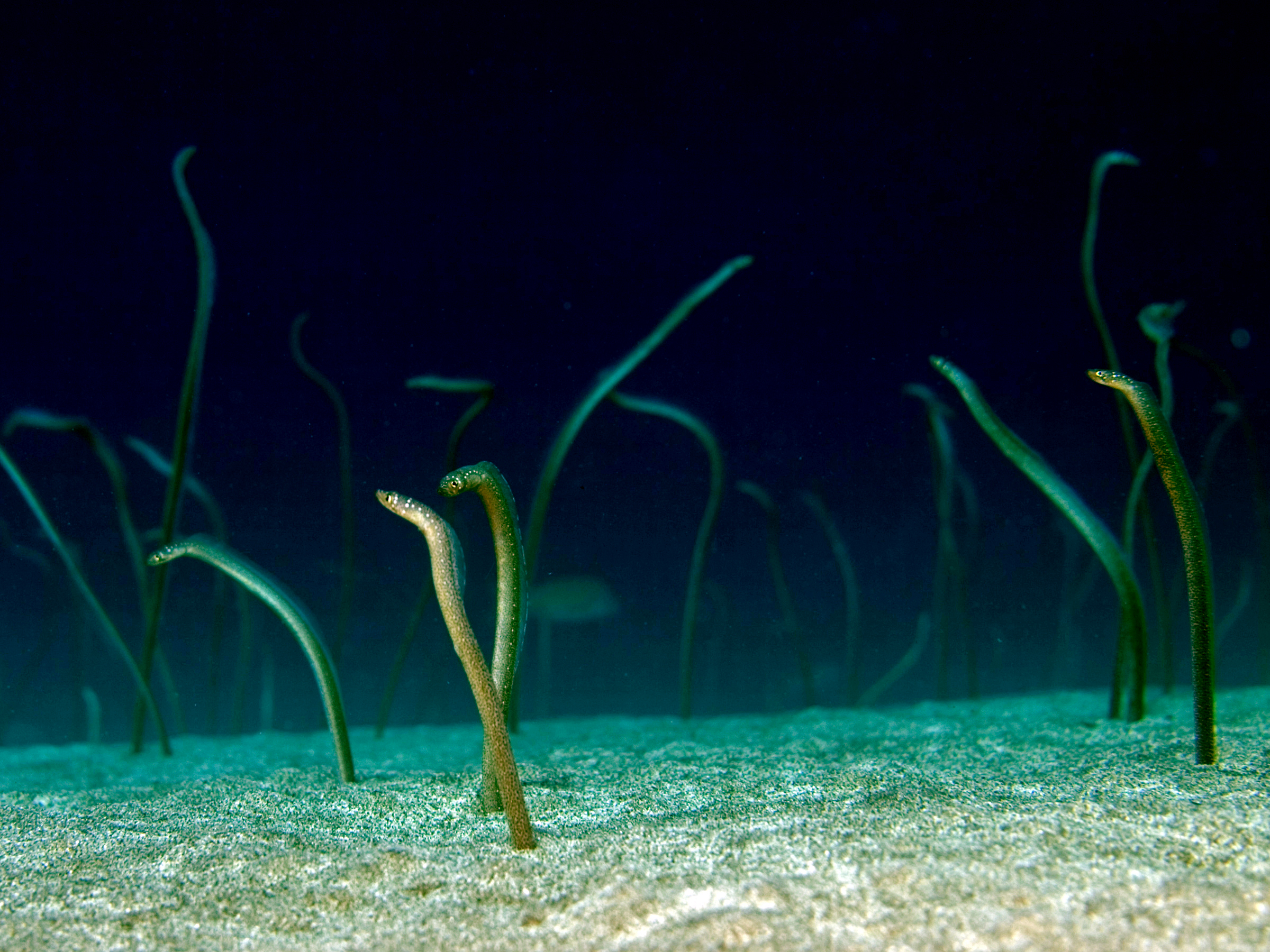
Gorgasia barnesi, a species of garden eel

Taxonomy based on Eschmeyer's Catalog of Fishes:

Order Anguilliformes

- Suborder Chlopsoidei
  - Family Chlopsidae Rafinesque, 1815 (false morays)
- Suborder Synaphobranchoidei
  - Family Protanguillidae G. D. Johnson, Ida & Miya, 2011 (primitive cave eels)
  - Family Synaphobranchidae J. Y. Johnson, 1862 (cutthroat eels)
    - Subfamily Simenchelyinae Gill, 1879 (pugnose parasitic eels)
    - Subfamily Ilyophinae D. S. Jordan & Davis, 1891 (arrowtooth eels or mustard eels)
    - Subfamily Synaphobranchinae J. Y. Johnson, 1862 (cutthroat eels)
- Suborder Anguilloidei
  - Family Moringuidae Gill, 1885 (spaghetti eels)
  - Family Anguillidae Rafinesque, 1810 (freshwater eels)
  - Family Nemichthyidae Kaup. 1859 (snipe eels or threadtail snipe eels)
  - Family Serrivomeridae Trewavas, 1932 (sawtooth eels)
  - Family Cyematidae Regan, 1912 (bobtail eels)
  - Family Monognathidae Trewavas, 1937 (onejaw gulpers)
  - Family Neocyematidae Poulsen, M. J. Miller, Sado, Hanel, Tsukamoto & Miya, 2018 (orange bobtail eels)
  - Family Eurypharyngidae Gill, 1883 (gulper eels or pelican eels)
  - Family Saccopharyngidae Bleeker, 1859 (swallower eels or whiptail gulpers)
- Suborder Muraenoidei
  - Family Heterenchelyidae Regan, 1912 (mud eels)
  - Family Myrocongridae Gill, 1890 (myroconger eels)
  - Family Muraenidae Rafinesque, 1815 (moray eels)
    - Subfamily Uropterygiinae Fowler, 1925 (tailfin moray eels)
    - Subfamily Muraeninae Rafinesque, 1815 (morays)
- Suborder Congroidei
  - Family Colocongridae Smith, 1976 (shorttail eels)
  - Family Derichthyidae Gill, 1884 (longneck eels or narrowneck eels)
  - Family Ophichthidae Günther, 1870 (snake eels and worm eels)
    - Subfamily Myrophinae Kaup, 1856 (worm eels)
    - Subfamily Ophichthinae Günther, 1870 (snake eels)
  - Family Muraenesocidae Kaup, 1859 (pike conger eels)
  - Family Nettastomatidae Kaup, 1859 (duckbill eels)
  - Family Congridae Kaup, 1856 (conger eels)
    - Subfamily Congrinae Kaup, 1856 (congers)
    - Subfamily Bathymyrinae Böhlke, 1949
    - Subfamily Heterocongrinae Günther, 1870 (garden eels)
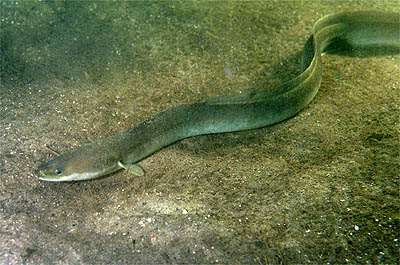
Anguilla anguilla (Anguillidae)

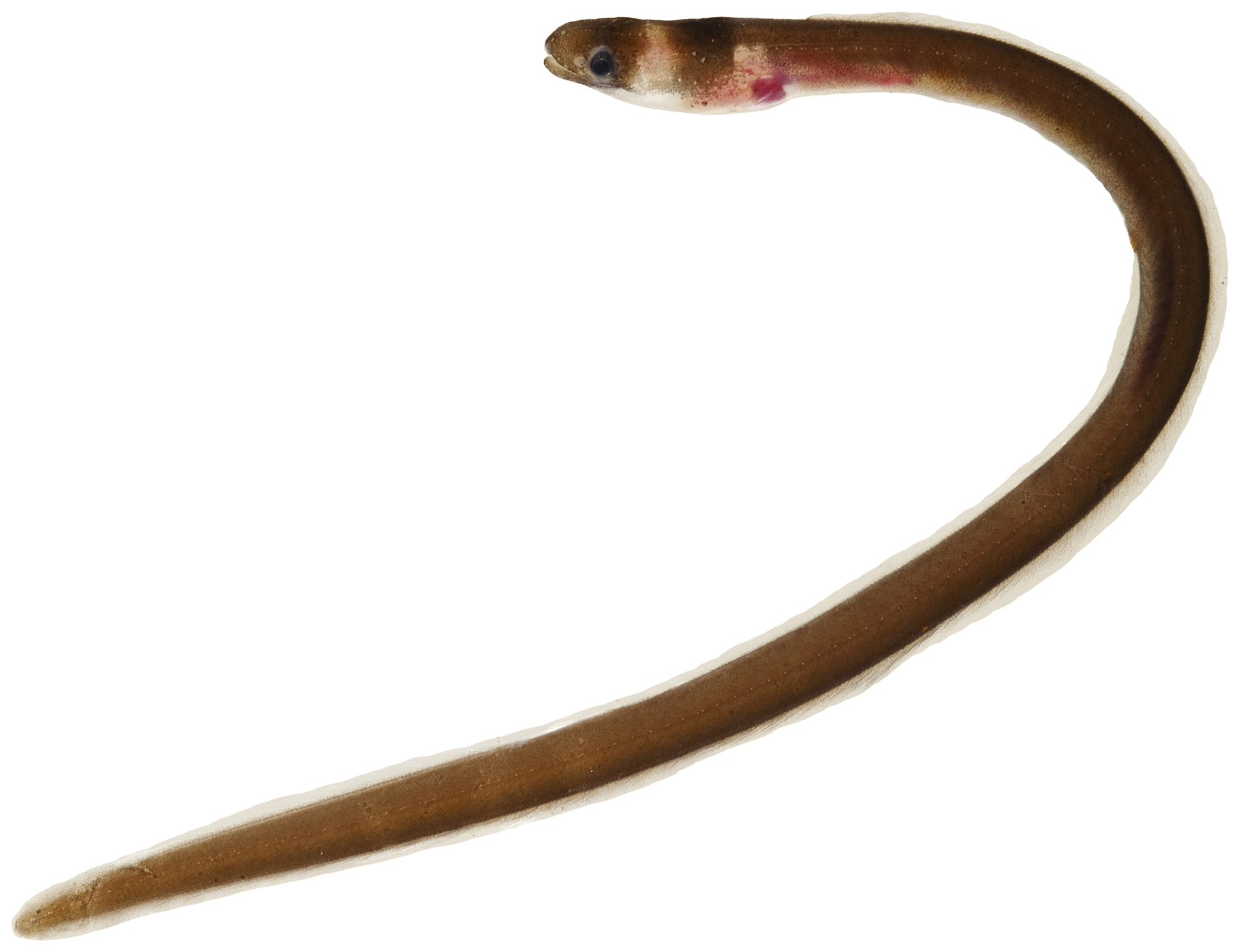
Kaupichthys nuchalis (Chlopsidae)

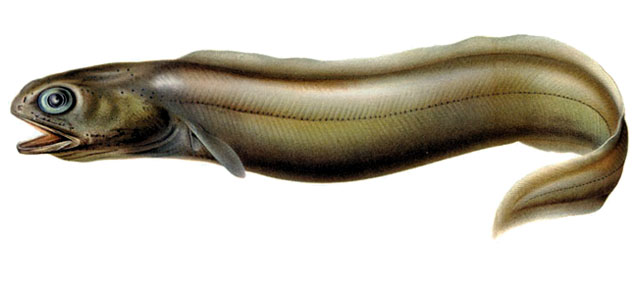
Coloconger raniceps (Colocongridae)

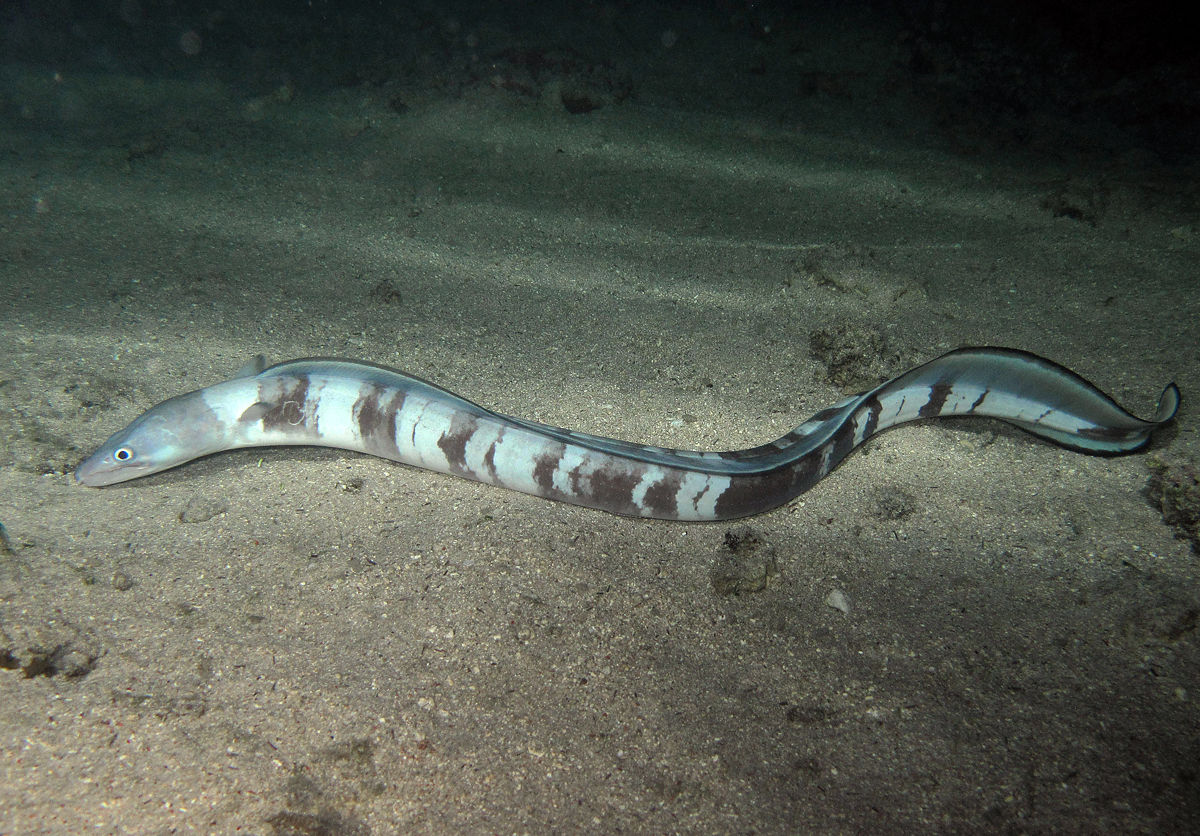
Conger cinereus (Congridae)

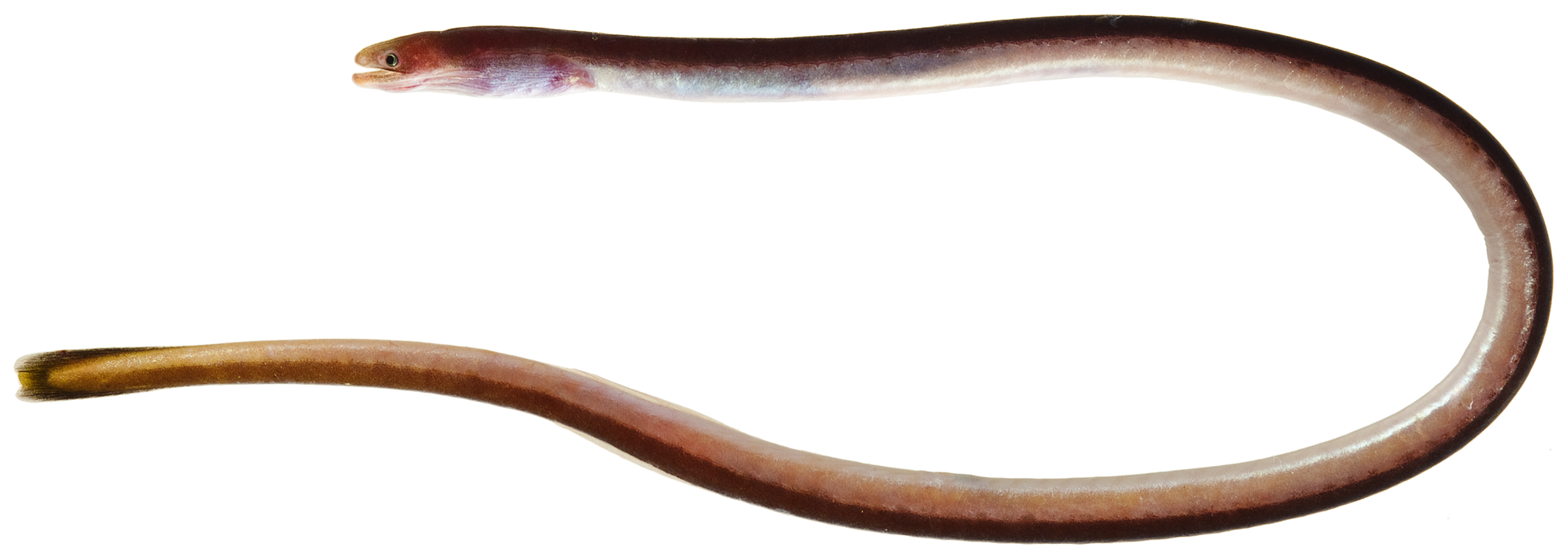
Moringua edwardsi (Moringuidae)

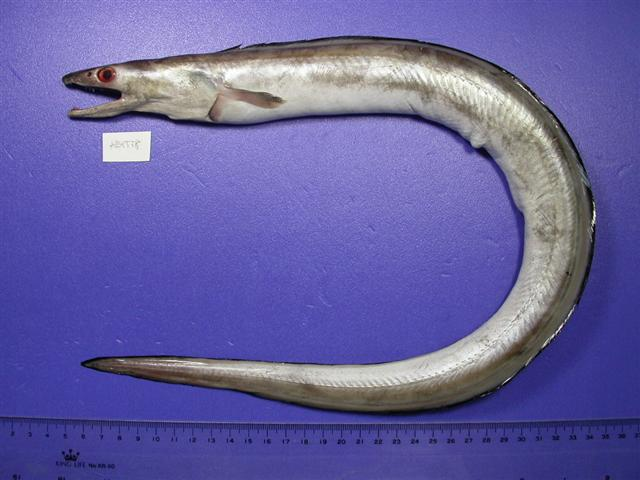
Muraenesox cinereus (Muraenesocidae)

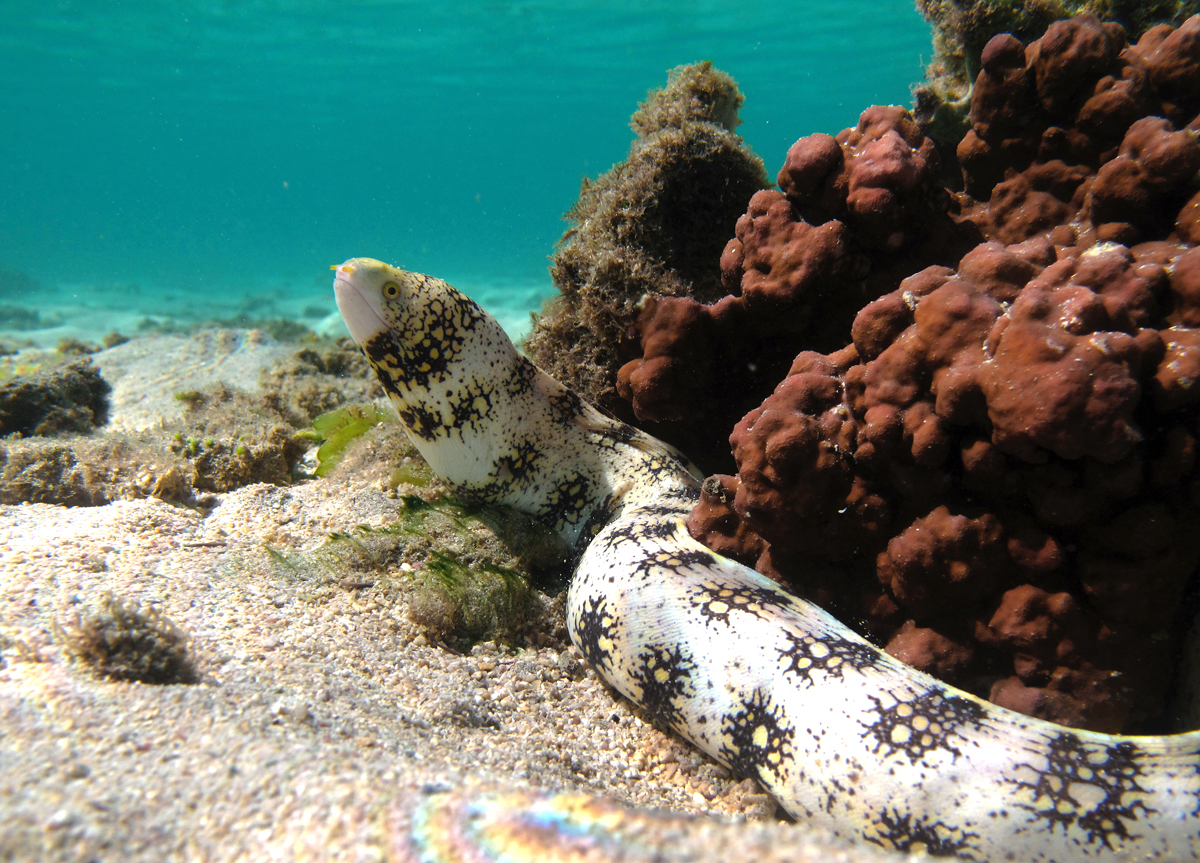
Echidna nebulosa (Muraenidae)

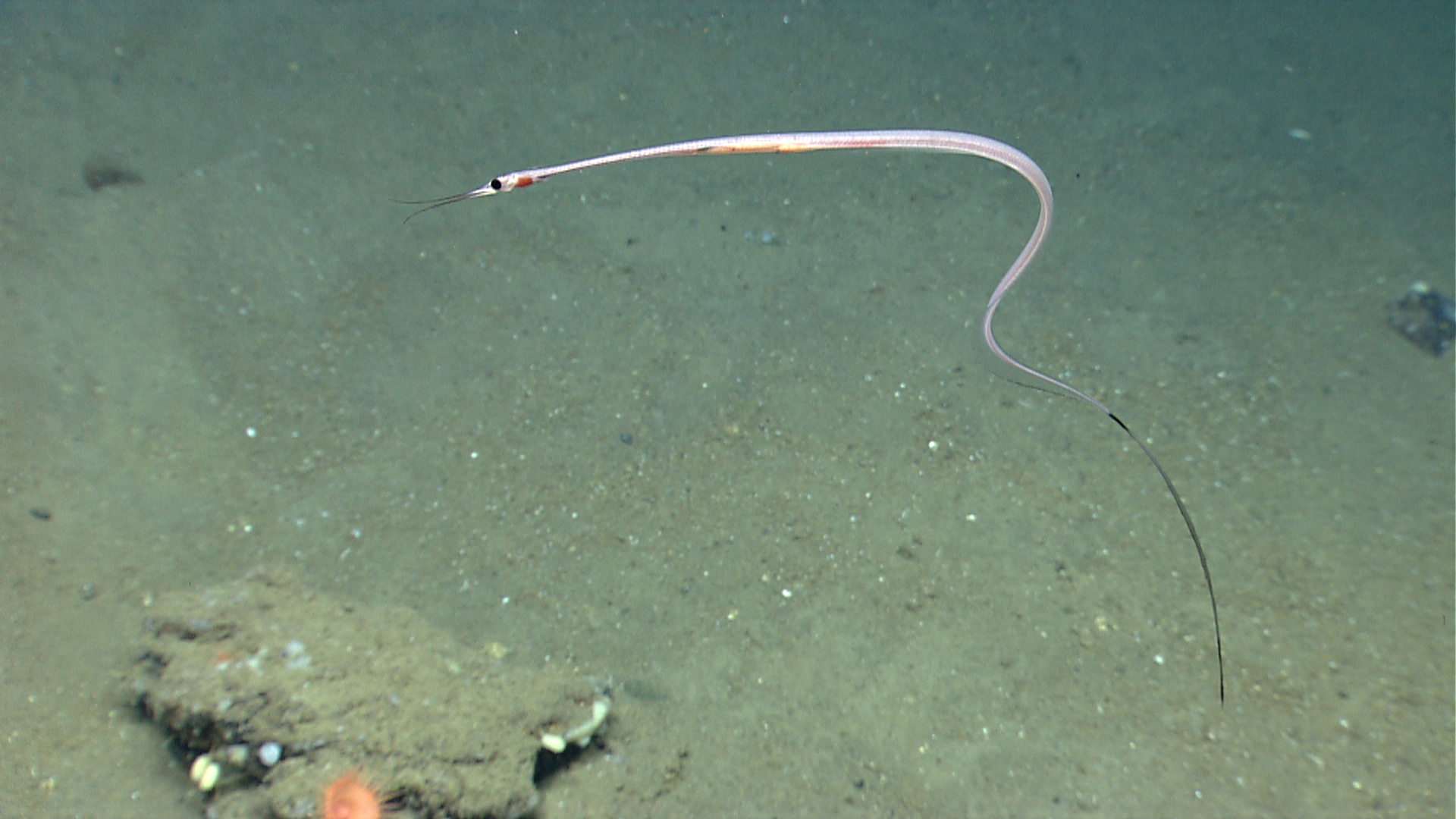
A Nemichthyidae

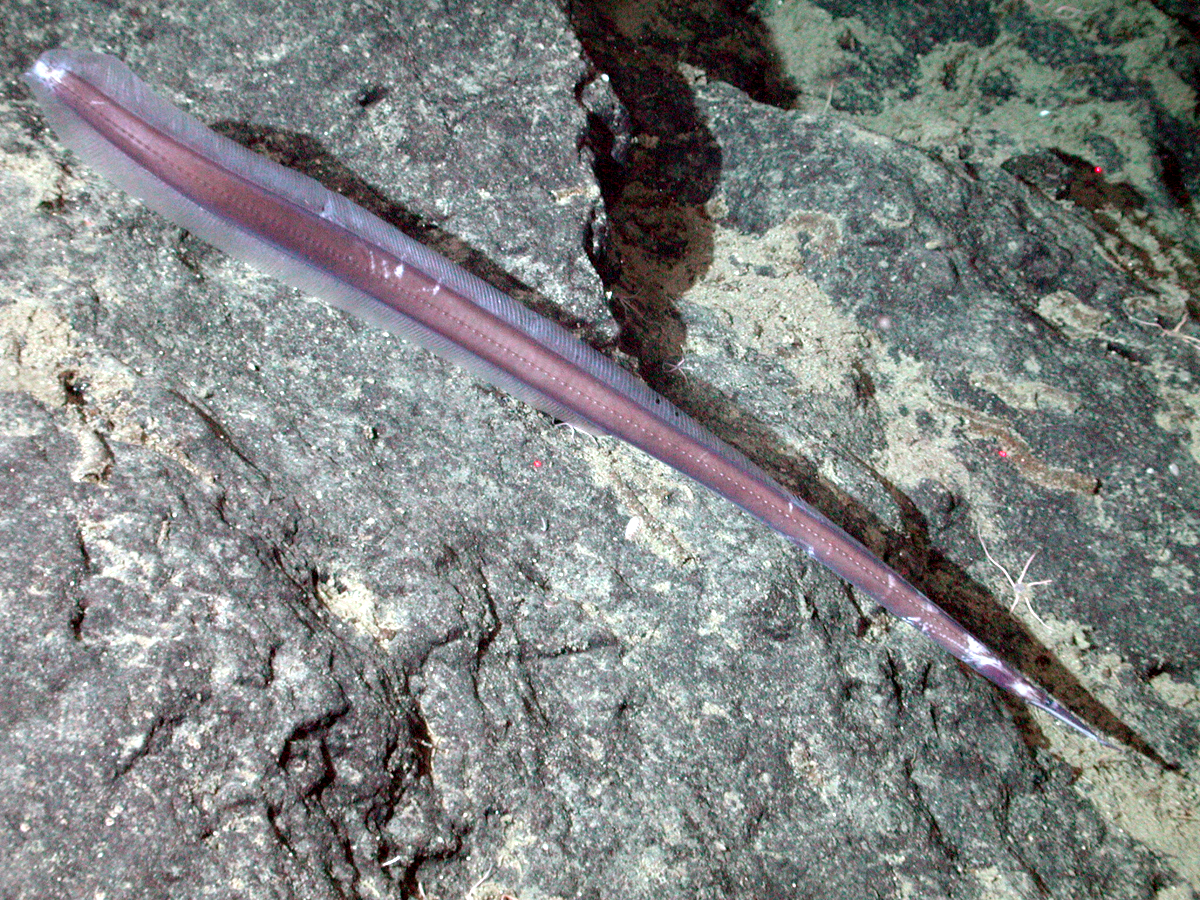
Venefica tentaculata (Nettastomatidae)

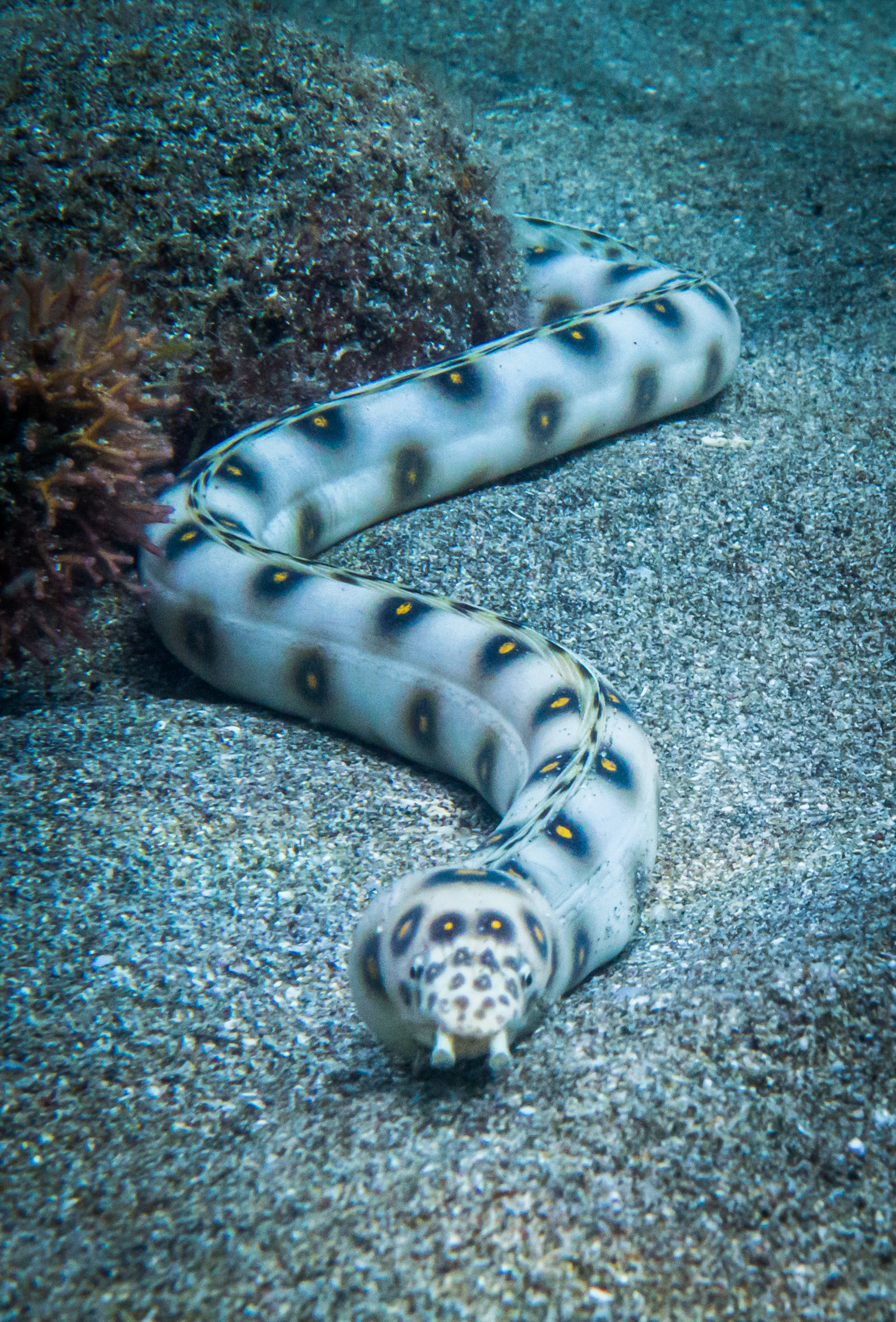
Myrichthys ocellatus (Ophichthidae)

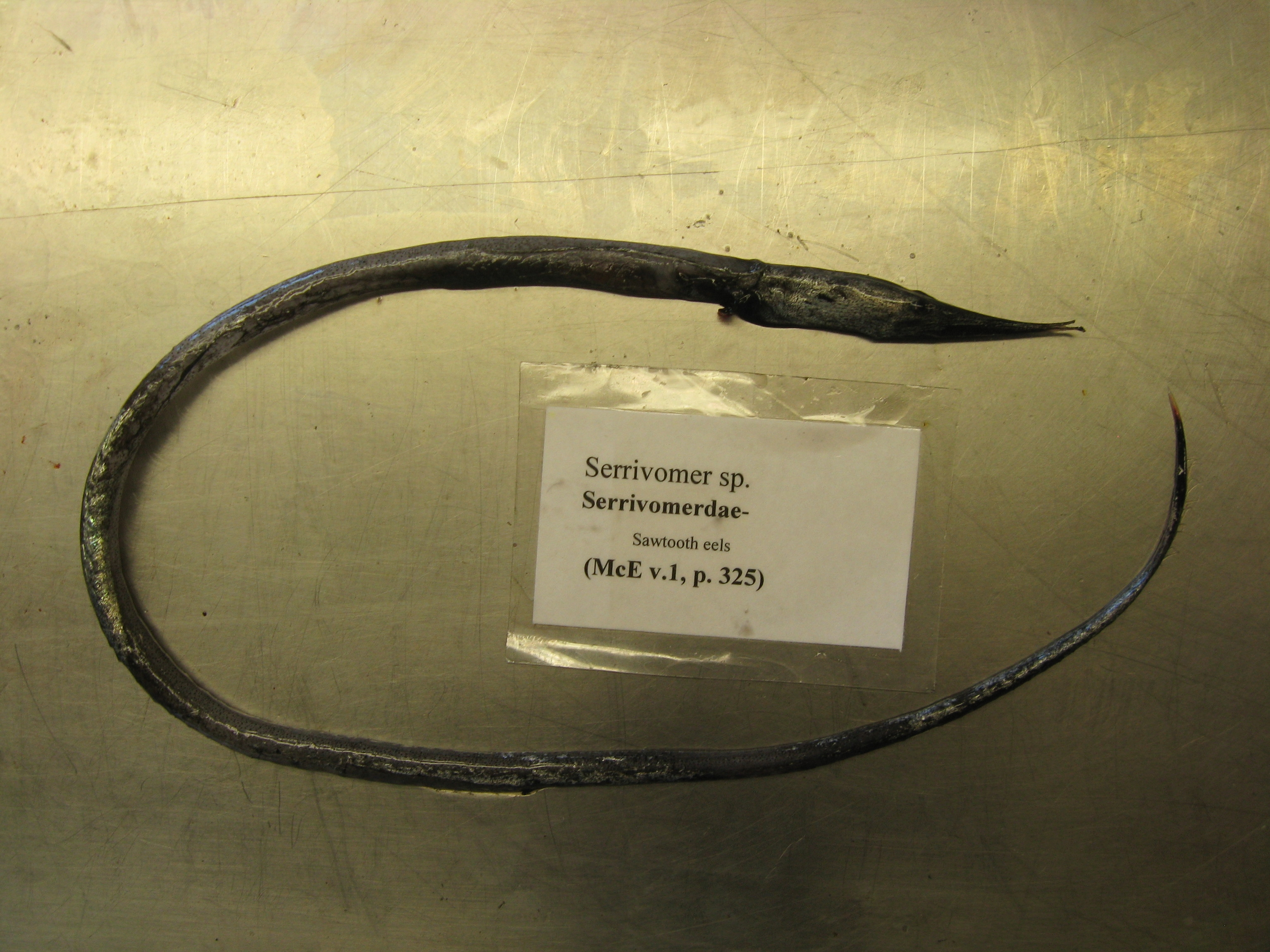
Serrivomer sp. (Serrivomeridae)

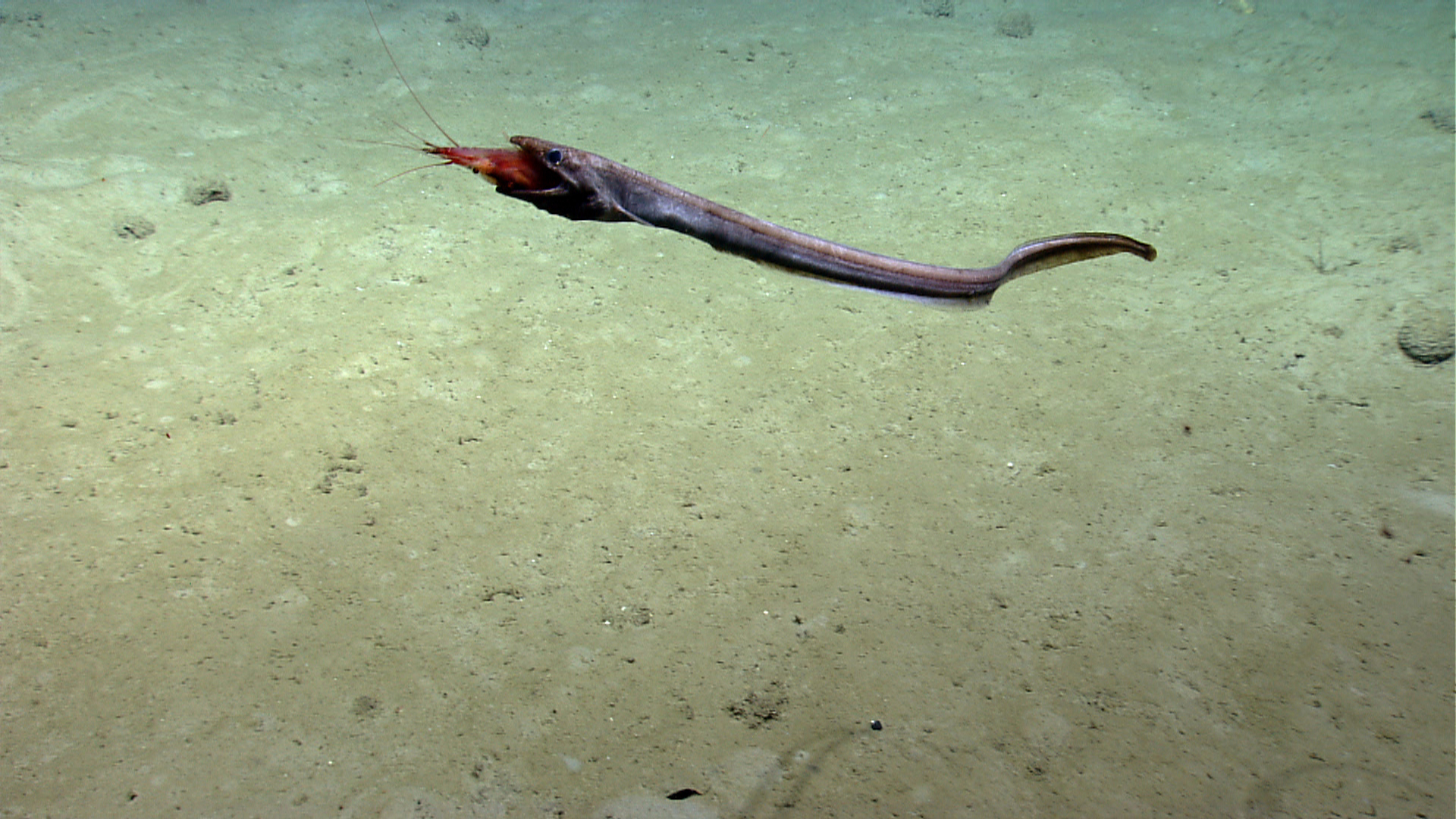
A synaphobranchid

In some classifications, the family Cyematidae of bobtail snipe eels is included in the Anguilliformes, but in the FishBase system that family is included in the order Saccopharyngiformes.

The electric eel of South America is not a true eel but is a South American knifefish more closely related to the carps and catfishes.

=== Phylogeny ===
Phylogeny based on Johnson et al. 2012.

- Anguilliformes
  - Protanguilloidei
    Protanguillidae
  - - Synaphobranchoidei
      Synaphobranchidae
    - - Muraenoidei
        - Heterenchelyidae
        - - Myrocongridae
          - Muraenidae
      - - Chlopsoidei
          Chlopsidae
        - - Congroidei
            - Derichthyidae
            - - Nettastomatidae
              - - Congridae
                - - Ophichthidae
                  - Muraenesocidae
          - - Moringuoidei
              Moringuidae
            - - Saccopharyngoidei
                - - Eurypharyngidae
                  - Saccopharyngidae
                - - Monognathidae
                  - Cyematidae
              - Anguilloidei
                - Nemichthyidae
                - - Serrivomeridae
                  - Anguillidae

=== Extinct taxa ===
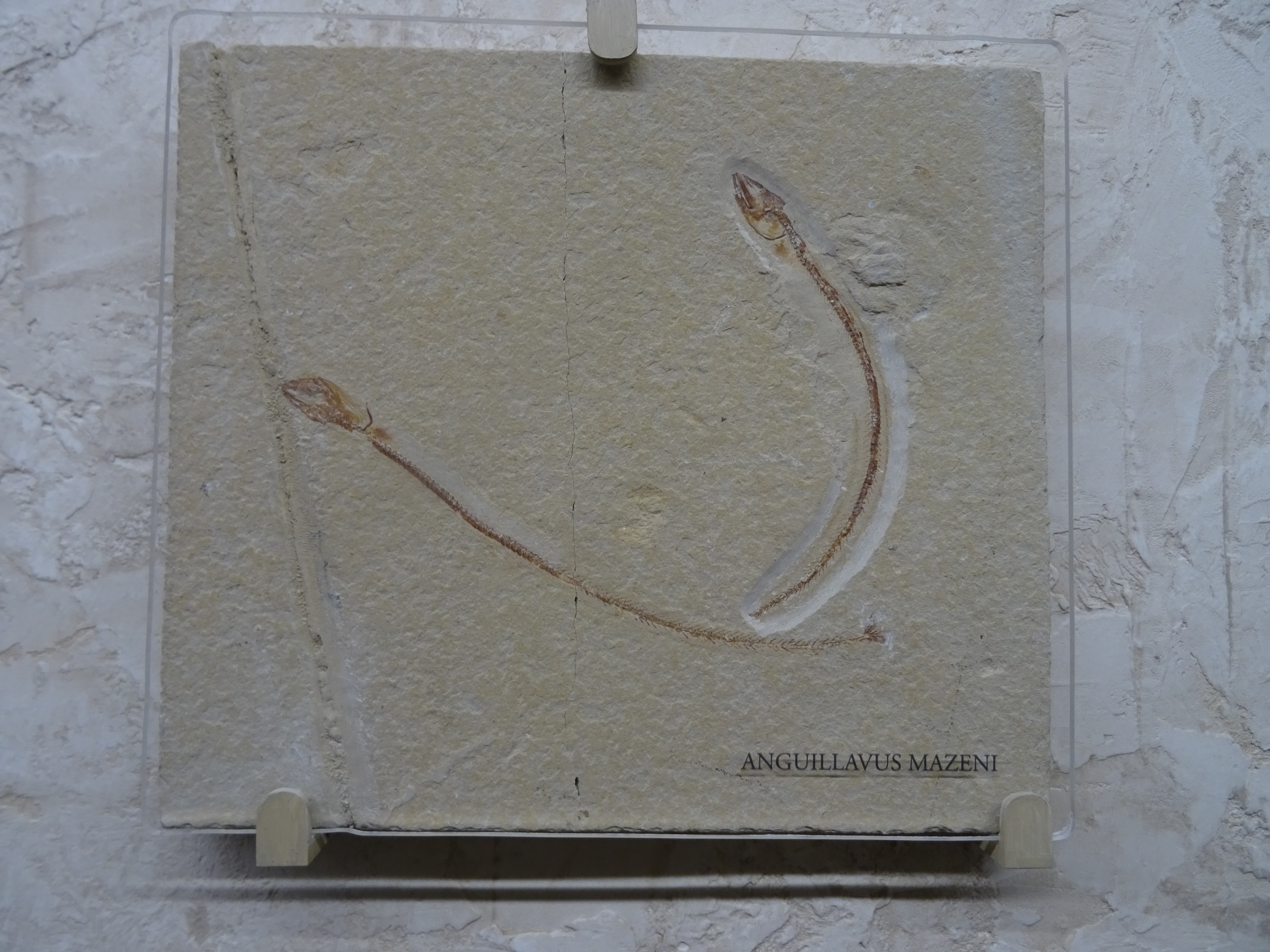
Anguillavus, one of the earliest known eels from the Sannine Limestone

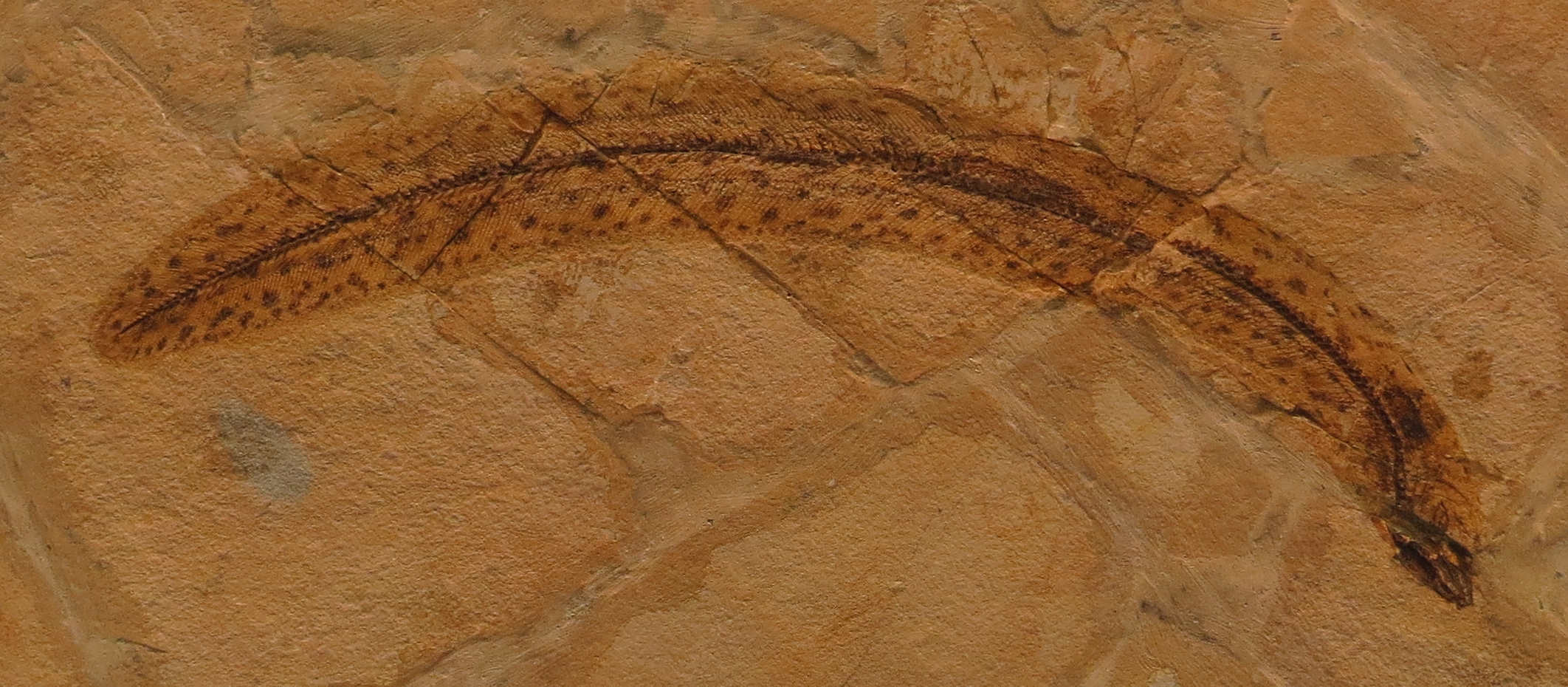
Paranguilla, an Eocene eel from Monte Bolca

Based on the Paleobiology Database:

- Genus †Abisaadia
- Genus †Bolcanguilla
- Genus †Eomuraena
- Genus †Eomyrophis
- Genus †Gazolapodus
- Genus †Hayenchelys
- Genus †Luenchelys
- Genus †Mastygocercus
- Genus †Micromyrus
- Genus †Mylomyrus
- Genus †Palaeomyrus
- Genus †Parechelus
- Genus †Proserrivomer
- Family †Anguillavidae
- Family †Anguilloididae
- Family †Libanechelyidae
- Family †Milananguillidae
- Family †Paranguillidae
- Family †Patavichthyidae
- Family †Proteomyridae
- Family †Urenchelyidae

== Commercial species ==
Main commercial species
Common name	Scientific name	Maximum length	Common length	Maximum weight	Maximum age	Trophic level	FishBase	FAO	ITIS	IUCN status
American eel	Anguilla rostrata (Lesueur, 1817)	152 cm	50 cm	7.33 kg	43 years	3.7				Endangered
European eel	Anguilla anguilla (Linnaeus, 1758)	150 cm	35 cm	6.6 kg	88 years	3.5				Critically endangered
Japanese eel	Anguilla japonica (Temminck & Schlegel, 1846)	150 cm	40 cm	1.89 kg		3.6				Endangered
Short-finned eel	Anguilla australis (Richardson, 1841)	130 cm	45 cm	7.48 kg	32 years	4.1				Near Threatened

== Use by humans ==
Freshwater eels (unagi) and marine eels (conger eel, anago) are commonly used in Japanese cuisine; foods such as unadon and unajū are popular, but expensive. Eels are also very popular in Chinese cuisine, and are prepared in many different ways. Hong Kong eel prices have often reached 1000 HKD (128.86 US Dollars) per kg, and once exceeded 5000 HKD per kg. In India, eels are popularly eaten in the Northeast. Freshwater eels, known as Kusia in Assamese, are eaten with curry, often with herbs. The European eel and other freshwater eels are mostly eaten in Europe and the United States, and is considered critically endangered. A traditional east London food is jellied eels, although the demand has significantly declined since World War II. The Spanish cuisine delicacy angulas consists of elver (young eels) sautéed in olive oil with garlic; elvers usually reach prices of up to 1000 euro per kg. New Zealand longfin eel is a traditional Māori food in New Zealand. In Italian cuisine, eels from the Valli di Comacchio, a swampy zone along the Adriatic coast, are especially prized, along with freshwater eels of Bolsena Lake and pond eels from Cabras, Sardinia. In northern Germany, the Netherlands, the Czech Republic, Poland, Denmark, and Sweden, smoked eel is considered a delicacy.

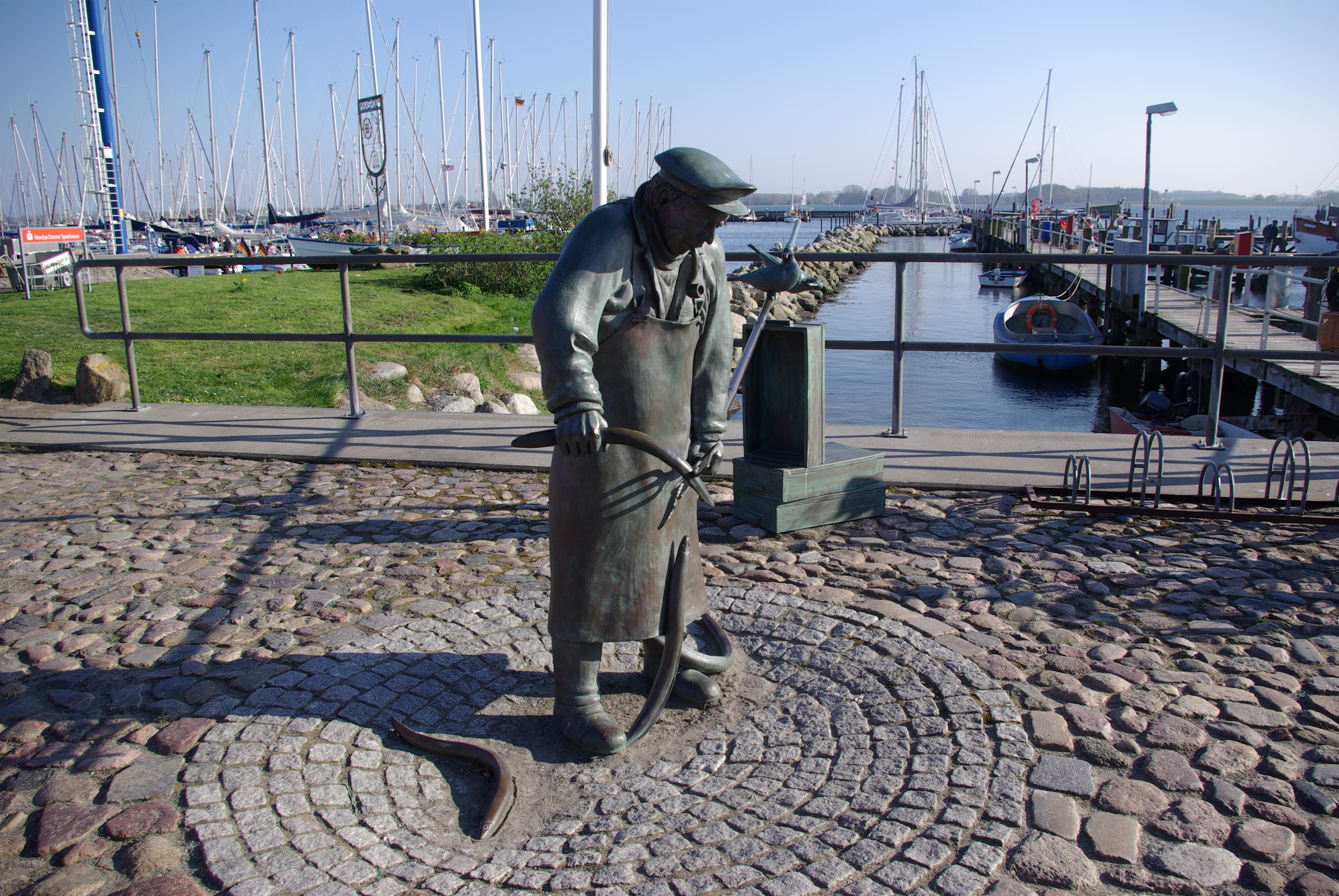
Eel picker in Maasholm, sculpture by Bernd Maro

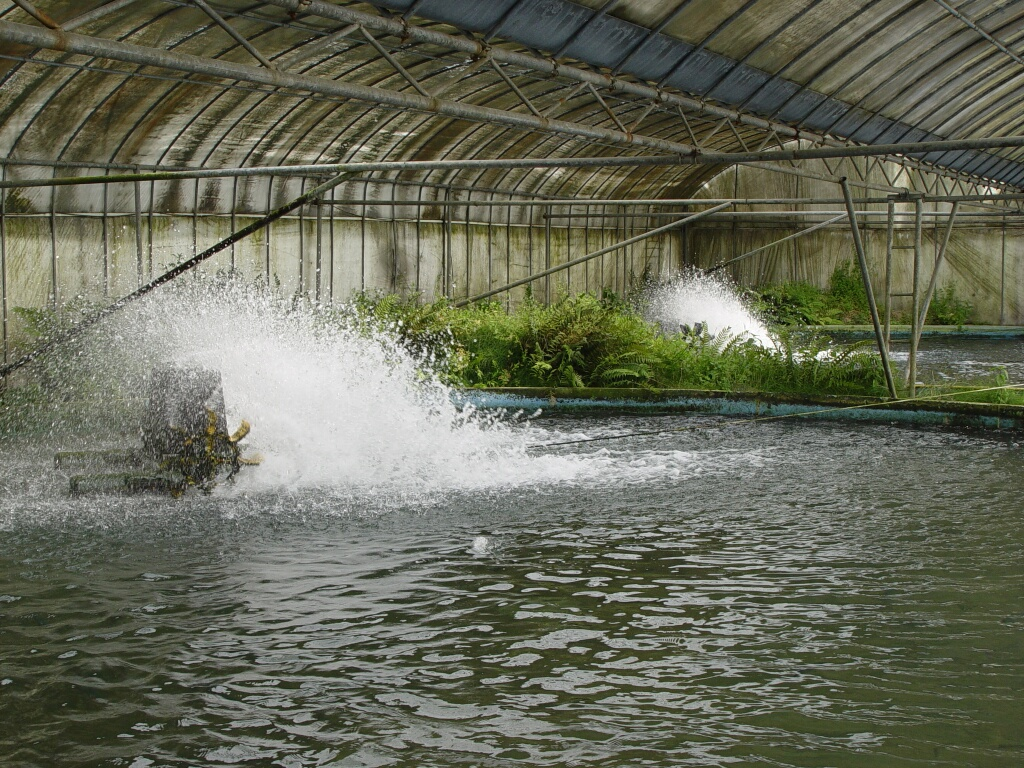
Green water culture system for Japanese eel

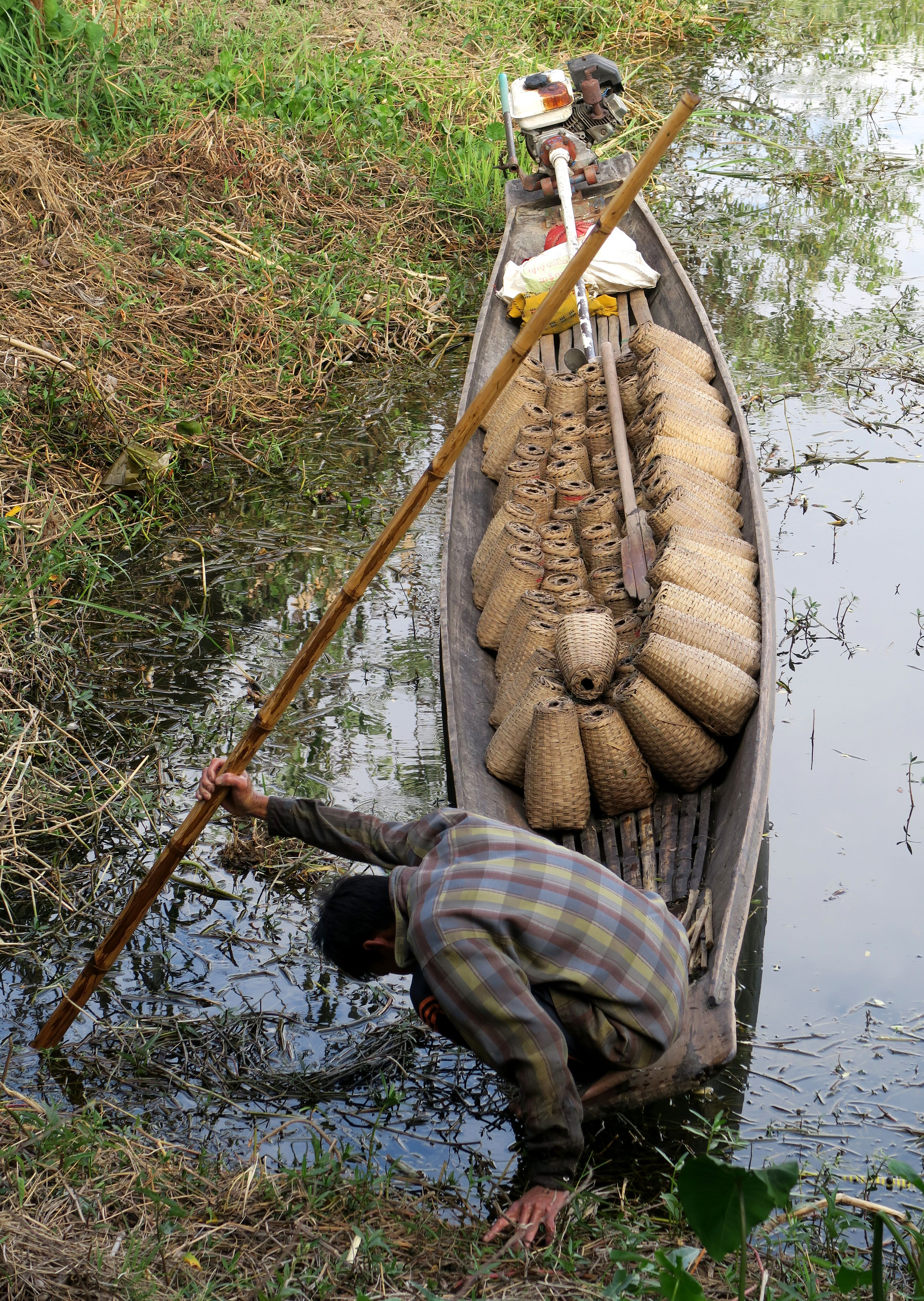
Positioning eel traps in Inle Lake (Myanmar)

Elvers, often fried, were once a cheap dish in the United Kingdom. During the 1990s, their numbers collapsed across Europe. They became a delicacy, and the UK's most expensive species.

Eels, particularly the moray eel, are popular among marine aquarists.

Eel blood is toxic to humans and other mammals, but both cooking and the digestive process destroy the toxic protein.

High consumption of eels is seen in European countries leading to those eel species being considered endangered.

== Sustainable consumption ==
In 2010, Greenpeace International added the European eel, Japanese eel, and American eel to its seafood red list. Japan consumes more than 70% of the global eel catch.

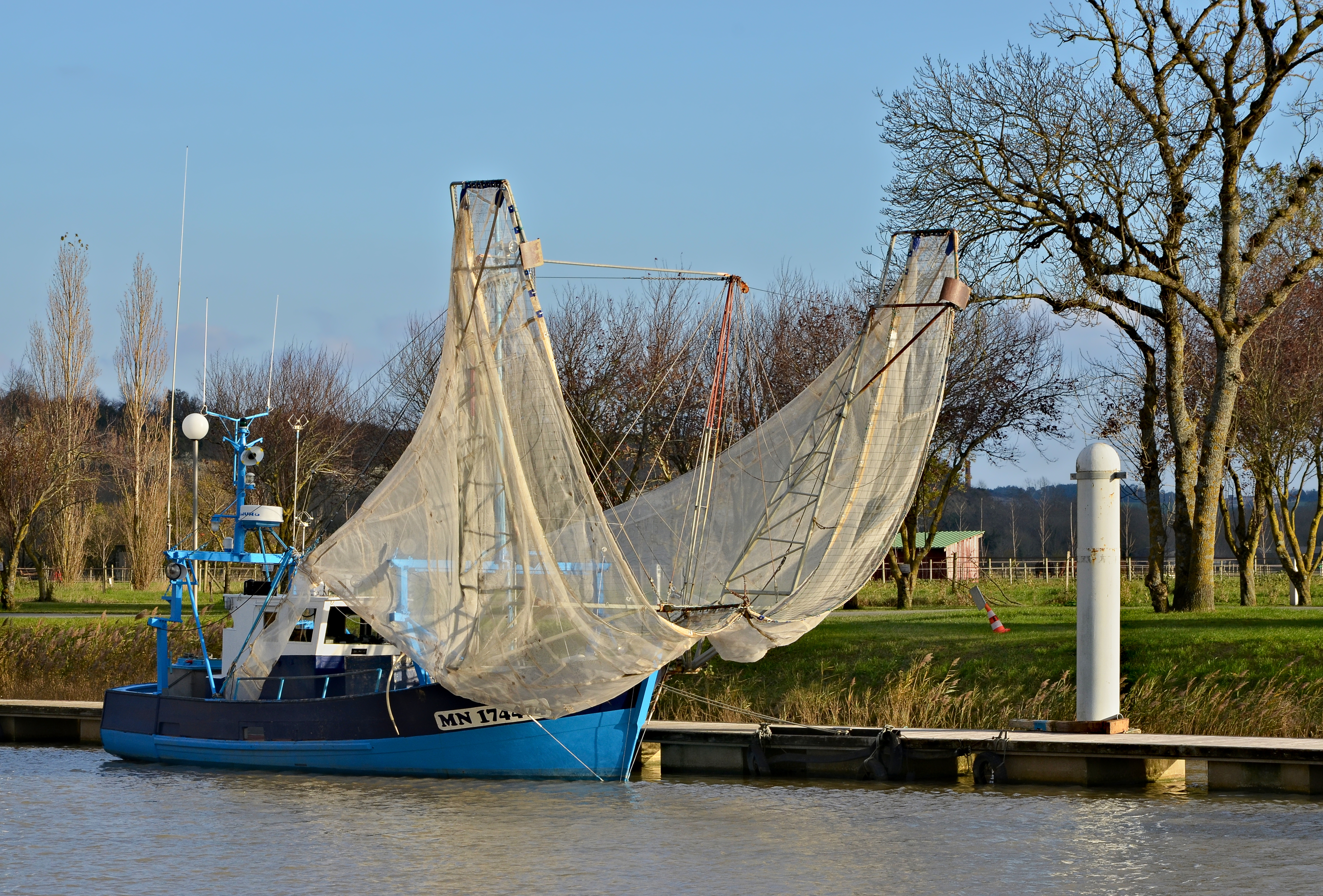
Eel fishing boat in France

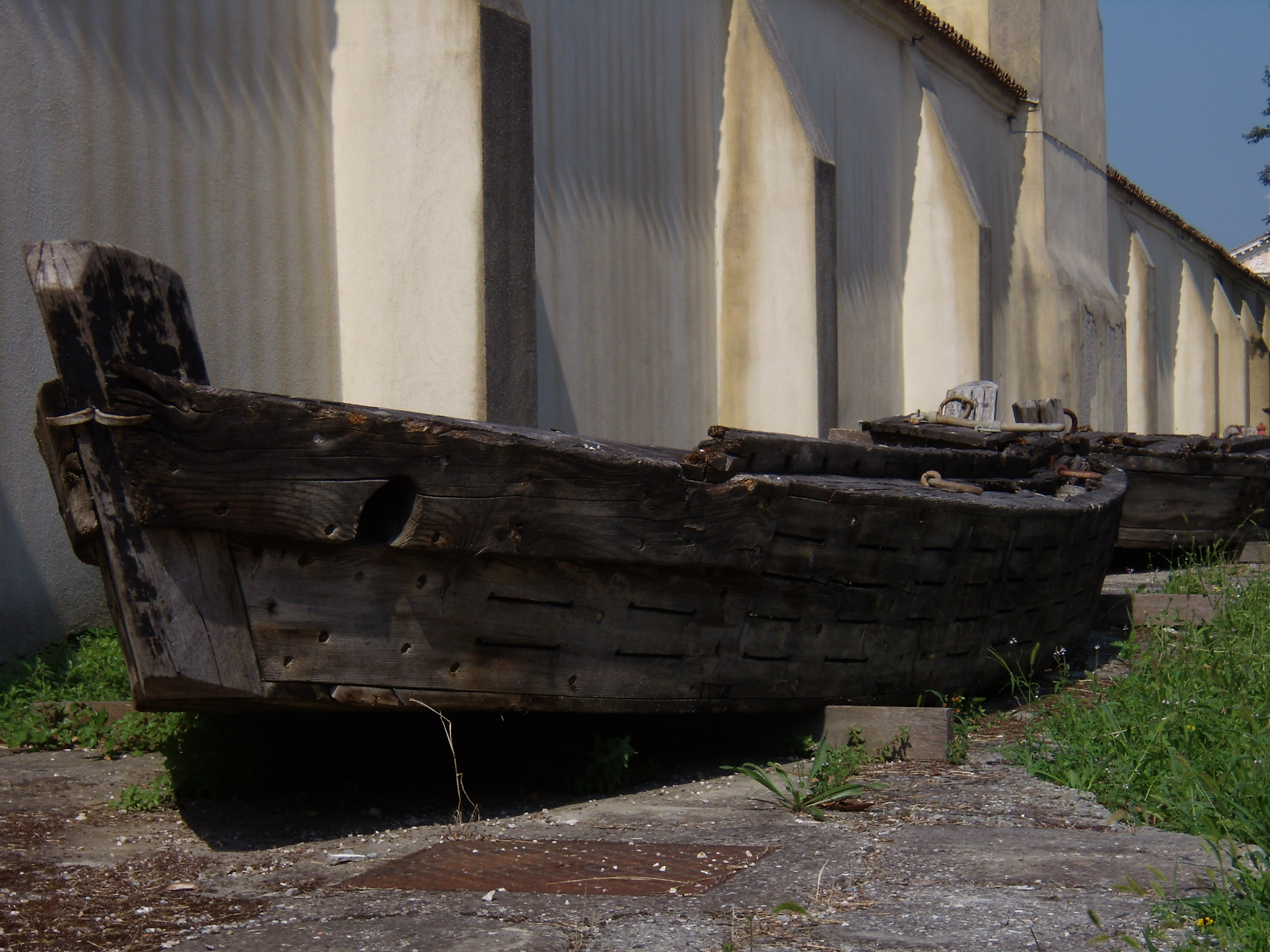
Special boats to transport live eels Comacchio

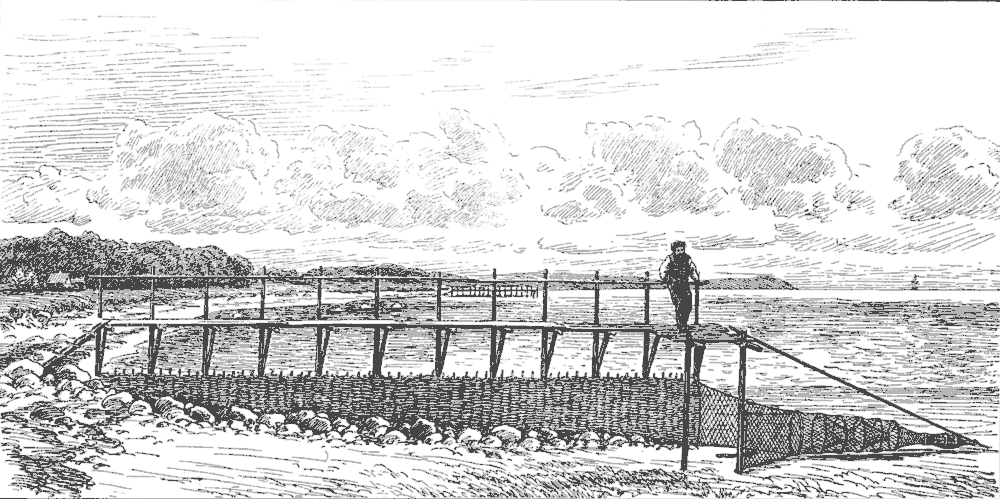
Eel trap in Denmark around 1900

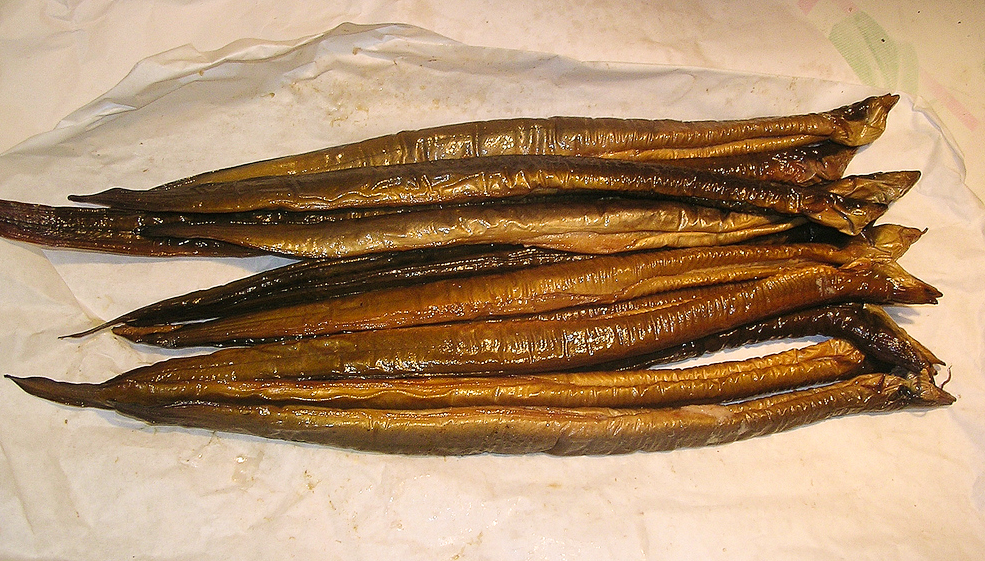
Gerookte paling (Dutch for smoked eel)

== Etymology ==
The English name "eel" descends from Old English ǣl, Common Germanic *ēlaz. Also from the common Germanic are West Frisian iel, Dutch aal, German Aal, and Icelandic áll. Katz (1998) identifies a number of Indo-European cognates, among them the second part of the Latin word for eels, anguilla, attested in its simplex form illa (in a glossary only), and the Greek word for "eel", ἔγχελυς enkhelys (the second part of which is attested in Hesychius as elyes). The first compound member, anguis ("snake"), is cognate to other Indo-European words for "snake" (compare Old Irish escung "eel", Old High German unc "snake", Lithuanian angìs, Greek ophis, okhis, Vedic Sanskrit áhi, Avestan aži, Armenian auj, iž, Old Church Slavonic *ǫžь, all from Proto-Indo-European *h₁ogʷʰis). The word also appears in the Old English word for "hedgehog", which is igil (meaning "snake eater"), and perhaps in the egi- of Old High German egidehsa "wall lizard".

According to this theory, the name Bellerophon (Βελλεροφόντης, attested in a variant Ἐλλεροφόντης in Eustathius of Thessalonica) is also related, translating to "the slayer of the serpent" (ahihán). In this theory, the ελλερο- is an adjective form of an older word, ελλυ, meaning "snake", which is directly comparable to Hittite ellu-essar- "snake pit". This myth likely came to Greece via Anatolia. In the Hittite version of the myth, the dragon is called Illuyanka: the illuy- part is cognate to the word illa, and the -anka part is cognate to angu, a word for "snake". Since the words for "snake" (and similarly shaped animals) are often subject to taboo in many Indo-European (and non-Indo-European) languages, no unambiguous Proto-Indo-European form of the word for eel can be reconstructed. It may have been *ēl(l)-u-, *ēl(l)-o-, or something similar.

== Timeline of genera ==
Timeline

== In culture ==
The ancient cathedral city of Ely in Cambridgeshire, England, derives its name from the eel. The settlement's name originates from a time when eel fishing was a vital local activity in the surrounding fenland waters.

Similarly, the large lake of Almere, which existed in the early Medieval Netherlands, got its name from the eels which lived in its water (the Dutch word for eel is aal or ael, so: "ael mere" = "eel lake"). The name is preserved in the new city of Almere in Flevoland, given in 1984 in memory of this body of water on whose site the town is located.

The daylight passage in the spring of elvers upstream along the Thames was at one time called "eel fare". The word 'elver' is thought to be a corruption of "eel fare".

A famous attraction on the French Polynesian island of Huahine (part of the Society Islands) is the bridge across a stream hosting three- to six-foot-long eels, deemed sacred by local culture.

Eel fishing in Nazi-era Danzig plays an important role in Günter Grass' novel The Tin Drum. The cruelty of humans to eels is used as a metaphor for Nazi atrocities, and the sight of eels being killed by a fisherman triggers the madness of the protagonist's mother.

Sinister implications of eels fishing are also referenced in Jo Nesbø's Cockroaches, the second book of the Harry Hole detective series. The book's background includes a Norwegian village where eels in the nearby sea are rumored to feed on the corpses of drowned humans, making the eating of these eels verge on cannibalism.

The 2019 book The Gospel of the Eels by Patrick Svensson commented on the 'eel question' (origins of the order) and its cultural history.

== See also ==
- Elver pass

== Further references ==
- Tesch FW and White RJ (2008). The Eel. John Wiley & Sons. ISBN 9781405173438.
- Patrik Svensson (2019). The Book of Eels, English translation (2020) by Agnes Broomé, published by ecco, ISBN 9780062968814.
