= Dalmatichthys =

Dalmatichthys Temporal range: Late Cretaceous ("Senonian")

Scientific classification
- Domain: Eukaryota
- Kingdom: Animalia
- Phylum: Chordata
- Class: Actinopterygii
- Order: Polymixiiformes
- Family: †Dalmatichthyidae; Radovčić, 1975
- Genus: †Dalmatichthys; Radovčić, 1975
- Species: †D. malezi

Binomial name
- †Dalmatichthys malezi Radovčić, 1975

Extinct genus of fishes

Dalmatichthys is an extinct genus of marine beardfish from the Late Cretaceous. It contains a single species, D. malezi (named for Mirko Malez) from Croatia. It is the only member of the family Dalmatichthyidae, which is sometimes considered synonymous with Polymixiidae. Its exact relationship to modern beardfish in Polymixia likely needs further research.

== See also ==
- Prehistoric fish
- List of prehistoric bony fish
