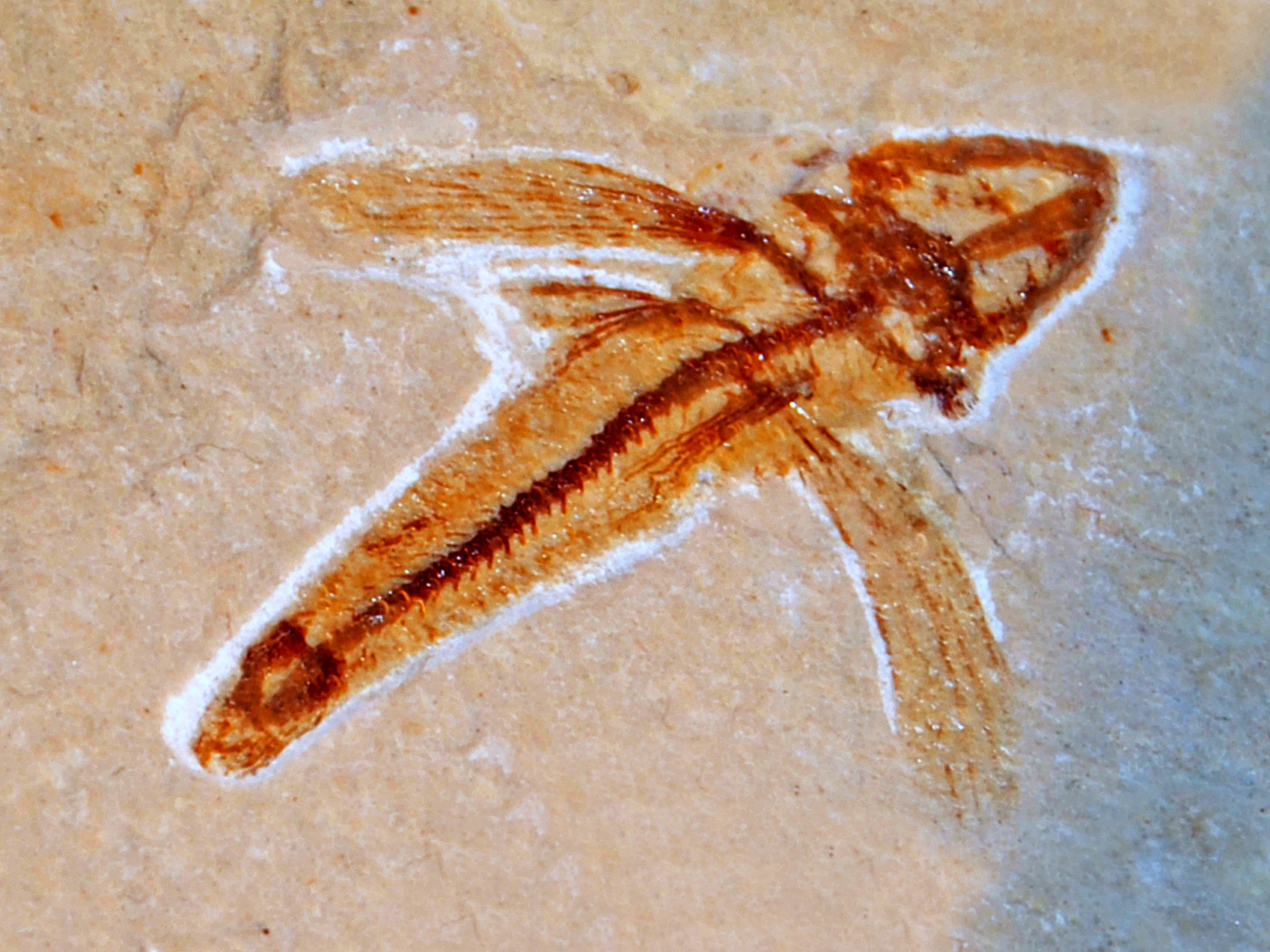
- Fossil of E. minor. Cenomanian of Haqel, Lebanon

Scientific classification
- Kingdom: Animalia
- Phylum: Chordata
- Class: Actinopterygii
- Division: Teleostei
- Order: Aulopiformes (?)
- Family: †Cheirothricidae
- Genus: †Exocoetoides; Davis, 1887
- Species: †E. minor

Binomial name
- †Exocoetoides minor Davis, 1887

= Exocoetoides =

Exocoetoides Temporal range: Late Cenomanian

Extinct genus of ray-finned fishes

Exocoetoides is an extinct genus of prehistoric marine ray-finned fish from the Late Cretaceous. The genus name is derived from its resemblance to Exocoetus, a modern-day flying fish.

It contains a single species, E. minor Davis, 1887, known from the Cenomanian-aged Sannine Formation of Lebanon. "Engraulis evolans" Agassiz, 1835 from the Early Eocene of Monte Bolca, Italy was also assigned to this genus by Gorjanovic-Kramberger (1895), although Grande (1985) found this species to most likely represent a juvenile true flying fish.

== Description ==
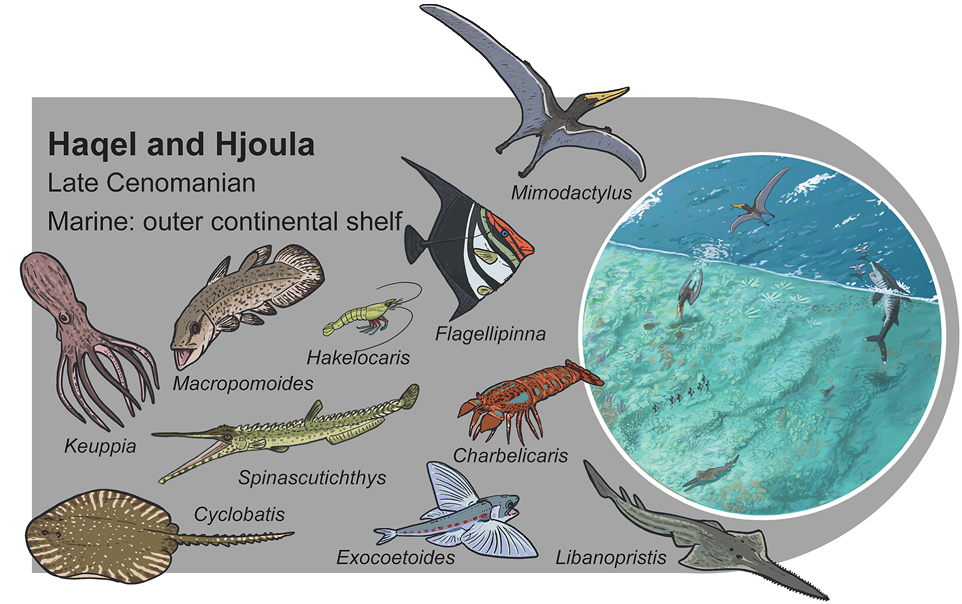
Fauna and depositional environment of the coeval Hakel and Hjoula localities, including Exocoetoides

Exocoetoides species could reach a body length of about 5 cm (2.0 in). The main characteristic of these decidedly small fishes was given by the extreme development of the even fins. In particular, the pectoral fins were particularly long (they could reach the anal region). Also the pelvic fins were large. Moreover the fins were provided with very long rays. In the caudal fin both lobes were the same size.

It differs from the closely related Cheirothrix in having a rounded caudal fin instead of a strongly forked one. In the past it was potentially considered a member of its own family, the Exocoetoididae.

Like today's modern-day flying fish they were also likely to perform a sort of gliding flight over water, thanks to the notable expansion of the pectoral and pelvic fins.
