= Cumbaaichthys =

Cumbaaichthys Temporal range: Turonian

Scientific classification
- Kingdom: Animalia
- Phylum: Chordata
- Class: Actinopterygii
- Order: Polymixiiformes
- Genus: †Cumbaaichthys
- Species: †C. oxyrhynchus

Binomial name
- †Cumbaaichthys oxyrhynchus Murray, 2016

Cumbaaichthys is an extinct genus of marine polymixiiform ray-finned fish that lived during the Turonian stage of the Late Cretaceous epoch. It contains a single species, C. oxyrhynchus, known from Canada. It is a basal polymixiiform of uncertain familial classification.

== Distribution ==
Cumbaaichthys oxyrhynchus is known from Turonian-aged deposits on the shore of Lac des Bois in the Northwest Territories, deposited in the aftermath of the Cenomanian-Turonian boundary event. This locality represents an open-water environment on the northern edge of the Western Interior Seaway, and is potentially correlated with the Cenomanian and Turonian-aged Slater River Formation.
