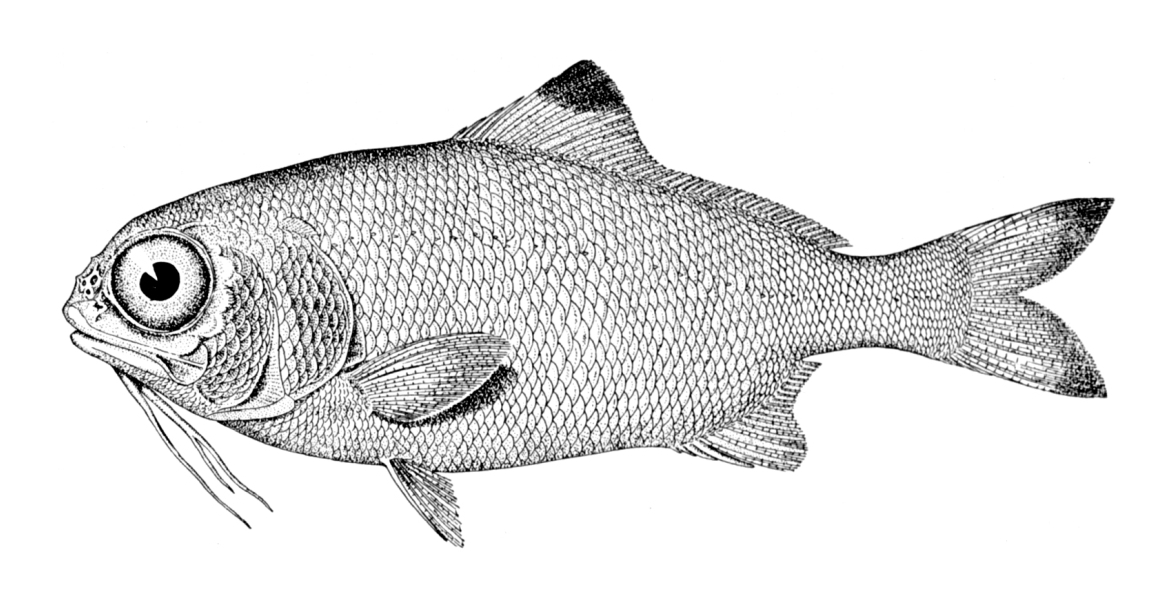
- Polymixia nobilis

Scientific classification
- Kingdom: Animalia
- Phylum: Chordata
- Class: Actinopterygii
- Clade: Acanthomorpha
- Order: Polymixiiformes; Rosen & Patterson, 1969

Type species
- Polymixia nobilis R. T. Lowe, 1838

Families
- †Boreiohydriidae Murray & Cumbaa 2013; †Dalmatichthyidae Radovčić 1975; †Digoriidae Bannikov 1985; †Dinopterygidae Jordan, 1923; Polymixiidae Bleeker, 1859; †Pycnosteroididae Patterson, 1964

Synonyms
- Polymixioidei Bleeker 1859

= Beardfish =

Beardfishes Temporal range: Late Cenomanian to present Possible Albian occurrence

Genus of fishes

The beardfishes consist of a single extant genus, Polymixia, of deep-sea marine ray-finned fish named for their pair of long hyoid barbels. They are classified in their own order Polymixiiformes /pɒliˈmɪksi.ɪfɔːrmiːz/. But as Nelson says, "few groups have been shifted back and forth as frequently as this one, and they were recently added to Paracanthoptergii". For instance, they have previously been classified as belonging to the Beryciformes, and are presently considered either paracanthopterygians or the sister group to acanthopterygians. They are of little economic importance.

They are found in tropical and subtropical waters of the Atlantic, Indian and western Pacific Ocean. They are bottom-dwelling fish, found down to about 800 m (2,600 ft) depth. Most are relatively small fish, although one species, Polymixia berndti, is over 40 cm (16 in) in length.

The earliest body fossils are from the Late Cenomanian of Lebanon, of the genus Pycnosteroides. However, tentative earlier records are known from distinctive fossil otoliths from the Early Cretaceous (Albian) of Texas, USA. Many different fossil families and genera are known from the Late Cretaceous and early Cenozoic, in contrast to the relatively few surviving species in a single genus. Maastrichtian-aged fossils of the genus Elnorichthys indicate that some Cretaceous beardifsh even inhabited freshwater habitats. Extant beardfish can thus be considered "living fossils".

== Classification ==
- Order Polymixiiformes Rosen & Patterson, 1969
  - Genus ?†Allocyclostoma Schwarzhans, Stringer & Welton, 2022 [otolith]
    - †A. alienus Schwarzhans, Stringer & Welton, 2022
  - Genus †Cumbaaichthys Murray 2016
    - †Cumbaaichthys oxyrhynchus Murray 2016
  - Genus †Severnichthys Stringer & Schwarzhans, 2021 [otolith]
    - †S. beauryi (Schwarzhans, 2010)
    - †S. bourdoni Stringer & Schwarzhans, 2021
  - Genus ?†Texoma Schwarzhans, Stringer & Welton, 2022 [otolith]
    - †T. cyclogaster Schwarzhans, Stringer & Welton, 2022
  - Family †Boreiohydriidae Murray & Cumbaa 2013
    - Genus †Boreiohydrias Murray & Cumbaa 2013
      - †Boreiohydrias dayi Murray & Cumbaa 2013
    - Genus †Elnorichthys Murray et al, 2026 (tentatively placed in this family)
      - †Elnorichthys pennockae Murray et al, 2026
  - Family †Dalmatichthyidae Radovčić 1975
    - Genus †Dalmatichthys Radovčić 1975
      - †Dalmatichthys malezi Radovčić 1975
  - Family †Digoriidae Bannikov 1985
    - Genus †Digoria Daniltshenko, 1980
      - †Digoria ambigua Daniltshenko, 1980
  - Family †Dinopterygidae Jordan, 1923
    - Genus †Dinopteryx Woodward, 1901
      - †Dinopteryx spinosus (Davis, 1887)
  - Family Polymixiidae Gill 1862 [Berycopsidae Regan 1911; Dalmatichthyidae Radovčić 1975; Omosomopsidae Gaudant 1978; Homonotichthyidae Whitley 1933]
    - Genus †Apricenaichthys Taverne 2011
      - †Apricenaichthys italicus
    - Genus †Berycopsia Radovčić 1975
      - †Berycopsia inopinnata Radovčić 1975
    - Genus †Berycopsis Dixon 1850 [Platycormus von der Marck 1900]
      - †B. elegans Dixon 1850 [Platycormus elegans (Dixon 1850)]
      - †B. germana (Agassiz 1839) [Beryx germanus Agassiz 1839; Platycormus germanus (Agassiz 1839)]
      - †B. pulcher Bannikov & Bacchia 2004
    - Genus †Cowetaichthys Schwarzhans, Huddleston & Takeuchi, 2018 [otolith]
      - †C. alabamae Schwarzhans, Huddleston & Takeuchi, 2018
      - †C. beauryi (Schwarzhans, 2010)
      - †C. carnevalei Schwarzhans & Stringer, 2020
      - †C. groenlandicus (Schwarzhans, 2004)
      - †C. harderi (Schwarzhans, 2003)
      - †C. lamberi Schwarzhans, Huddleston & Takeuchi, 2018
    - Genus †Homonotichthys Whitley 1933
      - †H. dorsalis (Dixon 1850) [Homonotus dorsalis Dixon 1850]
      - †H. elegans (Dixon 1850) [Homonotus elegans Dixon 1850]
      - †H. rotundus (Woodward 1902) [Homonotus rotundus Woodward 1902]
    - Genus †Namicauda Schwarzhans, Ohe & Ando, 2017 [otolith]
      - †Namicauda pulvinata Schwarzhans, Ohe & Ando, 2017
    - Genus †Omosoma Costa 1857
      - †O. garretti Bardack 1976
      - †O. pulchellum Davis 1887
      - †O. sahelalmae Costa 1857
      - †O. tselfatense Gaudant 1978
    - Genus †Omosomopsis Gaudant 1978
      - †Omosomopsis sima (Arambourg 1954) Gaudant 1978
    - Genus †Parapolymixia David 1946
      - †Parapolymixia californica David 1946
    - Genus †Pycnosterinx Heckel 1849 [Imogaster Costa 1857]
      - †P. discoides Heckel 1849
      - †P. dorsalis Pictet 1850
      - †P. heckelii Pictet 1850
      - †P. latus Davis 1887
      - †P. russeggeri Heckel 1849 [Homonotus pulcher Davis 1886]
    - Genus Polymixia Lowe 1836 [Dinemus Poey 1860; Nemobrama Valenciennes 1860 non Jordan, Evermann & Clark 1930]
      - P. berndti Gilbert 1905 (Pacific beardfish)
      - P. busakhini Kotlyar 1993 (Busakhin's beardfish)
      - P. carmenae Caixeta, Oliveira & de Melo, 2024 (Brazilian beardfish)
      - P. fusca Kotthaus 1970
      - †?P. harderi (Schwarzhans 2003) [otolith]
      - P. hollisterae Grande & Wilson, 2021 (Bermuda beardfish)
      - P. japonica Günther 1877 (Silver eye)
      - P. longispina Deng, Xiong & Zhan 1983 [Polymixia kawadae Okamura & Ema 1985]
      - P. lowei Günther 1859 (Beardfish)
      - P. nobilis Lowe 1838 [Nemobrama webbii Valenciennes 1837; Dinemus venustus Poey 1860; Polymixia nobilis virginica Nichols & Firth 1936] (Stout beardfish)
      - †P. polita Schwarzhans 2012 [otolith]
      - P. salagomeziensis Kotlyar 1991
      - P. sazonovi Kotlyar 1992
      - P. yuri Kotlyar 1982
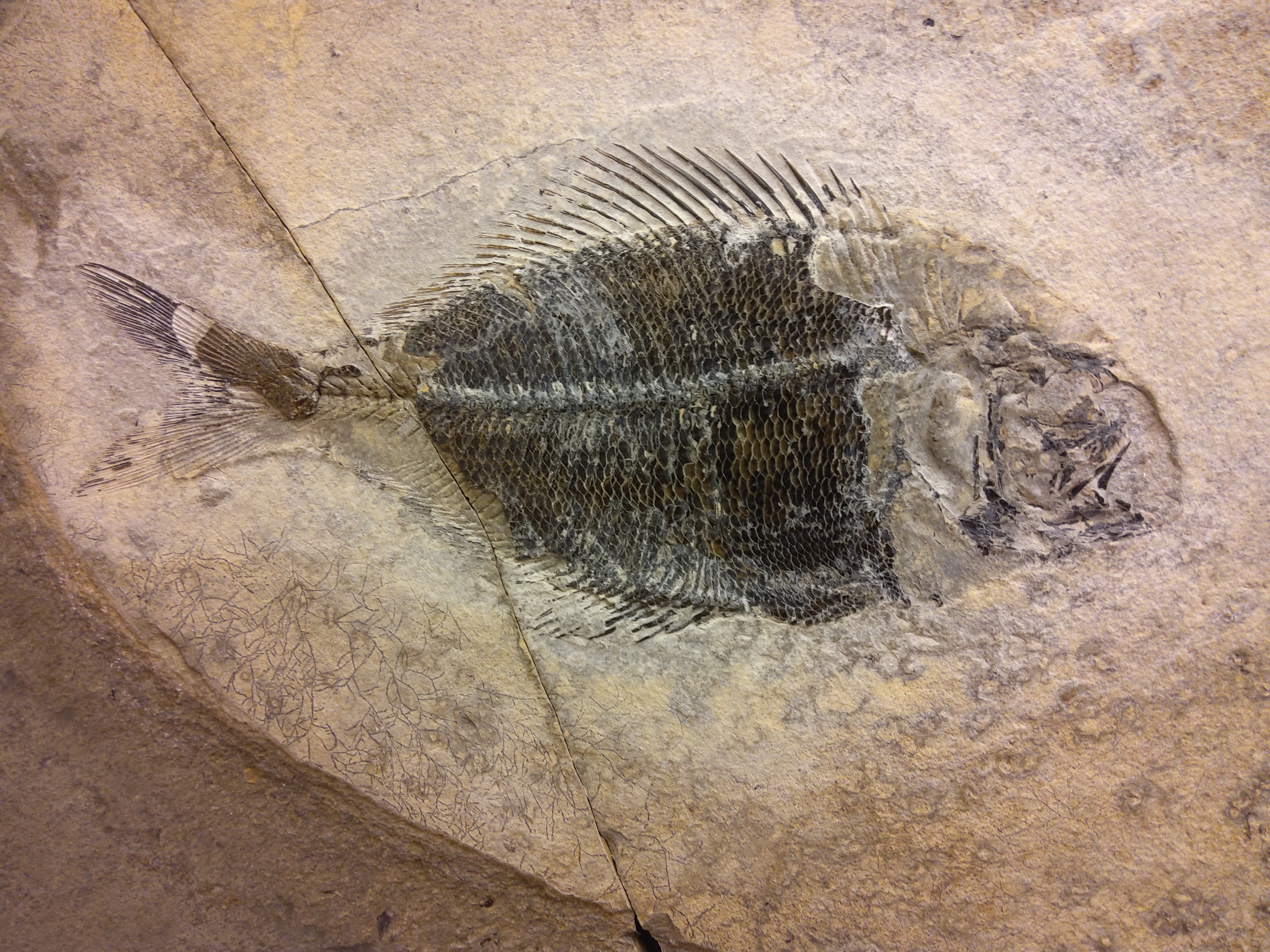
        Fossil of Polyspinatus
    - Genus †Polyspinatus Schrøder, Rasmussen, Møller & Carnevale, 2022
      - †Polyspinatus fluere Schrøder, Rasmussen, Møller & Carnevale, 2022
  - Family †Pycnosteroididae Patterson, 1964
    - Genus †Magrebichthys Murray & Wilson 2014
      - †Magrebichthys nelsoni Murray & Wilson 2014
    - Genus †Pycnosteroides Woodward, 1942
      - †Pycnosteroides levispinosus (Hay, 1903)
