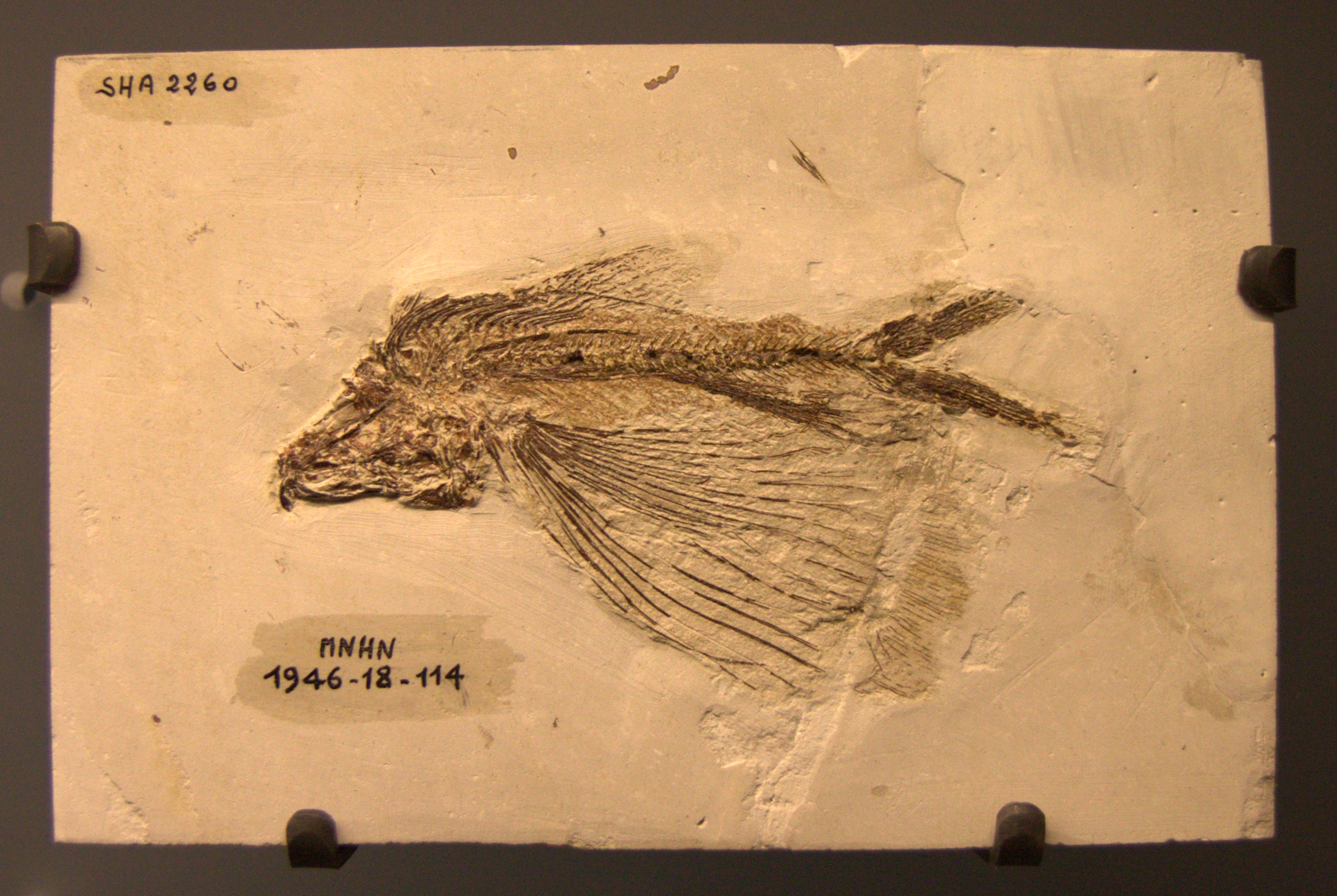
- Fossil of Cheirothrix lewisii

Scientific classification
- Kingdom: Animalia
- Phylum: Chordata
- Class: Actinopterygii
- Division: Teleostei
- Order: Aulopiformes (?)
- Family: †Cheirothricidae; Woodward, 1901

Genera
- See text

= Cheirothricidae =

Cheirothricidae Temporal range: Late Cenomanian to Campanian

Extinct family of ray-finned fishes

Cheirothricidae is a family of extinct marine ray-finned fish, perhaps belonging to the Aulopiformes, although they are tentatively placed as indeterminate eurypterygians. They lived during the Upper Cretaceous (Cenomanian - Campanian, about 95 - 71 million years ago) and their fossil remains are found in the Middle East and Europe. They were characterized by very expanded even fins.

== Genera ==
- †Cheirothrix Pictet and Humbert, 1866 - Late Santonian to Campanian of Germany and Lebanon
- †Exocoetoides Davis, 1887 - Late Cenomanian of Lebanon
- ?†Telepholis von der Marck, 1868 - Late Campanian of Germany (possibly a stem-stomiiform)

== Description ==
The main characteristic of these small fish (the length of the body was usually between 3 and 20 centimeters in length) was given by the extreme development of the even fins; in Cheirothrix species the pectoral fins were particularly developed, while in Telepholis and Exocoetoides also the pelvic fins were large. In any case, the fins were large and provided with very long rays.

Cheirothrix was the largest genus, had a more robust body and could reach 20 centimeters in length; Telepholis, usually shorter and with a thinner body, had shorter pectoral fins than Exocoetoides and had some small and thin shields in the dorsal region, rounded or polygonal, adorned in the center with a tubercle. The caudal fin was not very indented. However, Telepholis may not be a cheirothricid.

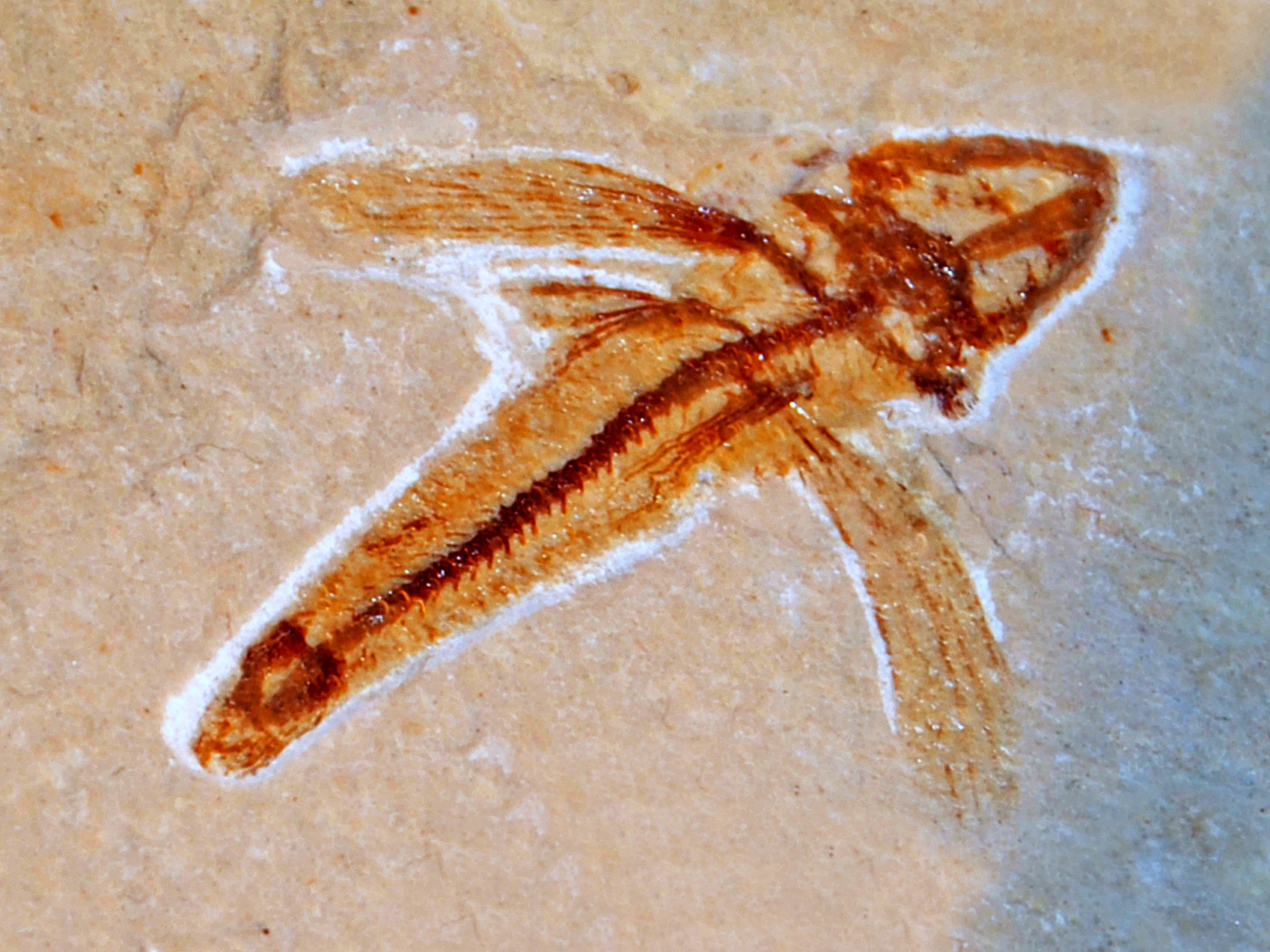
Fossil of Exocoetoides minor

Exocoetoides, on the other hand, was decidedly small in size (between 3 and 7 centimeters in length) and the pectoral fins were particularly long (they could reach the anal region); in the caudal fin both lobes were the same size.

== Taxonomy and fossil record ==
Established in 1901 by Arthur Smith Woodward, the family Cheirothricidae was widespread in the ancient Tethys Ocean, in the areas currently occupied by the Middle East and Europe.

Two genera are known in the Cretaceous of Lebanon (Cheirothrix in deposits of the Santonian, and Exocoetoides from the Cenomanian), and in Germany (Cheirothrix and Telepholis from the Campanian).

Members of this family are generally considered to be representatives of the Aulopiformes; in particular, affinities have been proposed with the extinct group of Enchodontidae. However, a 2009 study found them to be indeterminate members of the Eurypterygii.

== Paleobiology ==
The Cheirothricidae had a morphology remarkably similar to that of the extant flying fishes and to that of other extinct forms like Thoracopterus. Like today's Cypselurus and Exocoetus, Cheirothricidae were also likely to perform a sort of gliding flight over water, thanks to the notable expansion of the pectoral and pelvic fins.

== Bibliography ==
- James W. Davis (1887). "The fossil fishes of the chalk of Mount Lebanon in Syria". Royal Dublin Society. 2 (3).
- M. Gayet, A. Belouze & P. Abi Saad, 2003. Les Poissons fossiles. Éditions Desiris,. 158 p.
