= Boreiohydrias =

Boreiohydrias Temporal range: Turonian

Scientific classification
- Kingdom: Animalia
- Phylum: Chordata
- Class: Actinopterygii
- Division: Teleostei
- Order: Polymixiiformes
- Family: †Boreiohydriidae
- Genus: †Boreiohydrias
- Species: †B. dayi

Binomial name
- †Boreiohydrias dayi Murray & Cumbaa, 2013

Extinct genus of fishes

Boreiohydrias is an extinct genus of marine polymixiiform ray-finned fish, related to modern beardfish, that lived during the Turonian stage of the Late Cretaceous epoch. It is the only confirmed member of the family Boreiohydriidae, although a second potential freshwater boreiohydriid is known in Elnorichthys from the Maastrichtian of Alberta.

== Distribution ==
Boreiohydrias dayi is known from the shore of Lac des Bois in the Northwest Territories, Canada, in Turonian-aged sediments deposited in the aftermath of the Cenomanian-Turonian boundary event. This locality represents an open-water environment on the northern edge of the Western Interior Seaway, and is potentially correlated with the Cenomanian and Turonian-aged Slater River Formation.
