= Dinopteryx =

Dinopteryx Temporal range: Late Santonian

Scientific classification
- Kingdom: Animalia
- Phylum: Chordata
- Class: Actinopterygii
- Order: Polymixiiformes
- Family: †Dinopterygidae; Jordan, 1923
- Genus: †Dinopteryx; Woodward, 1901
- Species: †D. spinosus

Binomial name
- †Dinopteryx spinosus (Davis, 1887)

Synonyms
- †Hoplopteryx spinosus Davis, 1887

Extinct genus of fishes

Dinopteryx ("terrible wing") is an extinct genus of prehistoric beardfish from the Late Cretaceous period. It contains a single species, D. spinosus, known from the Santonian of Lebanon (Sahel Alma). It is the only member of the extinct family Dinopterygidae, which is considered a distinct family of the Polymixiiformes. It was previously placed in the genus Hoplopteryx.

== See also ==
- Prehistoric fish
- List of prehistoric bony fish
