= Paraipichthys =

Paraipichthys Temporal range: Lower Cenomanian

Scientific classification
- Domain: Eukaryota
- Kingdom: Animalia
- Phylum: Chordata
- Class: Actinopterygii
- Order: Polymixiiformes
- Genus: †Paraipichthys; Gaudant, 1978

Extinct genus of fishes

Paraipichthys is an extinct genus of prehistoric bony fish that lived during the lower Cenomanian.

== See also ==
- Prehistoric fish
- List of prehistoric bony fish
