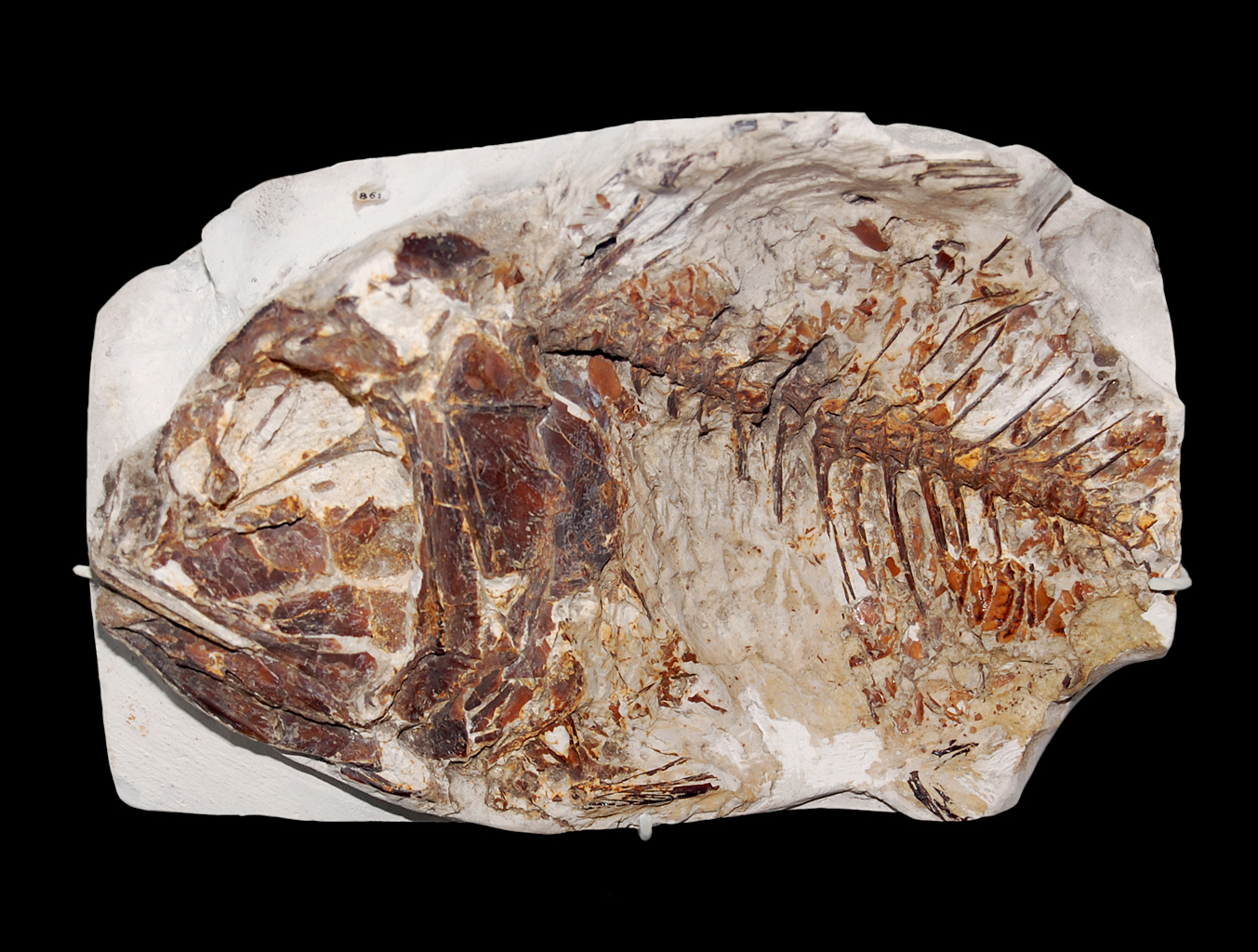
- Specimen of B. elegans at Oxford University Museum of Natural History

Scientific classification
- Domain: Eukaryota
- Kingdom: Animalia
- Phylum: Chordata
- Class: Actinopterygii
- Order: Polymixiiformes
- Family: Polymixiidae
- Genus: †Berycopsis; Agassiz in Dixon, 1850

Type species
- †Berycopsis elegans Dixon, 1850

Species
- See text

= Berycopsis =

Berycopsis Temporal range: Cenomanian–Campanian

Extinct genus of fishes

Berycopsis is an extinct genus of marine ray-finned fish from the Late Cretaceous period. Fossils are known from England, Germany, and Lebanon. A potential specimen is known from the Czech Republic.

It is generally placed among the beardfish in the family Polymixiidae. However, one 2009 study found it to be a more basal acanthomorph, and tentatively placed it as Beryciformes incertae sedis. However, later studies have continued to place it in the Polymixiidae.

The following species are known:

- B. elegans Dixon, 1850 - Early Cenomanian to Turonian of the United Kingdom (Chalk Group)
- B. germanus (Agassiz, 1839) - Late Campanian of Germany (syn: Platycormus germanus Agassiz, 1839, B. oblongus von der Marck 1863)
- B. paucoradius Dietze, 2009 - Late Campanian of Germany
- B. pulcher Bannikov & Bacchia, 2005 - Late Cenomanian of Lebanon (Sannine Formation)

The species "B." lindstromi Davis, 1890 from the Danian-aged Kobenhavn Limestone of Limhamns kalkbrott, Sweden, is based on a generically indeterminate partial skeleton, and thus its taxonomic affiliation is uncertain. The species Platycormus gibbosus von der Marck, 1885 may also belong to this genus, but the holotype has been lost and thus nothing about it is known. B. elegans and B. germanus may also be synonymous with each other, but not enough about the former's morphology to decide this.

Berycopsis was about 35 centimetres (14 in) long and one of the earliest known members of the Acanthopterygii, the group that includes the present day barracuda, swordfish, seahorses, and flatfish. Like its modern relatives, the first fin rays in the dorsal and anal fins were modified into defensive spines, and the pelvic fins were located close to the pectoral fins. Berycopsis was one of the earliest fish known to have these features, which are widespread today.
