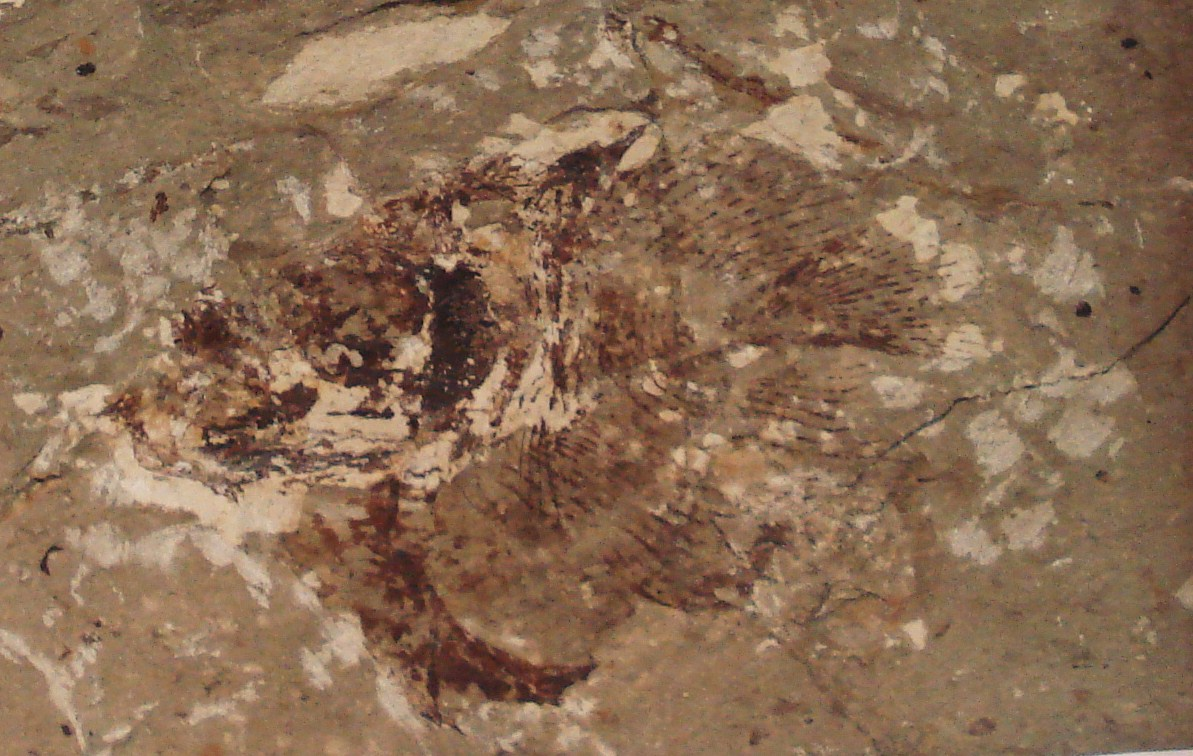
- Pycnosterinx latus

Scientific classification
- Kingdom: Animalia
- Phylum: Chordata
- Class: Actinopterygii
- Division: Teleostei
- Order: Polymixiiformes
- Family: Polymixiidae
- Genus: †Pycnosterinx; Heckel in Russegger, 1849

= Pycnosterinx =

Pycnosterinx Temporal range: Santonian

Extinct genus of fishes

Pycnosterinx is an extinct genus of prehistoric bony fish that lived during the Santonian.

== See also ==
- Prehistoric fish
- List of prehistoric bony fish
