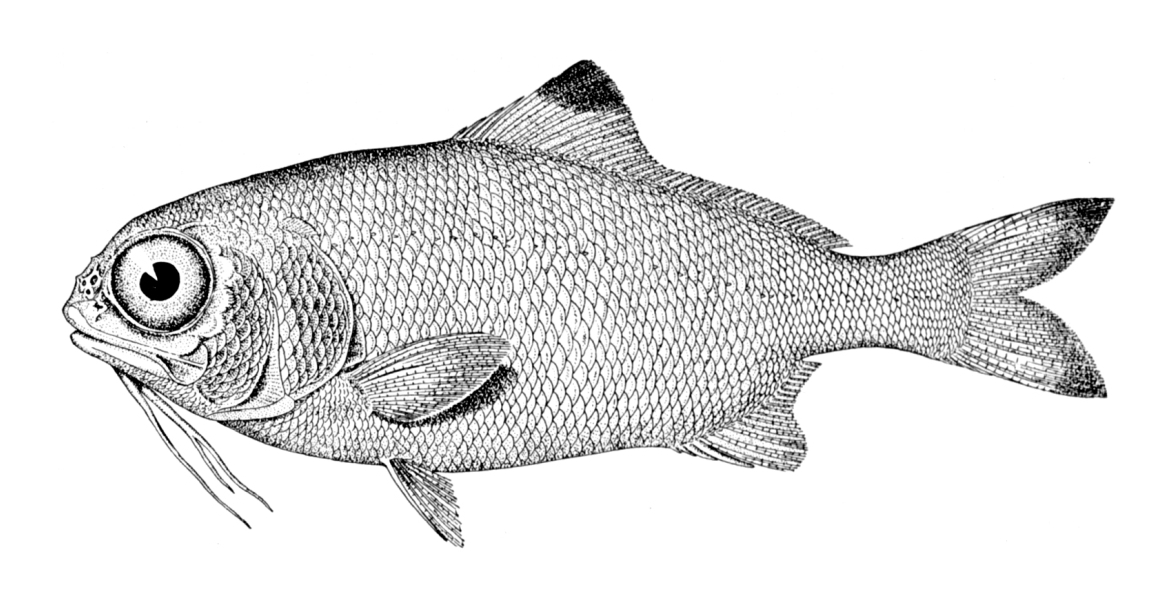

Conservation status
- Least Concern (IUCN 3.1)

Scientific classification
- Kingdom: Animalia
- Phylum: Chordata
- Class: Actinopterygii
- Order: Polymixiiformes
- Family: Polymixiidae
- Genus: Polymixia
- Species: P. nobilis

Binomial name
- Polymixia nobilis R. T. Lowe, 1838

= Polymixia nobilis =

Species of fish

Polymixia nobilis, the stout beardfish, is a species of beardfish. This species can grow over 48 centimetres (19 in) TL. The species' dorsal fin has five spines and 34-27 soft rays and 10-13 gill rakers. The habitat of the fish is in the benthic zone.

== Habitat ==
P. nobilis lives on both sides of the Atlantic Ocean and range from Bermuda to Guyana. gravel and sandy bottoms, preferring soft bottoms and reefs. These bottom feeders live at a depth of 70-800 meters in-shore. These fish contain separate species in the East Atlantic from the West Atlantic Ocean and Bermuda population.

== Feeding ==
These broadfish are carnivores that consume bony fish, octopuses, squid, and cuttlefish.

== Reproduction ==
P. nobilis lays eggs that develop into pelagic larva.
