= Homonotichthys =

Homonotichthys Temporal range: Cenomanian to Turonian

Scientific classification
- Kingdom: Animalia
- Phylum: Chordata
- Class: Actinopterygii
- Order: Polymixiiformes
- Family: Polymixiidae
- Genus: †Homonotichthys; Whitley, 1933

Type species
- †Homonotus dorsalis Dixon, 1850

Species
- H. dorsalis (Dixon, 1850); H. pulchellus (Dixon, 1850); H. rotundus (Woodward, 1902)

Synonyms
- Homonotus Dixon, 1850 (preocc.)

Extinct genus of fishes

Homonotichthys is an extinct genus of beardfish known from the Late Cretaceous of Europe. Three species are known from the Cenomanian to Turonian of England. The genus name Homonotichthys was coined to replace the genus name Homonotus, preoccupied by a genus of pompilid wasp, which the species were originally placed in.

The following species are known:

- †H. dorsalis (Dixon, 1850) - Cenomanian to Turonian of England (English Chalk)
- †H. pulchellus (Dixon, 1850) - Cenomanian of England (English Chalk)
- †H. rotundus (Woodward, 1902) - Cenomanian of England (English Chalk)

== See also ==
- Prehistoric fish
- List of prehistoric bony fish
