= Berycopsia =

Berycopsia Temporal range: Turonian

Scientific classification
- Kingdom: Animalia
- Phylum: Chordata
- Class: Actinopterygii
- Order: Polymixiiformes
- Family: Polymixiidae
- Genus: †Berycopsia; Radovčić, 1975
- Species: †B. inopinnata

Binomial name
- †Berycopsia inopinnata Radovčić, 1975

Extinct genus of fishes

Berycopsia is an extinct genus of beardfish that lived during the Turonian stage of the Late Cretaceous. It contains a single species, B. inopinnata, that inhabited marine habitats of the Tethys Sea around what is now Croatia.

== See also ==
- Prehistoric fish
- List of prehistoric bony fish
