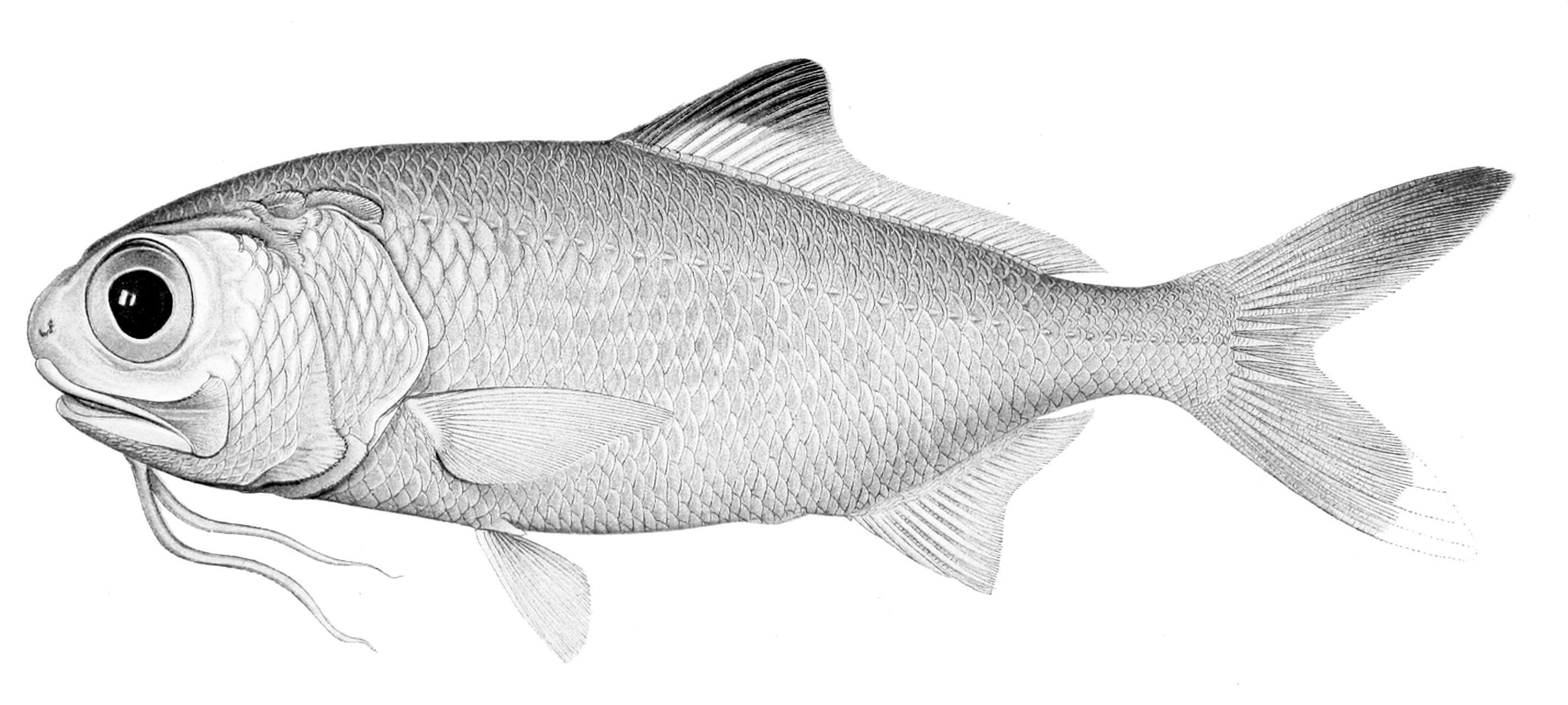

Conservation status
- Least Concern (IUCN 3.1)

Scientific classification
- Kingdom: Animalia
- Phylum: Chordata
- Class: Actinopterygii
- Order: Polymixiiformes
- Family: Polymixiidae
- Genus: Polymixia
- Species: P. berndti

Binomial name
- Polymixia berndti C. H. Gilbert, 1905

= Polymixia berndti =

Species of fish

Polymixia berndti is a species of beardfish found in the Indian and Pacific Oceans. This species grows to a length of 47.5 centimetres (18.7 in) SL.

== Appearance and anatomy ==
The species has 4-5 dorsal spines and 28-31 dorsal soft rays. It is usually dusky-greenish or silver.

== Environment and climate ==
Polymixia berndti is found in reef-associated deep water locations in the Indo-Pacific Ocean. The species is also distributed below Australia, north of Japan, and in the aquatic region from East Africa to the Hawaiian Islands.

Polymixia berndti has a depth range of 18 – 585 m.
