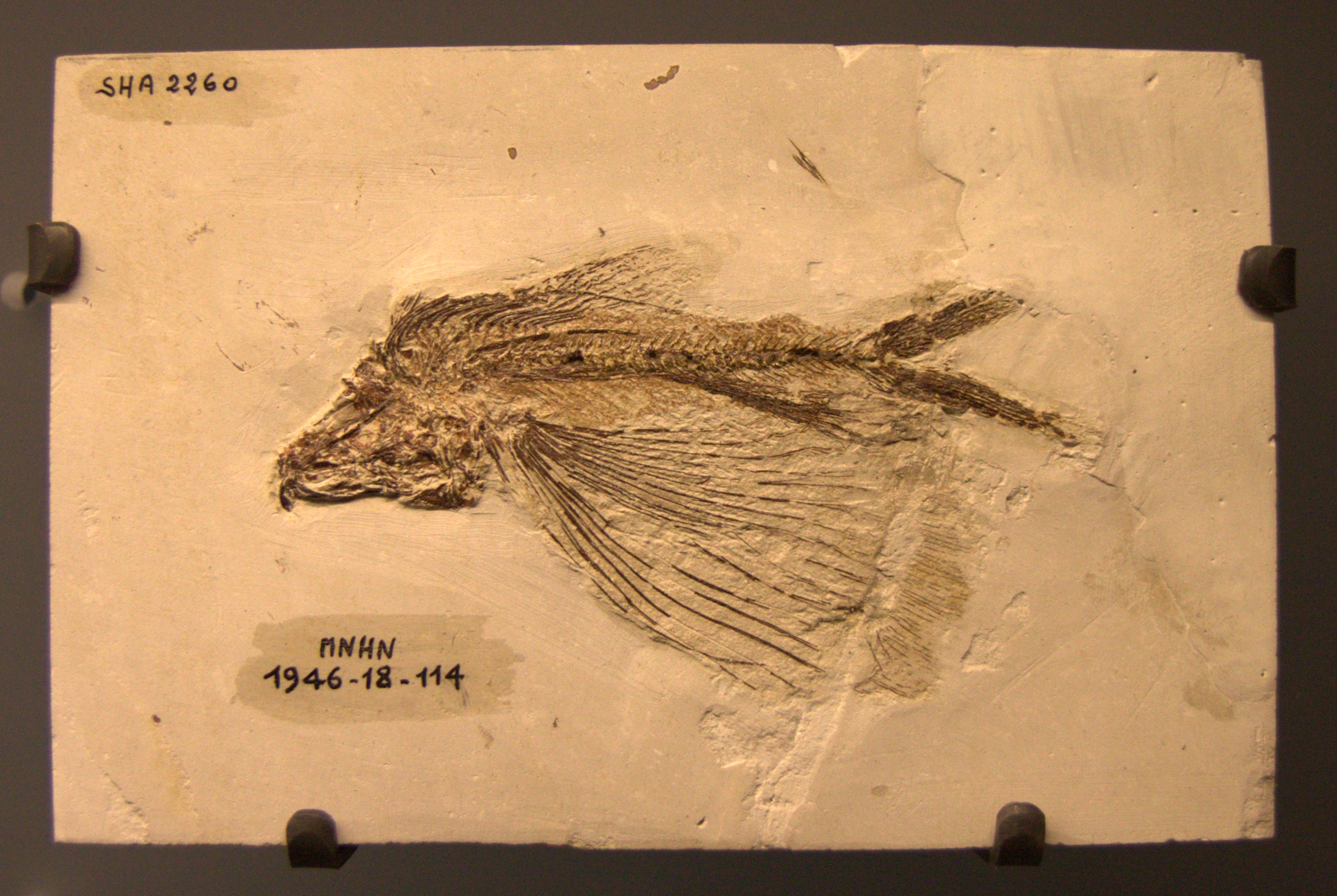
- Specimen of C. lewisii

Scientific classification
- Domain: Eukaryota
- Kingdom: Animalia
- Phylum: Chordata
- Class: Actinopterygii
- Order: Aulopiformes (?)
- Family: †Cheirothricidae
- Genus: †Cheirothrix; Pictet & Humbert, 1866

Species
- †C. guestphalicus von der March & Schlüter, 1868; †C. lewisii Davis, 1887; †C. libanicus Pictet & Humbert, 1866

Synonyms
- Chirothrix, Chirotrix, Cheirotrix (misspellings)

= Cheirothrix =

Cheirothrix Temporal range: Late Santonian to Campanian

Extinct genus of ray-finned fishes

Cheirothrix (meaning "hand hair") is an extinct genus of marine ray-finned fish from the Late Cretaceous. It is named for its enlarged pectoral fins, which show close convergence with modern flying fish.

== Taxonomy ==
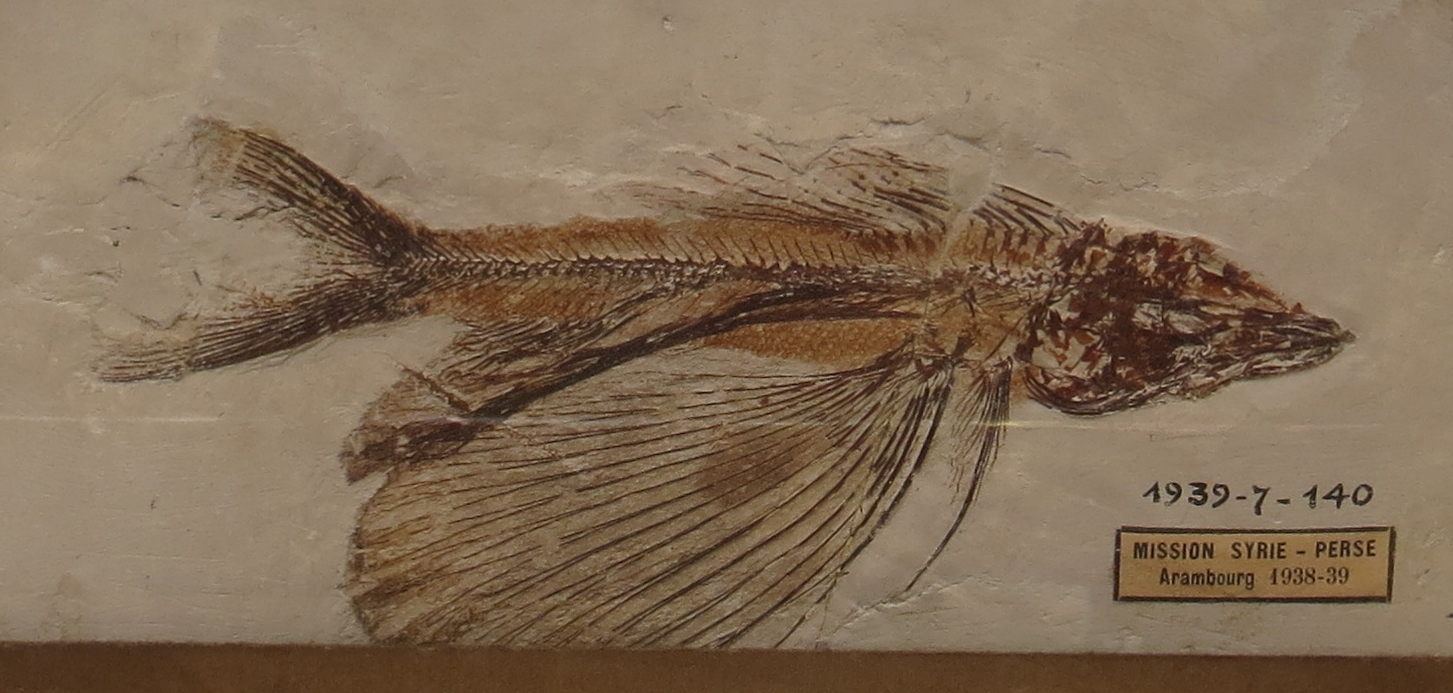
Specimen of C. libanicus

The following species are known:

- †C. guestphalicus (von der Marck & Schlüter, 1868) - Late Campanian of Germany (=Telepholis biantennatus von der Marck, 1873, Megapus guestphalicus von der Marck & Schlüter, 1868)
- †C. lewisii Davis, 1887 - Late Santonian of Lebanon (Sahel Alma)
- †C. libanicus Pictet & Humbert, 1866 - Late Santonian of Lebanon (Sahel Alma)

The fossilised remains of Cheirothrix lewisii were found in limestone strata in Lebanon dating back about 85 million years. This fish was first described by James William Davis in 1887 and was named in honour of Professor E. R. Lewis of the American College in Beirut. Professor Lewis had originally found the fossil at Sahel Alma on Mount Lebanon. In this famous fossil location, about sixty species of fish have been found, none of them known from elsewhere in the world.

== Description ==
Cheirothrix is characterized by enormous pectoral fins and the ventral lobe of the tail fin is also much enlarged. It seems likely that these fish could launch themselves out of the water and glide hundreds of metres (yards) through the air, probably to evade predators.

== Distribution ==
During the Cretaceous period, sea levels were much higher than they are now. The fish remains at Sahel Alma are very well preserved. The rock is a fine-grained limestone found in an area much folded and faulted and is laid down in thick beds. The fish may have died because of a localized shortage of oxygen. Five specimens of Cheirothrix lewisii were found, each preserved in such detail that the fifty or so vertebrae can be counted and the branching rays of the pectoral fins can be seen clearly. The holotype is a cleft slab of limestone with remains of the fish on both sides. It is now kept in the Natural History Museum in London.

Another member of the genus, Cheirothrix libanicus, is found in the same fossil bed and other members of the genus are known from 84-to-70-million-year-old deposits in Germany.
