= Veternica bibliography =

Bibliography of Veternica cave

This is a bibliography of works on the Veternica cave. The most recent bibliography dedicated to Veternica was published in 2011, but the most comprehensive bibliographies were published in the 2023 edition of Speleolog, covering its evolution, history and archaeology. An even more extensive bibliography was produced by the Komisija za speleologiju HPS-a in 2021, but it remains unpublished.

== General ==
- Poljak, Josip (1934). "Pećina "Veternica" u Zagrebačkoj gori" ["Veternica" Cave in Zagrebačka gora]. Priroda. Vol. 24, no. 5. pp. 133–139. ISSN 0351-0662.
- Baučić, Frano (1945). Podaci o pećinama [Facts About Caves]. Zagreb.
- Božičević, Srećko (1959). "Pećina Veternica nekada, sada i u budućnosti" [Veternica Cave Once, Now and in the Future]. Speleolog. 7–8 (7–8) (published 1960-12-01): 7–24. ISSN 0490-4109.
- Malez, Mirko (1965). Pećina Veternica u Medvednici [Veternica Cave in Medvednica]. Prirodoslovna istraživanja Jugoslavenske akademije znanosti i umjetnosti. Vol. 35.
- Čepelak, Marijan (1976). "Novija i buduća speleološka istraživanja u Veternici" [Recent and Coming Speleological Explorations in "Veternica"]. Speleolog. 24–25 (24–25) (published 1977-12-01): 1–8. ISSN 0490-4109.
- — (1979). "Objašnjenja uz nacrt špilje Veternice" [Explanations with a Map of Veternica Cave]. Speleolog. 26–27 (26–27) (published 1980-01-02): 33–34. ISSN 0490-4109.
- Brbot, Stjepan (2010). "Špilja Veternica" [Veternica Cave]. Medvednica.info.
- Ozimec, Roman; Šincek, Dubravko (2011-06-14). "Speleological objects of NW Croatia mountains". Radovi Zavoda za znanstveni rad Varaždin (22): 201–232. eISSN 1848-7890.

== History ==
- Gorjanović-Kramberger, Dragutin (1899). "Krš Zagrebačke gore" [Karst of the Zagrebačka gora] (PDF). Hrvatski planinar: Viestnik "Hrvatskoga planinarstkoga družtva" u Zagrebu. Vol. 2, no. 11. pp. 161–164. ISSN 0354-0650.
- Hirc, Dragutin (1902). "Zanimljive špilje" [Interesting Caves] (PDF). Hrvatski planinar. Vol. 5, no. 9–10. p. 80. ISSN 0354-0650.
- — (1903). "U zapadnom prigorju Zagrebačke gore" [In the Western Foothills of the Zagreb Mountains] (PDF). Hrvatski planinar. Vol. 6, no. 1–2. pp. 7–10. ISSN 0354-0650.
- — (1905). "Zagorje". Prirodni zemljopis Hrvatske. pp. 134–171.
- Gršetić, Stanko (1934-03-08). "Senzacija za koju nitko u Zagrebu ne zna: Ogromne, raskošne i tajanstvene špilje u Zagrebačkoj gori" [A Sensation About Which No One in Zagreb Knows: Enormous, Decorated and Mysterious Caves in the Zagreb Mountains] (Interview). Interviewed by Urednik. p. 1 – via Večer.
- Lončar, Vladimir (1966). "Speleološke uspomene" [Speleological Remembrances]. Speleolog. 14–15 (14–15) (published 1967-12-01): 15. ISSN 0490-4109.
- Čepelak, Radovan (1968). "Otkriven još jedan kanal u špilji Veternici" [Yet Another Canal Discovered in the Veternica Cave] (PDF). Naše planine. No. 3–4. p. 90. ISSN 0027-819X.
- — (1969). "O istraživanju Paklenog kanala u Veternici" [On the Exploration of the Hell Canal in Veternica] (PDF). Naše planine. No. 5–6. p. 139. ISSN 0027-819X.
- Malez, Mirko (1974). "Noviji rezultati istraživanja paleolitika u Velikoj pećini, Veternici i Šandalji" [Newer Results of Paleolithic Explorations in Velika pećina, Veternica and Šandalja]. Arheološki radovi i rasprave. 7: 7–44. ISSN 0570-8958.
- Božičević, Srećko (1974). "Hidrogeologija pećine Veternice kraj Zagreba na planini Medvednici". Osmi jugoslavenski geološki kongres [Hydrogeology of the veternica Cave by Zagreb on Mount Medvednica]. Vol. 4. pp. 5–12.
- Posarić, Juraj (1982). "Umjetni materijali u svladavanju špiljskih voda" [Artificial Materials in Overcoming Cave Waters] (PDF). Naše planine. No. 3–4. pp. 85–87. ISSN 0354-0650.
- Sutlović, Ana (1992). "Novi metri u staroj Veternici" [New Meters in Old Veternica]. Velebiten. 8: 34–36. ISSN 1332-6651.
- Božić, Vlado (2001). "Veternica zatvorena za javnost" [Veternica Closed to the Public] (PDF). Hrvatski planinar. No. 2. p. 59. ISSN 0354-0650.
- Bedek, Jana; Hamidović, Daniela; Ozimec, Roman (2003). "Nužnost speleološke studije za planiranje upravljanja turističkom špiljom – primjer Veternice kraj Zagreba" [Necessity of speleological elaborate for touristic caves management – example Veternica cave near Zagreb]. Zbornik sažetaka osmog hrvatskog biološkog kongresa. Hrvatsko biološko društvo. pp. 404–405. ISBN 953-6241-05-6.
- Bolonić, Zoran; Božić, Vlado; Čepelak, Marijan; Lacković, Damir; Malinar, Hrvoje; Medenica, Tila (2024-03-04). "Povijest speleoloških istraživanja i uređivanja špilje Veternice" [History of Speleological Exploration and Development of the Veternica Cave]. Speleolog. 71 (71): 8–25. eISSN 2623-7385.
- Ban Čurić, Tajana; Kovačić, Denis; Kostelić, Andrea; Popijač, Marina; Rapaić, Igor (2024-03-04). "Održivo upravljanje geomorfološkim spomenikom prirode špiljom Veternicom u Parku prirode Medvednica" [Sustainable Management of Geomorphological Monument of Nature – Cave Veternica in Nature Park Medvednica]. Speleolog. 71 (71): 72–81. eISSN 2623-7385.
- Bosner, Nela; Novak, Ruđer (2024-03-04). "Zašto su prekinuta speleološka istraživanja Veternice?" [Why were the speleological explorations of Veternica discontinued?]. Speleolog. 71 (71): 82–85. eISSN 2623-7385.
- Marjanac, Tihomir (2024-03-04). "Intervju: Tihomir Marjanac" (Interview). Interviewed by Bombardelli, Mea; Uroić, Milivoj – via Speleolog.

== Tourism ==
- Buzjak, Nenad (2018). "Geotouristic potential of caves – example of Veternica Cave (Medvednica Nature Park, Croatia)". Proceedings of the 12th EuroSpeleo Forum. pp. 38–41. ISBN 978-3-903093-30-0.
- Buzjak, N. (2018). Geotouristic potential of caves – example of Veternica Cave (Medvednica Nature Park, Croatia). ESF Proceedings, 62(2), 36-40.
- Štiberc, Karla (2021) [defended 2021-09-23]. Geoturistički potencijal odabranih podzemnih objekata u okolici Zagreba [Geotouristic potential of selected underground objects in the vicinity of Zagreb] (Thesis) (in Serbo-Croatian). Zagreb: Prirodoslovno-matematički fakultet Sveučilišta u Zagrebu (published 2022-09-06).

== Climatology ==
- Đulić, Beatrica (1962). "O klimi nekih pećina Hrvatske" [On the Climate of Certain Caves of Croatia]. Speleolog. 10 (10) (published 1963-12-01): 13–17. ISSN 0490-4109.
- Buzjak, Nenad (2002). "Dnevni hod temperature, relativne vlage i strujanja zraka u ulaznom dijelu špilje Veternice (Medvednica)" [Daily Temperature Paths, Relative humidity and Airflow in the Entrance Portion of the Veternica Cave (Medvednica)]. Speleo'zin: Glasilo Karlovackih speleologa. pp. 28–33. ISSN 1333-1302.
- Božić, Vlado (2005). "Meteorološka mjerenja u Veternici i Dvogaći" [Meteorological Measurements in Veternica and Dvogaća]. Speleolog. 53 (53) (published 2006-12-03): 67–69. ISSN 0490-4109.
- Bituh, Tomislav; Petrinec, Branko; Čvorišćec, Tea (2024). "Radon concentrations in Veternica cave - Croatia". 10th Conference on Protection against Radon at Home and at Work: Book of Abstracts. Prague: Faculty of Nuclear Sciences and Physical Engineering. p. 47.

== Hydrology ==
- Čepelak, Marijan (1976). "Novija i buduća speleološka istraživanja u Veternici" [Recent and Coming Speleological Explorations in "Veternica"]. Speleolog. 24–25 (24–25) (published 1977-12-01): 1–8. ISSN 0490-4109.
- — (1979). "Objašnjenja uz nacrt špilje Veternice" [Explanations with a Map of Veternica Cave]. Speleolog. 26–27 (26–27) (published 1980-01-02): 33–34. ISSN 0490-4109.
- Božić, Vlado (2004). "Poplava u Veternici koncem 19. stoljeća" [The Flood in Veternica at the End of the 19th Century] (PDF). Hrvatski planinar. No. 9. p. 313. ISSN 0354-0650.
  - The proposal was criticised by geologist Mladen Garašić in the next issue, to which Božić offered a defense.

== Geology ==
- Marjanac, Tihomir (2007). "Špilja Veternica - geološka riznica" [Veternica Cave - Geological Treasury]. Speleolog. 55 (55) (published 2008-08-01): 40–44. ISSN 0490-4109.
- Božičević, Srećko (1974). "Podzemni krški fenomeni planine Medvednice kraj Zagreba" [Subterranean Karst Phenomena of Medvednica Mountain by Zagreb]. Acta Carsologica. 6: 97–109. ISSN 0583-6050.
- Marjana, Tihomir; Panuška, Ljerka (1977). "Rezultati nekih novijih geoloških istraživanja u spilji Veternici" [Results of Some Newer Geological Researches in the Veternica Cave]. Speleolog. 24–25 (24–25): 13–14. ISSN 0490-4109.
- Šikić, Krešimir, ed. (1995). Geološki vodič Medvednice. ISBN 953-96520-0-6.
- Crnjaković, Marta; Lacković, Damir; Stroj, Andrej (2011). "Usporedba sedimentoloških i paleontoloških istraživanja klastičnih sedimenata sa izotopnim istraživanjima siga špilje Veternice u Hrvatskoj" [Comparison of Sedimentological and Paleontological Explorations of Clastic Sediments with Isotopic Explorations of Speleothems of the Veternica Cave in Croatia]. Knjiga sažetaka 2. znanstvenog skupa "Geologija kvartara u Hrvatskoj". pp. 14–15.
- Drvar, Zvonimir (2011-07-08). Krški reljef Medvednice [The Karst Relief of Medvednica] (Thesis). Zagreb: Prirodoslovno-matematički fakultet Sveučilišta u Zagrebu.
- Asmerom, Yemane; Glumac, Bosiljka; Lacković, Damir; Stroj, Andrej (2011-09-15). "Evolution of the Veternica cave (Medvednica Mountain, Croatia) drainage system: insights from the distribution and dating of cave deposits". Geologia Croatica. 64 (3): 213–221. doi:10.4154/GC.2011.18. eISSN 1333-4875.
- Bajo, Petra; Glumac, Bosiljka; Lacković, Damir; Sasowsky, Ira D.; Stroj, Andrej (2024-02-01). "The application of cave morphological and sedimentary deposit investigations to unravel tectonic history and landscape evolution: Insights from Veternica Cave, Medvednica Mountain, Croatia". Geomorphology. 446 109000: 1–11. Bibcode:2024Geomo.44609000S. doi:10.1016/j.geomorph.2023.109000. ISSN 0169-555X.
- Bajo, Petra; Glumac, Bosiljka; Lacković, Damir; Sasowsky, Ira D.; Stroj, Andrej (2024-03-04). "Kako je nastala špilja Veternica?" [How did Veternica Cave form?]. Speleolog. 71 (71): 26–41. eISSN 2623-7385.

== Anthropology ==
=== Paleontology ===
- Malez, Mirko (1955). "Paleontološko istraživanje pećine Veternice u 1955. godini" [Paleontological Exploration of the Veternica Cave in the Year 1955]. Ljetopis Jugoslavenske akademije znanosti i umjetnosti. 62: 280–295. ISSN 0373-9902.
- — (1958). Neki noviji rezultati paleontološkog istraživanja pećine Veternice [Some Newer Results of Palaeontological Research in Veternica Cave]. Palaeontologia Jugoslavica. Vol. 1. ISSN 0552-9352.
- — (1959). "Das Paläolithikum der Veternicahöhle und der Bärenkult" [The Palaeolithic of the Veternica Cave and the Bear Cult]. Quartär – Internationales Jahrbuch zur Erforschung des Eiszeitalters und der Steinzeit (10–11): 171–188. doi:10.7485/qu.1959.10.82090. ISSN 0375-7471.
- — (1963). Kvatarna fauna pećine Veternice u Medvednici [Quaternary Fauna of Veternica Cave in Medvednica]. Palaeontologia Jugoslavica. Vol. 5. ISSN 0552-9352.
- — (1963). Stratigrafska i paleontološka proučavanja diluvijalnog nalazišta u pećini Veternici [Stratigraphic and Paleontological Studies of Diluvial Finds in the Veternica Cave] (Thesis). Zagreb: Prirodoslovno-matematički fakultet Sveučilišta u Zagrebu.
- Brajković, Dejana; Miracle, Preston T. (1992). "Revision of the Ungulate Fauna and Upper Pleistocene Stratigraphy of Veternica Cave (Zagreb, Croatia)". Geologia Croatica. 45 (1): 1–14. doi:10.4154/GC.1992.01 (inactive 12 July 2025). ISSN 1330-030X.
- Brajković, Dejana; Mauch Lenardić, Jadranka; Miracle, Preston T. (2010). "Last Glacial Climates, "Refugia", and Faunal Change in Southeastern Europe: Mammalian Assemblages from Veternica, Velika pećina, and Vindija Caves (Croatia)". Quaternary International. 212 (2) (published 2009-06-13): 137–148. Bibcode:2010QuInt.212..137M. doi:10.1016/j.quaint.2009.06.003. eISSN 1873-4553.
- Brajković, Dejana; Miracle, Preston T. (2010-06-02). "The palaeoecological significance of the Pleistocene mammalian fauna from Veternica Cave, Croatia. Revision of the lagomorpha, canidae, mustelidae and felidae". Geologia Croatica. 63 (2): 207–224. eISSN 1333-4875.
- Banda, Marko; Karavanić, Ivor (2019-12-13). "Mustjerska industrija špilje Veternice" [The Mousterian industry of Veternica cave]. Prilozi Instituta Za Arheologiju U Zagrebu. 36: 5–40. doi:10.33254/piaz.36.1. eISSN 1848-6371.
- Banda, Marko (2020-09-29) [defended 2019-03-13]. Revizija srednjopaleolitičkih izrađevina iz istraživanja Mirka Maleza u špilji Veternici [Revision of the Middle Paleolithic Artefacts from the Explorations by Mirko Malez in the Veternica Cave] (Thesis). Zagreb: Filozofski fakultet Sveučilišta u Zagrebu.
- Banda, Marko; Karavanić, Ivor; Radović, Siniša (2020). "The Use of Bone in Stone Tool Technology: Retouchers from Veternica and Vindija (Croatia)". Litikum – Journal of the Lithic Research Roundtable. 8: 13–34. eISSN 2064-3640.
- Banda, Marko (2023-09-13). "Špilja Veternica – srednjopaleolitičko nalazište na Medvednici" [Vetrnica Cave – Middle Paleolithic Site on Medvednica]. Subterranea Croatica. 34 (1): 54–66. eISSN 2623-6648.
- Uredništvo (2024-03-04). "90 godina istraživanja špilje Veternice" [90 Years of Exploring the Veternica Cave]. Speleolog. 71 (71): 6–7. eISSN 2623-7385.
- Banda, Marko (2024-03-04). "Arheologija špilje Veternice" [The Archaeology of Veternica Cave]. Speleolog. 71 (71): 42–57. eISSN 2623-7385.
- Janković, Ivor; Vidas, Lia; Novak, Mario; Vukosavljević, Nikola; Radović, Siniša; Raguž, Krešimir; Ahern, James (2024-09-19). "Redating the Veternica Prehistoric humans". Journal of the Archaeological Museum in Zagreb. 57 (1): 23–28. doi:10.52064/vamz.57.1.2. eISSN 1849-1561.

=== Pedagogy ===
- Šabalj, Karla (2024-10-28) [defended 2024-07-11]. Prirodne znamenitosti parka prirode Medvednica i njihova iskoristivost u izvanučioničkoj nastavi prirode i društva [Land marks of Medvednica natural park and its usefulness in outdoor teaching] (Thesis) (in Croatian). Zagreb: Učiteljski fakultet Sveučilišta u Zagrebu.
- Pavković, Petra (2024-11-29) [defended 2024-09-19]. Park prirode Medvednica kao nadahnuće za rad s djecom predškolske dobi [Nature Park Medvednica As An Inspiration For Working With Preschool Children] (Thesis) (in Croatian). Zagreb: Učiteljski fakultet Sveučilišta u Zagrebu.
- Kunić Macenić, Ivana (2024-09-20). Špilje u Hrvatskoj kao mjesta izvođenja nastave u primarnom obrazovanju [Caves in Croatia as Places of Conducting Classes in Primary Education] (Thesis) (in Croatian). Zagreb: Učiteljski fakultet Sveučilišta u Zagrebu.

== Zoology ==
- Đulić, Beatrica (1953). "Šišmiši pećina zagrebačke okolice" [Bats of the Caves of the Zagreb Area]. Speleolog. 1 (1) (published 1954-01-20): 24–29. ISSN 0490-4109.
- Malez, Mirko (1963). Kvatarna fauna pećine Veternice u Medvednici [Quaternary Fauna of Veternica Cave in Medvednica]. Palaeontologia Jugoslavica. Vol. 5. ISSN 0552-9352.
- Brajković, Dejana; Miracle, Preston T. (1992). "Revision of the Ungulate Fauna and Upper Pleistocene Stratigraphy of Veternica Cave (Zagreb, Croatia)". Geologia Croatica. 45 (1): 1–14. doi:10.4154/GC.1992.01 (inactive 12 July 2025). ISSN 1330-030X.
- Brajković, Dejana; Mauch Lenardić, Jadranka; Miracle, Preston T. (2010). "Last Glacial Climates, "Refugia", and Faunal Change in Southeastern Europe: Mammalian Assemblages from Veternica, Velika pećina, and Vindija Caves (Croatia)". Quaternary International. 212 (2) (published 2009-06-13): 137–148. Bibcode:2010QuInt.212..137M. doi:10.1016/j.quaint.2009.06.003. eISSN 1873-4553.
- Brajković, Dejana; Miracle, Preston T. (2010-06-02). "The palaeoecological significance of the Pleistocene mammalian fauna from Veternica Cave, Croatia. Revision of the lagomorpha, canidae, mustelidae and felidae". Geologia Croatica. 63 (2): 207–224. eISSN 1333-4875.
- Kajtezović, Nalja; Rubinić, Josip (2013). "Water and research of underground habitats in protected areas – Example of protozoa research in Veternica Cave (Medvednica Nature Park, Croatia)". Water in Sensitive and Protected Areas. pp. 150–153. ISBN 978-953-96071-3-3.
- Baković, Nalja (2016-06-01). "Širenje lampenflore u špilji Veternici (Park prirode Medvednica) u razdoblju od 2012. do 2014. godine" [The Appearance of Lampenflora in Veternica Cave (Medvednica Nature Park) Through a Period from 2012 to 2014]. Subterranea Croatica. 14 (1): 26–30. eISSN 2623-6648.
- Baković, Nalja; Matoničkin Kepčija, Renata; Siemensma, Ferry J. (2022-01-25). "Transitional and small aquatic cave habitats diversification based on protist assemblages in the Veternica cave (Medvednica Mt., Croatia)". Subterranean Biology. 42: 43–60. doi:10.3897/subtbiol.42.78037. eISSN 1314-2615.
- Baković, Nalja; Baković, Robert; Ozimec, Roman; Siemensma, Ferry (2024-03-04). "Protisti (Protista) u špilji Veternici" [Protists (Protista) in the Veternica Cave]. Speleolog. 71 (71): 58–65. eISSN 2623-7385.
- Bedek, Jana (2024-03-04). "Beskralješnjaci Veternice" [Invertebrates of the Veternica cave]. Speleolog. 71 (71): 66–71. eISSN 2623-7385.
- Kovačić, Denis; Kostelić, Andrea; Ban Ćurić, Tajana; Belović Kelemen, Martina; Popijač, Marina (2024). "Klimatske promjene kao potencijalni uzrok smanjivanja brojnosti hibernacijske kolonije šišmiša vrste mali potkovnjak u špilji Veternici" [Climate Change as a Potential Cause of the Population Decline in the Hibernating Colony of the Lesser Horseshoe Bat Species in Veternica Cave]. Knjiga sažetaka Zeleni dodir Medvednice – 2. znanstveno – stručni skup s međunarodnim sudjelovanjem (in Croatian). Zagreb: Javna ustanova Park prirode Medvednice. pp. 46–47.
