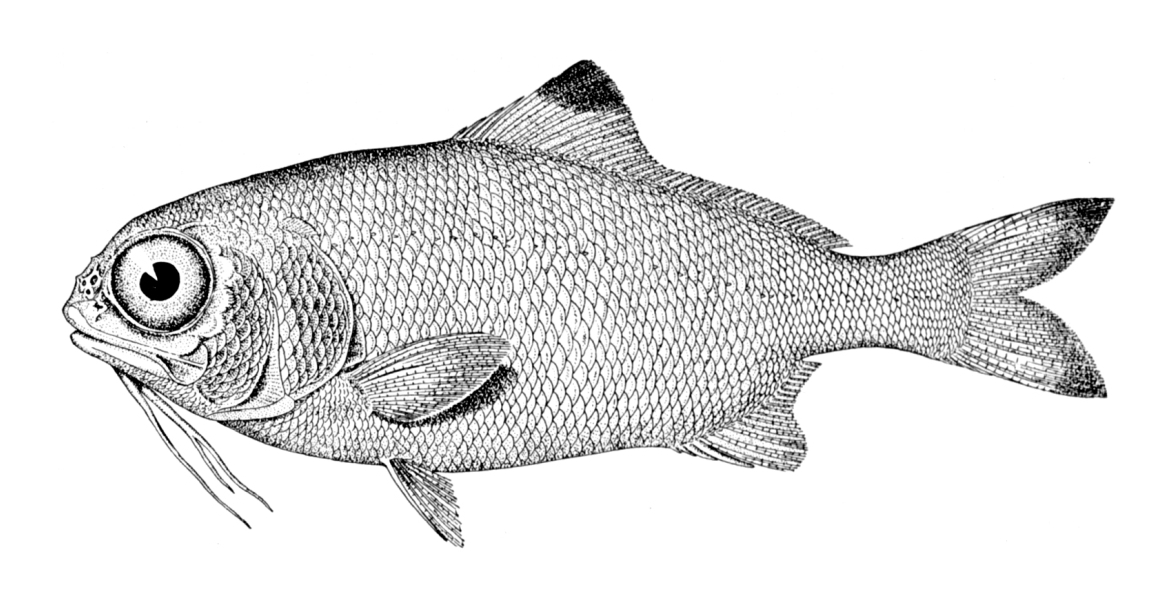
- Stout beardfish (P. nobilis)

Scientific classification
- Kingdom: Animalia
- Phylum: Chordata
- Class: Actinopterygii
- Order: Polymixiiformes
- Family: Polymixiidae
- Genus: Polymixia; R. T. Lowe, 1838

Type species
- Polymixia nobilis R. T. Lowe, 1838

= Polymixia =

Polymixia Temporal range: Early Paleocene–present Possible Late Cretaceous occurrence

Genus of fishes

Polymixia is the only extant genus of the order Polymixiiformes and family Polymixiidae. It contains 12 species, all of which live in deepwater marine environments. They are found in tropical and subtropical waters of the Atlantic, Indian and western Pacific Oceans. They are bottom-dwelling fish, found down to about 800 m (2,600 ft). Most are relatively small fish, although one species is over 40 cm (16 in) in length. They can be considered "living fossils" due to being the only surviving members of the once-diverse order Polymixiiformes.

== Classification ==
There are currently 12 recognized species in this genus:

- Polymixia berndti C. H. Gilbert, 1905 (Pacific beardfish)
- Polymixia busakhini Kotlyar, 1993 (Busakhin's beardfish)
- Polymixia carmenae Caixeta, Oliveira & de Melo, 2024 (Brazilian beardfish)
- Polymixia fusca Kotthaus, 1970
- Polymixia hollisterae Grande & Wilson, 2021 (Bermuda beardfish)
- Polymixia japonica Günther, 1877 (Silver eye)
- Polymixia longispina S. M. Deng, G. Q. Xiong & H. X. Zhan, 1983
- Polymixia lowei Günther, 1859 (Beardfish)
- Polymixia melanostoma Fan, Su, Lin, Chang & Lin 2024
- Polymixia nobilis R. T. Lowe, 1838 (Stout beardfish)
- Polymixia salagomeziensis Kotlyar, 1991
- Polymixia sazonovi Kotlyar, 1992
- Polymixia yuri Kotlyar, 1982

The extinct species Polymixia polita Schwarzhans, 2012 is known from fossil otoliths from the early and late Paleocene of Germany and Austria. Another otolith-based taxon that may possibly belong to this genus, Polymixia? harderi (Schwarzhans, 2003) is known from the late Maastrichtian and early Paleocene of Denmark, in addition to a potential earlier record from the Campanian of North Carolina, USA; this may suggest Late Cretaceous origins for the genus.
