= Omosomopsis =

Scientific classification
- Domain: Eukaryota
- Kingdom: Animalia
- Phylum: Chordata
- Class: Actinopterygii
- Clade: Acanthomorpha
- Genus: †Omosomopsis; Gaudant, 1978

Extinct genus of fishes

Omosomopsis is a genus of prehistoric ray-finned fish from the Late Cretaceous.

It was described by Gaudant in 1978.
