= James William Davis =

British naturalist

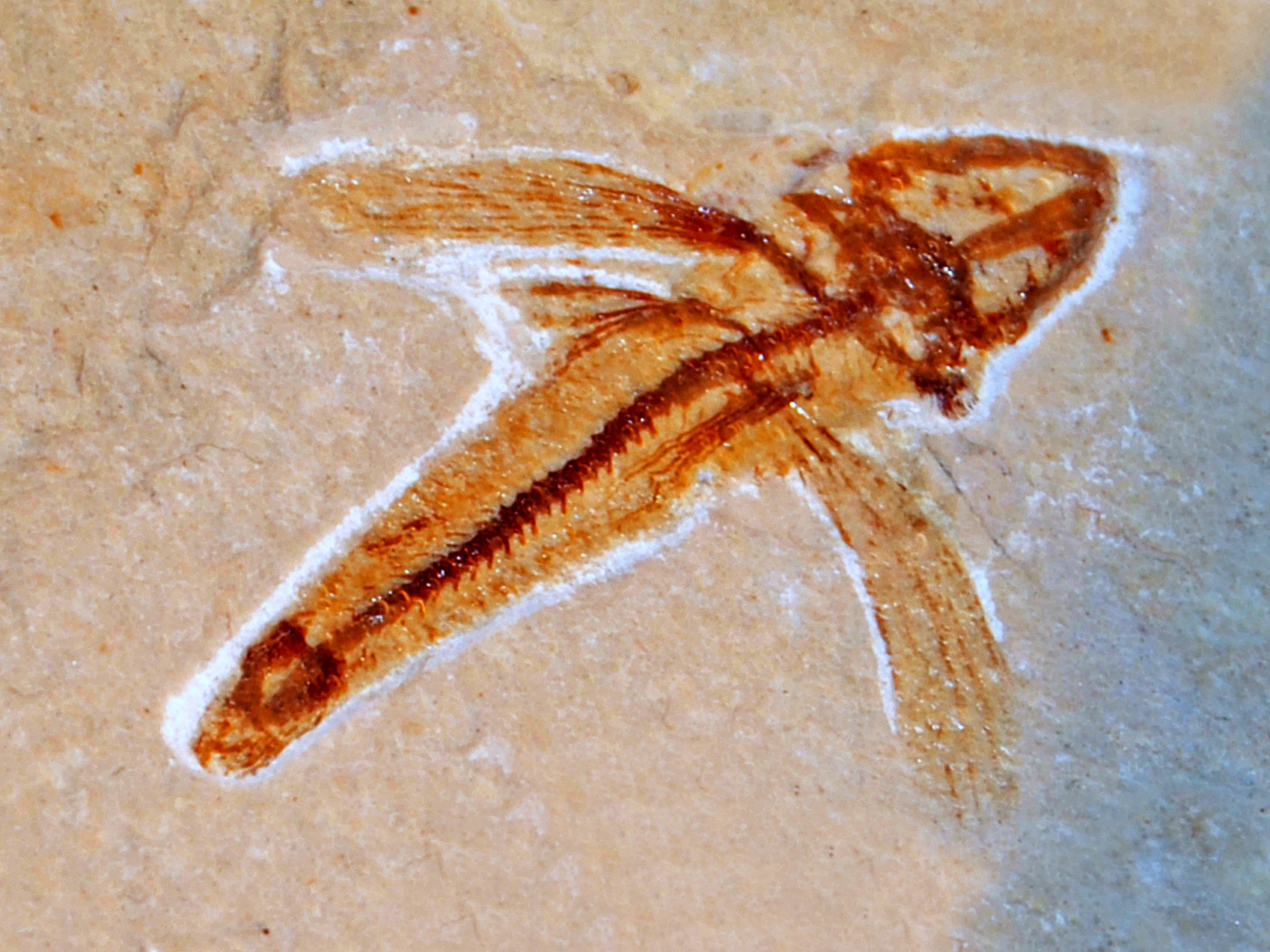
Fossil of Exocoetoides minor. Cenomanian of Haqel, Lebanon a species originally described by James William Davis in 1887

James William Davis (1846, Leeds-1893) was a British naturalist who specialised in fossil fish. He lived at Chevinedge, Halifax in Yorkshire. James William Davis was a leading member of the Yorkshire Naturalists' Union and a Fellow of the Geological Society of London.

== Works ==
partial list

- Davis, J.W. (1879) Description of a new species of fossil fish spine, Ctenacanthus minor, from the Lower Coal-Measures of Yorkshire. Geological Magazine, decade 2, 6: 531–532
- Davis, J.W. (1880) On the fish fauna of the Yorkshire Coal Field. Proceedings of the Geologists' Association, 6 (8): 359–370
- Davis, J. W. (1880) On a new species of Gyracanthus, a fossil fish from the Coal-Measures. Annals and Magazine of Natural History 6:372-373. Online here
- Davis, J.W. (1880) On the genus Pleuracanthus, Agass., including Orthacanthus, Agass., and Gold., Diplodus, Agass., and Xenacanthus, Beyr. Quarterly Journal of the Geological Society of London, 36: 321–336 Online here
- Davis, J.W. (1880) On the fish-remains found in the Cannel Coal in the Middle Coal-Measures of the West Riding of Yorkshire, with the description of some new species. Quarterly Journal of the Geological Society of London, 36: 56–67 online here
- Davis, J.W. (1880) On the fish fauna of the Yorkshire Coal Field. Proceedings of the Geologists' Association, 6 (8): 359–370
- Davis, J.W. (1881) On the genera Ctenoptychius, Agassiz; Ctenopetalus, Agassiz; and Harpacodus, Agassiz. Annals and Magazine of Natural History, (Series 5), 8: 424–427
- Davis, J.W. (1881) Notes on the fish-remains of the bone-bed at Aust, near Bristol; with the description of some new genera and species. Quarterly Journal of the Geological Society of London, 37: 414–426 online here
- Davis, J.W. (1882) On Diodontopsodus, Davis, a new genus of fossil fishes from the Mountain Limestone, at Richmond, in Yorkshire. Abstract. Report of the British Association for the Advancement of Science, 51: 646
- Davis, J.W. (1883) On the fossil fishes of the Carboniferous Limestone Series of Great Britain. Scientific Transactions of the Royal Dublin Society, Series 2, 1: 327–548
- Davis, J.W. (1884) On some remains of fossil fishes from the Yoredale Series at Leyburn in Wensleydale. Quarterly Journal of the Geological Society of London, 40: 614–635 online here
- Davis, J.W. (1887) The fossil fishes of the chalk of Mount Lebanon, in Syria. Scientific Transactions of the Royal Dublin Society, 2 (3): 457–636, pl. 14–38. Online here Communicated by William Cole, 3rd Earl of Enniskillen.
- Davis, J.W. (1887) Note on a fossil species of Chlamydoselachus. Proceedings of the Zoological Society of London, 1887: 542–544
- Davis, J.W. (1888) Note on a species of Scymnus from the upper Tertiary formation of New Zealand. Geological Magazine, decade 3, 5: 315–316
- Davis, J.W. (1888) On fossil fish-remains from the Tertiary and Cretaceo-Tertiary formations of New-Zealand. Scientific Transactions of the Royal Dublin Society, 4 (2): 1–48, 7 pl.
- Davis, J.W. (1890) On the fossil fish of the Cretaceous formations of Scandinavia. Scientific Transactions of the Royal Dublin Society, 2 (4): 363–434, pl. 38 Online here
- Davis, J.W. (1892) On the fossil fish-remains of the coal measures of the British Islands. Part I. Pleuracanthidae Scientific Transactions of the Royal Dublin Society, 2 (4): 703–748 Online here
- Davis, J.W.(1899) Fossil Fish-remains from Carboniferous Shales at Cultra, Co. Down, Ireland Proceedings of the Yorkshire Geological and Polytechnic Society, 11, 332-334

== Taxa described by Davis ==
Taxa described by Davis include

- Cheirothrix lewisii
- Rhinobatos intermedius Davis 1887
- Rhinobatos latus Davis 1887
- Rhinobatos tenuirostris Davis 1887
- Anodontacanthus, Davis, 1881
- Ctenacanthus minor Davis, 1879
- Gyracanthus denticulatus Davis, 1880
- Strepsodus brockbanki Davis, 1891.
- Diodontopsodus Davis, 1882
- Exocoetoides Davis, 1887
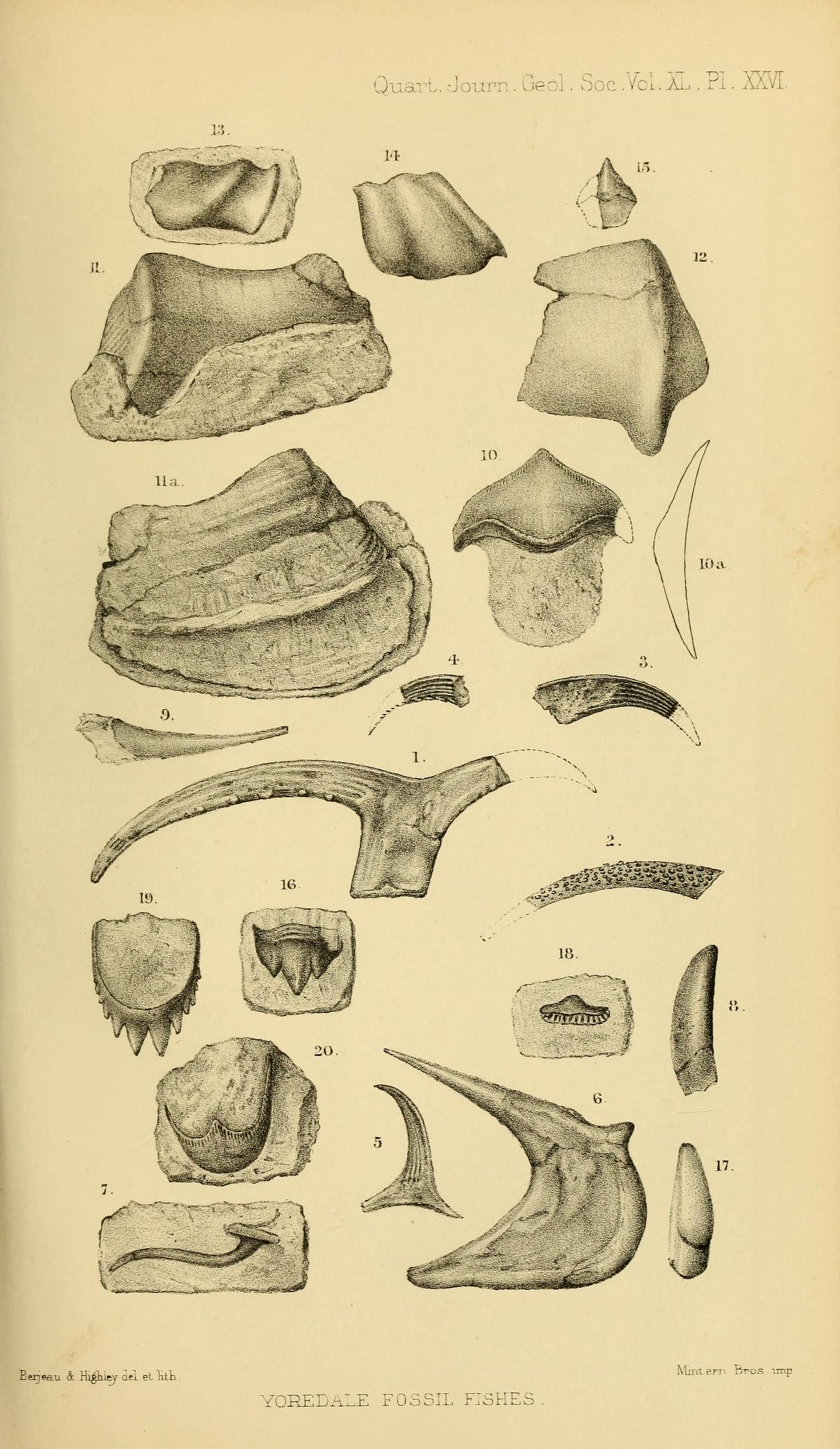
Yoredale Fossil Fishes Plate Davis 1884

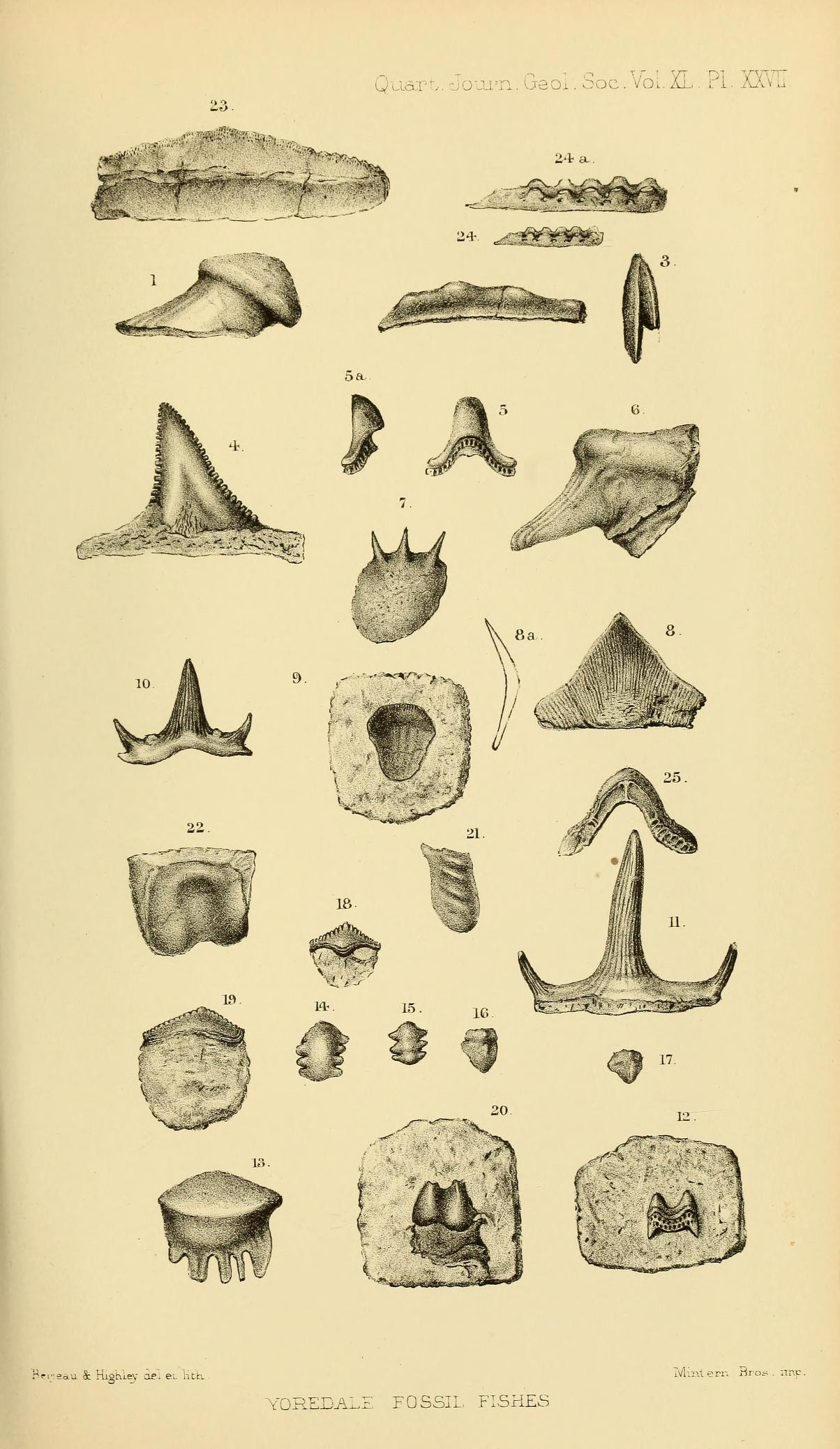
Yoredale Fossil Fishes Plate Davis 1884

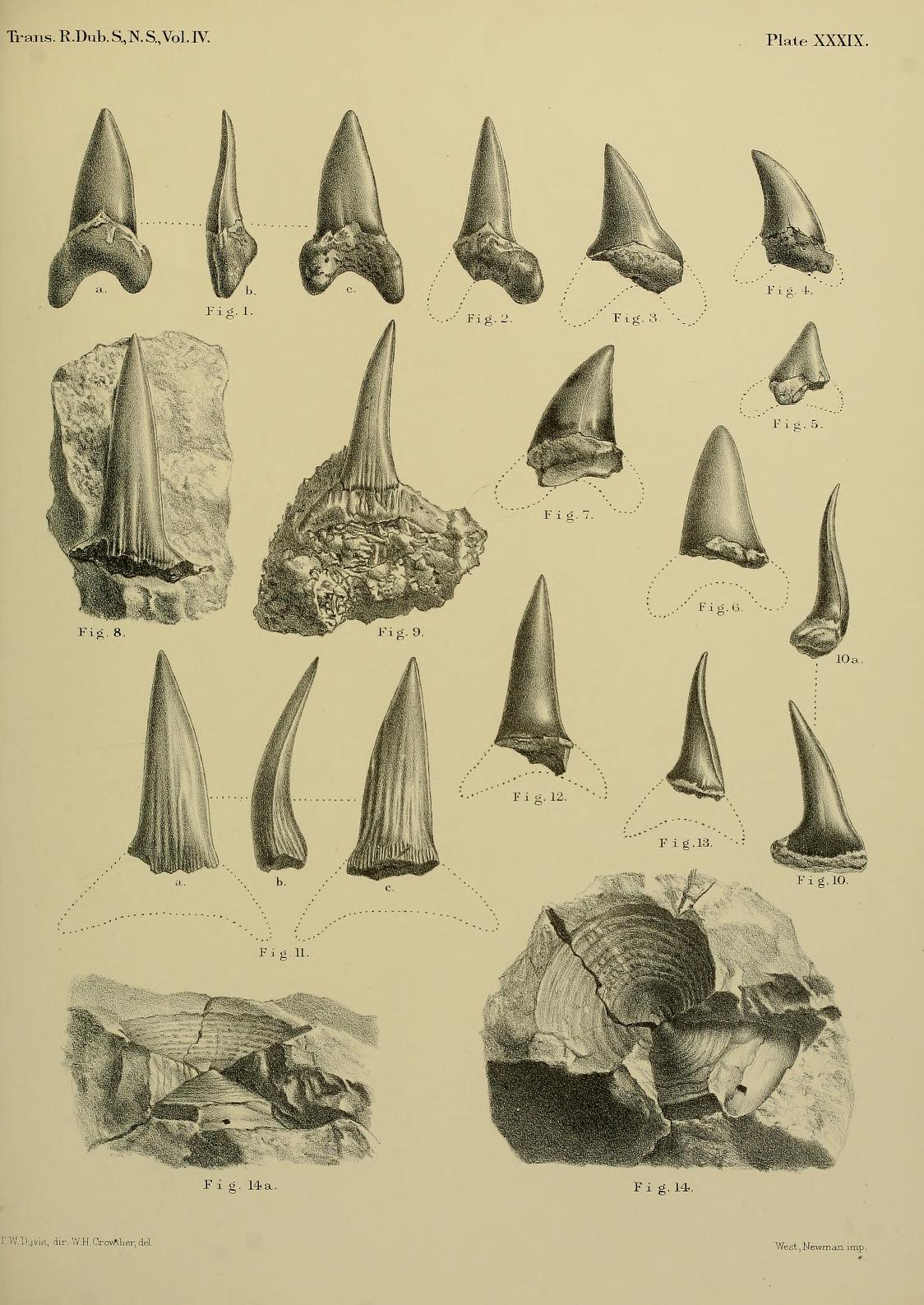
Cretaceous Fish of Scandinavia Davis 1884

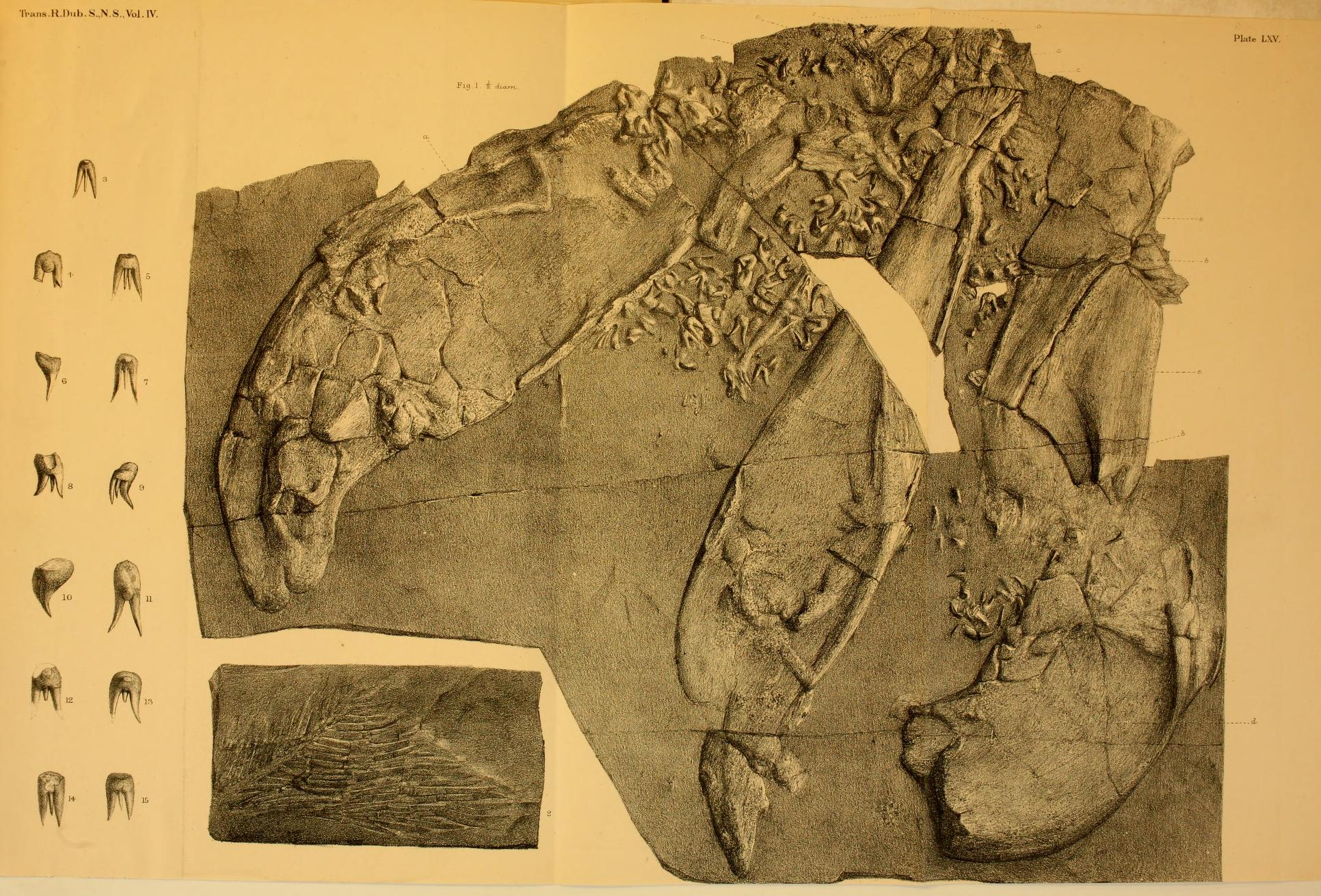
Fossil Fishes of the Coal Measures of theBritish Islands Davis 1892

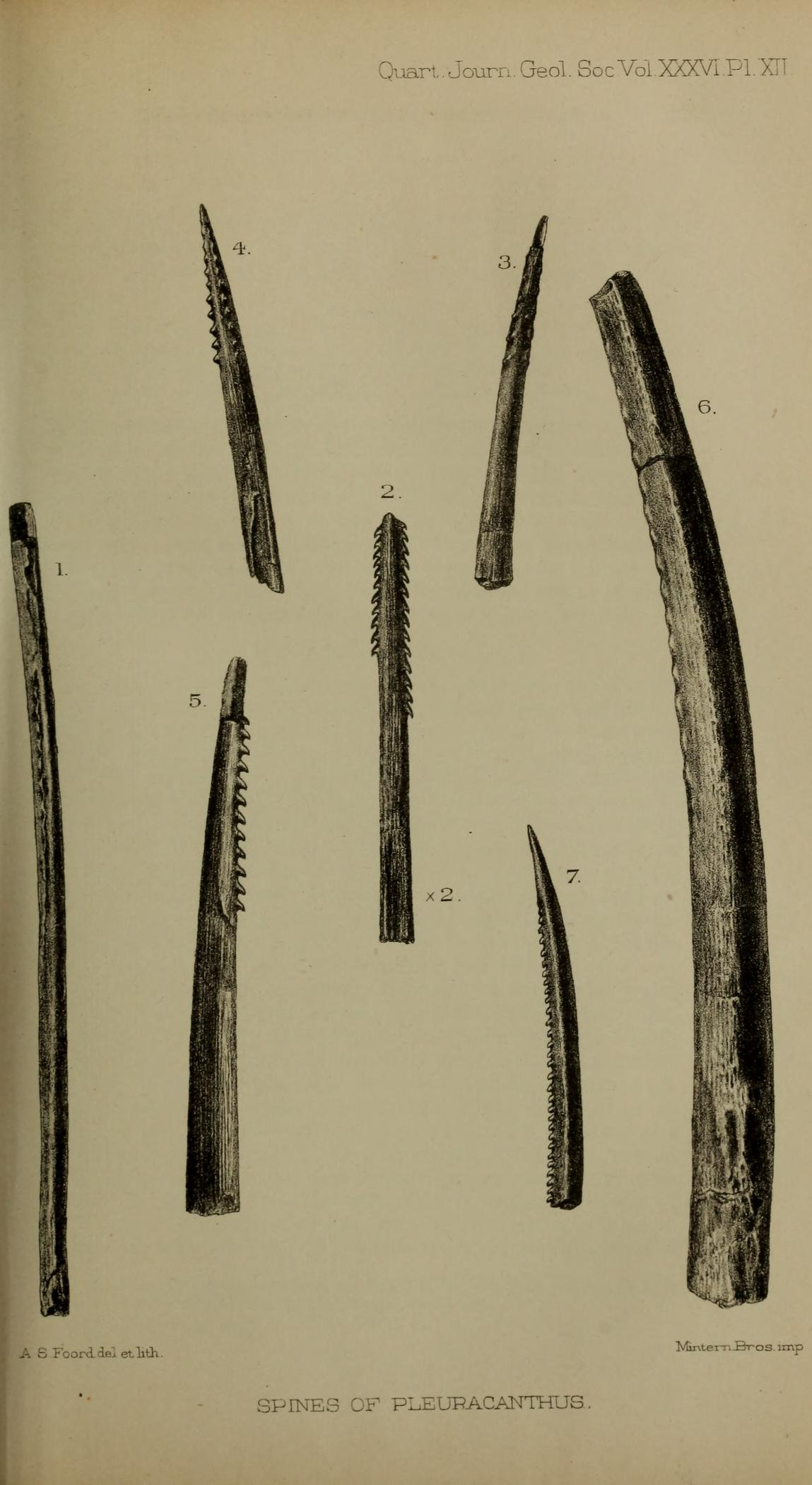
Spines of Peuracanthus
