= Lac des Bois (Northwest Territories) =

Lake in the Northwest Territories, Canada

- Location within Northwest Territories

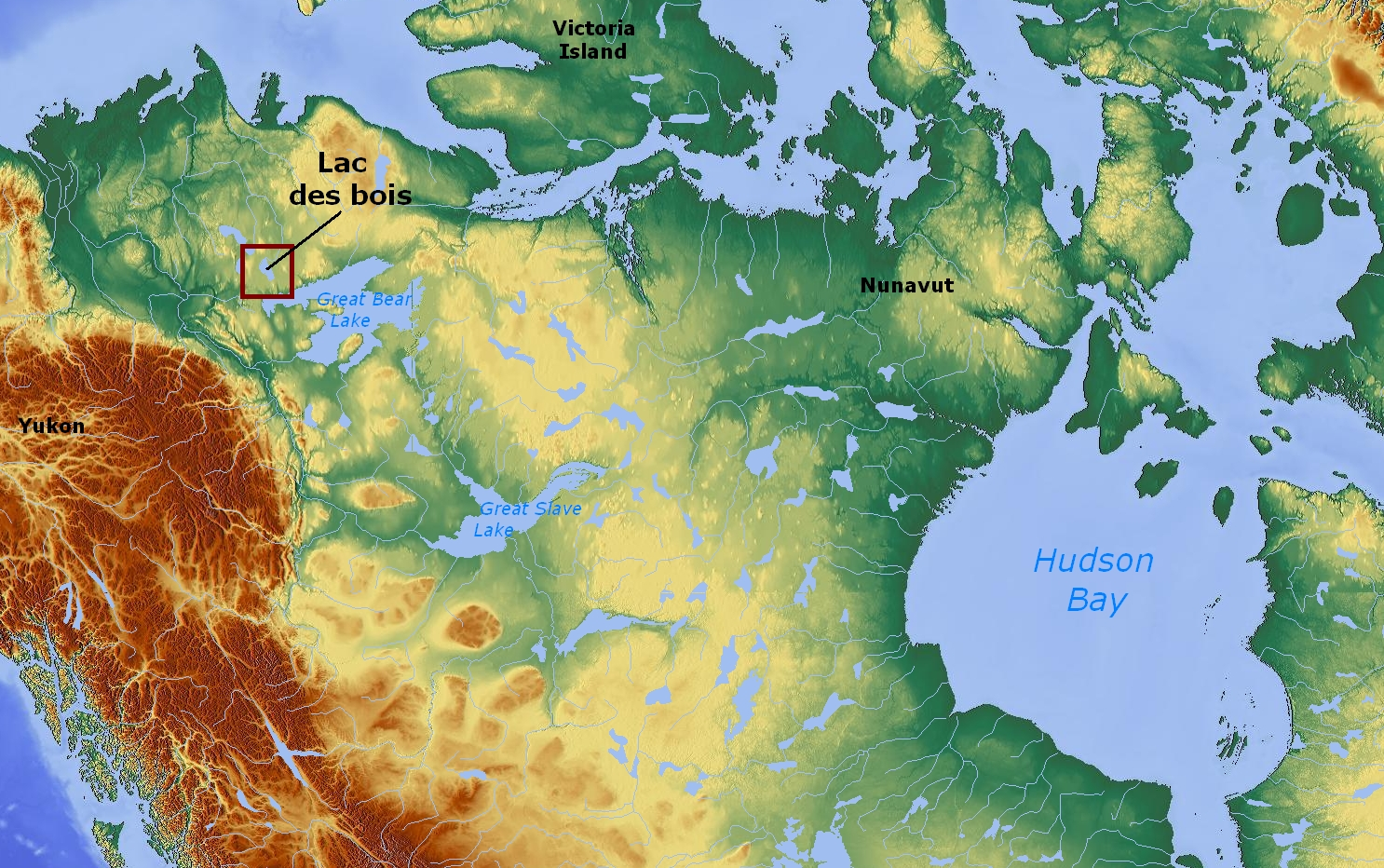
- Location: Northwest Territories
- Coordinates: 66°49′N 125°15′W
- Basin countries: Canada
- Surface area: 469 km^{2} (181 sq mi)
- Surface elevation: 297 m (974 ft)

This is for the article about the Northwest Territories Lake. For the article about the lake in Manitoba with the same French name, see Lake of the Woods.

Lac des Bois is a lake in the Northwest Territories, Canada.

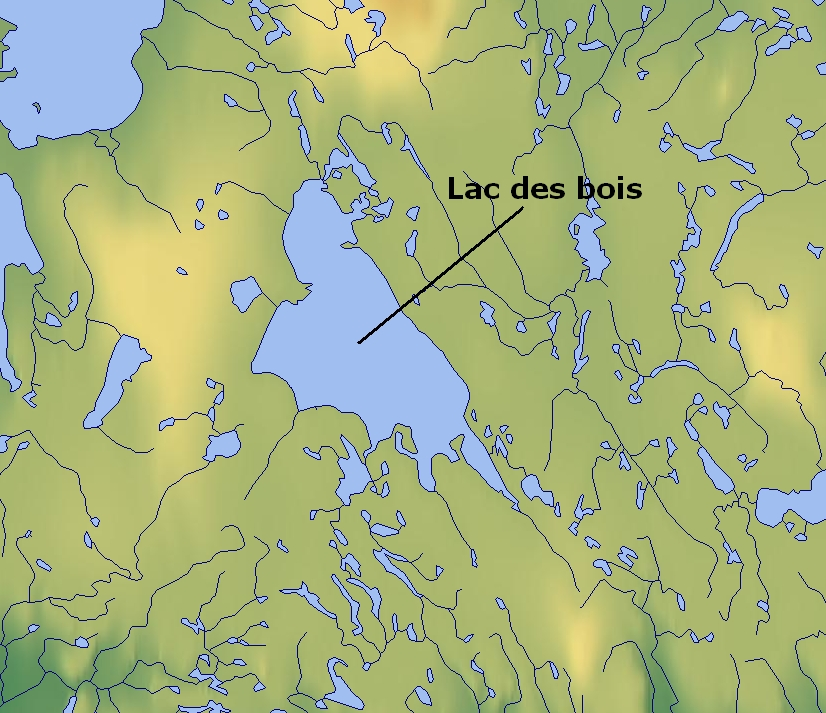
Map of the sea

== See also ==
- List of lakes in the Northwest Territories
