= Telepholis =

Telepholis Temporal range: Cenomanian - Campanian

Scientific classification
- Domain: Eukaryota
- Kingdom: Animalia
- Phylum: Chordata
- Class: Actinopterygii
- Genus: †Telepholis von der Marck, 1868

Telepholis is an extinct genus of prehistoric bony fish that lived from the Cenomanian to Campanian.

== Species ==
Species in the genus Telepholis as reported in Dietze (2009):

- Telepholis acrocephalus, von der Marck and Schlüter, 1868 (Type species)
- Telepholis tenuis, Davis 1887

== Location/Distribution ==
Type Locality: Sendenhorst (Westphalia, Germany)

== Holotype and known collections specimens ==
The Holotype is specimen "GIM-8434". As reported in Dietze's study : "Complete specimen with poorly preserved head, standard length ca. 112 mm"

Standard length of 3 specimens (GIM-8425, GIM-8434 and IPB-1631) : 112-160 mm (11.2 - 11.6 cm).

== See also ==
- Prehistoric fish
- List of prehistoric bony fish
