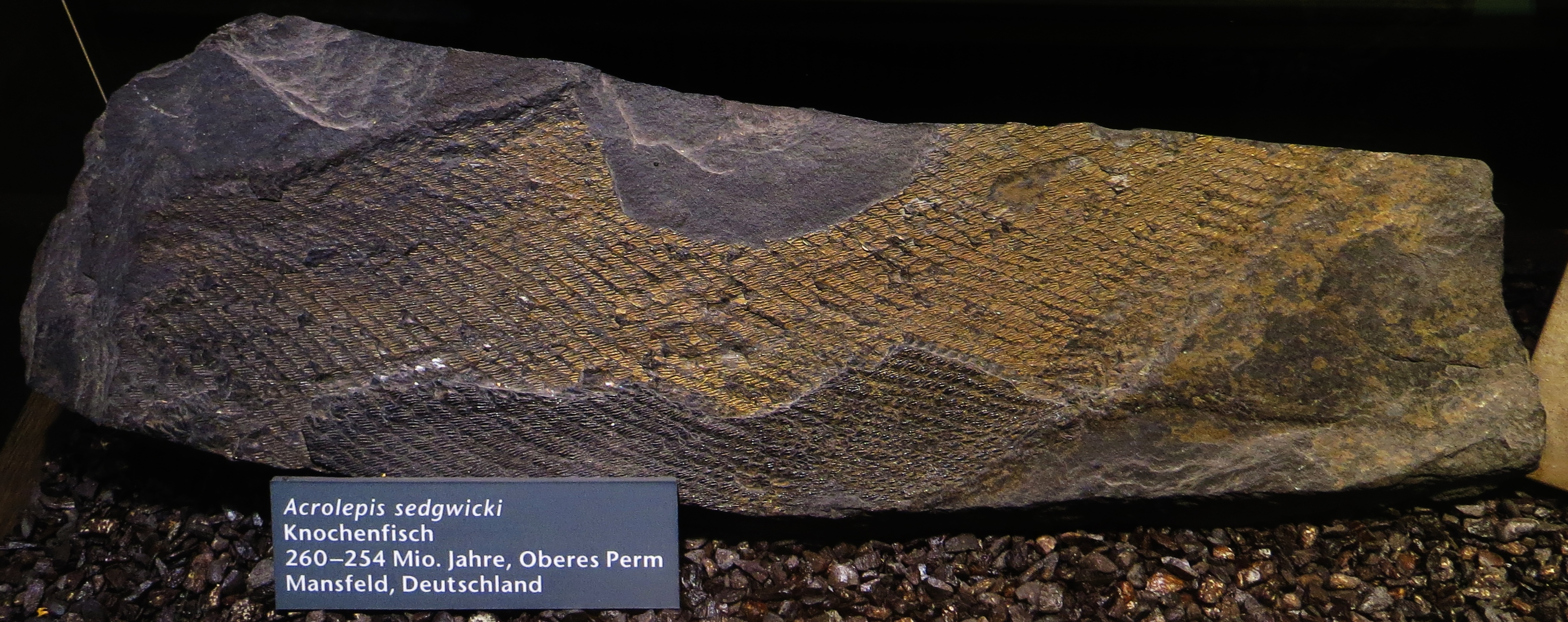
- Fossil of Acrolepis sedgwicki
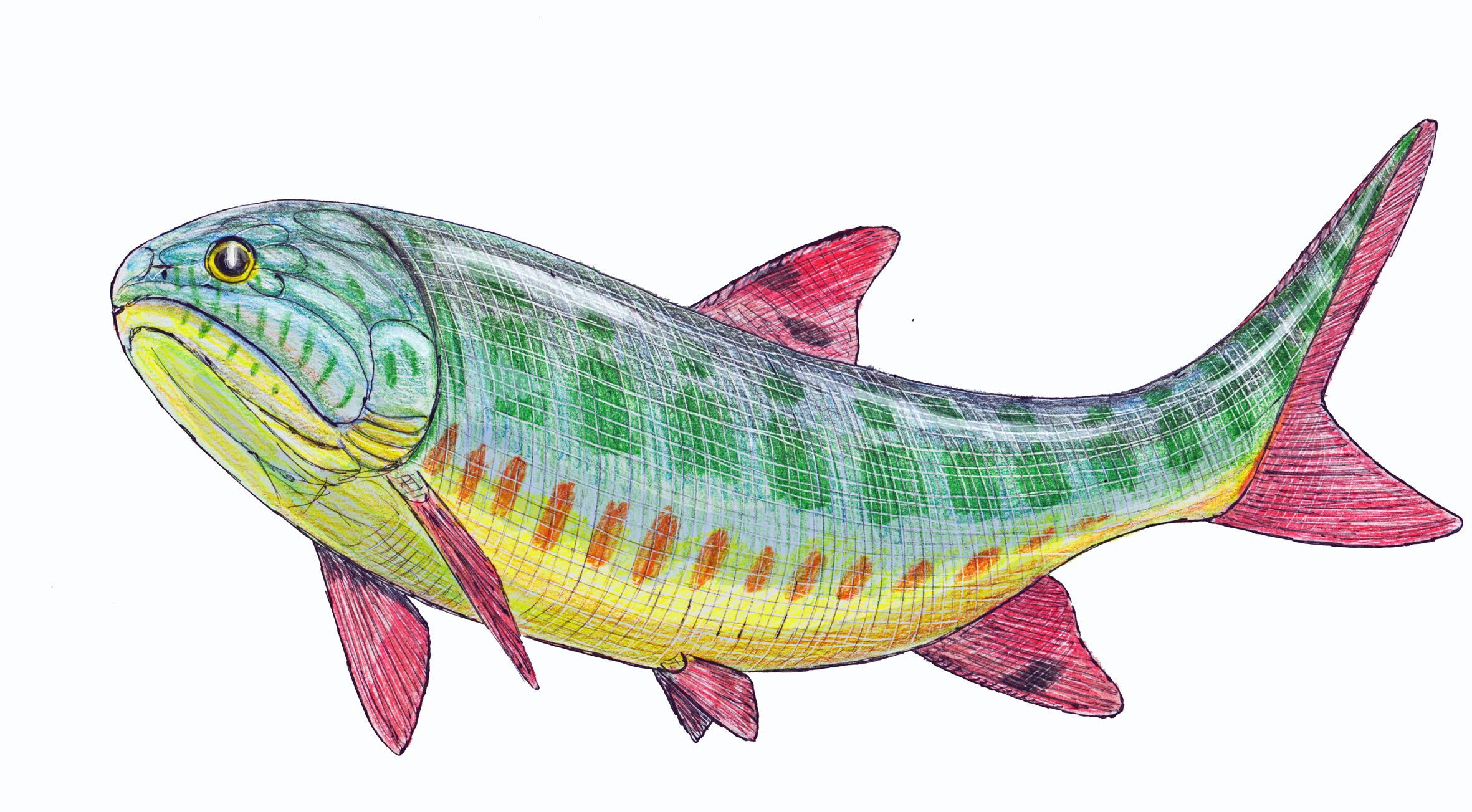
- Restoration of A. gigas

Scientific classification
- Kingdom: Animalia
- Phylum: Chordata
- Class: Actinopterygii
- Order: †Elonichthyiformes
- Family: †Acrolepididae
- Genus: †Acrolepis; Agassiz, 1833

Type species
- †Acrolepis sedgwicki Agassiz, 1833

Other species
- See text

= Acrolepis =

Acrolepis Temporal range: mid-Mississippian to Early Triassic Possible Famennian & Tournaisian records

Extinct genus of fishes

Acrolepis (Ancient Greek for "tip scale") is an extinct genus of prehistoric marine & freshwater bony fish that lived from the Visean stage of the Carboniferous to the early Triassic epoch. It is a large piscivorous predatory fish in the acrolepid family, which occupied an apex predator niche in its locale. A. gigas was estimated to have grown up to 1.25 metres (4.1 ft) in length.

The earliest definitive species are known from the mid-Mississippian stage of Europe, and the last surviving species of Acrolepis are known from the Early Triassic of Tasmania. Potentially earlier, but more dubious records are known from the late Devonian (Famennian) of Russia and the early Carboniferous (Tournaisian) of Canada. This genus was most diverse and speciose during the Permian.

A close relationship between the mostly Palaeozoic Acrolepidae and the Mesozoic Ptycholepiformes was proposed, but support from phylogenetic analyses is scarce. More recent studies place it in the order Elonichthyiformes.

== Diet ==
Acrolepis possibly used its sharp, pointed teeth to catch smaller fishes (such as other "palaeoniscoid" fish).

== Fossil record ==
The type species is Acrolepis sedgwicki from the late Permian Marl Slate of England and the coeval Kupferschiefer of Germany. It is named after British geologist Adam Sedgwick. Other species are known from Carboniferous and Permian rocks in the Czech Republic and Triassic layers of Tasmania.

Specimens in possession of Tyne & Wear Archives and Museums comprise a fossilized jawbone from the Marl Slate of Durham Province.

== Taxonomy ==
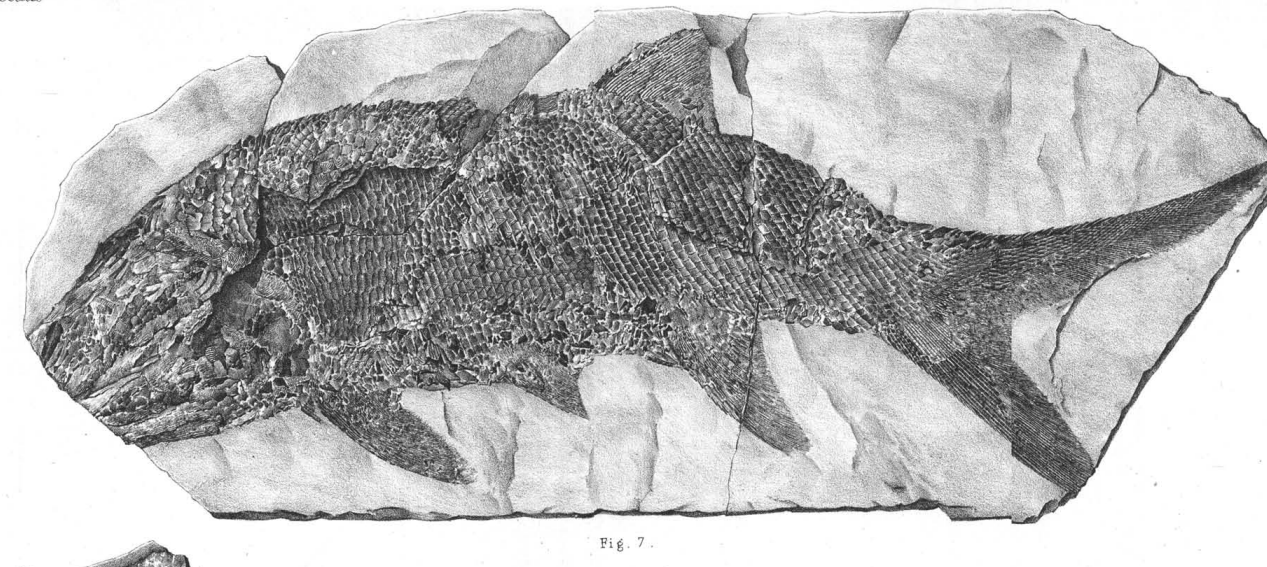
Specimen of A. ortholepis

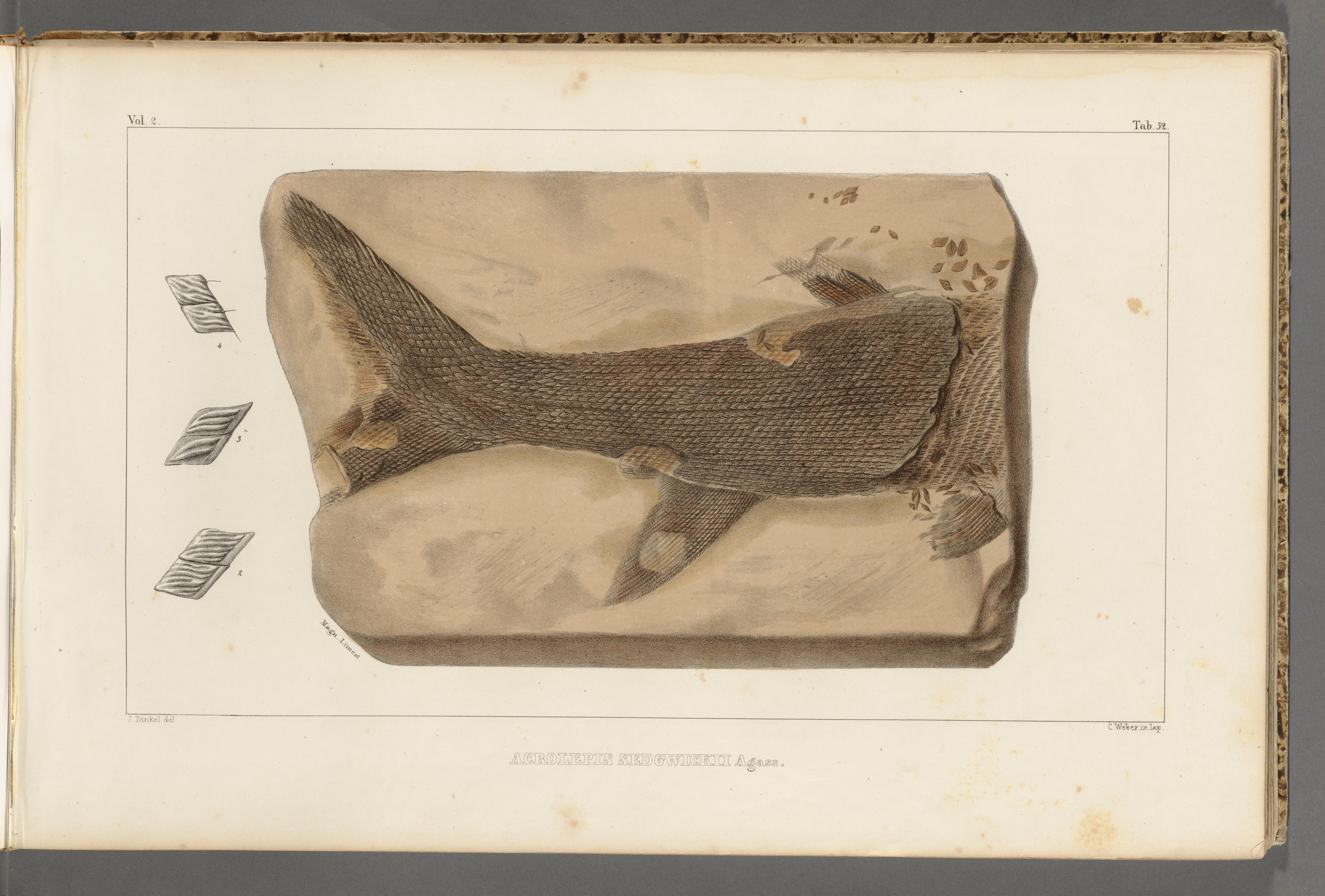
Type specimen of A. sedgwicki

The following species are known:

- †A. barbarus Minikh, 2006 - Middle Permian (Wordian) of Arkhangelsk, Russia
- †A. chuvashovi Yankevich, 2001 - Early Permian (Artinskian) of Perm, Russia (Urminskaya Formation)
- †A. frequens Yankevich & Minikh, 1998 - Middle Permian (Kungurian) of Perm, Russia (Intinsky Formation)
- †A. gigas Frič, 1877 - Late Pennsylvanian (Moscovian to Gzhelian) of the Czech Republic (Slaný & Syřenov Formations)
- †A. hamiltoni Johnston & Morton, 1890 - Early Triassic (Induan) of Tasmania, Australia (Knocklofty Formation)
- †A. hopkinsi McCoy, 1848 - mid-late Mississippian (Visean to Serpukhovian) of England (Millstone Grit & Pendleside Limestone), Serpukhovian of Belgium (Chokier Formation)
- †?A. hortonensis Dawson, 1868 - early Mississippian (Tournaisian) of New Brunswick (Albert Formation) & Nova Scotia (Horton Bluff Formation), Canada
- †A. hussakofi Hay, 1929 - Kungurian of South Dakota, US (Minnekahta Formation)
- †A. languescens Yankevich & Minikh, 1998 - Kungurian of Perm, Russia (Intinsky Formation)
- †A. macroderma Eichwald, 1860 - Middle Permian (Roadian) of Tatarstan (Baitugan Formation) & Wordian of Chuvashia (Isheevo Formation), Russia
- †A. minichi Yankevich, 2001 - Kungurian of Perm, Russia (Intinsky Formation)
- †A. ortholepis Traquair, 1884 - Visean of Scotland (Glencartholm Volcanic Beds)
- †?A. reticulata Eichwald, 1860 - Late Devonian (Famennian) of Oryol, Russia (Dankov-Lebedyan Beds Formation) (potentially Glyptopomus)
- †A. semigranulosa Traquair, 1890 - Visean of Scotland (West Lothian Oil Shale Formation)
- †A. sedgwicki Agassiz, 1833 (type species) - Kungurian of Saratov, Russia (Baytugan Formation), Roadian of Udmurtia, Russia (Intinsky Formation), Late Permian (Wuchiapingian) of England (Marl Slate/Raisby Formation) & Germany (Kupferschiefer)
- †A. tasmanicus Johnston & Morton, 1891 - Induan of Tasmania, Australia (Knocklofty Formation)
- †A. wilsoni Traquair, 1888 - Visean of England (Yoredale Group)

== Synonyms ==
Several species have been referred to the genus Acrolepis. The following species were subsequently reascribed to other genera:

- †Acrolepis arctica Woodward, 1912 → †Boreosomus acticus (Woodward, 1912)
- †Acrolepis digitata Woodward, 1891 → †Namaichthys digitata (Woodward, 1891)
- †Acrolepis laetus Lambe, 1916 → †Pteronisculus? laetus (Lambe, 1916)

== In culture ==
The flag and coat of arms of the village and municipality of Žilov, Plzeň-North District in the Plzeň Region of the Czech Republic, feature a restoration of Acrolepis gigas in the center of the black-silver-red divided fabric or shield, respectively.

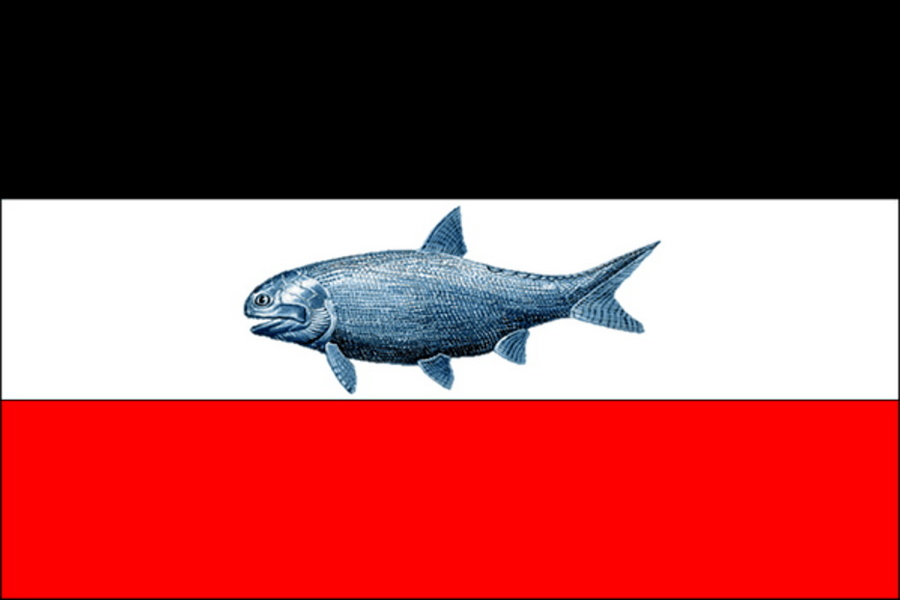
Žilov flag

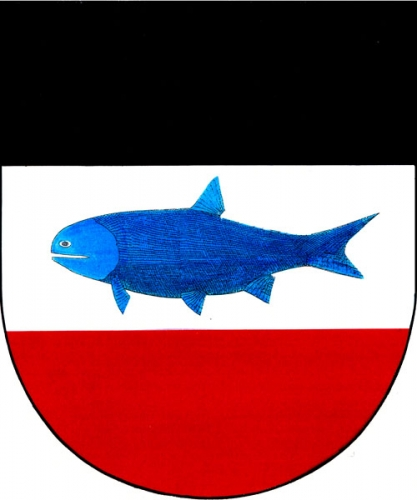
Žilov coat of arms

== See also ==
- Prehistoric fish
- List of prehistoric bony fish
