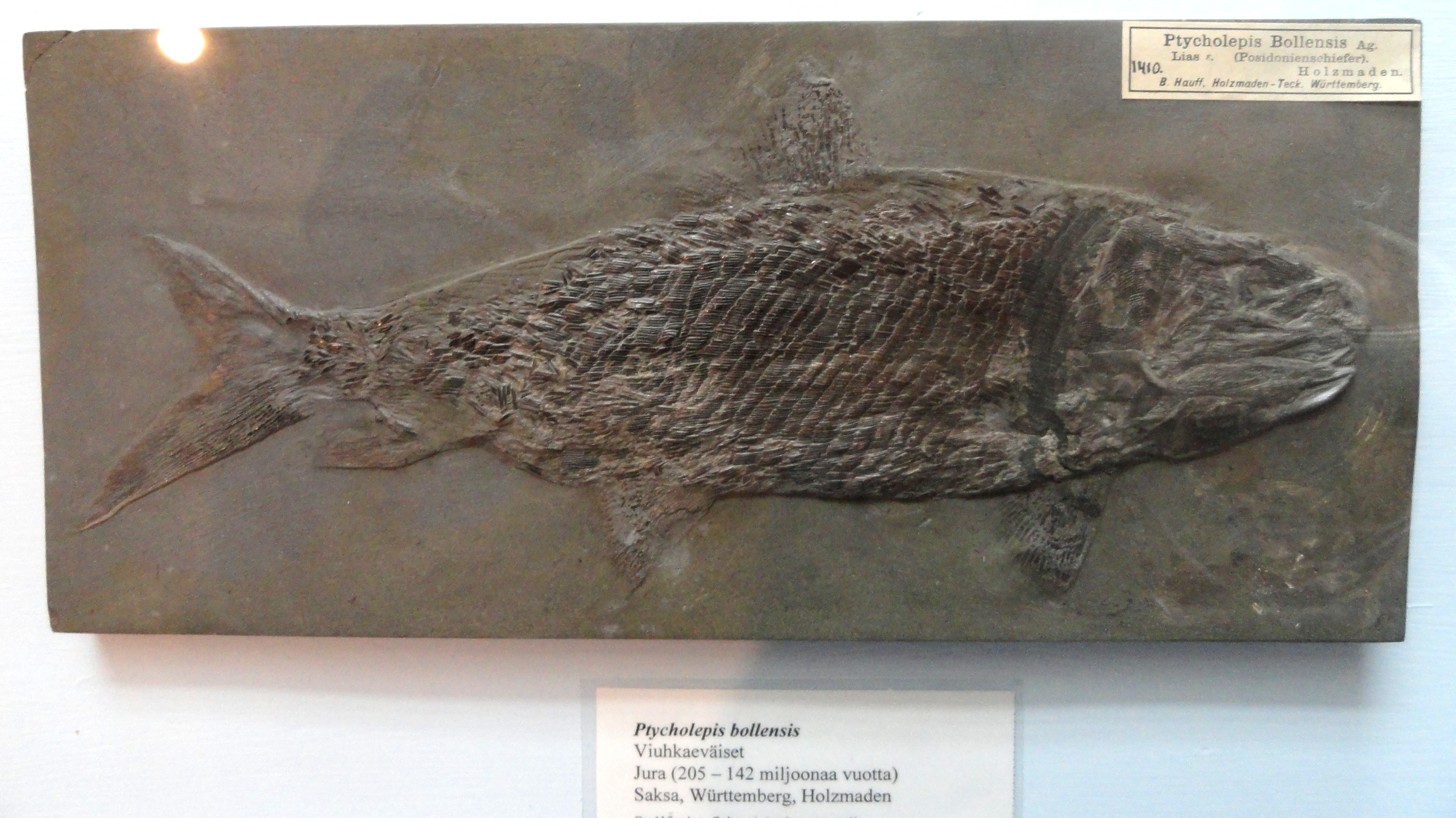
- Ptycholepis bollensis

Scientific classification
- Kingdom: Animalia
- Phylum: Chordata
- Class: Actinopterygii
- Order: †Ptycholepiformes
- Family: †Ptycholepididae
- Genus: †Ptycholepis; Agassiz, 1833

Type species
- †Ptycholepis bollensis Agassiz, 1833

Species
- †P. avus Kner, 1866; †P. barboi Bassani, 1886; †P. curtus Egerton, 1854; †P. gracilis (Davis, 1884); †P. huoae Xu, 2026; †P. magnus Bürgin, 1992; †P. marshi Newberry, 1878; †P. minor Egerton, 1852; †P. monilifer Woodward, 1895; †P. priscus Bürgin, 1992; †P. raiblensis Bronn, 1859; †P. schaefferi Bürgin, 1992

= Ptycholepis =

Ptycholepis Temporal range: Middle Triassic–Early Jurassic

Extinct genus of fishes

Ptycholepis is an extinct genus of prehistoric ray-finned fish having the head and opercular bones ornamented with ridges of ganoin, minute teeth, and thick scales (which are much longer than deep and are grooved longitudinally on the outer side).

Ptycholepis belongs to the family Ptycholepidae (= Boreosomidae/Chungkingichthyidae). Other genera of this family are Acrorhabdus (Spitsbergen, Early Triassic), Ardoreosomus (Nevada, United States; Early Triassic), Boreosomus (global, Early Triassic), Chungkingichthys (China, Early Triassic) and Yuchoulepis (China, Early Triassic). A typical feature of this family is the dorsal fin, which inserts at the level of the pelvic fins in the front part of the body. Other characters include the striated skull bones and scales, and the small teeth.

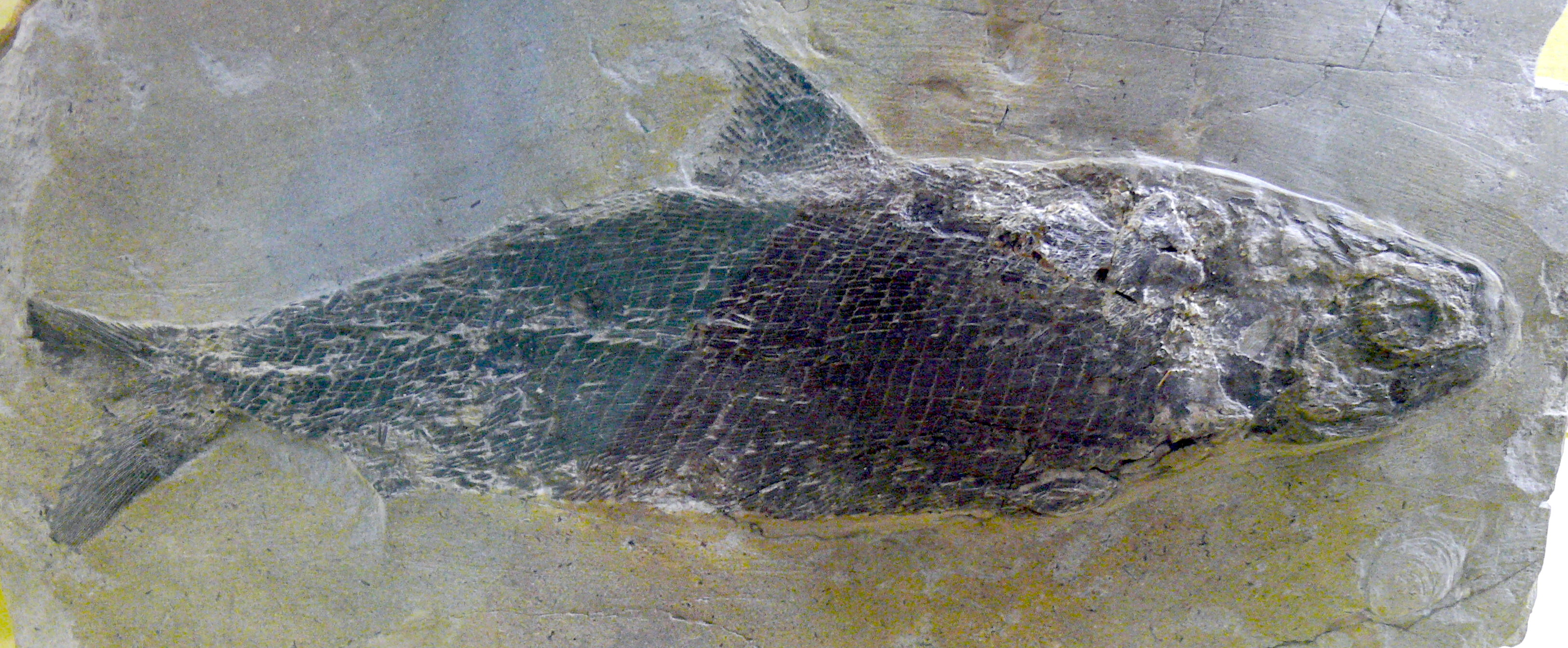
Ptycholepis bollensis

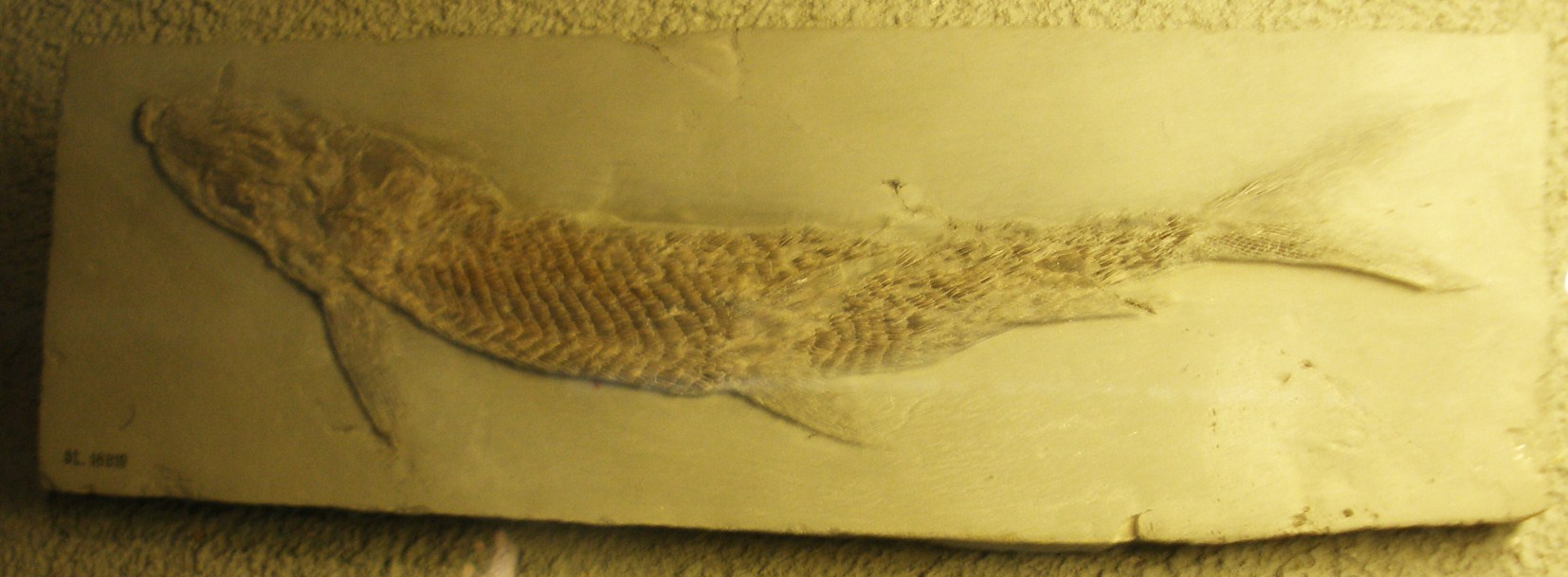
Ptycholepis bollensis

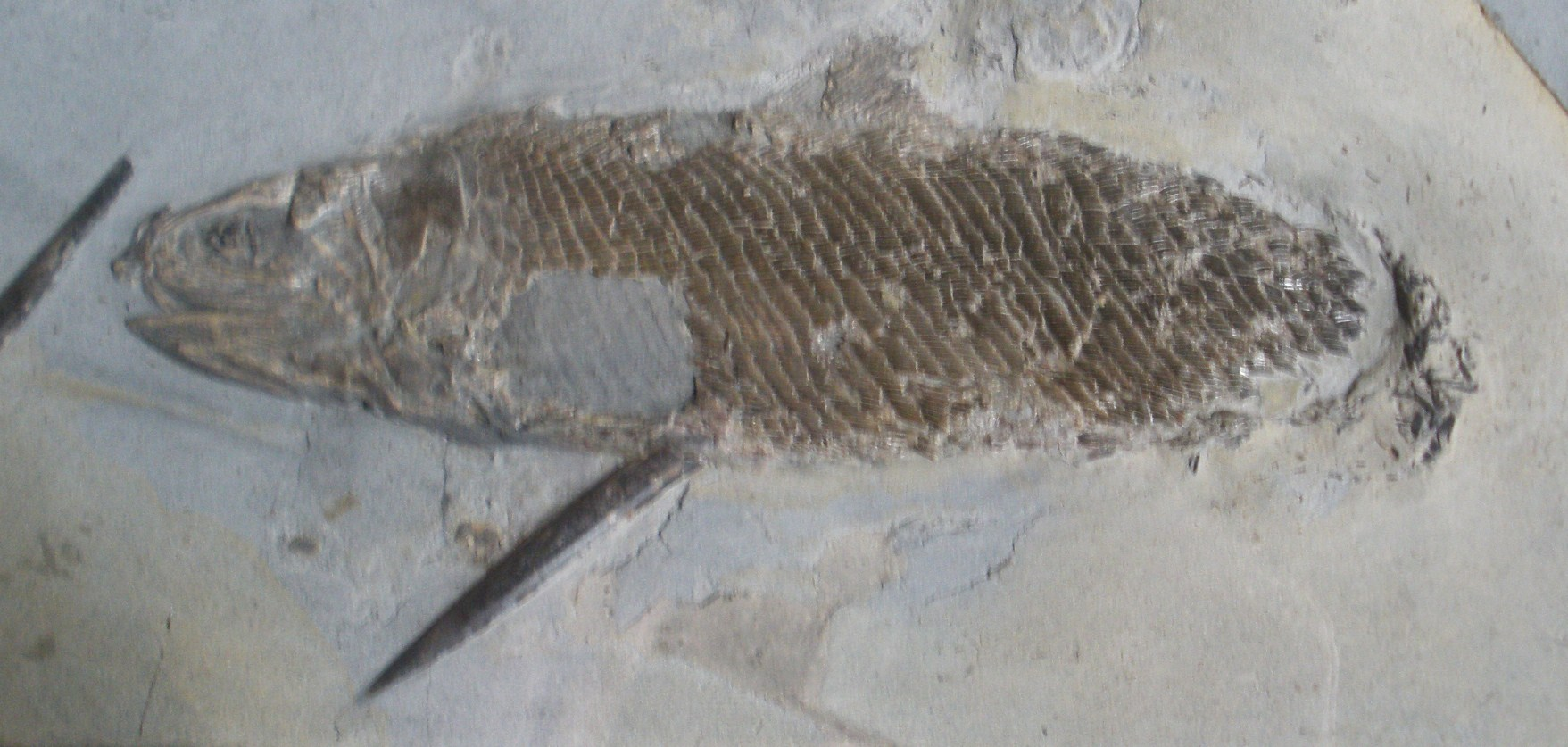
Ptycholepis sp.

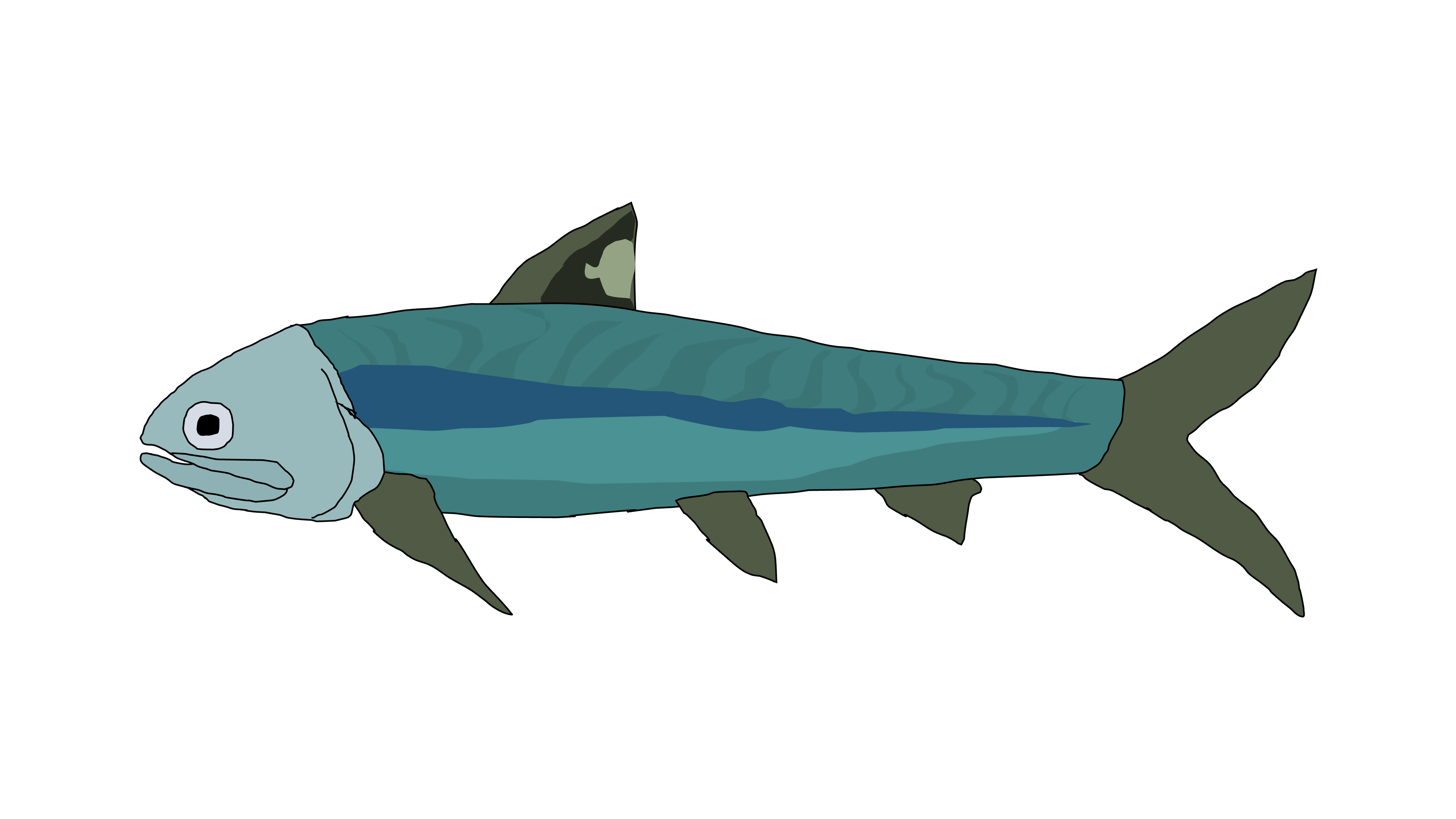
Life restoration

== See also ==
- Prehistoric fish
- List of prehistoric bony fish
