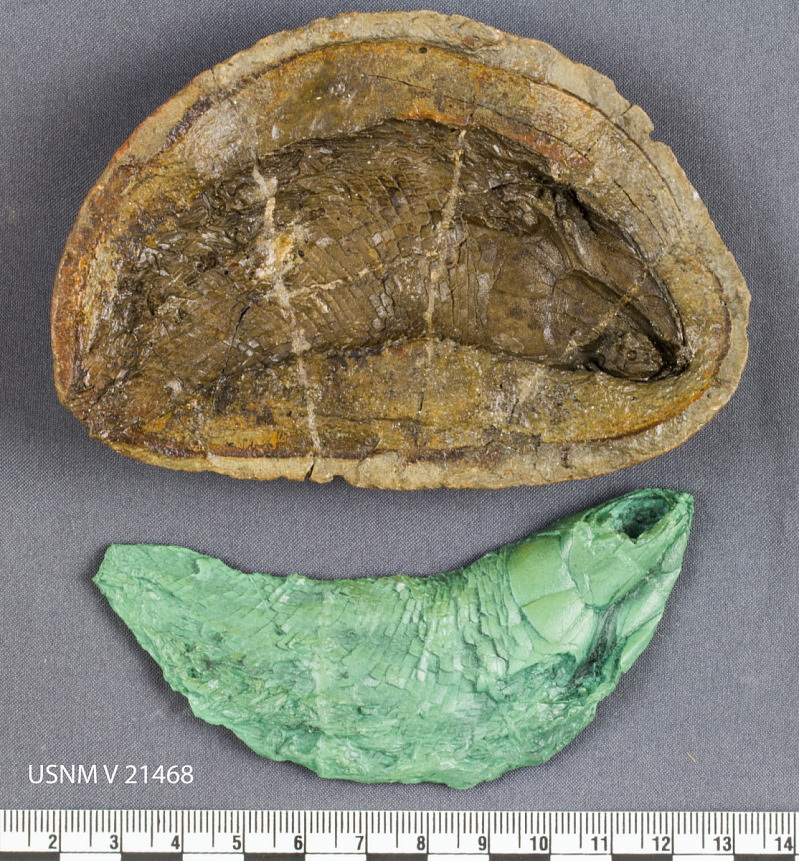
- Boreosomus gillioti: fossil mold and latex cast

Scientific classification
- Kingdom: Animalia
- Phylum: Chordata
- Class: Actinopterygii
- Order: †Ptycholepiformes
- Family: †Ptycholepididae
- Genus: †Boreosomus; Stensiö, 1921

Type species
- †Acrolepis arctica Woodward, 1912

Synonyms
- Diaphorognathus Brough, 1933

= Boreosomus =

Boreosomus Temporal range: Early Triassic to Middle Triassic

Extinct genus of fishes

Boreosomus (meaning: "boreal body") is an extinct genus of Triassic marine ray-finned fish. It was first described from the Arctic island of Spitsbergen (Svalbard, Norway), hence its genus name, but was later also discovered in other parts of the world. The type species is Boreosomus arcticus (= Acrolepis arctica Woodward, 1912).

== Classification ==
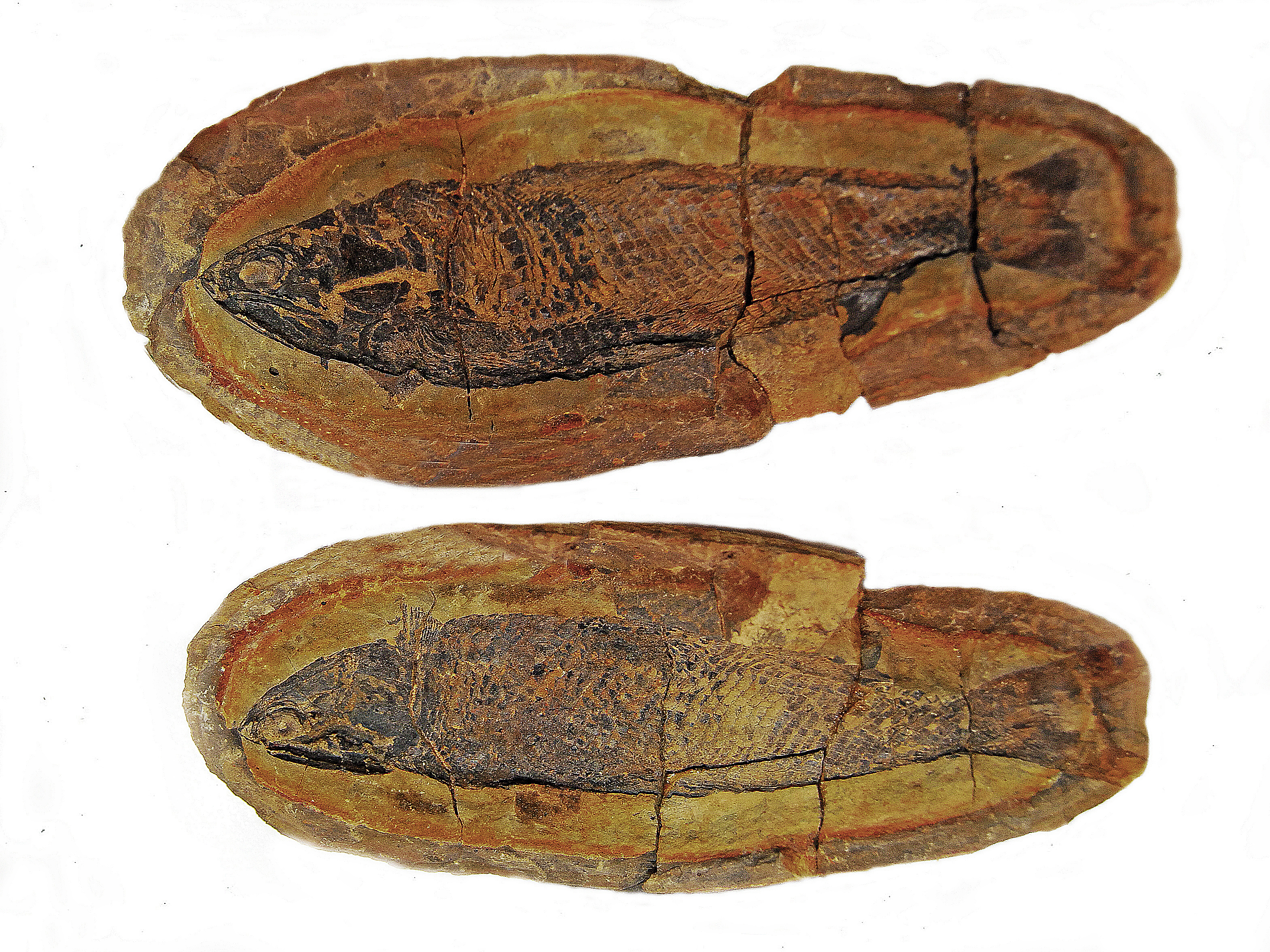
Boreosomus gillioti fossil from Beroroha, Madagascar

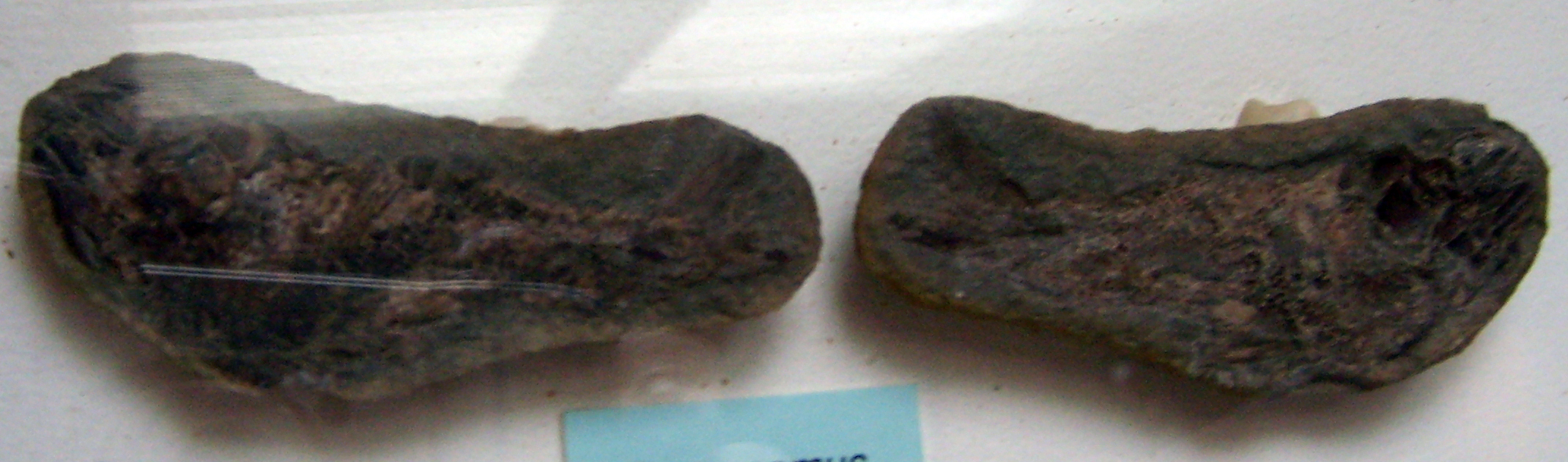
Boreosomus slab and counterslab fossils at the Geological Museum in Copenhagen

Boreosomus belongs to the family Ptycholepidae (= Boreosomidae/Chungkingichthyidae). Other genera of this family are Acrorhabdus (Spitsbergen), Ardoreosomus (Nevada, United States), Chungkingichthys (China), Ptycholepis (global) and Yuchoulepis (China).

Some studies recover Boreosomus as a potential chondrostean.

== Description ==
A characteristic feature of Boreosomus and other ptycholepids is the dorsal fin, which inserts at the level of the pelvic fins in the middle portion of the body. Most contemporary ray-fins have their dorsal fin in a more posterior position, often opposite to the anal fin. Also typical for ptycholepids are the somewhat rectangular, horizontally arranged suborbital bones.

Boreosomus gillioti could reach a body length of about 10–20 cm (3.9–7.9 in). Caudal fin was divided. Scales were strong and rectangular.

== Fossil record ==
Boreosomus had a worldwide distribution during the Early Triassic and is also known from the Middle Triassic. Fossils of Boreosomus were found, apart from Spitsbergen (Svalbard), in Greenland, Madagascar, China (Shaanxi), Spain (Catalonia), United States (Arizona), and Canada (British Columbia).

== Species ==
- †Boreosomus arcticus (Woodward, 1912) [Acrolepis arctica Woodward 1912] (type species) - Early Triassic (Induan) of Svalbard
- †Boreosomus gillioti (Priem, 1924) [Diaphorognathus gillioti (Priem 1924); Gyrolepis gillioti Priem 1924] - Early Triassic (Induan) of Madagascar
- †Boreosomus piveteaui Nielsen, 1942 - Earliest Triassic (Induan) of Greenland
- †Boreosomus reuterskioeldi Stensiö, 1921 - Early Triassic (Induan) of Svalbard
- †Boreosomus scaber Stensiö, 1921 - Early Triassic (Spathian) of Svalbard

Indeterminate species are known from the Early Triassic of Canada (British Columbia) and China (Guizhou), as well as the Middle Triassic of Svalbard, Spain, and possibly the United States (Arizona).

The species B. merlei is now placed in Australosomus.

== See also ==
- Prehistoric fish
- List of prehistoric bony fish
