= Ardoreosomus =

Ardoreosomus Temporal range: Induan
- Ardoreosomus occidentalis fossil (type)

Scientific classification
- Kingdom: Animalia
- Phylum: Chordata
- Class: Actinopterygii
- Order: †Ptycholepiformes
- Family: †Ptycholepididae
- Genus: †Ardoreosomus; Romano et al., 2019
- Species: †A. occidentalis

Binomial name
- †Ardoreosomus occidentalis Romano et al., 2019

Extinct genus of fishes

Ardoreosomus (meaning: "tropical body") is an extinct genus of marine ray-finned fish. It was described from the Induan aged Candelaria Formation of Nevada, United States, which was located near the equator during the Early Triassic epoch. It contains only one species, A. occidentalis (monotypy).

Ardoreosomus is a ptycholepiform, closely resembling Boreosomus and Ptycholepis; however, Ardoreosomus is distinguished from other ptycholepiforms in having a more strongly angled hyomandibula and lacking an opercular process, among other features.

== See also ==
- Prehistoric fish
- List of prehistoric bony fish
- Paleontology in Nevada
