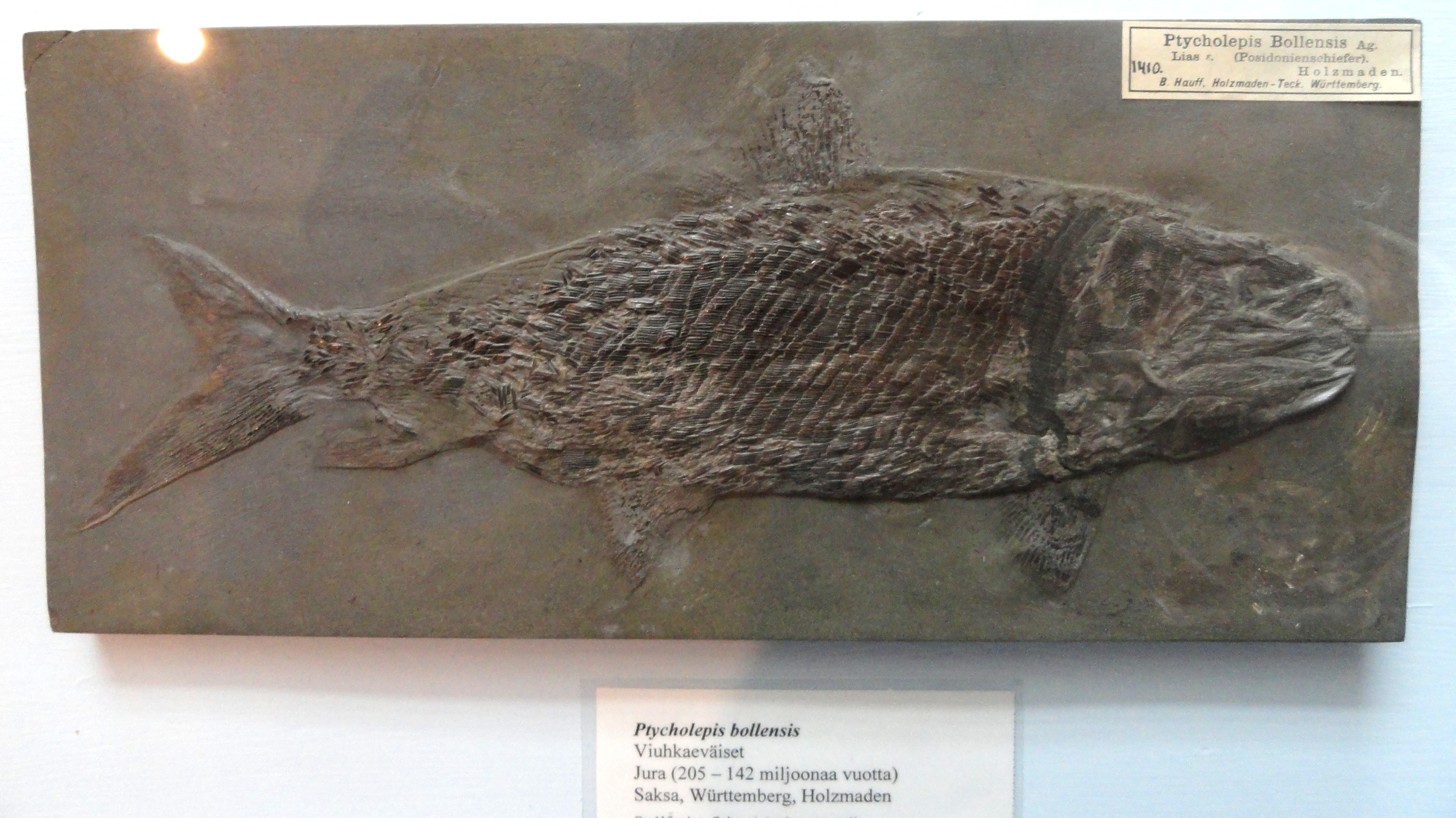
- Ptycholepis bollensis fossil

Scientific classification
- Kingdom: Animalia
- Phylum: Chordata
- Class: Actinopterygii
- Order: †Ptycholepiformes; Andrews et al. 1967

Families
- †Boreosomidae Gardiner 1967; †Chungkingichthyidae Su 1974; †Ptycholepididae Brough 1939 corrig.

= Ptycholepiformes =

Ptycholepiformes Temporal range: Induan-Pliensbachian

Extinct order of fishes

Ptycholepiformes are an extinct order of prehistoric ray-finned fish that existed during the Triassic period and the Early Jurassic epoch. The order includes the genera Acrorhabdus, Ardoreosomus, Boreosomus, Chungkingichthys, Ptycholepis, and Yuchoulepis. Although several families have been proposed, some studies place all these genera in the same family, Ptycholepididae.

Ptycholepiformes had a widespread distribution during the Early Triassic, but were restricted to mainly Europe and North America afterwards. They are known from both marine and freshwater deposits.

== Appearance ==
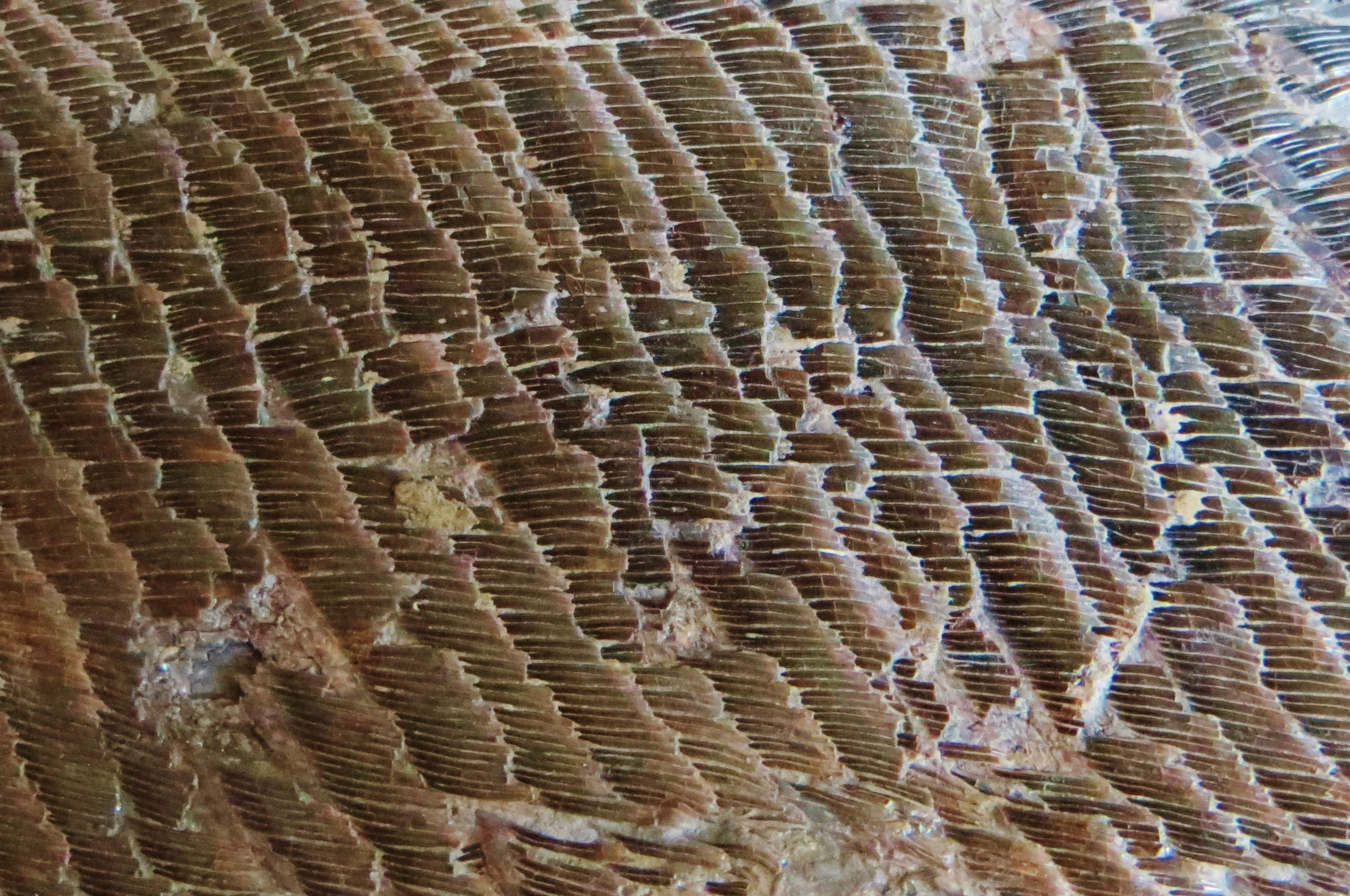
Scales of Ptycholepis bollensis

Typical features of ptycholepiforms are the fusiform body covered in rhombic ganoid scales, the anterior position of the dorsal fin. In most coeval ray-fins the dorsal fin has a more posterior position, usually situated opposite to the anal fin. Moreover, ptycholepiforms show a series of elongate, horizontal suborbital bones. The skull is usually relatively large.

The scales are typically equipped with distinct longitudinal ridges. In Ptycholepis, the scales are low, whereas in genera, such as Ardoreosomus and Boreosomus, the scales are deeper. Peg-and-socket articulation between scales is present.

Species reached body sizes between 10 centimetres (0.33 ft) and 45 centimetres (1.48 ft).

== Systematics ==
Triassic Ardoreosomus fossil

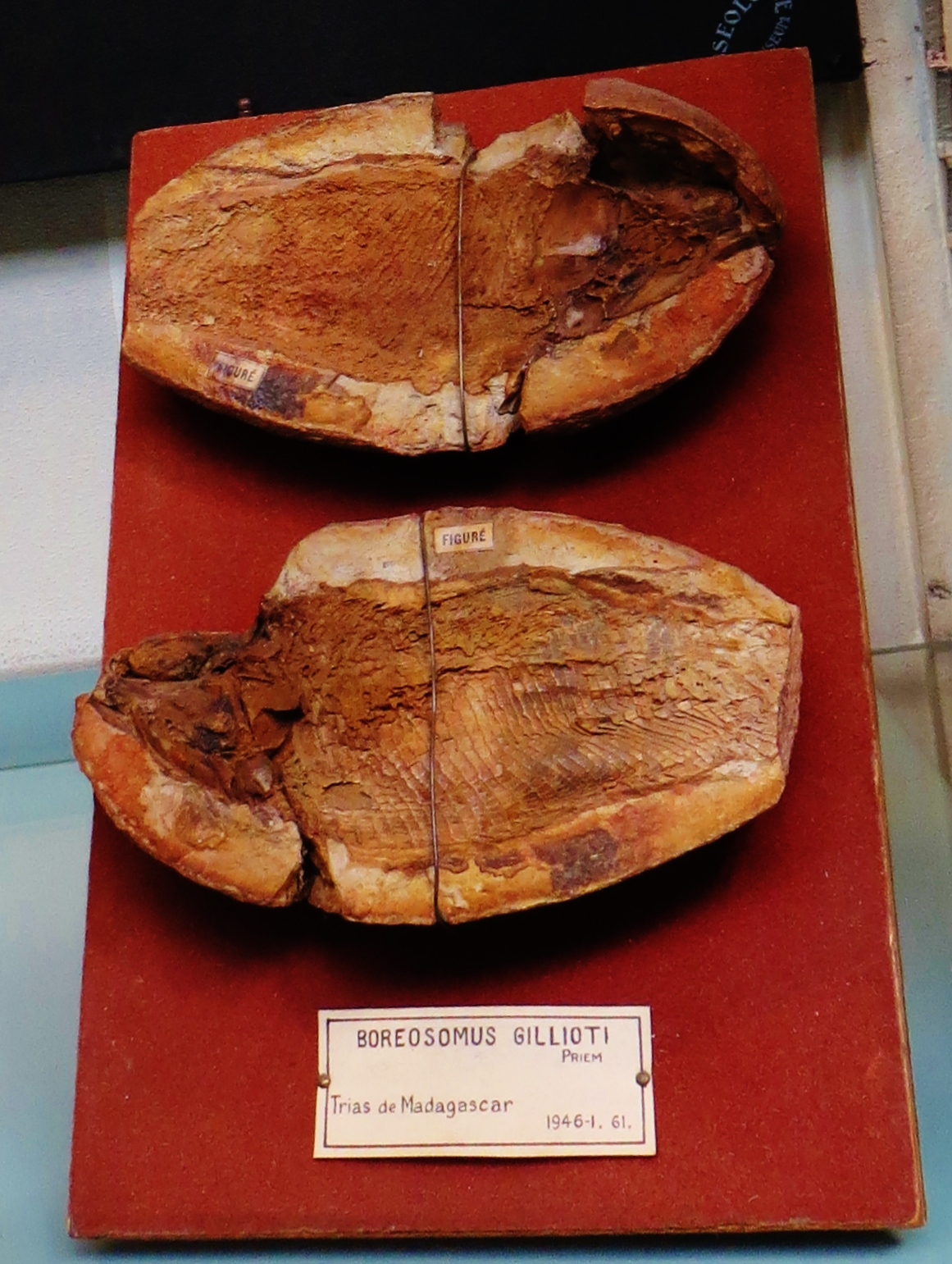
Triassic Boreosomus fossil

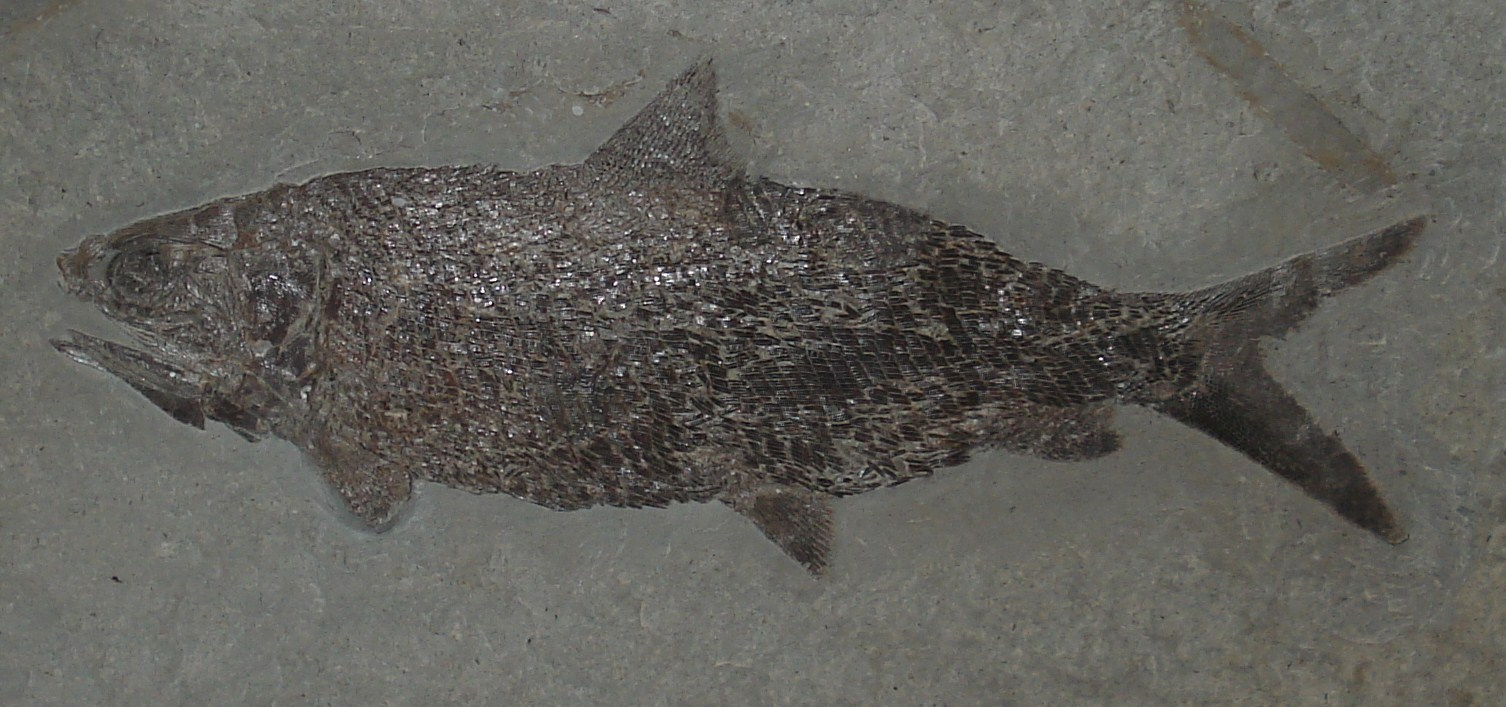
Jurassic Ptycholepis fossil

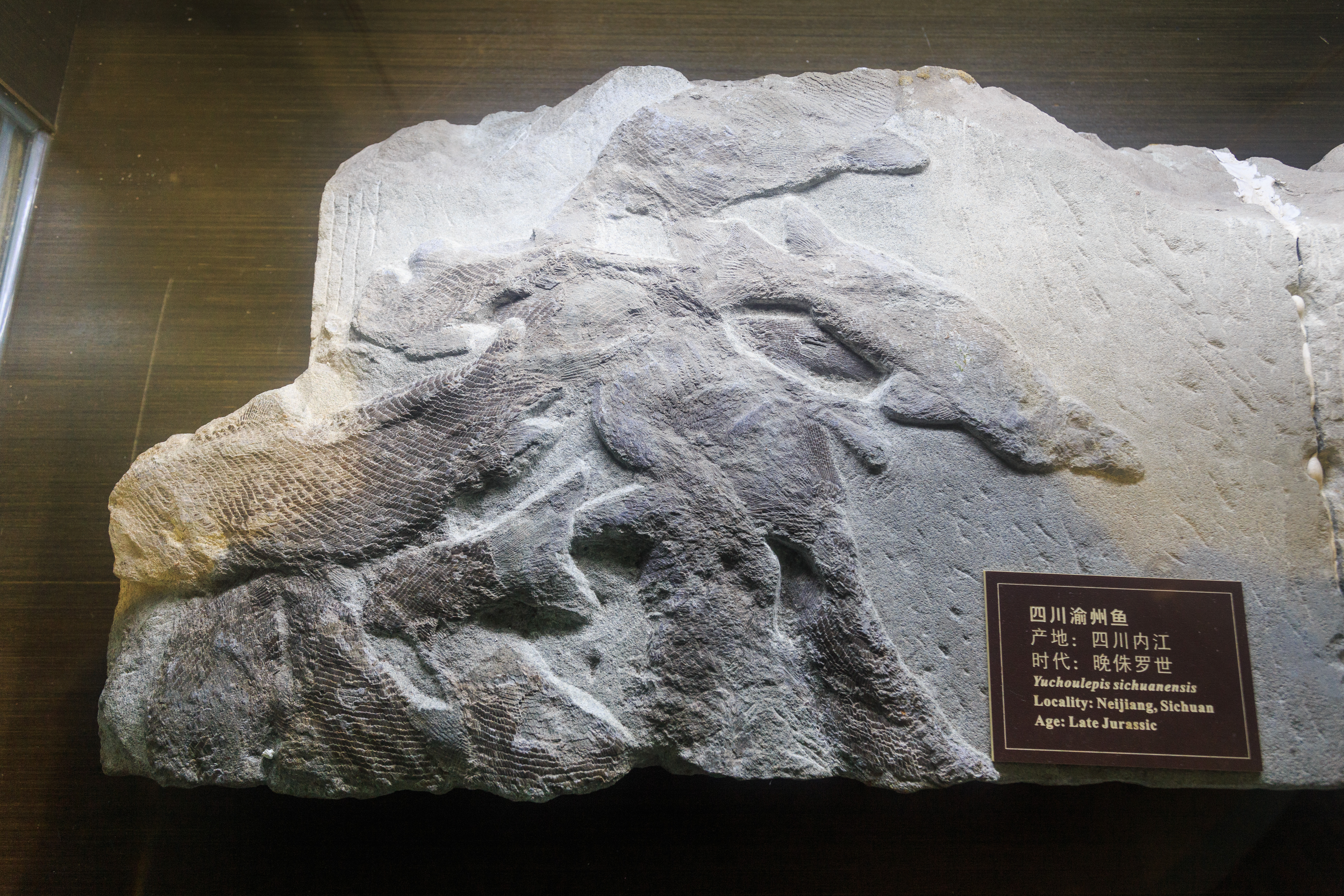
Triassic Yuchoulepis fossil

The evolutionary relationships of Ptycholepiformes are poorly known, but most cladistic analyses place them outside of the Neopterygii. A close relationship between Ptycholepididae and the Carboniferous to Early Triassic Acrolepididae was proposed based on some similarities, but support from phylogenetic analyses is scarce.

- Order †Ptycholepidiformes Andrews et al. 1967
  - Family incertae sedis
    - Genus †Ardoreosomus Romano et al., 2019
      - †Ardoreosomus occidentalis Romano et al., 2019 (type species)
  - Family †Boreosomidae Gardiner 1967
    - Genus †Acrorhabdus Stensiö,1921
      - †Acrorhabdus asplundi Stensiö, 1921
      - †Acrorhabdus bertili Stensiö, 1921 (type species)
      - †Acrorhabdus latistriatus Stensiö, 1921
    - Genus †Boreosomus Stensiö 1921 [Diaphorognathus Brough 1933]
      - †Boreosomus arcticus (Woodward, 1912) [Acrolepis arctica Woodward 1912] (type species)
      - †Boreosomus gillioti (Priem, 1924) [Diaphorognathus gillioti (Priem 1924); Gyrolepis gillioti Priem 1924]
      - †Boreosomus merlei Beltan, 1957
      - †Boreosomus piveteaui Stensiö, 1921
      - †Boreosomus reuterskioeldi Stensiö, 1921
      - †Boreosomus scaber Stensiö, 1921
  - Family †Chungkingichthyidae Su 1974
    - Genus †Chungkingichthys Su, 1974
      - †Chungkingichthys tachuensis Su, 1974 (type species)
  - Family †Ptycholepididae Brough, 1939 corrig.
    - Genus †Ptycholepis Agassiz, 1832 non Gray 1842 ex Richardson, 1843
      - †Ptycholepis barboi Bassani, 1886
      - †Ptycholepis bollensis Agassiz, 1833 (type species)
      - †Ptycholepis calloviensis Kaznyshkin, 1990
      - †Ptycholepis curta Egerton, 1854
      - †Ptycholepis gracilis Davis, 1884
      - †Ptycholepis magna Bürgin, 1992
      - †Ptycholepis marshii Newberry, 1878
      - †Ptycholepis monilifer Woodward, 1895
      - †Ptycholepis prisca Bürgin, 1992
      - †Ptycholepis schaefferi Bürgin, 1992
    - Genus †Yuchoulepis Su, 1974
      - †Yuchoulepis gansuensis Su, 1993
      - †Yuchoulepis szechuanensis Su, 1974 (type species)
