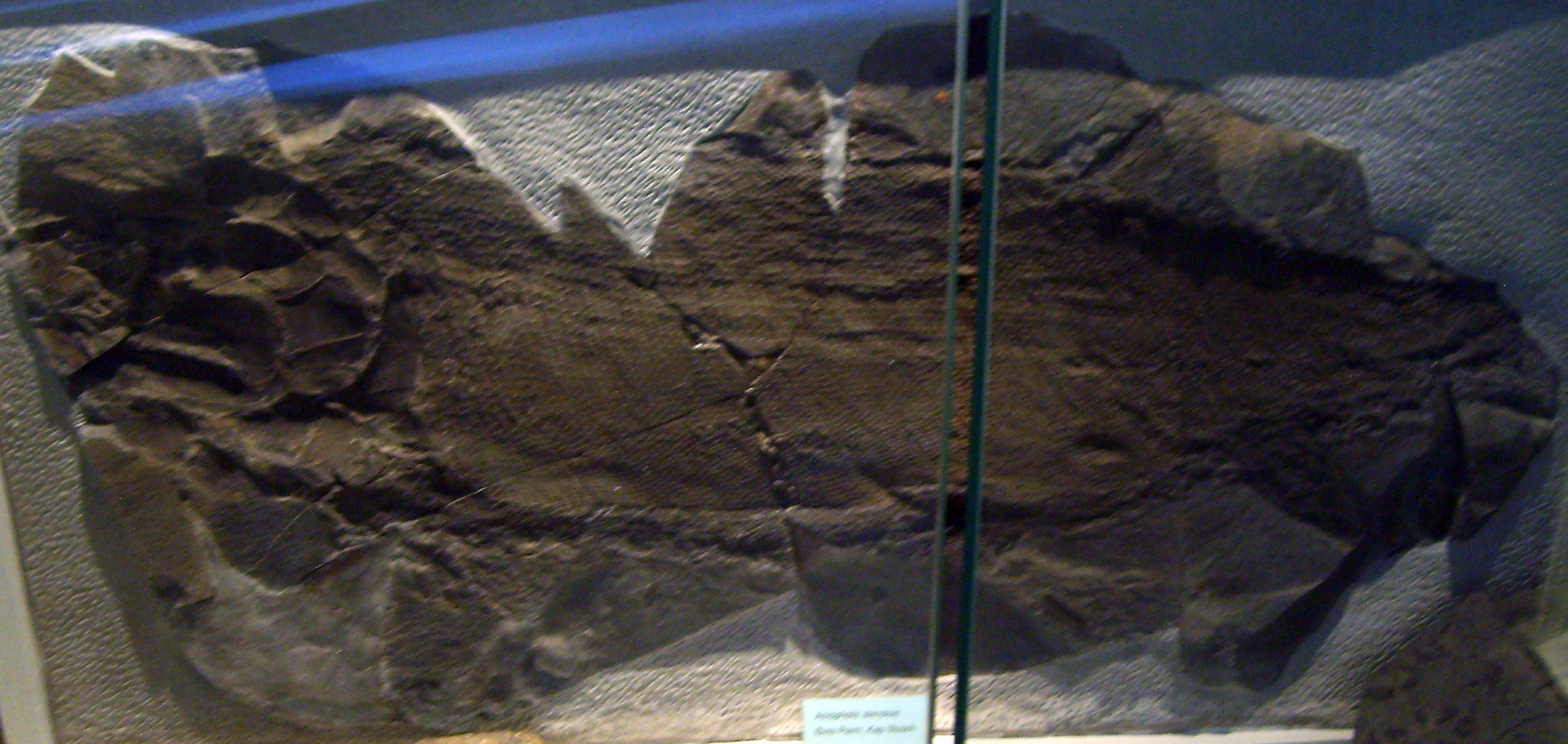
- A. stensioei fossil, Geological Museum, Copenhagen

Scientific classification
- Domain: Eukaryota
- Kingdom: Animalia
- Phylum: Chordata
- Class: Actinopterygii
- Order: †Elonichthyiformes
- Family: †Acrolepididae
- Genus: †Acropholis; Aldinger, 1937

Type species
- †A. stensioei Aldinger, 1937

Species
- See text

= Acropholis =

Acropholis Temporal range: Wuchiapingian272.5–254.0 Ma

Extinct genus of fishes

Acropholis is an extinct genus of prehistoric marine bony fish that lived during the Wuchiapingian age (Lopingian/late Permian epoch) in what is now Greenland and Hesse (Germany).

The following species are known:

- A. kamensis Esin, 1995
- A. silantievi Esin and Mashin, 1996
- A. stensioiei Aldinger, 1937

== See also ==
- Prehistoric fish
- List of prehistoric bony fish
