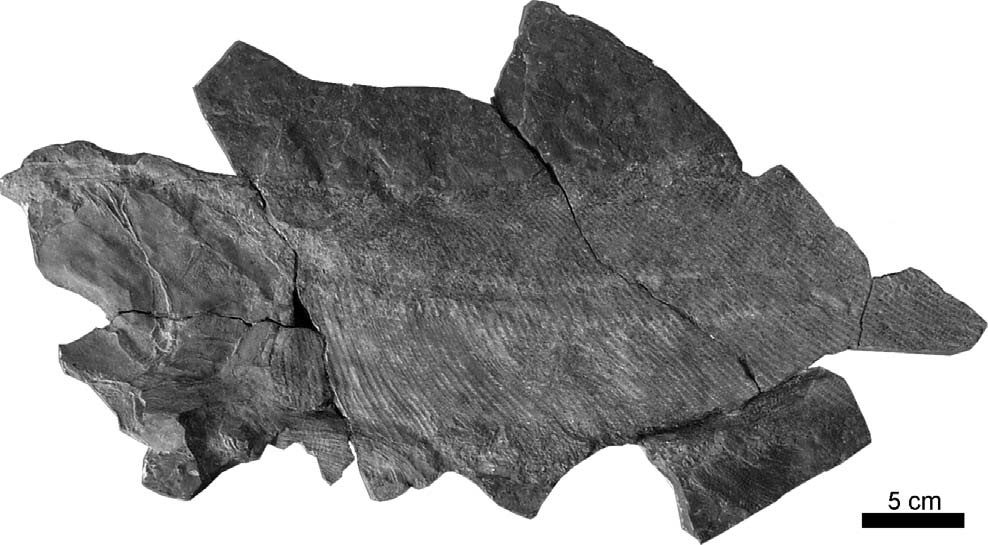
- Fossil of Challaia elongata

Scientific classification
- Kingdom: Animalia
- Phylum: Chordata
- Class: Actinopterygii
- Order: †Elonichthyiformes
- Family: †Acrolepidae
- Genus: †Challaia; Rusconi, 1946

Type species
- †Challaia magna Rusconi, 1949

Other species
- †Challaia elongata (Cabrera, 1944)

= Challaia =

Challaia Temporal range: Ladinian

Extinct genus of fishes

Challaia is an extinct genus of prehistoric freshwater ray-finned fish that lived during the Triassic period in what is now Argentina (Mendoza). Two species are known, C. magna (type species), most likely from the Cerro de Las Cabras Formation, and C. elongata (previously assigned to Myriolepis) from the Los Rastros Formation. Three other species, C. multidentata, C. striata and C.? cacheutensis, are considered nomina dubia.

C. elongata is the youngest known member of the Acrolepididae, a family of early ray-finned fishes that was dominant throughout the late Paleozoic, and survived into the Triassic.

== See also ==
- Prehistoric fish
- List of prehistoric bony fish
