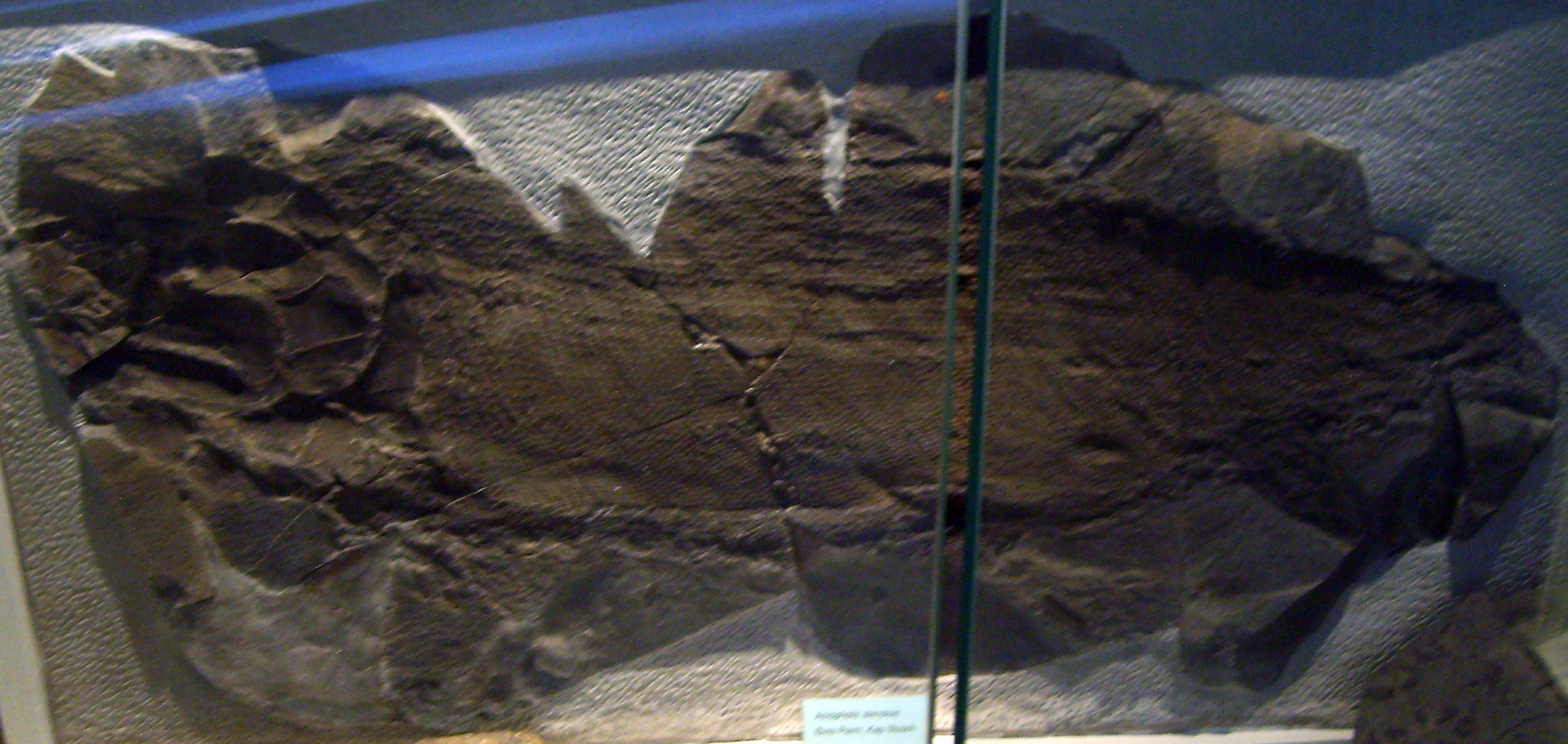
- Acropholis stensioei fossil

Scientific classification
- Kingdom: Animalia
- Phylum: Chordata
- Class: Actinopterygii
- Order: †Elonichthyiformes
- Family: †Acrolepididae; Aldinger, 1937

Genera
- †Acrolepis; †Acropholis; †Challaia; †Namaichthys; †Plegmolepis; †Reticulolepis

Synonyms
- Acrolepidae Aldinger 1937

= Acrolepididae =

Acrolepididae Temporal range: Tournaisian to Early Triassic

Extinct family of fishes

Acrolepididae is an extinct family of ray-finned fish. Genera referred to Acrolepididae existed from the Early Carboniferous period to the Early Triassic epoch. They were nektonic carnivores with a fusiform body.

Acrolepididae may be closely related with the Early Mesozoic Ptycholepididae.

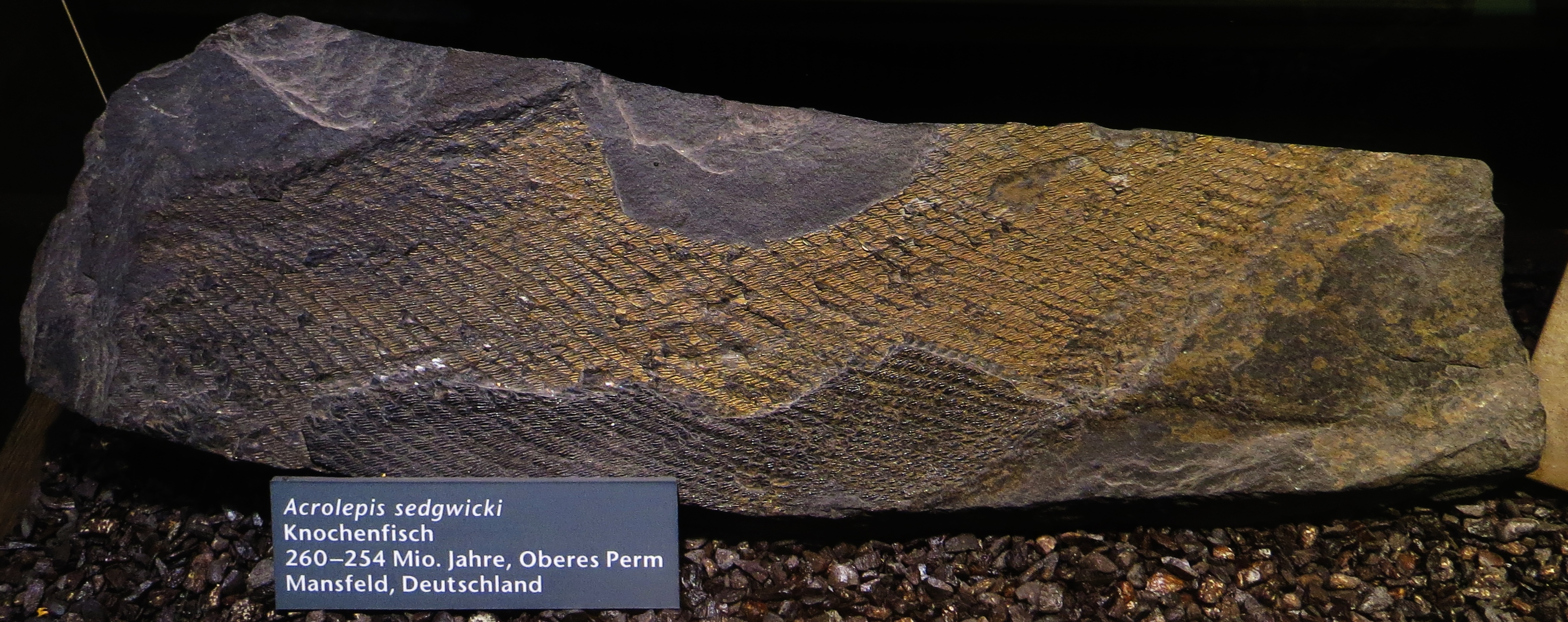
Fossil of Acrolepis sedgwicki

== Included genera and species ==
- Genus †Acrolepis Agassiz, 1843
  - †Acrolepis frequens Yankevich, 1996
  - †Acrolepis gigas Frič, 1877
  - †Acrolepis hamiltoni Johnston & Morton, 1890
  - †Acrolepis hopkinsi M'Coy, 1848
  - †Acrolepis hortonensis Dawson, 1868
  - †Acrolepis? laetus Lambe, 1916 [Pteronisculus? laetus]
  - †Acrolepis languescens Yankevich, 1996
  - †Acrolepis ortholepis Traquair, 1884
  - †Acrolepis sedgwicki Agassiz, 1843 (type species)
  - †Acrolepis semigranulosa Traquair, 1890
  - †Acrolepis tasmanicus Johnston & Morton, 1891
  - †Acrolepis wilsoni Traquair, 1888
- Genus †Acropholis Aldinger, 1937
  - †Acropholis stensioei Aldinger, 1937 (type species)
- Genus †Challaia Rusconi, 1946
  - †Challaia magna Rusconi, 1949 (type species)
  - †Challaia elongata (Cabrera, 1944)
- Genus †Namaichthys Gürich, 1923
  - †Namaichthys digitata (Woodward, 1890)
  - †Namaichthys schroederi Gürich, 1923 (type species)
- Genus †Plegmolepis Aldinger, 1937
  - †Plegmolepis groenlandica Aldinger, 1937
  - †Plegmolepis kochi Aldinger, 1937 (type species)
- Genus †Reticulolepis Westoll, 1934
  - †Reticulolepis exsculpta (Kurtze, 1839)
