= Žilov =

- Municipality
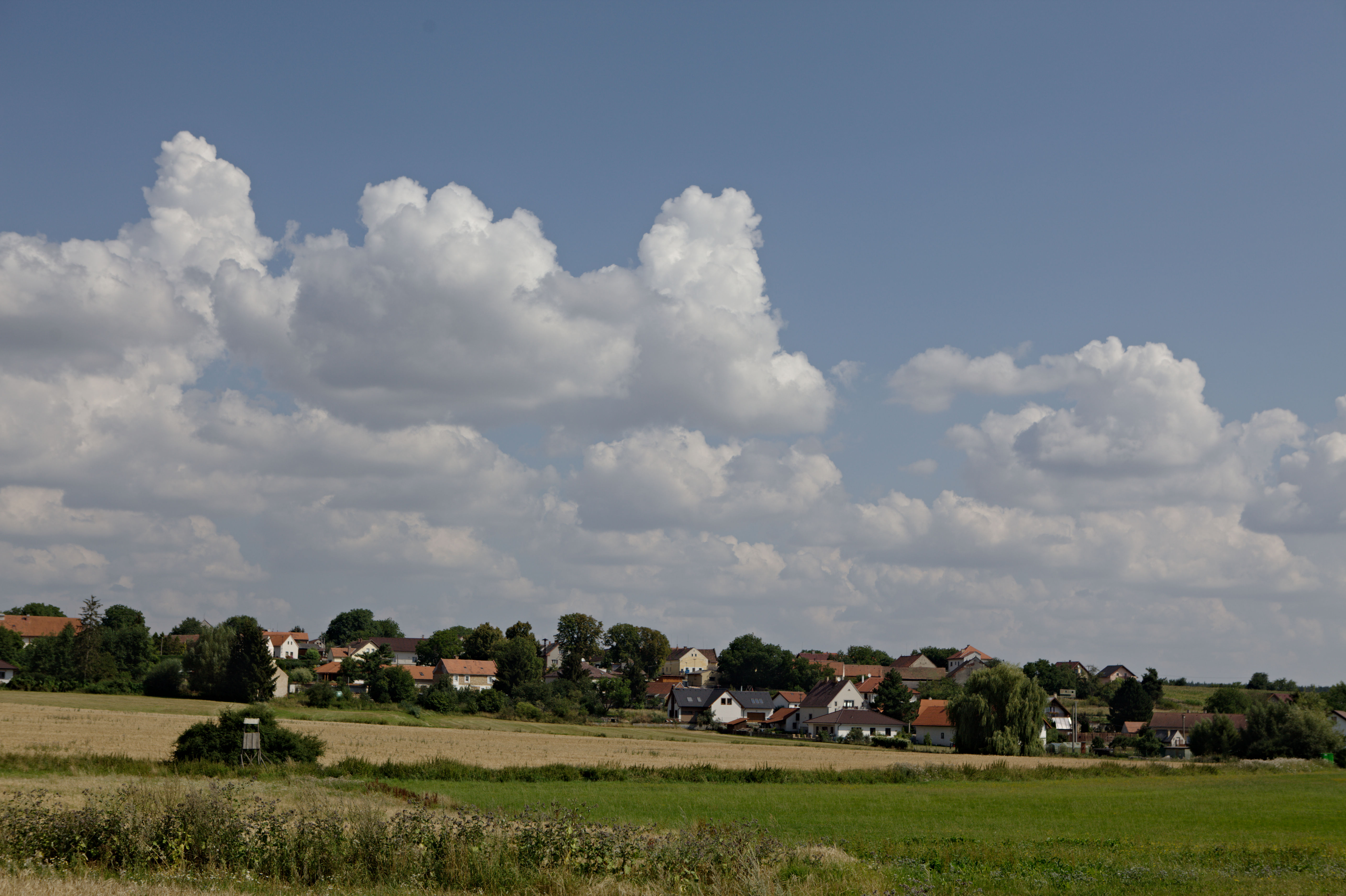
- View from the south

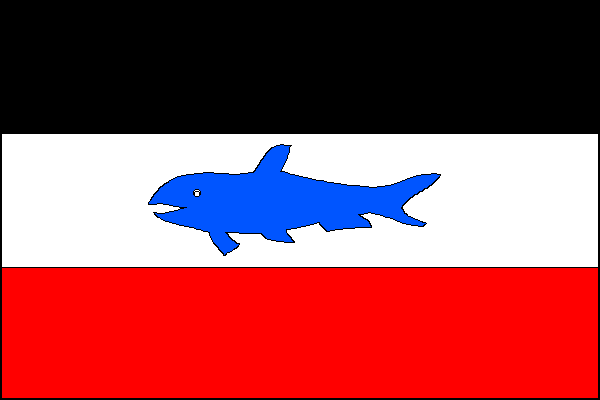
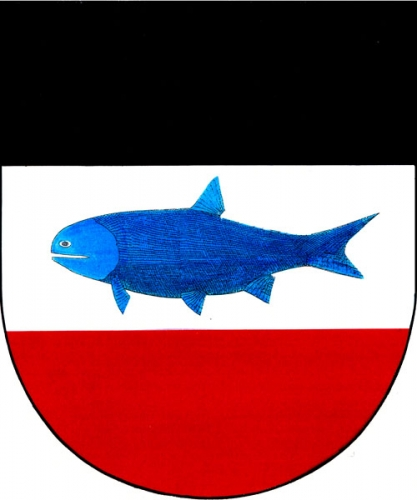
- Flag Coat of arms

- Location in the Czech Republic
- Coordinates: 49°50′24″N 13°18′48″E
- Country: Czech Republic
- Region: Plzeň
- District: Plzeň-North
- First mentioned: 1269

Area
  - Total: 6.33 km^{2} (2.44 sq mi)
- Elevation: 423 m (1,388 ft)

Population (2026-01-01)
  - Total: 459
  - Density: 72.5/km^{2} (188/sq mi)
- Time zone: UTC+1 (CET)
  - Summer (DST): UTC+2 (CEST)
- Postal code: 330 11
- Website: www.zilov.cz

Žilov is a municipality and village in Plzeň-North District in the Plzeň Region of the Czech Republic. It has about 500 inhabitants.

Žilov lies approximately 12 kilometres (7 mi) north of Plzeň and 84 km (52 mi) west of Prague.

== Administrative division ==
Žilov consists of two municipal parts (in brackets population according to the 2021 census):

- Žilov (262)
- Stýskaly (208)

== Demographics ==
Historical population
Year	Pop.	±%
1869	343	—
1880	415	+21.0%
1890	409	−1.4%
1900	415	+1.5%
1910	469	+13.0%
1921	439	−6.4%
1930	497	+13.2%
1950	384	−22.7%
1961	415	+8.1%
1970	346	−16.6%
1980	372	+7.5%
1991	376	+1.1%
2001	383	+1.9%
2011	427	+11.5%
2021	470	+10.1%
Source: Censuses
