= Ligulella =

Ligulella Temporal range: ?Kimmeridgian Possible Middle Jurassic occurrence

Scientific classification
- Kingdom: Animalia
- Phylum: Chordata
- Class: Actinopterygii
- Division: Teleostei
- Order: †Ligulelliformes; Taverne, 2011
- Family: †Ligulellidae; De Saint Seine, 1955
- Genus: †Ligulella de Saint Seine, 1955
- Species: †L. sluysi

Binomial name
- †Ligulella sluysi De Saint Seine, 1955

Synonyms
- †Ligulella fourmarieri de Saint Seine & Casier, 1962

Extinct genus of ray-finned fishes

Ligulella is an extinct genus of freshwater stem-teleost ray-finned fish that lived in what is now the Democratic Republic of the Congo during the Late Jurassic epoch. It contains one species, Ligulella sluysi from the likely Kimmeridgian-aged Stanleyville Formation. Ligulella is the only member of the family Ligulellidae and the order Ligulelliformes. It was one of a number of early-diverging, highly evolutionarily distinct stem-teleosts from the Jurassic of the Congo, which also included the families Catervariolidae, Lombardinidae, Signeuxellidae and Majokiidae.
