= Neopholidophoropsis =

Neopholidophoropsis Temporal range: Aptian

Scientific classification
- Kingdom: Animalia
- Phylum: Chordata
- Class: Actinopterygii
- Order: †Ankylophoriformes
- Family: †Ankylophoridae
- Genus: †Neopholidophoropsis; Taverne, 1981
- Species: †N. serrata

Binomial name
- †Neopholidophoropsis serrata Taverne, 1981

Extinct genus of ray-finned fishes

Neopholidophoropsis is an extinct genus of stem-teleost ray-finned fish that lived in what is now Germany during the Aptian stage of the Early Cretaceous epoch. It contains one species, Neopholidophoropsis serrata.
