= Hengnania =

Hengnania Temporal range: Early Jurassic

Scientific classification
- Kingdom: Animalia
- Phylum: Chordata
- Class: Actinopterygii
- Order: †Pholidophoriformes
- Genus: †Hengnania; Wang, 1977
- Species: †H. gracilis

Binomial name
- †Hengnania gracilis Wang, 1977

Extinct genus of fishes

Hengnania is an extinct genus of prehistoric freshwater ray-finned fish from the Jurassic of Asia. It contains a single species, H. gracilis from the Early Jurassic of Hunan, China. It is considered a "pholidophoriform" of uncertain affinities. Its fossils are common in the deposits in which it has been found.
