= Tetrapterus =

Scientific classification
- Domain: Eukaryota
- Kingdom: Animalia
- Phylum: Chordata
- Class: Actinopterygii
- Order: Perciformes
- Genus: †Tetrapterus

Extinct genus of fishes

Tetrapterus (from Greek: τετρα tetra, 'four' and Greek: πτερόν pteron 'wing') is an extinct genus of prehistoric perciform fish.

== See also ==
- Prehistoric fish
- List of prehistoric bony fish
