= Platylates =

Platylates Temporal range: Early Oligocene

Scientific classification
- Domain: Eukaryota
- Kingdom: Animalia
- Phylum: Chordata
- Class: Actinopterygii
- Order: Perciformes
- Genus: †Platylates; Storms, 1887

Extinct genus of fishes

Platylates is an extinct genus of prehistoric bony fish that lived during the early Oligocene epoch.

== See also ==
- Prehistoric fish
- List of prehistoric bony fish
