= Sponysedrion =

Scientific classification
- Kingdom: Animalia
- Phylum: Chordata
- Clade: Sarcopterygii
- Genus: †Sponysedrion; Campbell & Barwick, 1983

Extinct genus of fishes

Sponysedrion is an extinct genus of prehistoric bony fish.

== See also ==
- Prehistoric fish
- List of prehistoric bony fish
