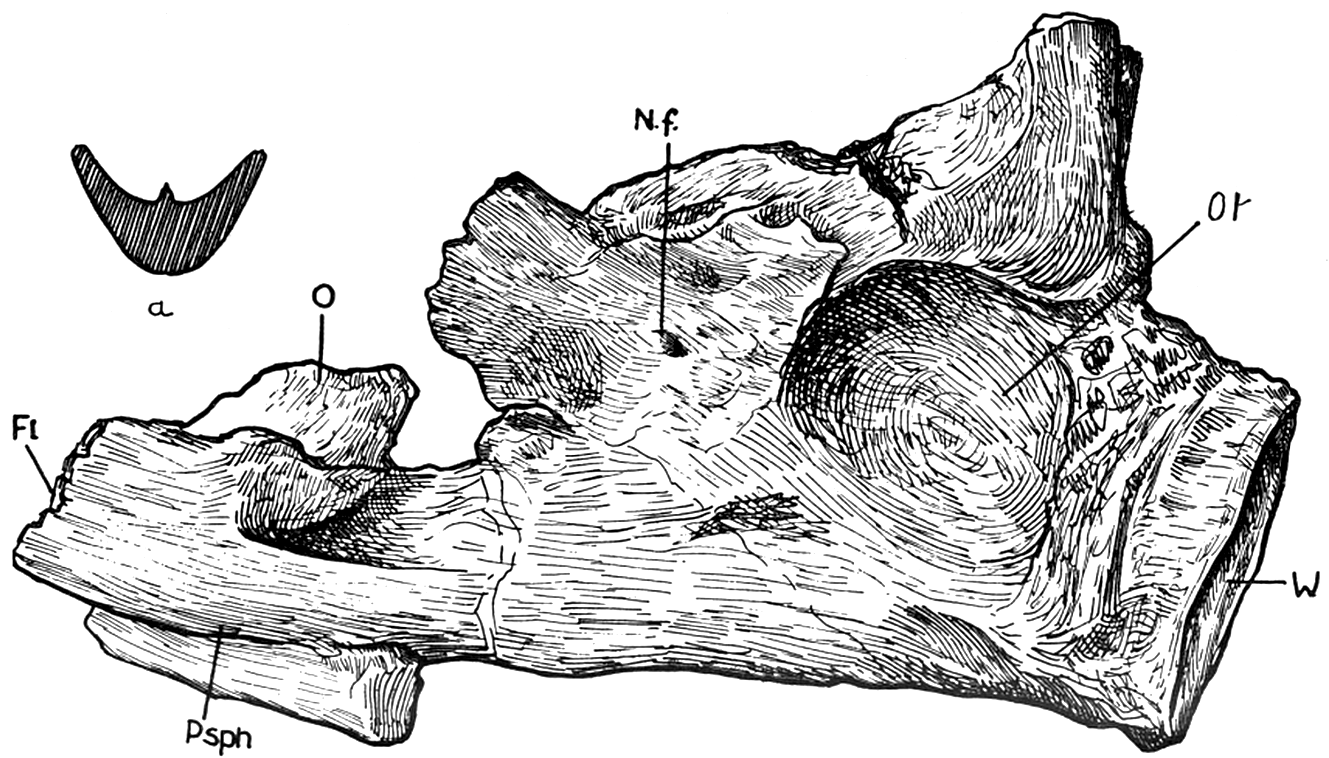
- Holotype skull

Scientific classification
- Kingdom: Animalia
- Phylum: Chordata
- Class: Actinopterygii
- Division: Teleostei
- Order: †Tselfatiiformes
- Family: †Plethodidae
- Genus: †Paranogmius; Weiler, 1935
- Species: †P. doederleini

Binomial name
- †Paranogmius doederleini Weiler, 1935

Synonyms
- Concavotectum moroccensis? Cavin & Forey, 2008

= Paranogmius =

Paranogmius Temporal range: Late Cretaceous (Cenomanian), 99.6–93.5 Ma

Extinct genus of fishes

Paranogmius (from the Greek para "near" and Anogmius, as in Bananogmius) is a genus of plethodid fish that lived in present-day Egypt during the Late Cretaceous period. It was described by German scientist Wilhelm Weiler in 1935. The genus contains a single species, P. doederleini, named on the basis of a fragmentary skull. Additionally, another skull and several vertebrae were unearthed as well. These fossils were collected by Austro-Hungarian paleontologist Richard Markgraf during an expedition to the Bahariya Oasis in western Egypt, in rock from the Bahariya Formation. This formation dates to the Cenomanian stage of the Late Cretaceous, which lasted from 101 to 94 million years ago. All of these remains were destroyed in 1944 during the Bombing of Munich in World War II.

The holotype skull included much of the posterior (back) portion of the skull, such as the orbit region, parasphenoid, and anteriormost (frontmost) trunk vertebra. Paranogmius is the largest known member of Plethodidae, reaching 3 meters (9.8 ft) in total length with a 45 centimeters (1.48 ft) long head. The jaws of Paranogmius were also unique among plethodids as the teeth are arranged in patches instead of contiguous lines like in Bananogmius. Its vertebrae were large, disc-like, and short, with some measuring 12.5 centimetres (4.9 in) in diameter and 3.5 centimetres (1.4 in) thick. The dermopalatine, also known as the chewing plate, was large, flat, and adorned with small teeth. Ecologically, Paranogmius was a filter-feeder that preyed on small invertebrates.

Paranogmius is a member of the Plethodidae, a family of bony fishes. It is the basalmost member of the family yet contains a mix of primitive and derived characteristics. Another tselfatiiform from the Kem Kem Beds of Morocco, Concavotectum, may be a synonym of Paranogmius, however this is still debated. The genus coexisted with other giant fishes like Mawsonia, Onchopristis, and Bawitius, large crocodylomorphs like Stomatosuchus, and a host of dinosaurs like Spinosaurus, Paralititan, and Tameryraptor. During the Cenomanian, the Bahariya Formation was on the margin of the Tethys Sea, and represented a large network of mangrove swamps, rivers, and tidal flats.

== Discovery and taxonomy ==
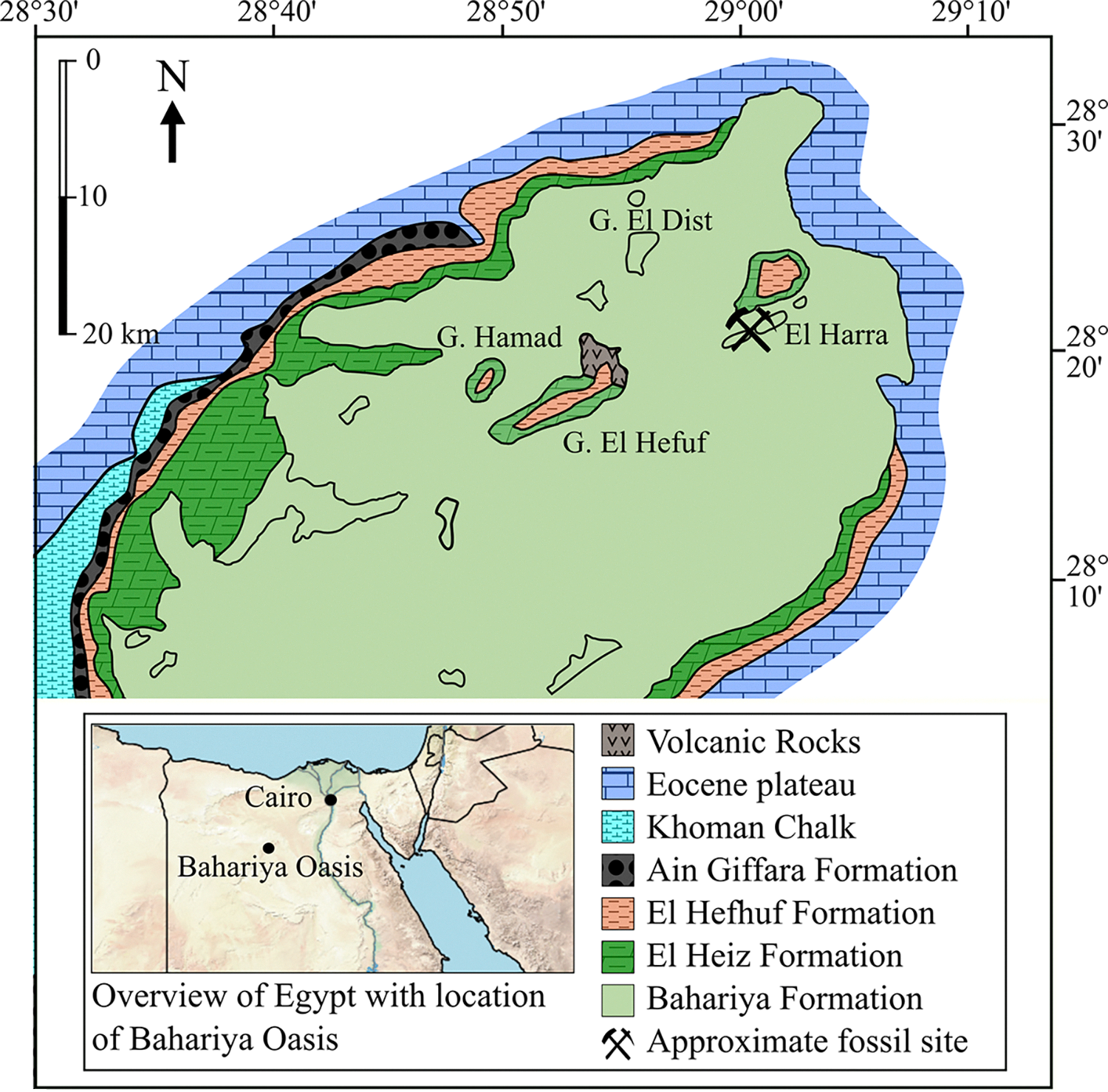
Geological map of the Bahariya Formation, with Gebel El Dist labelled

Fossils of Paranogmius were first unearthed in 1912 by crews working for German paleontologist Ernst Stromer in the Gebel El Dist and Ain Murün localities in the Bahariya Oasis in western Egypt. The remains found at the Gebel El Dist locality were in several horizons of greyish sandy mudstone at the base of the outcrop. These mudstones derive from the Bahariya Formation, which contains strata dating to the Cenomanian stage of the Late Cretaceous period. From Gebel El Dist an incomplete skull was found, while at Ain Murün an associated specimen including an incomplete skull and several vertebrae (backbones) was collected. These fossils were then taken to the Paläontologisches Museum München (Bavarian State Collection of Paleontology) and cataloged. The skull from Gebel El Dist (BSPG 1912 VIII 99) included some of the posterior (back) region of the skull including the orbit region, parasphenoid, and anteriormost (frontmost) trunk vertebra. Much of the neurocranium (brain-bearing area of the skull) was found, however it was brittle and in poor condition. As for the other skull (BSPG 1912 V III 202), it included part of the posterior portion of the skull, the preoperculum (the bone between the gill cover and the cheek), and the neurocranium. A series of seven articulated trunk vertebrae and a quadrate, likely from the same individual as BSPG 1912 V III 202, were collected as well.

In 1935, German scientist Wilhelm Weiler described Paranogmius doederleini as a new genus and species of plethodid fish based on one of the skulls. The generic name, Paranogmius, combines the Greek word para/παρα ("near") and Anogmius, the name formerly used for Bananogmius. The name Anogmius itself comes from the Greek ὄγμος (ógmos, "furrow, path"). The specific name doederleini honors the 80th birthday of German zoologist Ludwig Doederlein. Weiler selected BSPG 1912 VIII 99 as the holotype specimen (the specimen used for the basis of naming a new species). In 1936, Stromer published a review of the fossils found in the Bahariya Formation, including those of Paranogmius. In this paper, Stromer stated that Paranogmius was known from two localities: Gebel el Dist and Ain Murün. At the former, the holotype skull was known in addition to several newly assigned fragments, including skull bones, vertebrae, and several other bone fragments. Both authors noted the exceptionally large size of the remains and their similarities to plethodids known from the Niobrara Formation of Kansas, such as Anogmius (Bananogmius). During the night of 24–25 April 1944, the Paläontologisches Museum München was severely damaged during the British bombing of Munich in World War II. All known fossils of Paranogmius were destroyed in the attack. Due to personal and political tensions between Stromer and the museum's curator, who was a fervent Nazi, the fossils were not rehoused prior to the bombing. Stromer's finds, including Paranogmius, received little academic or public attention.

=== Recent study and Concavotectum ===
Since their destruction, no other fossils have been definitively assigned to the genus. Only images from Weiler's and Stromer's publications remain. Paranogmius was briefly mentioned in literature for decades until 2003, wherein Taverne reanalyzed figures of the material and concluded it was a basal plethodid. Stromer (1936) assigned an isolated vomer (a bone at the roof of the mouth) to Anogmius (Bananogmius) which French paleontologist Louis Taverne ascribed to Paranogmius in 2003. However, in 2008 British paleontologists Lionel Cavin and Peter Forey argued that the convex articular surfaces of the vomer and the braincase means that they do not match and that the vomer must come from a different taxon. In 2005, Taverne and French paleontologist Mireille Gayet conducted a review of Plethodidae in which they diagnosed the genus and compared it to other genera. Additionally, they performed a phylogenetic analysis which recovered Paranogmius as the basalmost member of Plethodidae. The results of the analysis can be seen below:

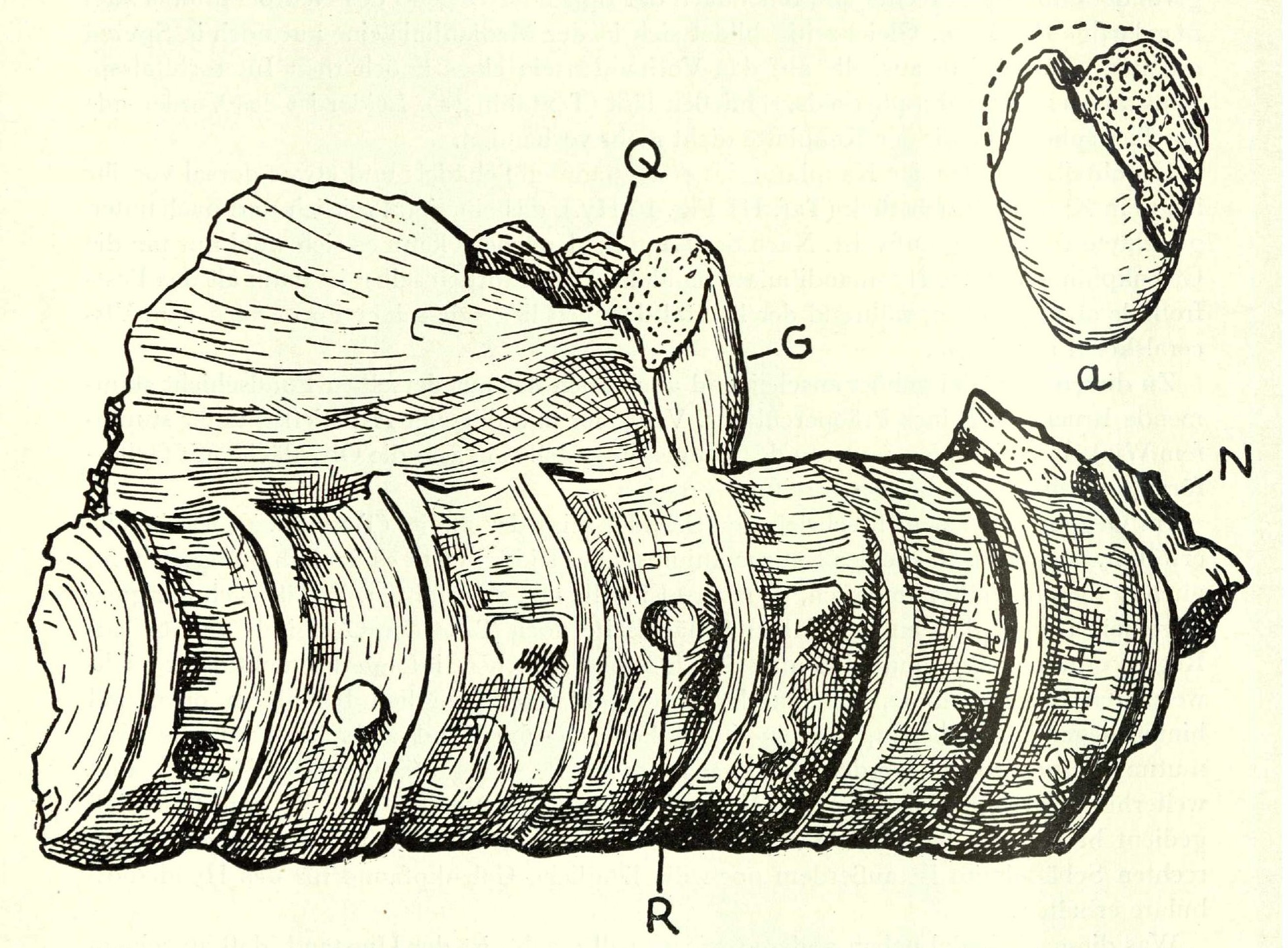
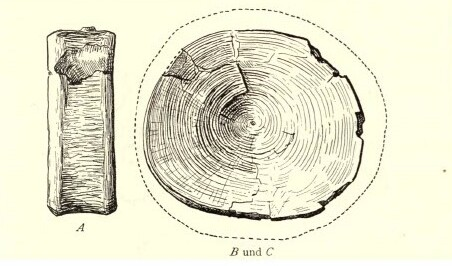
Vertebrae of Paranogmius; vertebral column (top) and vertebral centrum (bottom)

- - Tselfatiiformes
    - Protobramidae
      - Abisaadichthys
      - - Eusebichthys
        - Protobrama
    - - Eoplethodidae
        Eoplethodus
      - Plethodidae
        - Paranogmius
        - - - Bananogmius
            - - Luxilites
              - - Syntegmodus
                - Niobrara
          - - - Martinichthys
              - - Pseudothryptodus
                - - Thryptodus
                  - Plethodus
            - - Pseudanogmius
              - - Moorevillia
                - - Pentanogmius
                  - - Zanclites
                    - - Bachea
                      - - Enischnorhynchus
                        - - Tselfatia
                          - Dixonanogmius

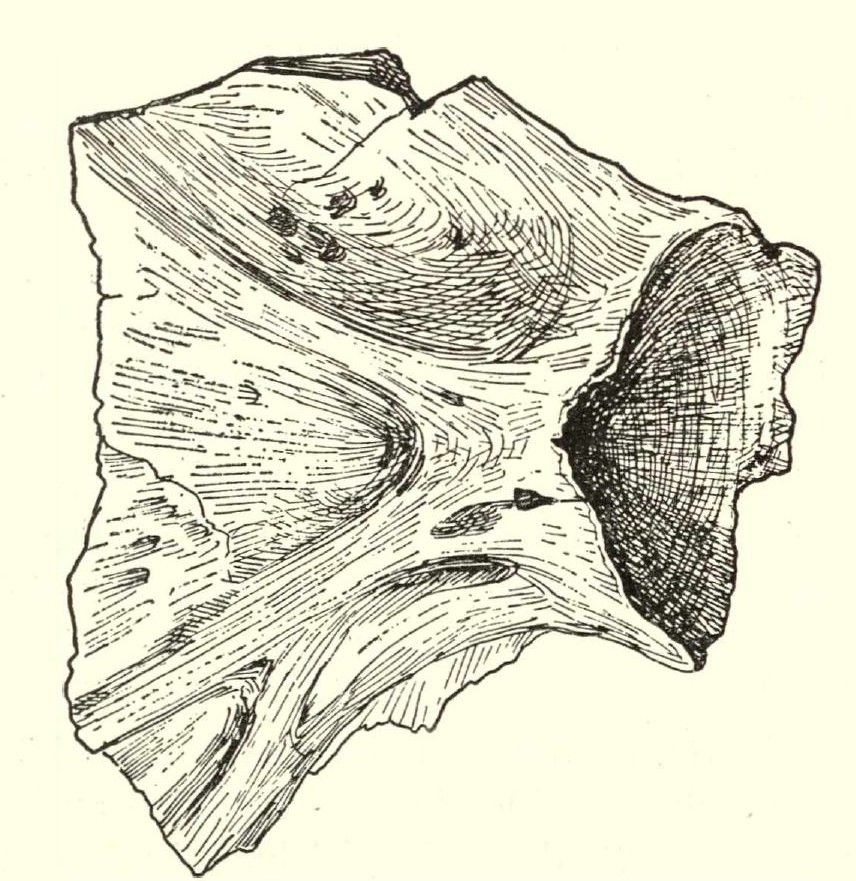
A hypural plate (a bony plate at the base of the caudal fin)

In 2008, Cavin and Forey described a new genus and species of tselfatiiform, Concavotectum moroccensis, from the Kem Kem Beds of southeastern Morocco. This species was named on the basis of a nearly complete skull that had been unearthed in an unknown locality by domestic fossil dealers. The Kem Kem Beds is a roughly contemporaneous geologic unit which also dates to the Cenomanian and has a similar faunal composition to the Bahariya Formation, with potentially the dinosaurs Deltadromeus and Spinosaurus, fish Mawsonia, and several elasmobranchs known from both sites. However, this has come into question and is still debated. Cavin and Forey (2008) considered Paranogmius and Concavotectum morphologically distinct because the former has a posterior (back) extension on its parasphenoid bone, a lower subtemporal fossa (a depression under the temporal bone), and a different intercalar and pterotic structure (two bones in the braincase). However, grossly the anatomy of the two genera is very similar. Additionally, Cavin and Forey (2008) provisionally considered Concavotectum valid because Paranogmius' fossils were destroyed and fragmentary, percluding a confident assessment. However, they did state that the two are likely closely related or even conspecific (the same species), which would make Concavotectum a synonym of Paranogmius, and are not plethodids but instead basal tselfatiiforms. Their statuses are still debated, with studies like by German paleontologist Felix J. Augustin and colleagues (2023) and British researcher Jamale Ijouiher (2022) stating that Concavotectum is a likely synonym of Paranogmius.Additionally, other studies have retained Paranogmius as a basal form of plethodid.

== Description ==
Overall, Paranogmius is distinguished from other plethodids by its remarkable size, with estimates placing it at 3 meters (9.8 ft) in total length with a 45 centimeters (1.48 ft) long head, making it the largest known plethodid and among the largest fish known from the Bahariya Formation. Its skull roof was relatively flat, as in other tselfatiiformes, while the snout was greatly expanded and broad, like a catfish. However, Cavin and Forey (2008) stated that its width could be a consequence of lateral crushing due to taphonomy and that the skull was in fact vaulted and narrow in life, as in Concavotectum. The skull roof was laden with small pits and grooves, likely attachment anchors for flattened denticles as in living fish. The parasphenoid of both skulls is preserved, showing it had a long, narrow rod that ran posteriorly and had a convex cross-section. This is also akin to that of Concavotectum. The supraoccipital bone is not enlarged whereas the parietals are, traits not found in other plethodids. Plethodid parietals, including Paranogmius', are often large, quadrangular in shape, and broadly affixed along the midline. However, those of more derived genera like Tselfatia and Dixonanogmius are broader than long and narrower at the midline. Similar to those of Bananogmius and Luxilites, the limbs forming the preopercle bone are of subequal length and strongly developed. An autapomorphy of Paranogmius is the presence of a subtemporal fossa, a structure lost by most derived teleosts and only found in the elopomoprhs and osteoglossomorphs. However, Paranogmius does lack a groove on its hypural plate (a plate at the base of the caudal fin), a groove absent in advanced plethodids' caudal (body) skeletons but present in Eoplethodus. This indicates that Paranogmius has a mix of derived and basal plethodid characteristics.

The jaws of Paranogmius are also unique among plethodids as the teeth are arranged in patches instead of contiguous lines like in Bananogmius. Furthermore, the border of the dentary symphysis (where the two mandibulae meet) is raised and features a spur on its dorsal (top) face. The dermopalatine, also known as the chewing plate, is large, flat, and adorned with small teeth. Its vomer is T-shaped and expands broadly at its anterior margin, another autapomorphy of the genus. Because the type has an articulated vertebra, this allowed for the identification of several isolated vertebrae that had been found in the Bahariya Formation. The centra of these vertebrae are short, disc-shaped, and circular in outline overall and have largely featureless lateral sides except for striations and trabeculae. The largest of these vertebrae (BSPG 1912 VIII 99) measured 12.5 centimetres (4.9 in) in diameter and 3.5 centimetres (1.4 in) thick. Its articular face has a uniformly convex surface with a triangular cross-section.

== Paleoecology ==
Weiler hypothesized that the close, "tightly pressed" association of the trunk vertebrae and quadrate from Paranogmius was a result of predation and scavenging. However, German paleontologist Werner Janensch stated that this association was the result of shallow marine waters and ocean waves. Other evidence of scavenging is known from the Bahariya Formation, such as in the holotype of the sauropod dinosaur Paralititan. As for its ecology, Weiler speculated that Paranogmius lived in freshwater environments in the Bahariya area, alongside turtles, the lungfish Ceratodus, an indeterminate polypterid, and the crocodylomorph Stomatosuchus. The short, deep vertebrae suggest that Paranogmius had a stubby yet deep body (hypsisomatic), similar to that of Tetrodon fahaka pufferfish that live in the modern-day Nile River. The anatomy of its dental plates suggest that it was a filter feeder that fed on small invertebrates. Furthermore, the lamellae, which absorb oxygen from flowing water, were surrounded by gill rakers that were adapted to filtering edible material from the water and consuming it. Paranogmius' possible synonym Concavotectum was also considered a filter feeder based on its edentulous jaws, funnel-like mouth, a deep branchial chamber, and long gill rakers, with a niche similar to that of the menhaden Brevoortia.

=== Paleoenvironment ===
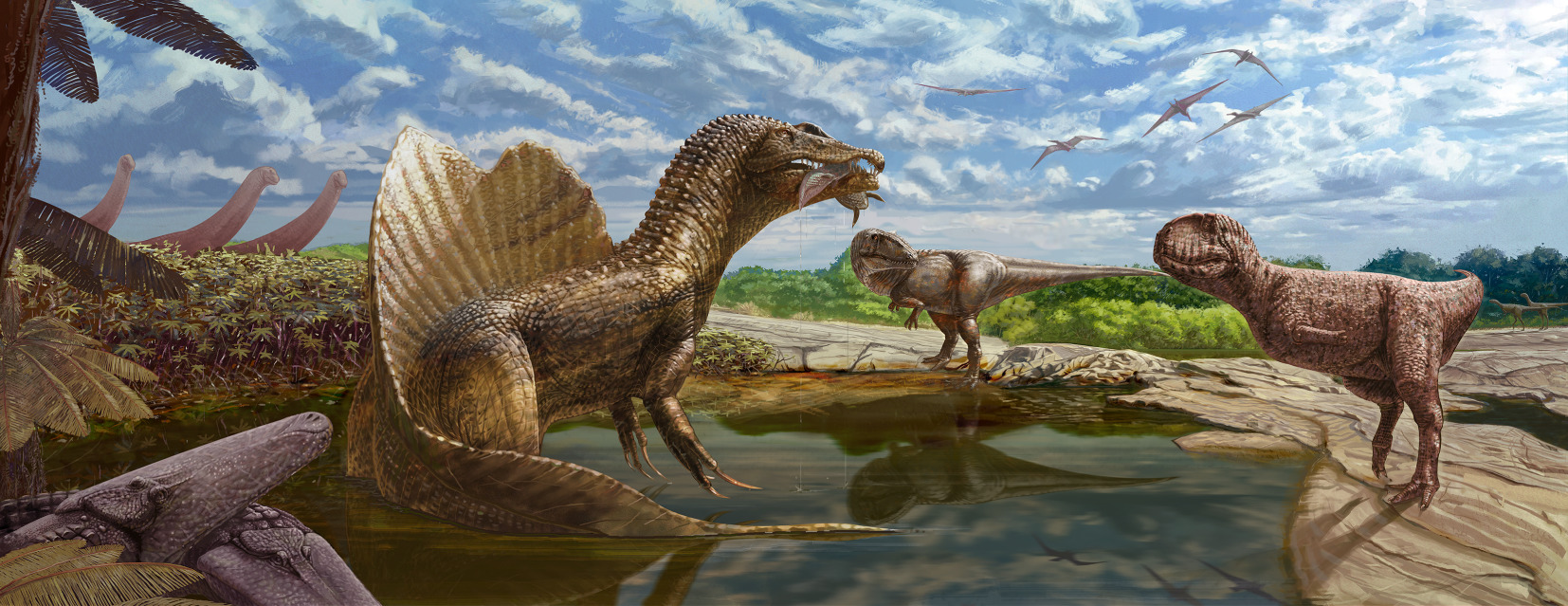
Reconstruction of the palaeoecosystem of the Bahariya Formation

North Africa, during the Cenomanian stage of the Late Cretaceous, bordered the Tethys Sea, and was a mangrove-dominated coastal environment filled with vast tidal flats and waterways. While earlier, Albian-aged plethodids exclusively resided in Europe, the family expanded into the Tethys Sea during the Cenomanian-Turonian transition. Fossils of terrestrial and freshwater animals, including those of Paranogmius, were largely found in a lower layer of the Bahariya Formation whereas those of marine animals like plesiosaurs are more common in upper layers of the formation, indicating a change in the environment to a marine depositional one. A diverse fauna of freshwater bony fishes is known from this formation, some of which reached great sizes, such as the bichir Bawitius, the lungfishes Neoceratodus and Ceratodus, and the coelccanth Mawsonia. Other freshwater bony fishes found include the pycnodontid Coelodus, the enchodontid Enchodus, and the lepidotid Lepidotes.

A diverse fauna of other animals is known from the Bahariya Formation. Underwater life diversity exploded during this period in the mangroves of North Africa, represented by genera like sawskates Onchopristis and Schizorhiza, sharks like Squalicorax and Cretolamna, and a variety of invertebrates. Non-dinosaurian reptiles such as the early sea snake Simoliophis, turtles like Apertotemporalis and an unnamed pelomedusid, several indeterminate plesiosaurs, crocodylomorphs like the stomatosuchid Stomatosuchus and the eunotosuchian Libycosuchus, and an indeterminate pterosaur are also known from the formation. Dinosaurs are represented by the sauropods Aegyptosaurus, Paralititan, and an indeterminate titanosaur, the theropods Spinosaurus, Tameryraptor, Bahariasaurus, an indeterminate abelisaurid, and possibly Sigilmassasaurus and Deltadromeus.
