= Pentanogmius =

Pentanogmius Temporal range: Cenomanian–Campanian
- Artist's impression of P. evolutus

Scientific classification
- Kingdom: Animalia
- Phylum: Chordata
- Class: Actinopterygii
- Division: Teleostei
- Order: †Tselfatiiformes
- Family: †Plethodidae
- Genus: †Pentanogmius; Taverne, 2000

Type species
- Pentanogmius pentagon (Woodward, 1899)

Species
- P. crieleyi (Applegate, 1970); P. evolutus (Cope, 1877); P. fritschi Shimada, 2016; P. furcatus (Fritsch, 1878); P. pentagon (Woodward, 1899)

Extinct genus of fishes

Pentanogmius is an extinct genus of sail-finned ray-finned fish that lived during the Late Cretaceous in what is now Europe and the United States. Five species are currently recognized, 2 from Cenomanian to Turonian Europe and 3 better known species from Coniacian to Campanian North America. The American species inhabited large areas of the Western Interior Seaway, with fossil finds indicating a range from Texas and Alabama in the south to Manitoba, Canada, in the north.

== History and naming ==
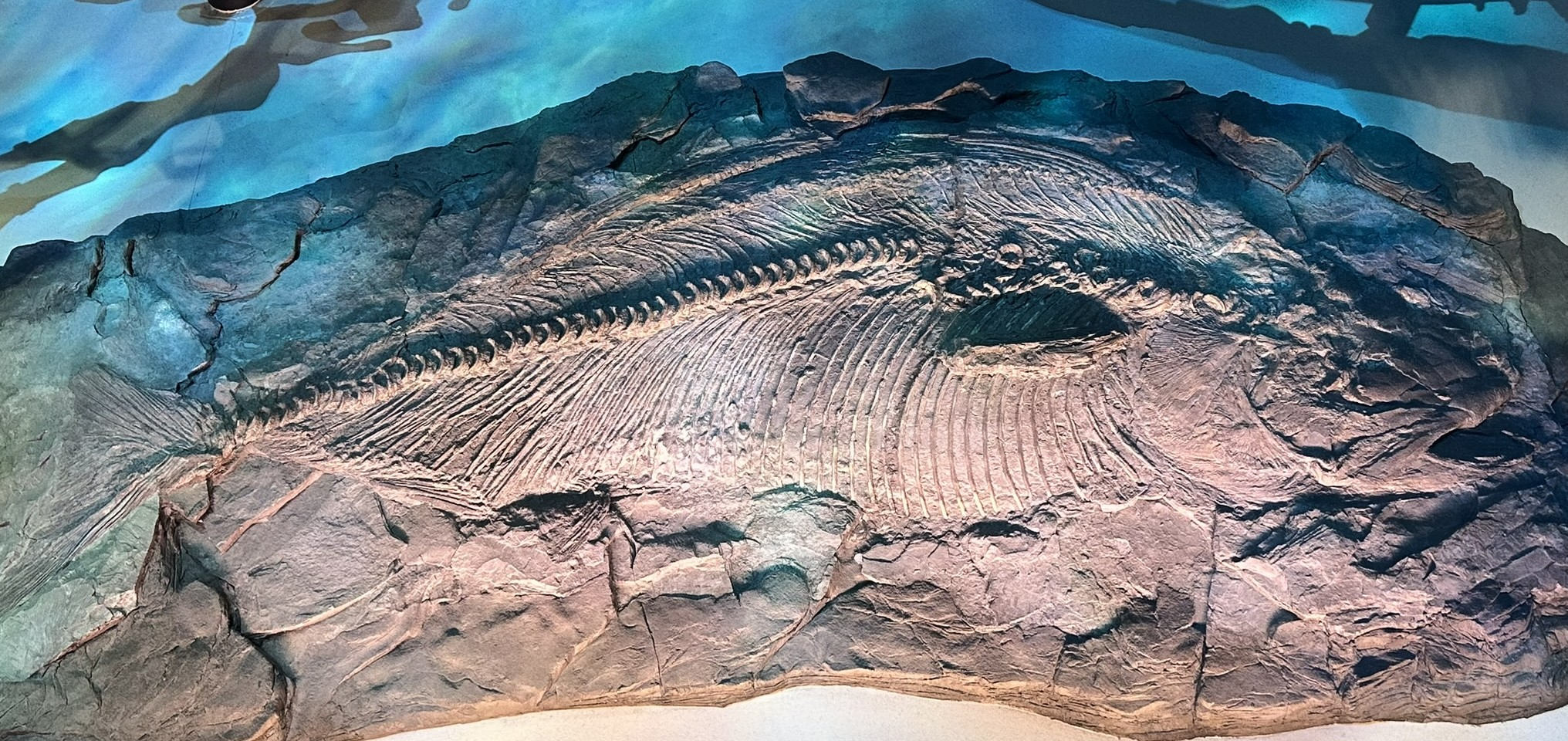
Fossil of P. fritschi, Perot Museum

The first remains that now fall under the name Pentanogmius were found in the English Lower Chalk and described in 1850 as Plethodus pentagon. In 1877 Edward Drinker Cope named Anogmius evolutus from a let mandibular ramus found in the Niobrara Formation of Kansas, taking note of its less curved morphology compared to the other Anogmius species known at the time. As Anogmius was preoccupied, the name was eventually changed to Ananogmius and then Bananogmius. Later, Bananogmius polymicrodus was declared a synonym of B. evolutus. Material previously referred to Osmeroides was also referred to Anogmius with notable similarities to B. evolutus, however the specimen in question was destroyed during the bombing of Munich in WW2. Over the years a lot of material has been referred to P. evolutus including several well preserved skeletons, making it both the most abundant and best understood members of its family.

Plethodus pentagon was revised in the year 2000, determined to be a distinct genus and named Pentanogmius and a year later Louis Taverne determined that both Bananogmius evolutus and Bananogmius crieleyi (named by Applegate in 1970) did not match the autapomorphies defining Bananogmius and must instead represent a different genus of plethodid fish. In follow-up publications, Taverne officially includes both "B." evolutus and "B." crieleyi in the genus Pentanogmius. P. furcatus represents a second European species from Bohemia and was originally discovered in 1878 by Antonin Fritsch. In 2009 Joseph Fritsch (unrelated to Antonin) and Kris Howe collected another specimen of Pentanogmius, put on display at the Perot Museum of Nature and Science. This specimen from the Britton Formation is the currently oldest known species of Pentanogmius and was described as Pentanogmius fritschi in 2016.

== Description ==
Members of Pentanogmius are stout plethodid fish with a fusiform morphology and a body depth of up to 40 cm (in P. evolutus). The skull is roughly triangular in shape with the skull roof being largely formed by the large frontal bones. The dentary is dorsoventrally relatively slender in P. fritschi and deeper with a noticeable "chin" in both P. crieleyi and P. evolutus. The tooth plate is broad and robust and overhangs the edges of the dentary. The individual teeth are villiform and minute, about 2 mm high, conical and strongly curved.

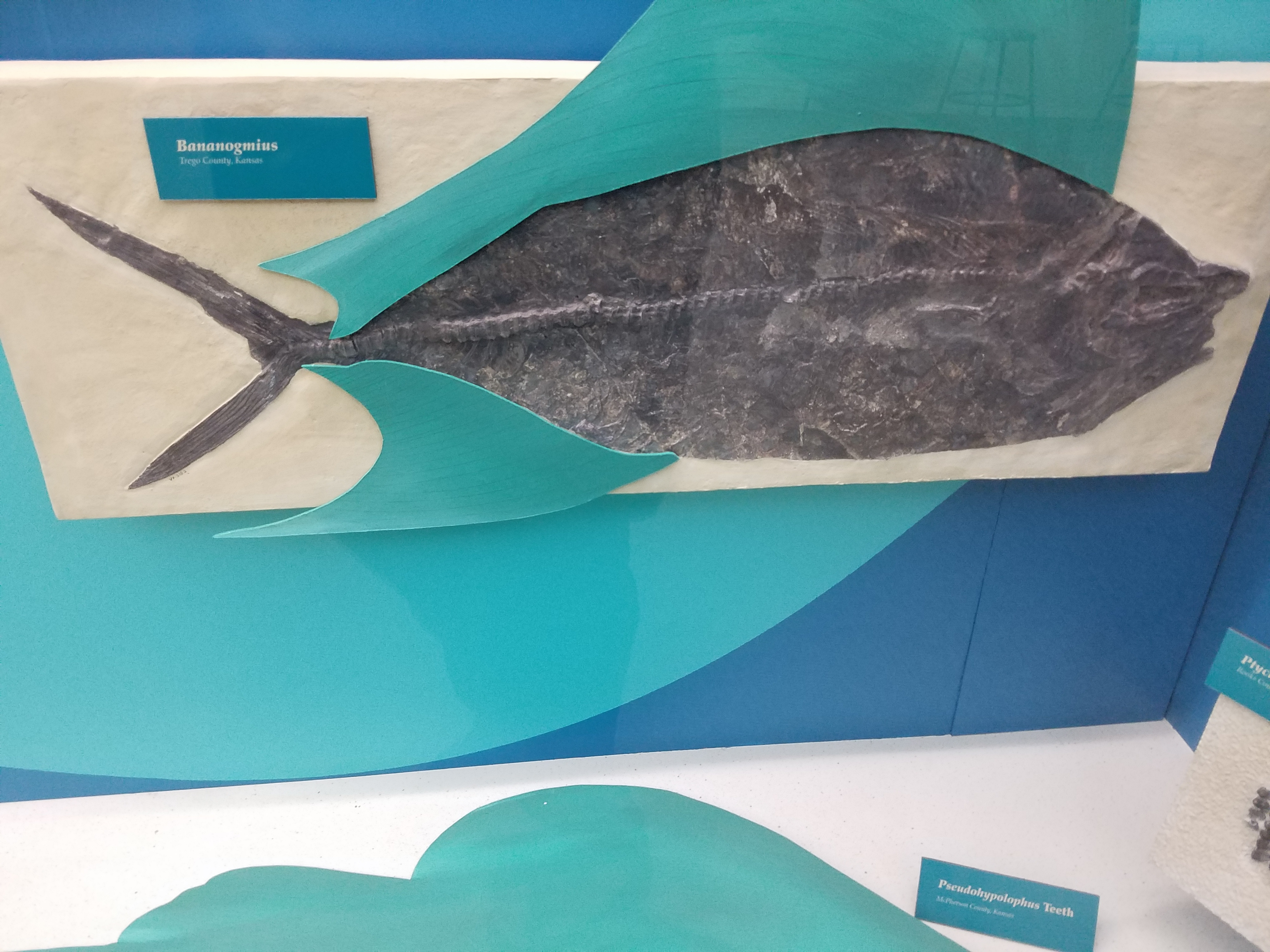
Pentanogmius evolutus fossil with an incorrectly restored dorsal fin

Like other plethodid fish, Pentanogmius had enlarged and high dorsal and anal fins. The dorsal fin starts just posterior to the skull and extends over most of the body until just before the deeply bifurcated caudal fin. In P. evolutus every fin ray posterior to the apex is slightly shorter than the one preceding it, giving it an dorsally straight, declining form before ending rather abruptly on the final fin ray. P. fritschi differs greatly from P. evolutus in the shape of the dorsal fin. While P. evolutus has a dorsal fin that gradually grows shorter the more posterior it is located, the one of P. fritschi is greatly elongated in the anterior third of the body, reaching a height of up to 75 cm. The dorsal fin decreases in height abruptly following its apex and stops much further anterior than in P. evolutus. This gives P. fritschi a hook-shaped sail, superficially similar to those seen in modern-day Marlin, Swordfish and the extinct Pachyrhizodus. Unlike Pachyrhizodus and billfish however, species of Pentanogmius possess small and weak pectoral fins located in a much more dorsal position on the body at around the same level as the orbits. The caudal fin is symmetrical and deeply forked in P. evolutus while more luniform in P. fritschi. The pelvic fins are small and located in the posterior half of the body, immediately followed by the anal fin. The anal fin in P. evolutus and P. fritschi mirror their respective species' dorsal fin, with the former's having a relatively straight edge and the later having an anal fin consisting of 6 clustered principal rods followed by 8 shorter fin rods.

Little can be said about the European species of Pentanogmius, as both P. pentagon and P. furcatus are poorly understood and were named from fragmentary remains. However, Taverna (2004) does show clear differences between the species based on the dermobasihyal morphology. This part of the anatomy could not be observed in P. fritschi, meaning that it cannot be ruled out that P. fritschi may be synonymous with either European species. However, Shimada argues that there is a high degree of endemism among the tselfatiiform species of the Western Interior Seaway, with no tselfatiiform species being currently known to have inhabited two continents.

Pentanogmius evolutus is among the largest known tselfatiiform fish, with NHM P. 10610 measuring 172 cm in standard length (snout to last vertebrae) and 198 cm in total length (snout to the tip of the larger caudal fin). Specimen NHM P. 9202 reaches a similarly enormous size with 118.5 cm from the muzzle to the beginning of the caudal region. Only the Egyptian Paranogmius exceeds it with a length of up to 3 meters. P. fritschi was likewise able to grow to respectable lengths, with the holotype specimen measuring around 170 cm in total length (137 cm standard length).

== Phylogeny ==
The exact internal relationships between members of Pentanogmius are difficult to determine due to the fragmentary nature of the European species and the limited skeletal material of P. crieleyi. Based on the available fossils, Kenshu Shimada suggests that P. crieleyi may have been the most derived of the three American species, nesting closely with P. evolutus based on shared cranial anatomy, in particular that of the maxilla and premaxilla, and stratigraphy. Depicted below is the hypothetical phylogenetic relationship between the American Pentanogmius species, as of Shimada (2016).

- - Pentanogmius fritschi
  - - Pentanogmius evolutus
    - Pentanogmius crieleyi

In a 2005 study Louis Taverne and Mireille Gayet recovered the following phylogenetic tree for tselfatiform fish. This phylogeny recovers Pentanogmius as a derived member of tselfatiiformes and nested deep within Plethodidae.

- - Tselfatiiformes
    - Protobramidae
      - Abisaadichthys
      - - Eusebichthys
        - Protobrama
    - - Eoplethodidae
        Eoplethodus
      - Plethodidae
        - Paranogmius
        - - - Bananogmius
            - - Luxilites
              - - Syntegmodus
                - Niobrara
          - - - Martinichthys
              - - Pseudothryptodus
                - - Thryptodus
                  - Plethodus
            - - Pseudanogmius
              - - Moorevillia
                - - Pentanogmius
                  - - Zanclites
                    - - Bachea
                      - - Enischnorhynchus
                        - - Tselfatia
                          - Dixonanogmius

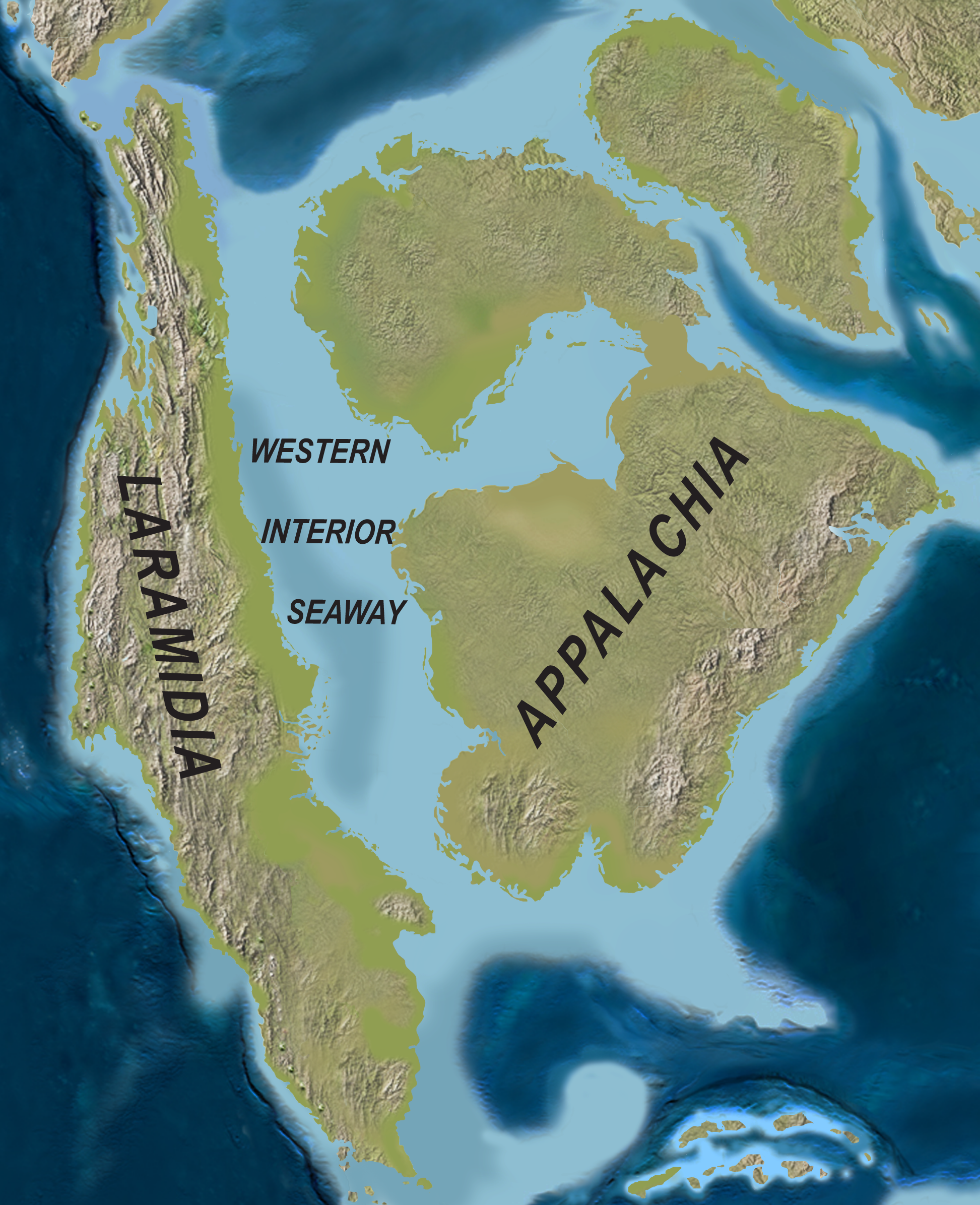
The Western Interior Seaway during the Campanian

== Paleobiology ==
The rocks, which P. fritschi was preserved in, suggest an off-shore environment from the Late Campanian to Early Turonian, a time at which the Western Interior Seaway covered a broad stretch of the modern United States. The area covered by water and its depth during this part of the Cretaceous suggests that P. fritschi was most likely an open ocean animal with some adaptations for an active fast-swimming pelagic lifestyle (fusiform body and luniform caudal fin). Although their exact morphology is unlike that of any extant fish, they most closely resemble billfish and scombrids such as tuna. Furthermore, much like billfish and many scombrids, Pentanogmius possessed many small teeth that would have allowed them to prey on relatively small pelagic fish, crustaceans and cephalopods. However, no currently known specimen of Pentanogmius preserves stomach contents.
