= Hesseltal Formation =

Geological formation in Germany

- Stratigraphic range: Late Cenomanian-Early Turonian
- Type: Geological formation
- Unit of: Planerkalk Group

Lithology
- Primary: Marl, limestone
- Other: Black shale

Location
- Country: Germany
- Extent: North Rhine-Westphalia; Lower Saxony

Type section
- Named by: Hiss, Kaplan & Wiese
- Year defined: 2007

The Hesseltal Formation or Blackcoloured Formation is a Late Cretaceous (late Cenomanian to early Turonian) geological formation from northern Germany. It consists of lithified marls and limestone, with a unique series of black shales deposited in anoxic conditions during the Cenomanian-Turonian boundary event.

It provides an important record of the fauna of the proto-North Sea basin. The formation's diversity of fossil fish is thought to be due to a consequence of an expanding oxygen minimum zone that caused mass mortalities among different communities of fish, including both those associated with warm surface waters and those associated with colder waters from upwelling. The anoxic conditions allowed for detailed preservation of some of these fish, including bony fish with their stomach contents preserved and even a few partial body fossils of cartilaginous fish. Fossil ammonites with preserved soft parts are also known.

The formation's deposition also documents the Plenus Cold Event, an enigmatic, brief but severe cooling event that occurred during the otherwise rapid global warming from the Cenomanian-Turonian boundary event, possibly as a consequence of changing ocean circulation.

== Paleobiota ==
Most fish are documented in Diedrich (2012) and a species list from Amalfitano et al (2020).

=== Bony fish ===
Genus	Species	Location	Material	Notes	Images
Apateodus	A. striatus			An ichthyotringid aulopiform.	
Armigatus	A. brevissimus			An ellimmichthyiform clupeomorph.	
Anomoeodus	A. angustus			A pycnodont.	
Anomoeodus	A. muensteri			A pycnodont.	
Aulolepis	A. typus			A ctenothrissiform.	
Apsopelix	A. anglicus			A crossognathid crossognathiform.	
Bananogmius	B. ornatus			A plethodid tselfatiiform. Preserved with Clupavus in the stomach.	
Belonostomus	B. cinctus			An aspidorhynchid.	
Cimolichthys	C. levesiensis			A cimolichthyid aulopiform.	
Clupavus	C. maroccanus			A basal ostariophysian. The most common fish of the formation.	
Cylindracanthus	C. cf. minor		Rostral fragment	A fish of uncertain affinities.	
Dercetis (=Leptotrachelus)	D. sp.			A dercetid aulopiform.	
?Dixonanogmius	D. sp.			A plethodid.	
Elopopsis	E. microdon			A pachyrhizodontid crossognathiform.	
Enchodus	E. lewesiensis			An enchodontid aulopiform.	
Enchodus	E. venator			An enchodontid aulopiform.	
Hoplopteryx	H. lewesiensis			A trachichthyiform.	
Ichthyodectes	I. sp.			An ichthyodectid.	
Ichthyotringa	I. africana			An ichthyotringid aulopiform.	
Njoerdichthys	N. dyckerhoffi	Galgenknapp Quarry, Hohne Quarry		A pycnodont.	
Osmeroides	O. lewesiensis			An osmeroidid elopiform.	
Pachyrhizodus	P. subulidens			A pachyrhizodontid crossognathiform.	
Pachyrhizodus	P. sp.			A pachyrhizodontid crossognathiform.	
Paranursallia	P. gutturosa			A pycnodont.	
Protosphyraena	P. sp.			A billfish-like pachycormid.	
"Pycnodus"	"P." scrobiculatus			A pycnodont.	
Rhamphoichthys	R. taxidiotis	DIMAC Quarry		A billfish-like plethodid.	
Rharbichthys	R. ferox			An aulopiform.	
Rhynchodercetis	R. sp.			A dercetid aulopiform.	
Protostomias	P. maroccanus			A dragonfish-like teleost.	
Tselfatia	T. formosa			A plethodid.	
Xiphactinus	X. sp.			An ichthyodectid.	

=== Chondrichthyans ===
Genus	Species	Location	Material	Notes	Images
Cantioscyllium	C. decipiens			A nurse shark.	
Carcharias	C. sp.			A sand shark.	
Chiloscyllium	C. greenei			A bamboo shark.	
Cretalamna	C. appendiculata			An otodontid shark.	
Cretascyliorhinus	C. aff. destombesi			A scyliorhinid shark.	
Cretodus	C. semiplicatus			A pseudoscapanorhynchid shark.	
Cretoxyrhina	C. denticulata			A cretoxyrhinid shark.	
Cretoxyrhina	C. mantelli			A cretoxyrhinid shark.	
Diprosopovenator	D. hilperti		Partial body fossils	A pseudoscyliorhinid shark (formerly Paraorthacodus sp.)	
?Eostriatolamia	?E. subulata			A sand shark.	
Heterodontus	H. caniculatus			A bullhead shark.	
Heterodontus	H. polydictyos			A bullhead shark.	
Paranomotodon	P. angustidens			A thresher shark.	
Protolamna	P. acuta			A pseudoscapanorhynchid shark.	
Protolamna	P. sokolovi			A pseudoscapanorhynchid shark.	
Pseudoscyliorhinus	P. schwarzhansi			A pseudoscyliorhinid shark	
Posadaia	P. nolfi			A sand shark.	
Pseudospinax	P. pusillus			A bamboo shark.	
Ptychodus	P. decurrens		Articulated specimen, teeth	A ptychodontid shark.	
Ptychodus	P. mammilaris		Articulated specimen, teeth	A ptychodontid shark.	
Polyacrodus	P. polyptychus			A hybodontid shark.	
Scapanorhynchus	S. raphiodon			A goblin shark.	
Squalicorax	S. falcatus			A crow shark.	
Squatina (Cretascyllium)	S. cranei			An angelshark.	
Squatirhina	S. westfalica			A ray of uncertain affinities.	
Turoniabatis	T. ornata			A ray of uncertain affinities.	

=== Reptiles ===
Genus	Species	Location	Material	Notes	Images
Coniasaurus	C. crassidens	DIMAC quarry	Dentary, teeth	A dolichosaurid squamate	
Dolichosaurus	D. longicollis	DIMAC quarry	Dorsal vertebra	A dolichosaurid squamate	
Mosasauroidea indet.		DIMAC quarry	Articulated tail	The oldest articulated mosasaur remains from Europe.	
