= Mooreville Chalk =

Geological formation in the United States of America

- Stratigraphic range: Upper Cretaceous
- Type: Geological formation
- Unit of: Selma Group
- Sub-units: Arcola Limestone Member
- Underlies: Demopolis Chalk Formation
- Overlies: Eutaw Formation

Lithology
- Primary: Chalk

Location
- Region: Alabama, Mississippi
- Country: United States

The Mooreville Chalk is a geological formation in North America, within the U.S. states of Alabama and Mississippi, which were part of the subcontinent of Appalachia. The strata date back to the early Santonian to the early Campanian stage of the Late Cretaceous. The chalk was formed by pelagic sediments deposited along the eastern edge of the Mississippi embayment. It is a unit of the Selma Group and consists of the upper Arcola Limestone Member and an unnamed lower member. Dinosaur, mosasaur, and primitive bird remains are among the fossils that have been recovered from the Mooreville Chalk Formation.

== Fish ==
=== Cartilaginous fish ===
Cartilaginous fish of the Mooreville Chalk Formation
Genus	Species	Location	Stratigraphic position	Abundance	Notes	Images
Cretolamna	C. appendiculata				A lamniform	Cretoxyrhina mantelli Squalicorax sp.
Cretoxyrhina	C. mantelli				A lamniform	Cretoxyrhina mantelli Squalicorax sp.
Edaphodon	E. barberi				Chimaeriforms	Cretoxyrhina mantelli Squalicorax sp.
Edaphodon	E. mirificus					Cretoxyrhina mantelli Squalicorax sp.
Ischyodus	I. williamsae				A chimaeriform	Cretoxyrhina mantelli Squalicorax sp.
Odontaspis	O. cuspidata				A lamniform	Cretoxyrhina mantelli Squalicorax sp.
Propenser	P. hewletti				Lamniformes	Cretoxyrhina mantelli Squalicorax sp.
Ptychodus	P. mammillaris				?Neoselachian incertae sedis	Cretoxyrhina mantelli Squalicorax sp.
Ptychodus	P. mortoni					Cretoxyrhina mantelli Squalicorax sp.
Ptychodus	P. polygyrus					Cretoxyrhina mantelli Squalicorax sp.
Pseudocorax	P. affinis				Lamniformes	Cretoxyrhina mantelli Squalicorax sp.
Pseudocorax	P. laevis					Cretoxyrhina mantelli Squalicorax sp.
Serratolamna	S. serrata				A lamniform	Cretoxyrhina mantelli Squalicorax sp.
Scapanorhynchus	S. rhaphiodon				Lamniformes	Cretoxyrhina mantelli Squalicorax sp.
Scapanorhynchus	S. texanus					Cretoxyrhina mantelli Squalicorax sp.
Squalicorax	S. falcatus				Lamniformes	Cretoxyrhina mantelli Squalicorax sp.
Squalicorax	S. kaupi					Cretoxyrhina mantelli Squalicorax sp.

=== Bony fish ===
Bony fish of the Mooreville Chalk Formation
Genus	Species	Location	Stratigraphic position	Abundance	Notes	Images
Albula	A. dunklei				An albuliform	Enchodus petrosus Saurodon leanus Xiphactinus audax
Bananogmius	B. crieleyi				A tselfatiiform	Enchodus petrosus Saurodon leanus Xiphactinus audax
Cimolichthys	C. nepaholica				An aulopiform	Enchodus petrosus Saurodon leanus Xiphactinus audax
Enchodus	E. petrosus				An aulopiform	Enchodus petrosus Saurodon leanus Xiphactinus audax
Enchodus	E. saevus				An aulopiform	Enchodus petrosus Saurodon leanus Xiphactinus audax
Hoplopteryx	Hoplopteryx sp.				A trachichthyiform	Enchodus petrosus Saurodon leanus Xiphactinus audax
Ichthyodectes	I. ctenodon				An ichthyodectiform	Enchodus petrosus Saurodon leanus Xiphactinus audax
Moorevillia	M. hardi				A tselfatiiform	Enchodus petrosus Saurodon leanus Xiphactinus audax
Pachyrhizodus	P. caninus				A crossognathiform	Enchodus petrosus Saurodon leanus Xiphactinus audax
Protosphyraena	P. gladius				A pachycormid	Enchodus petrosus Saurodon leanus Xiphactinus audax
Saurodon	S. leanus				An ichthyodectiform	Enchodus petrosus Saurodon leanus Xiphactinus audax
Stratodus	S. apicalis				An aulopiform	Enchodus petrosus Saurodon leanus Xiphactinus audax
Xiphactinus	X. audax				An ichthyodectiform	Enchodus petrosus Saurodon leanus Xiphactinus audax

== Reptiles ==
=== Dinosaurs ===
Indeterminate hadrosaurid, nodosaurid, dinosaur egg, and ornithomimosaur fossils are known from Mooreville Chalk outcrops in Alabama. The nodosaurid remains most likely belong to a new taxon.

Color key: Taxon / Reclassified taxon / Taxon falsely reported as present / Dubious taxon or junior synonym / Ichnotaxon / Ootaxon / Morphotaxon	Notes; Uncertain or tentative taxa are in small text; ~~crossed out~~ taxa are discredited.

Dinosaurs reported from the Mooreville Chalk Formation
Genus	Species	Location	Stratigraphic position	Material	Notes	Images
Angelinornis	A. antecessor				A. antecessor was originally described as Plegadornis antecessor, but the generic name Plegadornis was preoccupied, so the genus Angelinornis was erected to contain the species. It was later demonstrated that Angelinornis was a junior synonym of Ichthyornis, although the new combination I. antecessor was held to be valid for a while following the sinking of Angelinornis into Ichthyornis. Later the species would later be considered a junior synonym of the Ichthyornis type species, I. dispar.	Eotrachodon Ichthyornis dispar Saurornitholestes
Eotrachodon	E. orientalis	Alabama.			A hadrosaurid known from a nearly complete skeleton and nearly complete skull.	Eotrachodon Ichthyornis dispar Saurornitholestes
Halimornis	H. thompsoni	Alabama.		"Vertebrae and limb elements."	An enantiornithine	Eotrachodon Ichthyornis dispar Saurornitholestes
Ichthyornis	I. antecessor				The species I. antecessor was made the type species of the genus Angelinornis in 1962. Later, I. antecessor and Angelinornis were shown to be junior synonyms of the Ichthyornis type species, I. dispar	Eotrachodon Ichthyornis dispar Saurornitholestes
Ichthyornis	I. dispar	Alabama.			An ichthyornithine.	Eotrachodon Ichthyornis dispar Saurornitholestes
Lophorhothon	L. atopus	Alabama.			A primitive species of hadrosaurid known from only a few skull fragments.	Eotrachodon Ichthyornis dispar Saurornitholestes
Saurornitholestes	S. sp.				A dromaeosaurid.	Eotrachodon Ichthyornis dispar Saurornitholestes
Plegadornis	P. antecessor				The name Plegadornis antecessor was applied to a fossil believed to represent a new bird species, but the generic name Plegadornis was preoccupied, so the genus Angelinornis was erected to contain the "new" species. It was later demonstrated that Angelinornis was a junior synonym of Ichthyornis, although the new combination I. antecessor was held to be valid for a while following the sinking of Angelinornis into Ichthtyornis. Later the species would later be considered a junior synonym of the Ichthyornis type species, I. dispar.	Eotrachodon Ichthyornis dispar Saurornitholestes

=== Mosasaurs ===
Mosasaurs of the Mooreville Chalk Formation
Genus	Species	Location	Stratigraphic position	Abundance	Notes	Images
Clidastes	C. liodontus				Mosasaurines	Clidastes propython Eonatator sternbergii Globidens alabamaensis Platecarpus tympaniticus Selmasaurus russelli Tylosaurus proriger
Clidastes	C. "moorevillensis"					Clidastes propython Eonatator sternbergii Globidens alabamaensis Platecarpus tympaniticus Selmasaurus russelli Tylosaurus proriger
Clidastes	C. propython					Clidastes propython Eonatator sternbergii Globidens alabamaensis Platecarpus tympaniticus Selmasaurus russelli Tylosaurus proriger
Ectenosaurus	E. shannoni				A plioplatecarpine	Clidastes propython Eonatator sternbergii Globidens alabamaensis Platecarpus tympaniticus Selmasaurus russelli Tylosaurus proriger
Eonatator	E. sternbergi (sic)				A halisaurine E. sternbergii was formerly classified as Halisaurus sternbergii	Clidastes propython Eonatator sternbergii Globidens alabamaensis Platecarpus tympaniticus Selmasaurus russelli Tylosaurus proriger
Eonatator	E. zangerli					Clidastes propython Eonatator sternbergii Globidens alabamaensis Platecarpus tympaniticus Selmasaurus russelli Tylosaurus proriger
Globidens	G. alabamaensis				A mosasaurine	Clidastes propython Eonatator sternbergii Globidens alabamaensis Platecarpus tympaniticus Selmasaurus russelli Tylosaurus proriger
Mosasaurus	M. missouriensis				A mosasaurine	Clidastes propython Eonatator sternbergii Globidens alabamaensis Platecarpus tympaniticus Selmasaurus russelli Tylosaurus proriger
Platecarpus	P. tympaniticus				A plioplatecarpine	Clidastes propython Eonatator sternbergii Globidens alabamaensis Platecarpus tympaniticus Selmasaurus russelli Tylosaurus proriger
Prognathodon	P. rapax				A mosasaurine	Clidastes propython Eonatator sternbergii Globidens alabamaensis Platecarpus tympaniticus Selmasaurus russelli Tylosaurus proriger
Selmasaurus	S. russelli				A plioplatecarpine	Clidastes propython Eonatator sternbergii Globidens alabamaensis Platecarpus tympaniticus Selmasaurus russelli Tylosaurus proriger
Tylosaurus	T. proriger				A tylosaurine	Clidastes propython Eonatator sternbergii Globidens alabamaensis Platecarpus tympaniticus Selmasaurus russelli Tylosaurus proriger

=== Plesiosaurs ===
Very rare elasmosaurs are present in this formation.

Plesiosaurs of the Mooreville Chalk Formation
Genus	Species	Location	Stratigraphic position	Abundance	Notes	Images
Trinacromerum	Trinacromerum sp.				Polycotylids	Trinacromerum sp.
Polycotylus	Polycotylus latipinnis	Alabama			Polycotylids	Trinacromerum sp.

=== Pterosaurs ===
Pterosaurs of the Mooreville Chalk Formation
Genus	Species	Location	Stratigraphic position	Abundance	Notes	Images
Pteranodon	Pteranodon sp.				Pteranodontids.	Pteranodon sp.

=== Turtles ===
Turtles of the Mooreville Chalk Formation
Genus	Species	Location	Stratigraphic position	Abundance	Notes	Images
Bothremys	B. barberi				A pelomedusid.	Protostega gigas
Corsochelys	C. haliniches				A dermochelyid.	Protostega gigas
Protostega	P. gigas				A protostegid.	Protostega gigas
Toxochelys	T. moorevillensis				A toxochelyid.	Protostega gigas

== See also ==
- List of dinosaur-bearing rock formations
- List of fossil sites
