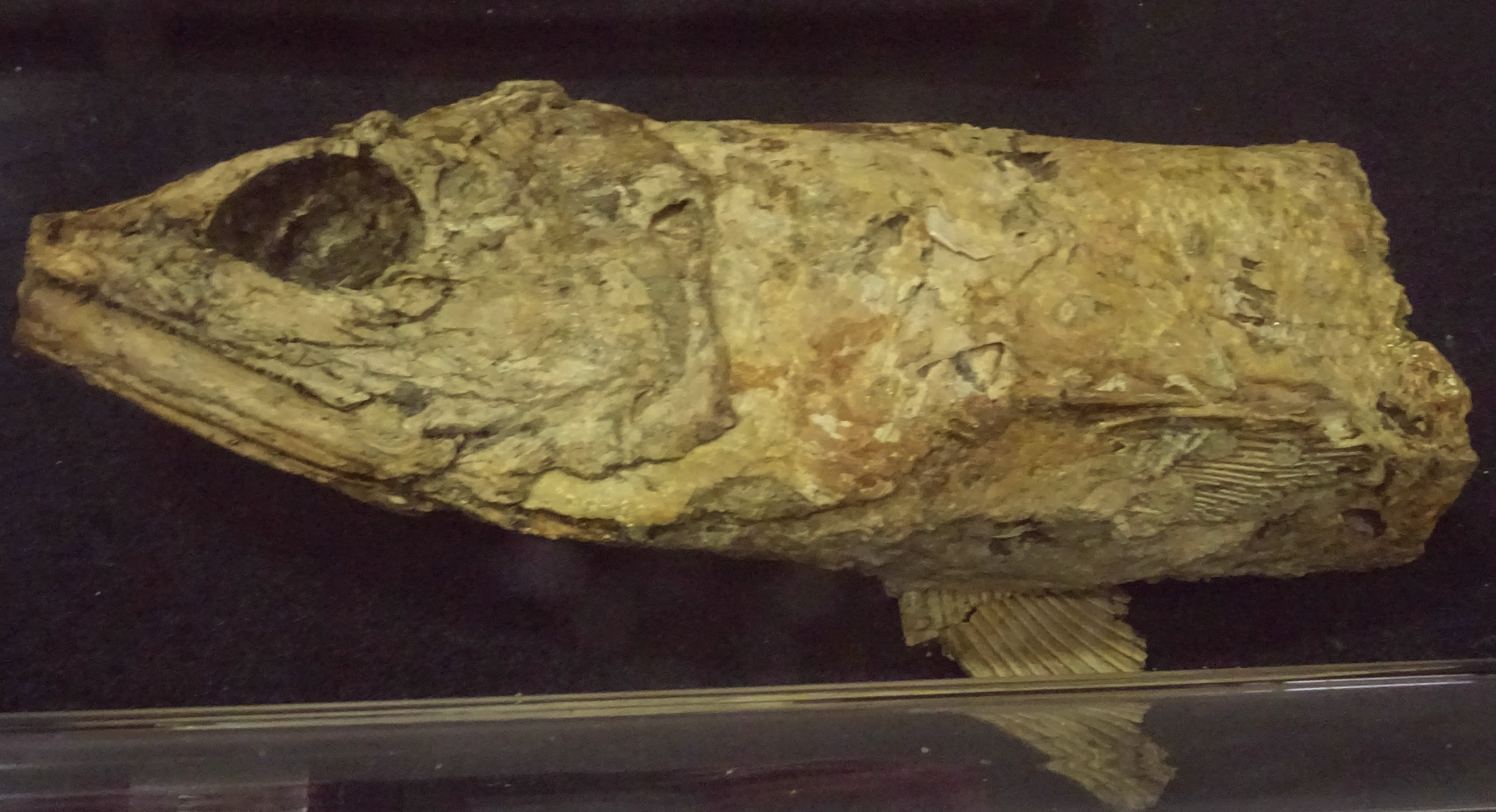
- Goulmimichthys gasparini from La Frontera Formation, Colombia

Scientific classification
- Kingdom: Animalia
- Phylum: Chordata
- Class: Actinopterygii
- Division: Teleostei
- Order: †Crossognathiformes
- Family: †Pachyrhizodontidae
- Genus: †Goulmimichthys; Cavin, 1995

Species
- †G. arambourgi Cavin, 1995 (type); †G. gasparini Páramo, 2001; †G. roberti Blanco & Cavin, 2003

= Goulmimichthys =

Goulmimichthys Temporal range: Turonian ~93–90 Ma

Extinct genus of ray-finned fishes

Goulmimichthys is an extinct genus of ray-finned fishes in the family Pachyrhizodontidae. The genus, first described by Cavin in 1995, is known from various Turonian age formations. The type species G. arambourgi from the Akrabou Formation in the El Rachidia Province of Morocco, and other fossils described are G. gasparini of the La Frontera Formation, Colombia, and G. roberti from the Agua Nueva Formation of Mexico.

== Etymology ==
The genus name Goulmimichthys is a combination of the Greek ichthys, "fish" and Goulmima, the city in Morocco where the holotype fossils were found. The species epithet of the type species arambourgi refers to Camille Arambourg, a French paleontologist who worked in North Africa. The species epithet gasparini, given by María Páramo, honours Argentinian paleontologist Zulma Gasparini.

== Description ==
The anterior process of the pelvic bone of Goulmimichthys has the same length as the four central abdominal vertebrae, a typical characteristic of the genus. The species G. roberti is known from disarticulated and articulated specimens.

== Distribution and habitat ==
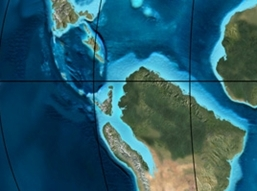
Paleogeography of the Turonian
G. arambourgi
G. gasparini
G. roberti

Fossils of the type species of Goulmimichthys have been described from the Lower Turonian Akrabou Formation near Goulmima in eastern Morocco. Other species are described from the Turonian La Frontera Formation near Yaguará, Huila, in the Eastern Ranges of the Colombian Andes, and the Agua Nueva Formation of the Lagerstätte Vallecillo in northeastern Mexico.

The fossil fishes were found in associations with other fossil genera, as in Mexico Nursallia gutturosum, Rhynchodercetis regio, Tselfatia formosa, Vallecillichthys multivertebratum, in Morocco Ghrisichthys and Enchodus, and in Colombia Pachyrhizodus etayoi and Bachea huilensis. Alongside the fossil fish assemblages, the fossils of plesiosaurs as Mauriciosaurus fernandezi and Vallecillosaurus donrobertoi in Mexico, the mosasaur Yaguarasaurus columbianus in Colombia and the basal mosasaur Tethysaurus nopcsai and turtles in Morocco were recovered.
