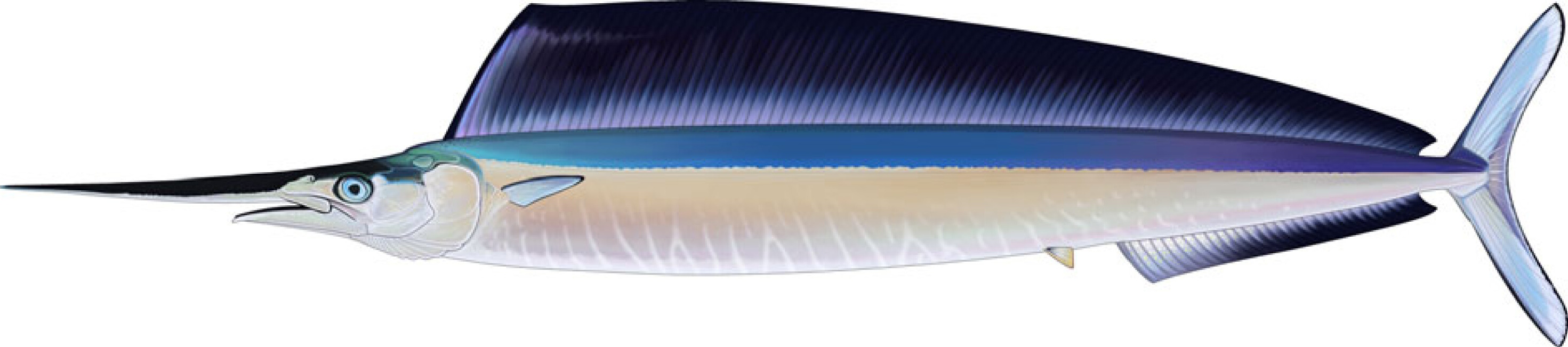
- Life restoration of R. taxidiotis

Scientific classification
- Kingdom: Animalia
- Phylum: Chordata
- Class: Actinopterygii
- Order: †Tselfatiiformes
- Family: †Plethodidae
- Genus: †Rhamphoichthys; Hossny, Cavin, Kaplan, Schwermann, Samankassou & Friedman, 2023

Type species
- †Rhamphoichthys taxidiotis Hossny et al, 2023

Species
- R. taxidiotis Hossny et al, 2023; "R. stebbingi" (Woodward, 1909); "R. minor" (Agassiz, 1844)

= Rhamphoichthys =

Rhamphoichthys Temporal range: Upper Cenomanian, 95–93.5 Ma

Extinct genus of billfish-like plethodid ray-finned fish

Rhamphoichthys is an extinct genus of billfish-like plethodid ray-finned fish from Late Cretaceous (Cenomanian). It contains one valid species, R. taxidiotis from the Hesseltal Formation of Germany and the Sannine Formation of Lebanon, in addition to two dubious species (R. minor from England and R. stebbingi from England & Italy) that are considered nomina nuda due to their fragmentary nature.

Rhamphoichthys was a large, streamlined tselfatiiform fish with an elongated rostrum, akin to those of modern billfish and the co-occurring pachycormid fish Protosphyraena; the English and Italian species are only known from rostral fragments that were previously assigned to Protosphyraena. It is one of the few longirostrine tselfatiiforms known, alongside the more fragmentary Martinichthys from North America. Rhamphoichthys rostra can be differentiated from those of Protosphyraena by being composed of paired bones as opposed to the single "rostrodermethmoid" bone that comprises pachycormid rostra. Much like billfishes, Protosphyraena had an upper jaw longer than the lower jaw and a high, long dorsal fin. However, unlike billfishes, it had a high pectoral fin and large scales on its body.

Rhamphoichthys appears to have been a widespread and common apex predator in the Tethys and Boreal seas. It likely had a very similar ecological role and feeding habits to modern billfishes.
