= Clupavus =

Clupavus Temporal range: Aptian to earliest Turonian

Scientific classification
- Kingdom: Animalia
- Phylum: Chordata
- Class: Actinopterygii
- (unranked): Otophysi
- Family: †Clupavidae
- Genus: †Clupavus; Arambourg, 1950

Type species
- †Clupavus maroccanus Arambourg, 1968

Species
- †C. brasiliensis Santos, 1985; †C. maroccanus Arambourg, 1968

Extinct genus of ray-finned fishes

Clupavus is an extinct genus of marine ray-finned fish that lived during the middle of the Cretaceous period. It is known from North Africa, Europe, Brazil, India and possibly North America.

== Taxonomy ==
It contains the following species:

- †C. brasiliensis Santos, 1985 - Aptian of Bahia, Brazil (Marizal Formation)
- †C. maroccanus Arambourg, 1968 - Cenomanian of Morocco (Jbel Tselfat), late Cenomanian/early Turonian of Germany (Hesseltal Formation) (=Clupavus neocomiensis Arambourg, 1950)

Fossils of an indeterminate Clupavus species are abundant in the Albian-aged Pietraroja Plattenkalk of Italy, and the Cenomanian-aged Komen Limestone of Slovenia. A few specimens of a potential indeterminate species are also known from the Albian-aged Mowry Shale of Wyoming, USA. A fossil specimen tentatively classified as C. cf. neocomiensis is known from the Aptian-Albian Raghavapuram Formation of Andhra Pradesh, India.

The genus was initially described in 1950 with the species C. neocomiensis (Bassani, 1879) as its type species, based on a specimen from Morocco classified C. cf. neocomiensis. In 1968, the original C. neocomiensis was found to be synonymous with Leptolepis brodiei, so Clupavus was redefined with the newly-described C. maroccanus as the type species. The classification of C. brasiliensis in this genus has been questioned, as it differs from C. maroccanus in the morphology of the caudal skeleton. The species Casieroides yamangaensis and Chardonius longicaudatus from the Democratic Republic of the Congo were initially classified in this genus, but are now known to be unrelated.

Initially described as a member of the Clupeiformes, later studies have found the presence of a Weberian apparatus in members of this genus, indicating them to be basal otophysans. Relatives of Clupavus include Lusitanichthys and possibly Jhingrania.

== Ecology ==
Clupavus is one of the most common fossil fishes in the formations where it occurs in Europe. They are especially common in the Hesseltal Formation of Germany, from around the Cenomanian-Turonian boundary. These German fossils indicate that Clupavus was a widespread, sardine-like shoaling fish, closely associated with cool waters from upwelling, that served as the base of the food chain in marine ecosystems of the Tethys Sea and pre-North Sea. Remains of Clupavus have been found as the fossilized stomach contents of medium-sized predatory fishes such as Bananogmius ornatus and possibly Protostomias maroccanus.
