= Enischnorhynchus =

Enischnorhynchus Temporal range: Late Santonian/Early Campanian

Scientific classification
- Kingdom: Animalia
- Phylum: Chordata
- Class: Actinopterygii
- Order: †Tselfatiiformes
- Family: †Plethodidae
- Genus: †Enischnorhynchus; Bardack, 1965
- Species: †E. dallasensis

Binomial name
- †Enischnorhynchus dallasensis Bardack, 1965

Extinct genus of fishes

Enischorhynchus (Greek for "slender snout") is an extinct genus of prehistoric marine ray-finned fish that lived during the Late Cretaceous. It contains a single species, E. dallasensis from the late Santonian or early Campanian-aged Austin Formation of southern Texas, USA. It was a member of the Plethodidae, a dominant family of nektonic fish during the mid-late Cretaceous. It shows close morphological similarities and may be related to Concavotectum and Bachea. It was likely an endemic of the southern Western Interior Seaway.

== See also ==
- Prehistoric fish
- List of prehistoric bony fish
