= Zanclites =

Zanclites Temporal range: Santonian

Scientific classification
- Kingdom: Animalia
- Phylum: Chordata
- Class: Actinopterygii
- Order: †Tselfatiiformes
- Family: †Plethodidae
- Genus: †Zanclites; Jordan, 1924

Species
- Zanclites xenerus Jordan, 1924

Extinct genus of fishes

Zanclites is an extinct genus of prehistoric ray-finned fish.

== Classification ==
Zanclites is a member of the Tselfatiiformes, a group of fish typical of the Cretaceous period and usually endowed with large dorsal fins. In particular, Zanclites would appear to have been a member of the Plethodidae family. Zanclites xenurus was first described by Jordan in 1924, based on a well-preserved fossil from the Niobrara Formation in Kansas (United States). Other fish belonging to the same family found in the same formation are Niobrara and Pentanogmius.
