= Casieroides =

Casieroides Temporal range: Early Albian

Scientific classification
- Kingdom: Animalia
- Phylum: Chordata
- Class: Actinopterygii
- Division: Teleostei
- Superorder: Protacanthopterygii (?)
- Genus: †Casieroides; Taverne, 1975
- Species: †C. yamangaensis

Binomial name
- †Casieroides yamangaensis (Casier, 1961)

Synonyms
- †Clupavus yamangaensis Casier, 1961

Extinct genus of fishes

Casieroides is an extinct genus of prehistoric freshwater ray-finned fish. It contains a single species, C. yamangaensis from the Early Cretaceous Loia Formation of the Democratic Republic of the Congo.

Its taxonomic identity is uncertain, as it has alternatively been classified as a "clupeoid", a pattersonellid, or a salmoniform. The latter classification is now thought to be a wastebasket treatment.

== See also ==
- Prehistoric fish
- List of prehistoric bony fish
