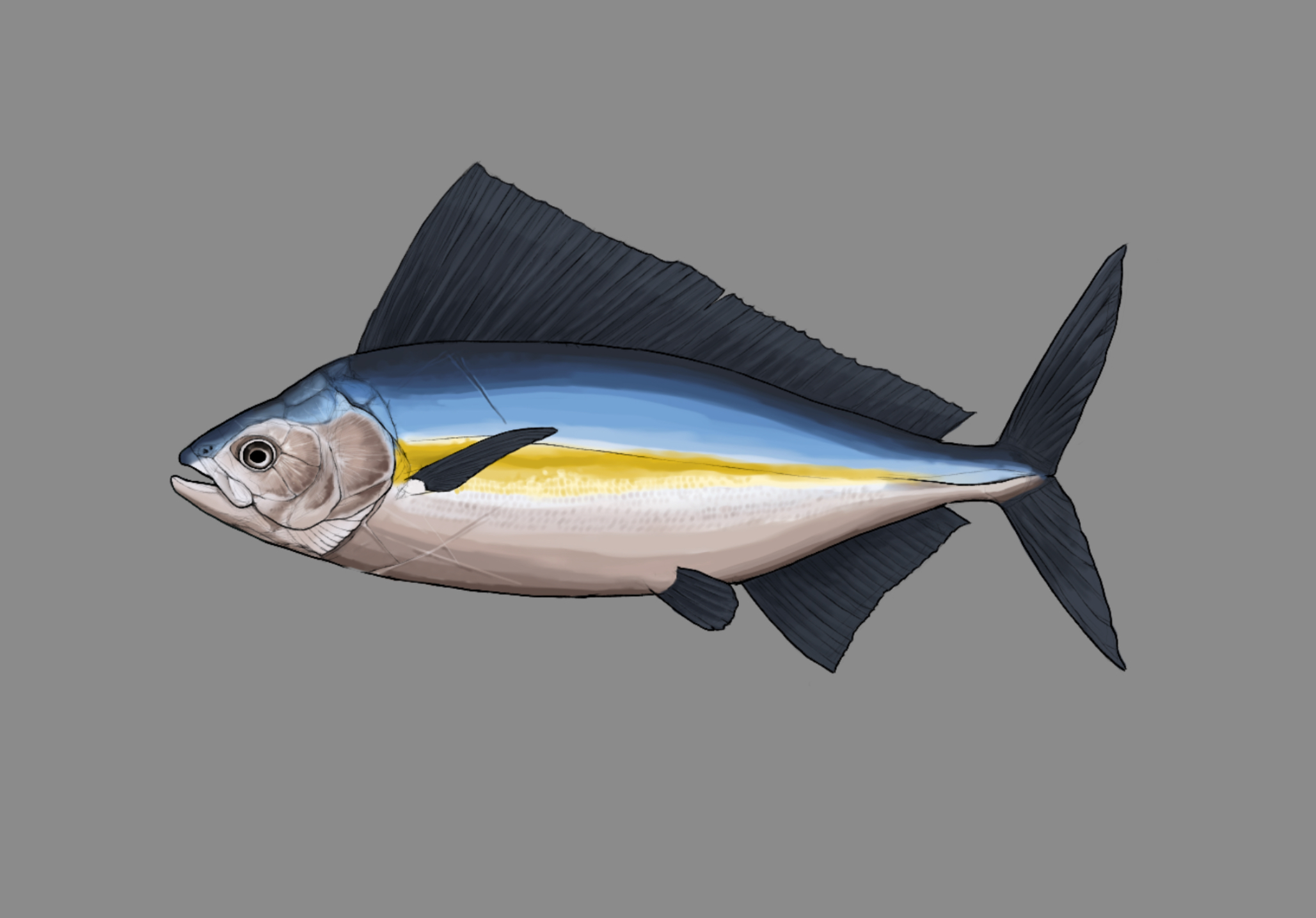
- Artist's impression of B. aratus

Scientific classification
- Kingdom: Animalia
- Phylum: Chordata
- Class: Actinopterygii
- Division: Teleostei
- Order: †Tselfatiiformes
- Family: †Plethodidae
- Genus: †Bananogmius; Whitley, 1940

Type species
- †Anogmius aratus Cope, 1877

Species
- †B. aratus (Cope, 1877); †B. ellisensis (Cope, 1877); †B. favirostris Fielitz & Shimada, 1999; †B. ornatus (Woodward, 1923)

Synonyms
- †Anogmius Cope, 1871; †Ananogmius White & Moy-Thomas, 1940

= Bananogmius =

Bananogmius Temporal range: Cenomanian to Santonian Possible Albian record

Extinct genus of fishes

Bananogmius is an extinct genus of marine ray-finned fish that was found in what is now North America and Europe during the Late Cretaceous, from the Cenomanian to the Santonian. It lived in the Western Interior Seaway, which split North America in two during the Late Cretaceous, as well as the proto-North Sea of Europe.

== Taxonomy ==
The original name for this genus was Anogmius Cope, 1871, which was described with the type species A. contractus. Shortly afterwards, Cope synonymized the genus with Pachyrhizodus, only to revive it in 1877 for species such as A. aratus, A. favirostris, and A. evolutus. Cope's synonymy of this genus with Pachyrhizodus was variously accepted or rejected for several decades, until 1940 when the new genus Bananogmius was proposed to contain all members of Anogmius aside from the type species, which was assumed to be a synonym of Pachyrhizodus. Further analysis of Cope's description of the original Anogmius contractus confirms that it was a plethodid and not a pachyrhizodontid, but this specimen was too fragmentary for a proper diagnosis and is now lost, leaving Bananogmius as the valid name.

The following species are known:

- †B. aratus (Cope, 1877) - Turonian to Santonian of the Niobrara Chalk in Kansas, USA (type species) (=Anogmius aratus Cope, 1877)
- †B. favirostris (Cope, 1877) - Turonian to Santonian of the Niobrara Chalk in Kansas, USA (=Anogmius favirostris Cope, 1877)
- †B. ellisensis Fielitz & Shimada, 1999 - Turonian of the Carlile Shale in Kansas, USA
- †B. ornatus (Woodward, 1923) - Cenomanian of England (Chalk Group), Cenomanian/Turonian of Germany (Hesseltal Formation) (=Anogmius ornatus Woodward, 1923)

Specimens are known from the Turonian and possibly the Albian (Tlayúa Formation) of Mexico, although these have not yet been described. Some species formerly placed in this genus, such as B. evolutus Cope, 1877 and B. crieleyi Applegate, 1970 were later reclassified as Pentanogmius.

== Description ==
As with many plethodids, Bananogmius had a thin body reminiscent of the modern angelfish, dozens of small teeth, and a high dorsal fin.

== Ecology ==
Bananogmius appears to have been a medium-sized predator that swallowed its prey headfirst. A fossil of B. ornatus from Germany from around the Cenomanian-Turonian boundary is preserved with the skeletons of the small schooling fish Clupavus in its stomach. This fish also has crushing teeth, indicating that it may have preyed upon marine mollusks.
