= Martinichthys =

Martinichthys Temporal range: Coniacian, 87 Ma

Scientific classification
- Kingdom: Animalia
- Phylum: Chordata
- Class: Actinopterygii
- Order: †Tselfatiiformes
- Family: †Plethodidae
- Genus: †Martinichthys; McClung, 1926

Species
- M. brevis McClung, 1926; M. ziphioides (Cope, 1877)

Extinct genus of fishes

Martinichthys is an extinct genus of plethodid fish from the Cretaceous of North America. It is known from the Niobrara Chalk, in which it is exceedingly rare. It is named after one H. T. Martin, who collected the most complete specimen at the time of description.

Two species are known, the short-snouted M. brevis and the long-snouted M. ziphioides; multiple other species previously described have been synonymized with M. ziphioides. With its long rostrum, the genus shows notable morphological convergence with modern billfish and the co-occurring pachycormid fish Protosphyraena, although not to the extent of its close relative, Rhamphoichthys.
