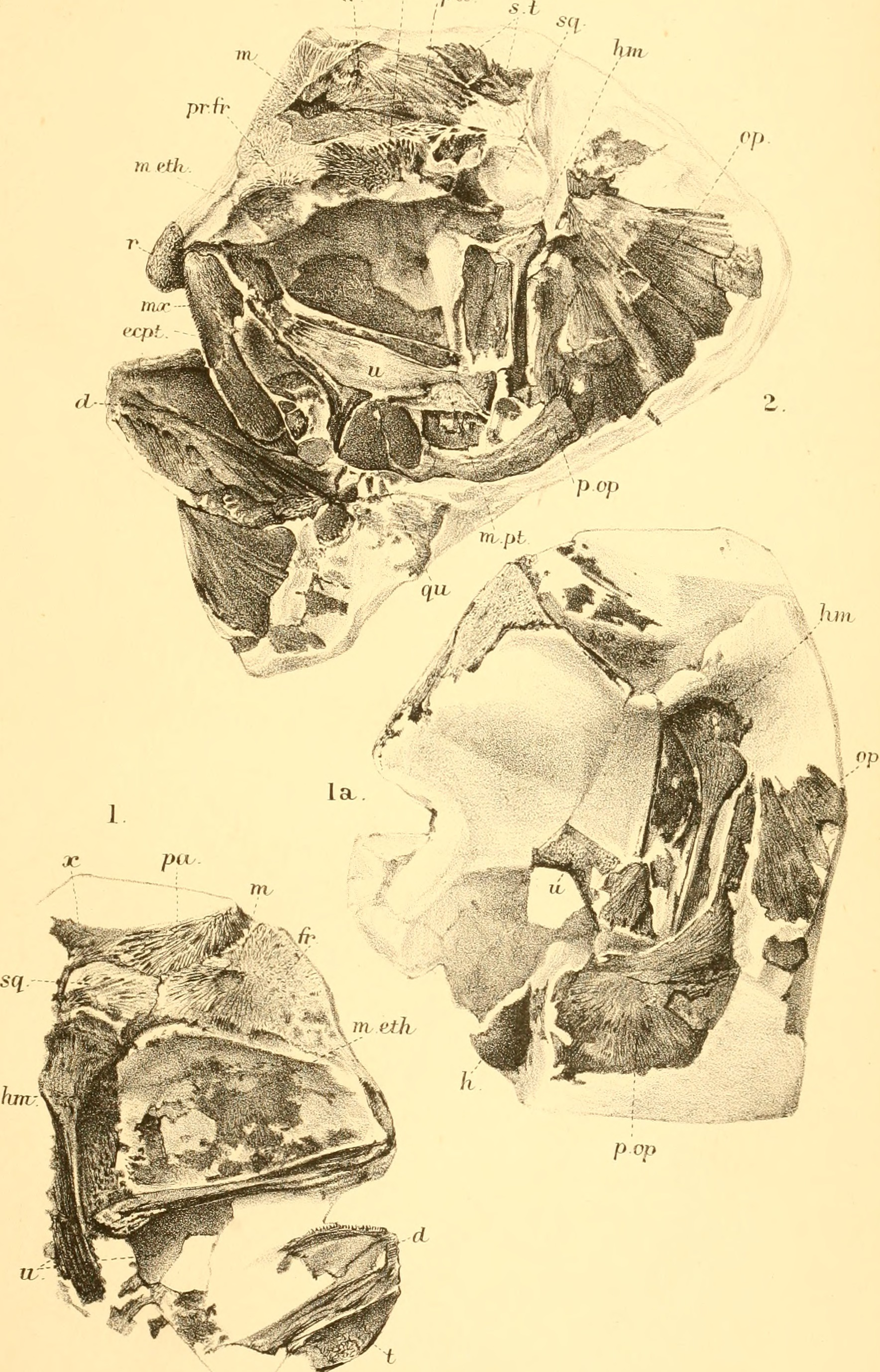

Scientific classification
- Kingdom: Animalia
- Phylum: Chordata
- Class: Actinopterygii
- Order: †Tselfatiiformes
- Family: †Plethodidae
- Genus: †Plethodus; Dixon, 1850

Species
- P. expansus Dixon, 1850; P. libycus Weiler, 1935; P. oblongus Dixon, 1850; P. pentagon Woodward, 1899; P. tibniensis Schaal, 1984

= Plethodus =

Plethodus Temporal range: Cenomanian

Extinct genus of fishes

Plethodus is an extinct genus of prehistoric ray-finned fish. It is the type genus of the family Plethodidae.

Fossils are known from Cenomanian aged deposits in Europe, Egypt, and Texas.
