= Moorevillia =

Moorevillia Temporal range: Campanian

Scientific classification
- Domain: Eukaryota
- Kingdom: Animalia
- Phylum: Chordata
- Class: Actinopterygii
- Order: †Tselfatiiformes
- Family: †Plethodidae
- Genus: †Moorevillia; Applegate, 1970
- Species: †M. hardi

Binomial name
- †Moorevillia hardi Applegate, 1970

Extinct genus of fishes

Moorevillia is an extinct genus of prehistoric bony fish that lived during the Campanian. It is known from the Mooreville Chalk Formation of Alabama.
