= Syntegmodus =

Syntegmodus Temporal range: Coniacian

Scientific classification
- Domain: Eukaryota
- Kingdom: Animalia
- Phylum: Chordata
- Class: Actinopterygii
- Order: †Tselfatiiformes
- Family: †Plethodidae
- Genus: †Syntegmodus; Loomis, 1900
- Species: †S. altus

Binomial name
- †Syntegmodus altus Loomis, 1900

Extinct genus of fishes

Syntegmodus is an extinct genus of prehistoric bony fish. It is known from the Niobrara Formation of Kansas.

== See also ==
- Prehistoric fish
- List of prehistoric bony fish
