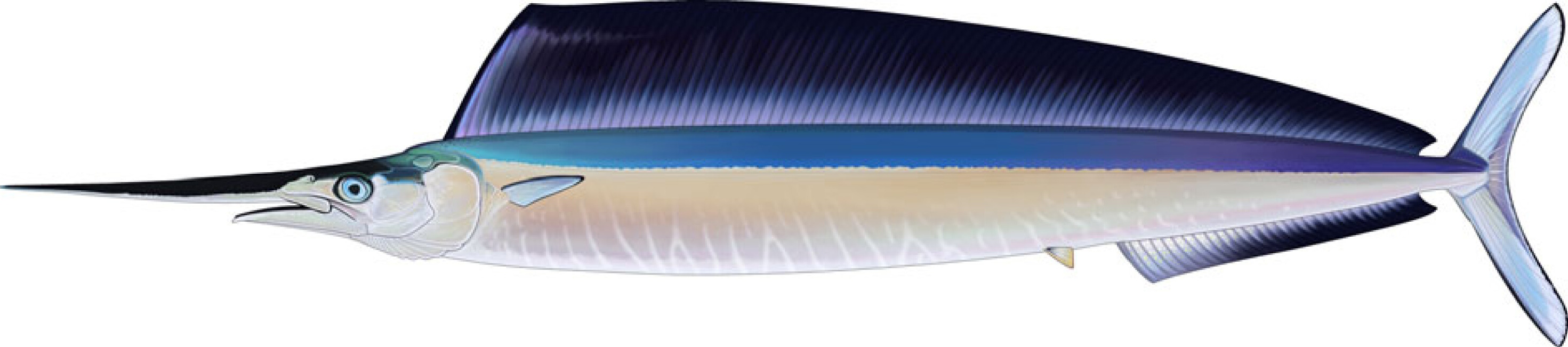
- Rhamphoichthys taxidiotis reconstruction

Scientific classification
- Kingdom: Animalia
- Phylum: Chordata
- Class: Actinopterygii
- Order: †Tselfatiiformes
- Family: †Plethodidae; Loomis, 1900

Genera
- Refer to § Genera

Synonyms
- Bananogmiidae; Niobraridae; Thryptodontidae; Tselfatiidae

= Plethodidae =

Plethodidae Temporal range: Late Cretaceous, Albian–Maastrichtian
- Pentanogmius evolutus reconstruction

Extinct family of ray-finned fishes

Plethodidae is an extinct family of teleost fish that existed during the Late Cretaceous period. Fossils are known from North America, North Africa, and Europe.

== Description ==
Plethodids possessed thin, angelfish-like bodies and often had high dorsal fins which made them distinctive from other types of fish. Their skeletons were partially cartilaginous, though the amount varied from one species to another.

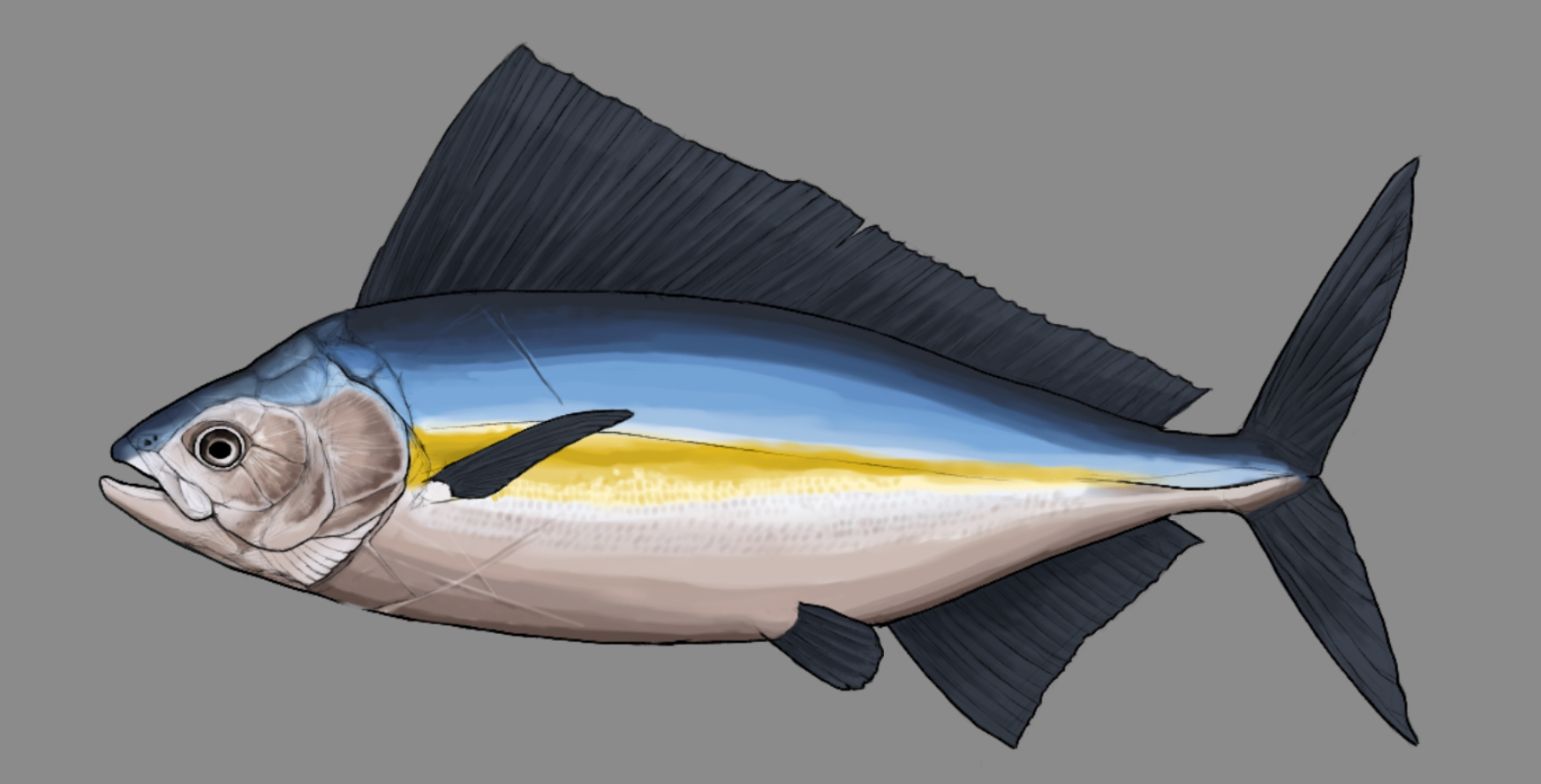
Bananogmius aratus

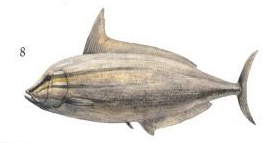
Paranogmius doederleini

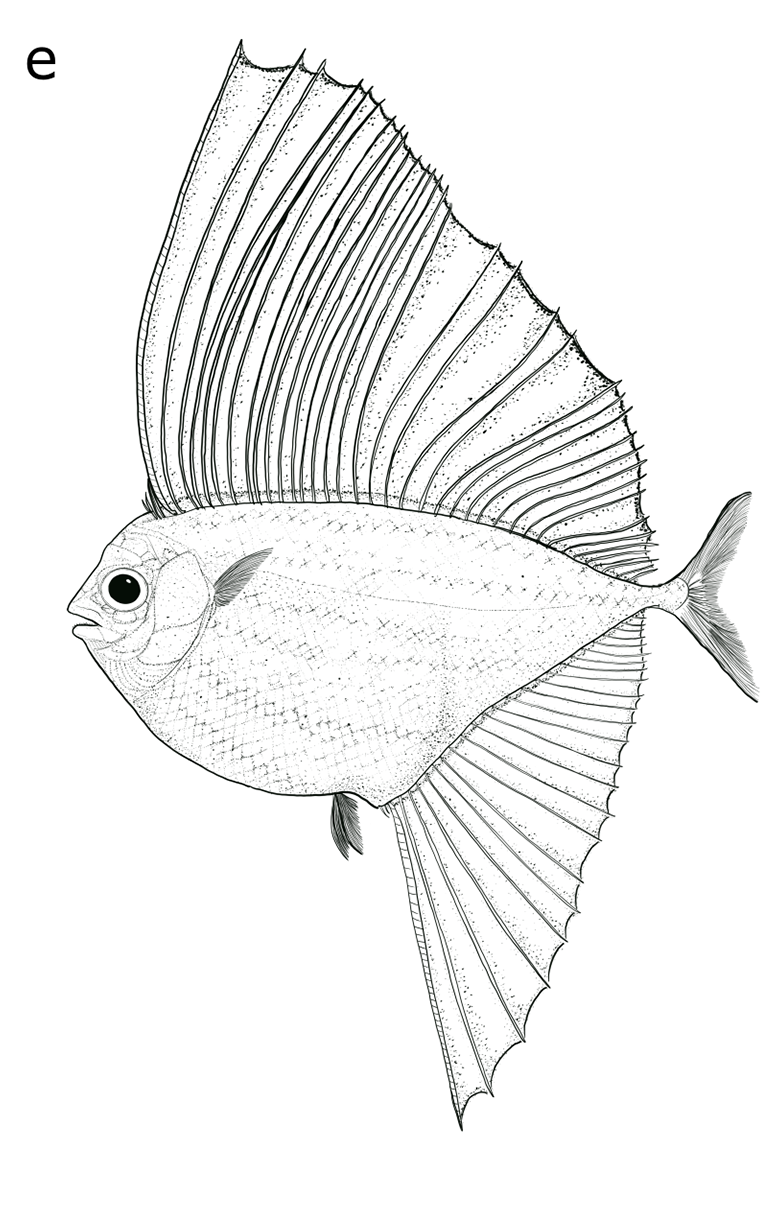
Tselfatia formosa

== Genera ==
Plethodidae contains the following genera:

- Bachea
- Bananogmius
- Concavotectum?
- Dixonanogmius
- Enischnorhynchus
- Luxilites
- Martinichthys
- Moorevillia
- Niobrara
- Paranogmius
- Pentanogmius
- Plethodus
- Pseudanogmius
- Pseudothryptodus
- Rhamphoichthys
- Syntegmodus
- Thryptodus
- Tselfatia
- Zanclites
