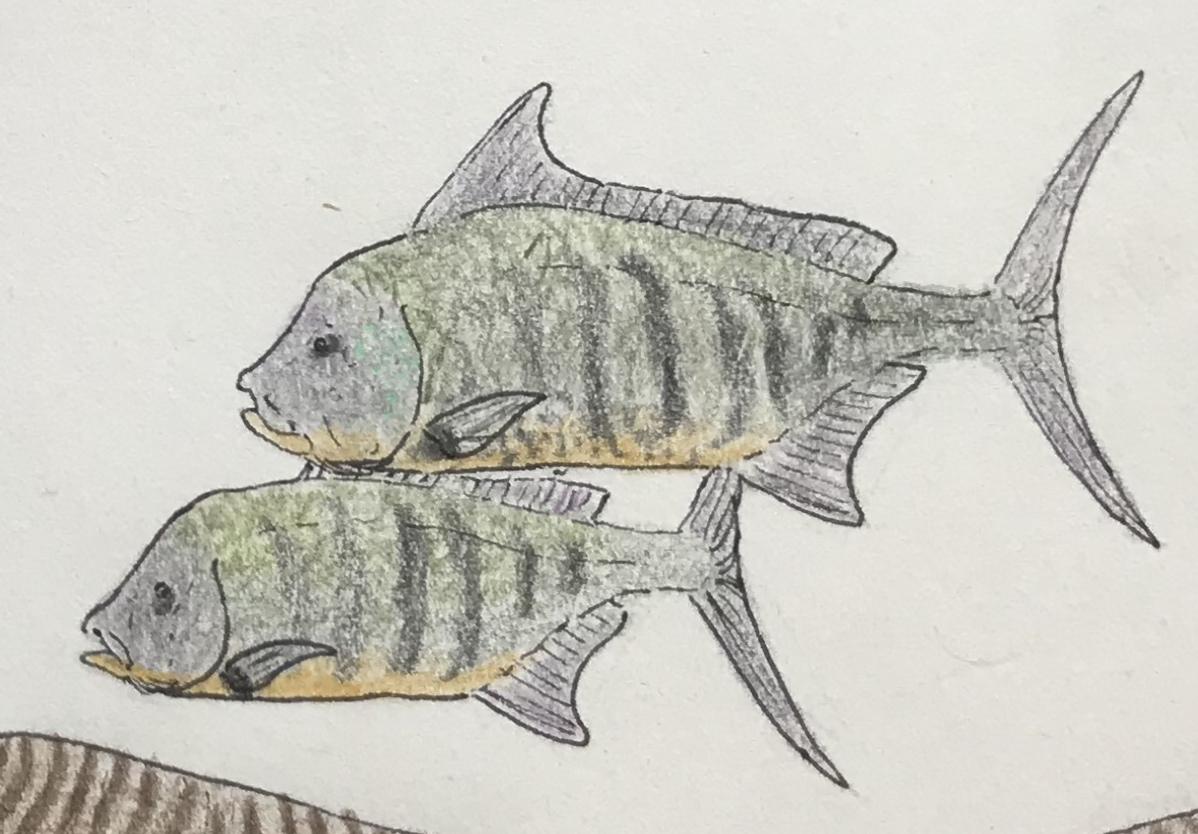

Scientific classification
- Kingdom: Animalia
- Phylum: Chordata
- Class: Actinopterygii
- Order: †Tselfatiiformes
- Family: †Plethodidae
- Genus: †Concavotectum; Cavin & Forey, 2008
- Species: †C. moroccensis

Binomial name
- †Concavotectum moroccensis Cavin & Forey, 2008 vide Cavin et al., 2010

Synonyms
- Paranogmius doederleini? Stromer, 1915

= Concavotectum =

Concavotectum Temporal range: Early Cenomanian

Extinct genus of fishes

Concavotectum is an extinct genus of freshwater plethodid ray-finned fish that lived during the Cenomanian in Morocco and possibly Egypt. It was discovered and named in 2008 and is known from a single well preserved hand-sized skull and a few isolated vertebrae discovered in the Kem Kem Group (Gara Sbaa Formation). The type species, C. moroccensis, was named in 2008 and described in 2010.

A possible second and third specimen, found in the Baharija Formation, consists of a 2 skulls and several vertebra, which were discovered in 1916 and were all destroyed on the night of 24-25 April 1944, during the Bombing of Munich in World War II. They are currently the holotype of the possible synonym Paranogmius. Some differences are evident between the surviving illustrations of Paranogmius and the skull of Concavotectum, so they are tentatively considered distinct genera, and a new genus is still necessary given the destruction of the former type specimens.

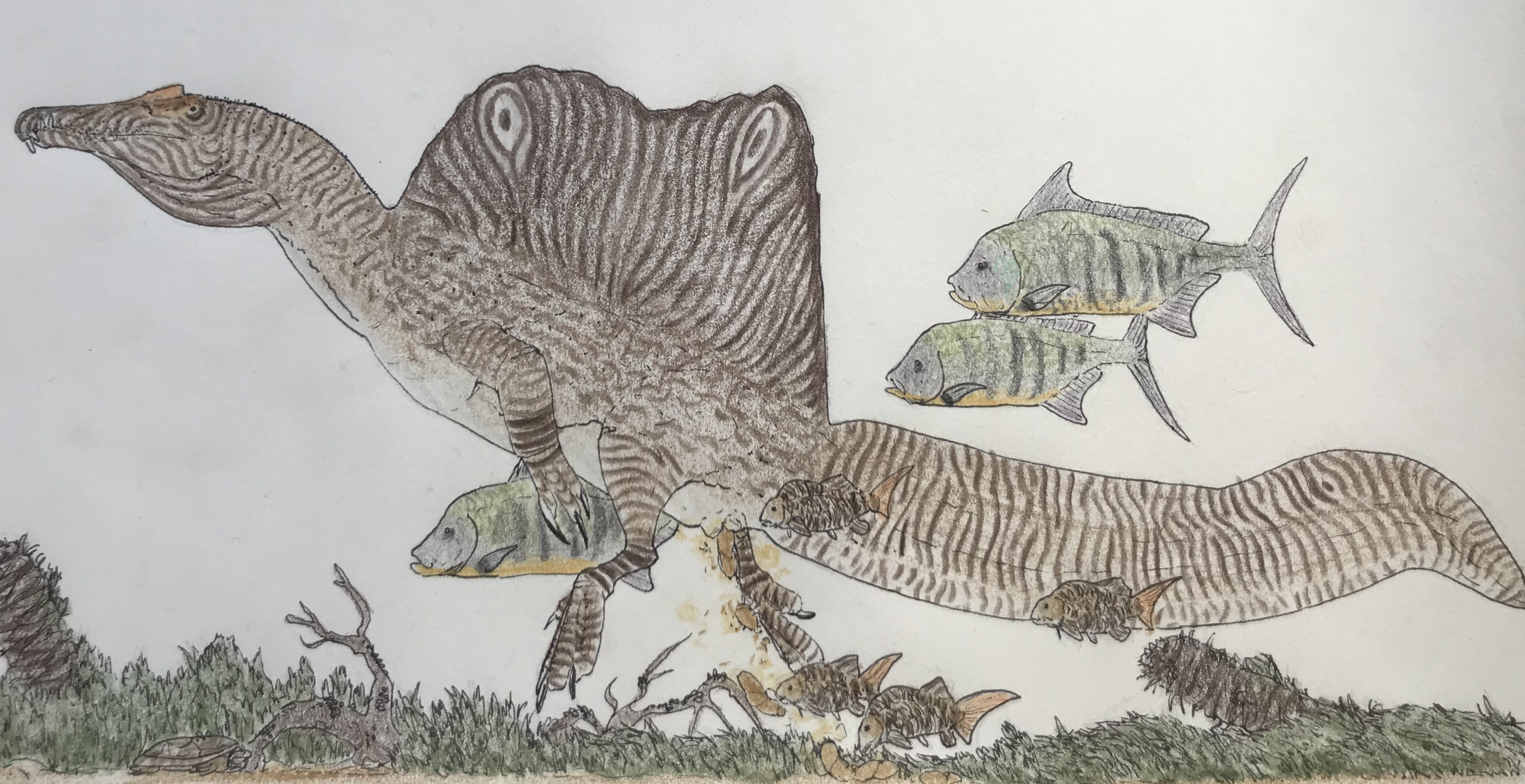
Life restoration with Spinosaurus
