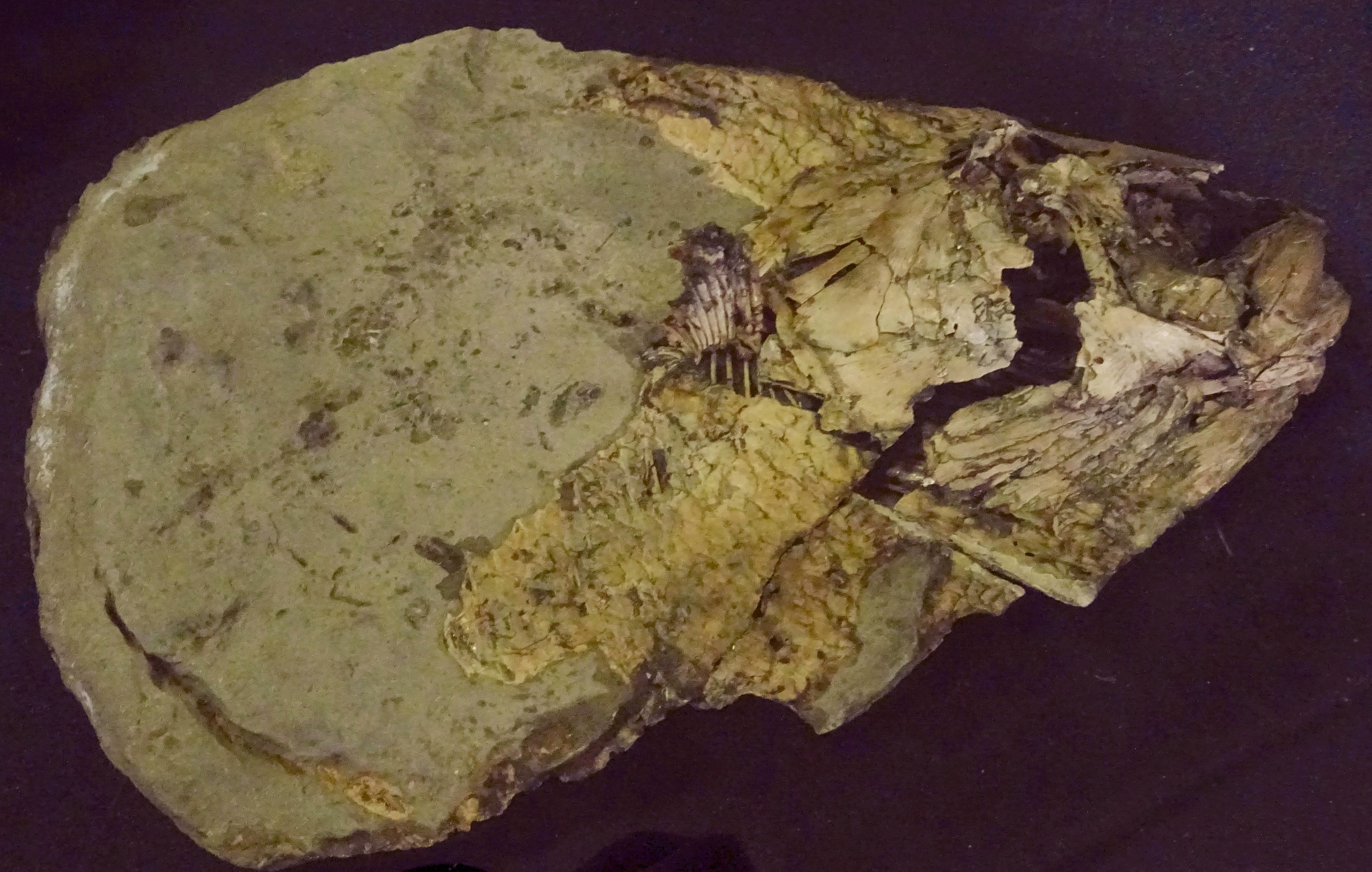
- Holotype specimen of B. huilensis

Scientific classification
- Kingdom: Animalia
- Phylum: Chordata
- Class: Actinopterygii
- Order: †Tselfatiiformes
- Family: †Plethodidae
- Genus: †Bachea; Páramo, 1997
- Species: †B. huilensis

Binomial name
- †Bachea huilensis Páramo, 1997

= Bachea =

Bachea Temporal range: Turonian ~93–90 Ma

Extinct genus of fishes

Bachea is an extinct genus of ray-finned fish that lived during the Late Cretaceous in what is now central Colombia, South America. The type species is Bachea huilensis, described in 1997 by María Páramo from the Turonian of Huila, Colombia.

== Description ==
The genus name Bachea is derived from the Baché River in Huila and the specific epithet refers to the Huila Department, where the fossils were found. The fish is placed in the suborder Tselfatoidei, but the family placement is uncertain. The fossil find is the first specimen from the suborder in Colombia, extending their distribution.

The fish had a tall body with the dorsal fin folded along the back of the body. The mouth was relatively small, with extruding teeth. These characteristics are found in part in other early Late Cretaceous fish, such as Concavotectum moroccensis from the Kem Kem Beds of Morocco. The several specimens found range from 0.5 to 1 metre (20 to 39 in) in length, making Bachea one of the larger forms in their order. They are considered to have lived in a coastal environment and probably had a scavenger diet.

== Paleoecology ==
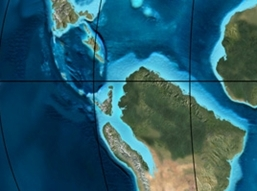
Paleogeography of Northern South America 90 Ma, by Ron Blakey

The fossils of Bachea huilensis were reported to have been found in the La Frontera Formation of the Villeta Group, a formation dating to the Turonian. As the mosasaur Yaguarasaurus columbianus, reported from the same formation, the La Frontera Formation has not been mapped south of Cundinamarca. The time-equivalent formations of the La Frontera Formation, which is restricted to the central Eastern Ranges of the Colombian Andes, are the Hondita and Loma Gorda Formations (pertaining to the Güagüaquí Group) from the south-central Upper Magdalena Valley and surrounding Eastern and Central Ranges. These formations were deposited in a relative highstand sequence with an oceanic oxygen depletion event in the seaway present in the Late Cretaceous in northwestern South America. Other fossil fish found from this period are Pachyrhizodus etayoi also from Turonian Huila, and Candelarhynchus padillai from the San Rafael Formation, which is also rich in ammonite fauna and preserves crustaceans.

The Turonian to early Coniacian Loma Gorda Formation has provided many genera of ammonites, while the underlying Hondita Formation is poorer in these cephalopods and probably dates to the Cenomanian.
