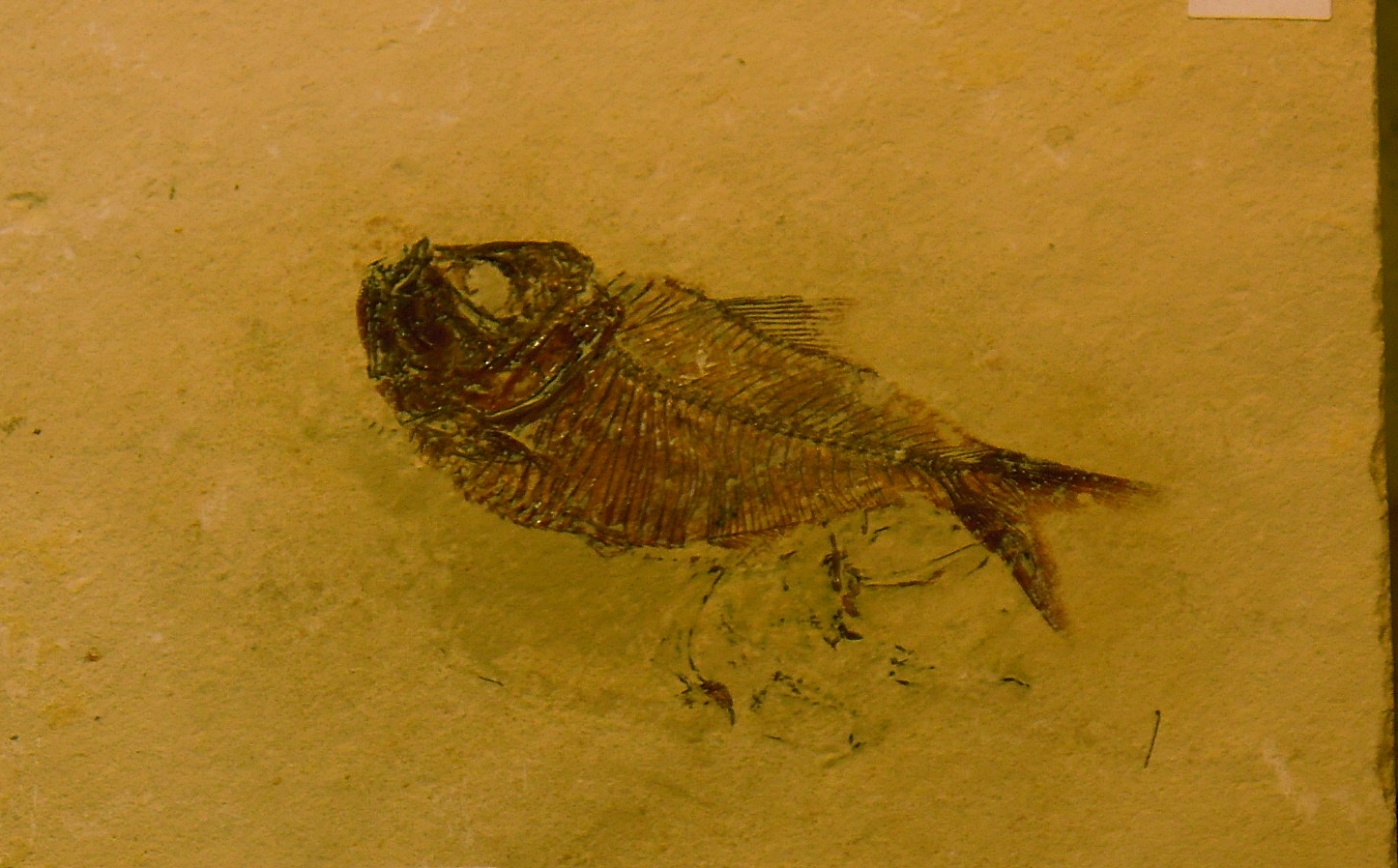

Scientific classification
- Kingdom: Animalia
- Phylum: Chordata
- Class: Actinopterygii
- Division: Teleostei
- Order: †Tselfatiiformes
- Family: †Protobramidae
- Genus: †Protobrama; Woodward, 1942
- Species: †P. avus

Binomial name
- †Protobrama avus Woodward, 1942

= Protobrama =

Protobrama Temporal range: Late Cretaceous

Extinct genus of ray-finned fishes

Protobrama is an extinct genus of teleost fish from the Cretaceous period of Lebanon.

Protobrama was a small fish, only 15 centimetres (6 in) long, and is thought to have hunted around coral reefs. It had a deep body, with long dorsal and anal fins, but had no pelvic fin. The position of the pectoral fins high on the body suggests that it was probably a fairly agile fish.
