= Luxilites =

Luxilites Temporal range: Coniacian

Scientific classification
- Kingdom: Animalia
- Phylum: Chordata
- Class: Actinopterygii
- Order: †Tselfatiiformes
- Family: †Plethodidae
- Genus: †Luxilites; Jordan, 1924
- Species: †L. striolatus

Binomial name
- †Luxilites striolatus Jordan, 1924

Extinct genus of fishes

Luxilites is an extinct genus of prehistoric bony fish.
