= Protostomias =

Protostomias Temporal range: Lower Cenomanian

Scientific classification
- Domain: Eukaryota
- Kingdom: Animalia
- Phylum: Chordata
- Class: Actinopterygii
- Order: Elopiformes
- Genus: †Protostomias; Arambourg, 1933

Protostomias is an extinct genus of prehistoric bony fish that lived during the lower Cenomanian.

== See also ==
- Prehistoric fish
- List of prehistoric bony fish
