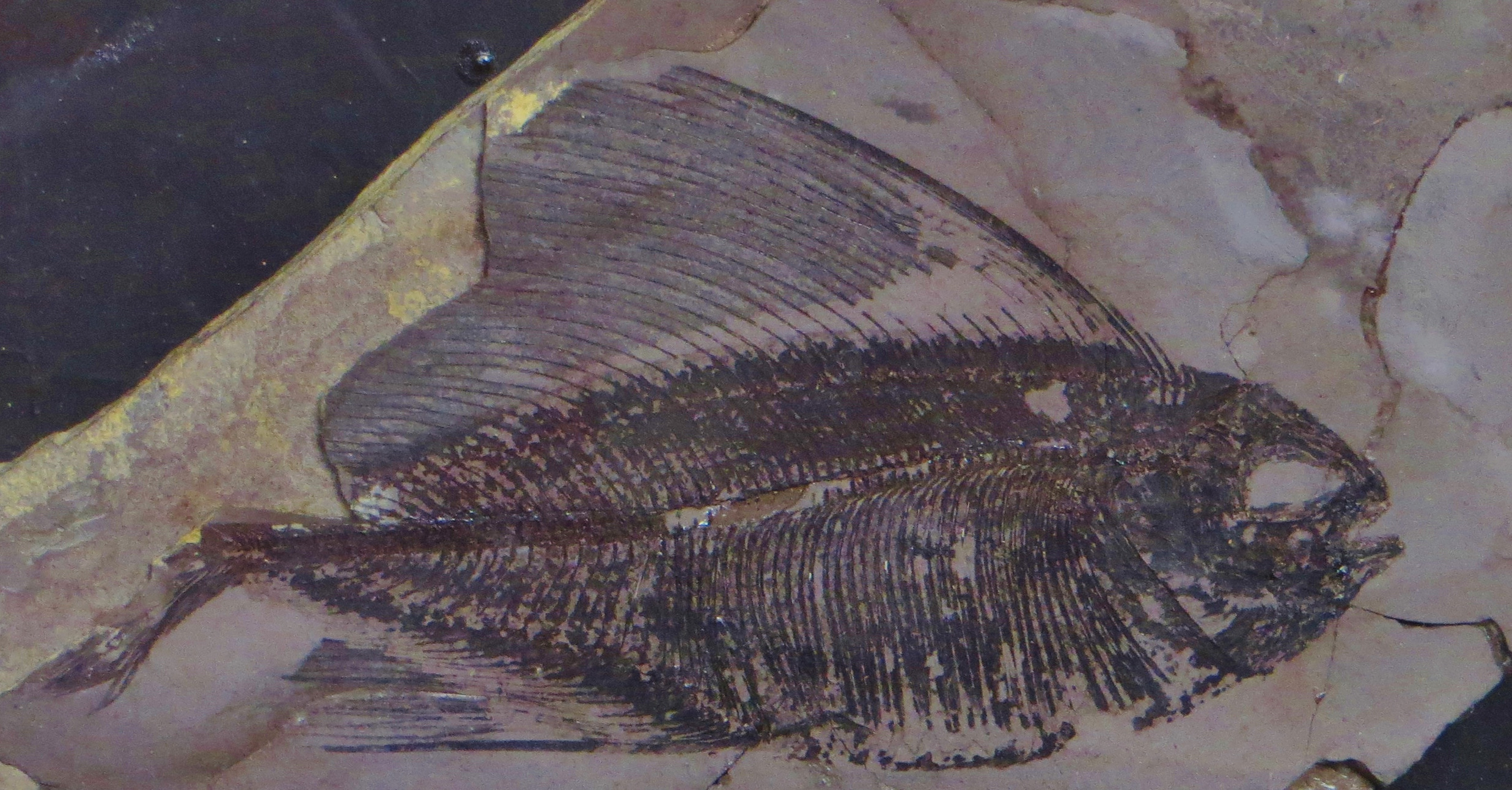
- T. formosa specimen
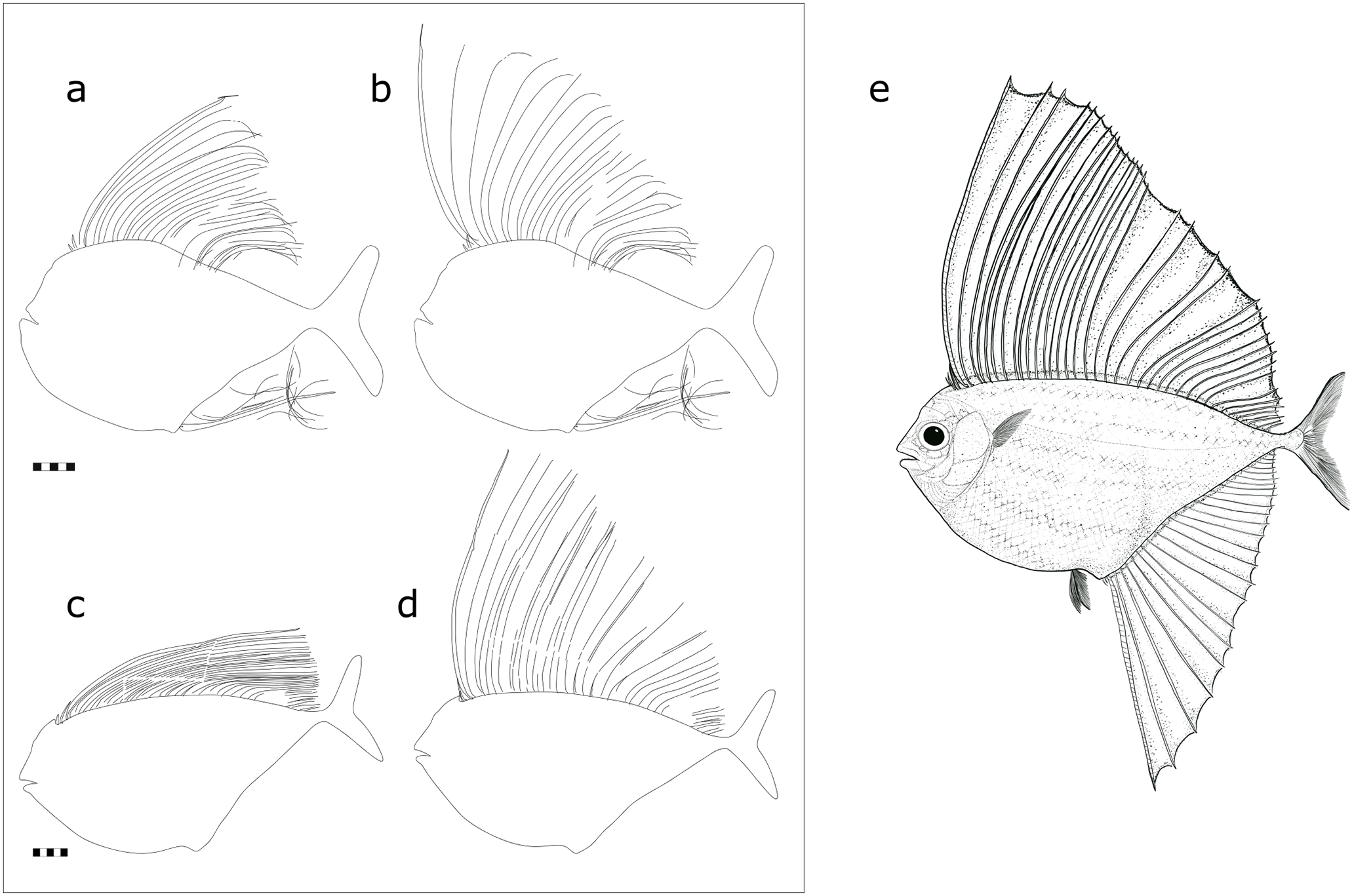
- Reconstruction

Scientific classification
- Domain: Eukaryota
- Kingdom: Animalia
- Phylum: Chordata
- Class: Actinopterygii
- Order: †Tselfatiiformes
- Family: †Plethodidae
- Genus: †Tselfatia; Arambourg, 1943

Type species
- †Tselfatia formosa Arambourg, 1943

Other species
- †T. dalmatica Bardack & Teller-Marshall, 1980

= Tselfatia =

Tselfatia Temporal range: Late Cretaceous, Cenomanian–Turonian

Extinct genus of fishes

Tselfatia is an extinct genus of Cretaceous bony fish. Originally described from (and named after) Djebl Tselfat in Morocco, it has since been discovered at sites in several other countries (Texas/USA, Germany, Mexico, Italy and the former Yugoslavia). The type species, Tselfatia formosa, was named and described in 1943 by French paleontologist Camille Arambourg. A second species, T. dalmatica, was named in 1980 from the Dalmatian Coast of Croatia.

The enormous dorsal fin as well as the large anal fin both feature one much enlarged ray, characteristic for the genus. These fish are never common and more work needs to be done on the known specimens.
