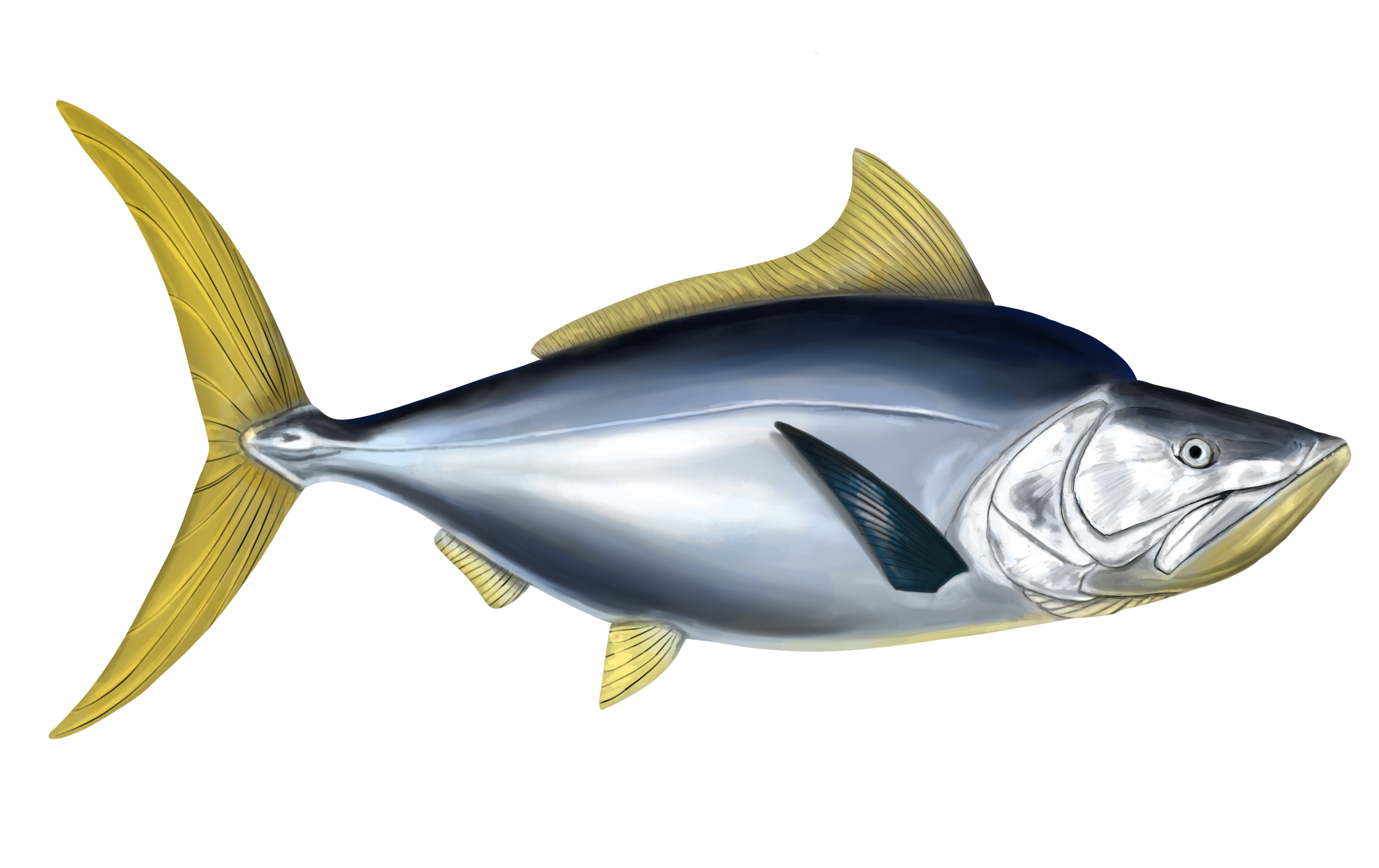
- Restoration of P. caninus

Scientific classification
- Domain: Eukaryota
- Kingdom: Animalia
- Phylum: Chordata
- Class: Actinopterygii
- Order: †Crossognathiformes
- Family: †Pachyrhizodontidae
- Genus: †Pachyrhizodus; Dixon, 1850

Type species
- †Pachyrhizodus basalis Dixon, 1850

Other species
- P. caninus Cope, 1872; P. curvatus Loomis, 1900; P. dibleyi Loomis, 1900; P. etayoi Páramo, 1997; P. grawi Bartholomai, 2012; P. kingi Cope, 1872; P. leptognathus Stewart, 1898; P. leptopsis Cope, 1874; P. minimus Stewart, 1899; P. subulidens Owen, 1842

= Pachyrhizodus =

Pachyrhizodus Temporal range: Cenomanian-Danian ~94.3–61.6 Ma

Extinct genus of ray-finned fishes

Pachyrhizodus is an extinct genus of ray-finned fish that lived during the Cretaceous to Paleocene in what is now Europe, North America, South America, and Oceania. Many species are known, primarily from the Cretaceous of England and the midwestern United States.

== History and discovery ==
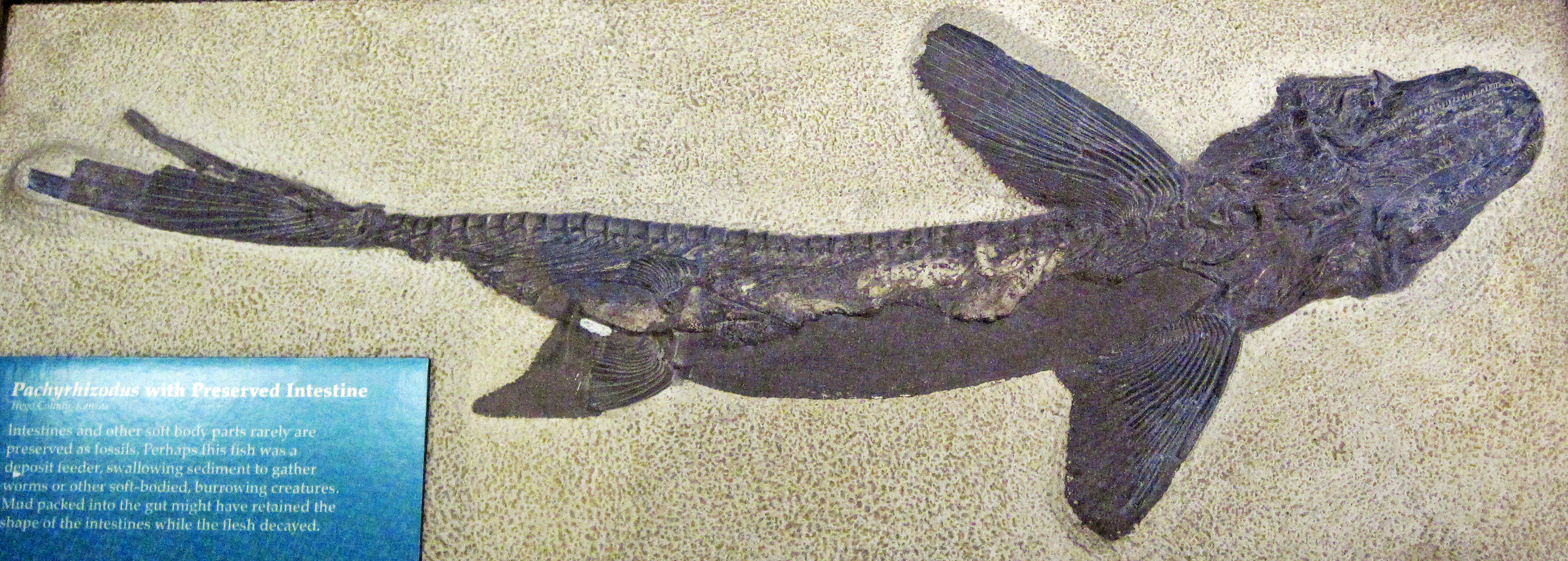
Fossil with gut content, Sternberg Museum of Natural History

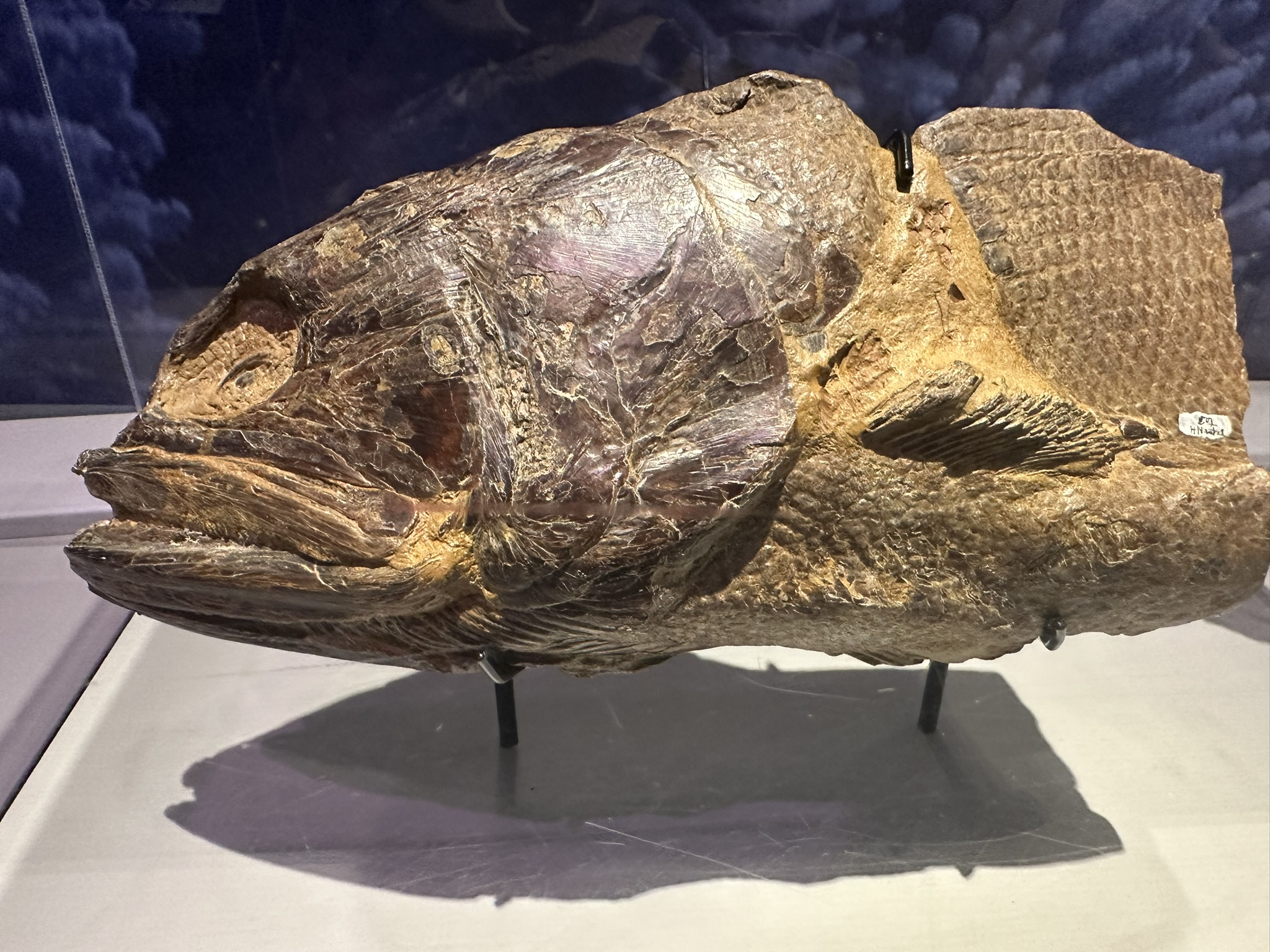
Well-preserved specimen of P. minimus, Perot Museum

Pachyrhizodus fossils were first collected from Cambridgeshire, England in the 1840s and were very fragmentary, only a partial maxilla (SMB.9097) and were described as a species of Raphiosaurus in 1842 by Richard Owen. The type remains of Pachyrhizodus consisted of a maxilla (BMNH 49014) from the Lower Cretaceous of Sussex, England and was originally thought to be a mandible that Louis Agassiz dubbed Pachyrhizodus in 1850, with Frederick Dixon creating the species name basalis for the specimen. Over the next few years, many Pachyrhizodus species would be named only from England until in 1872, Edward Drinker Cope described large remains from the Smoky Hill Chalk of Kansas of several new species. During the 19th century, several complete and partial skeletons of Pachyrhizodus were collected from England, many of which belonging to P. basalis and P. subulidens. In 1899, Alban Stewart described the mandibles of another species, P. minimus, from Kansas and it is the most commonly discovered species of Pachyrhizodus. Since the 19th century, many complete skeletons and species have been described from many regions. P. caninus specifically has been discovered in the United States, Mexico, and New Zealand.
