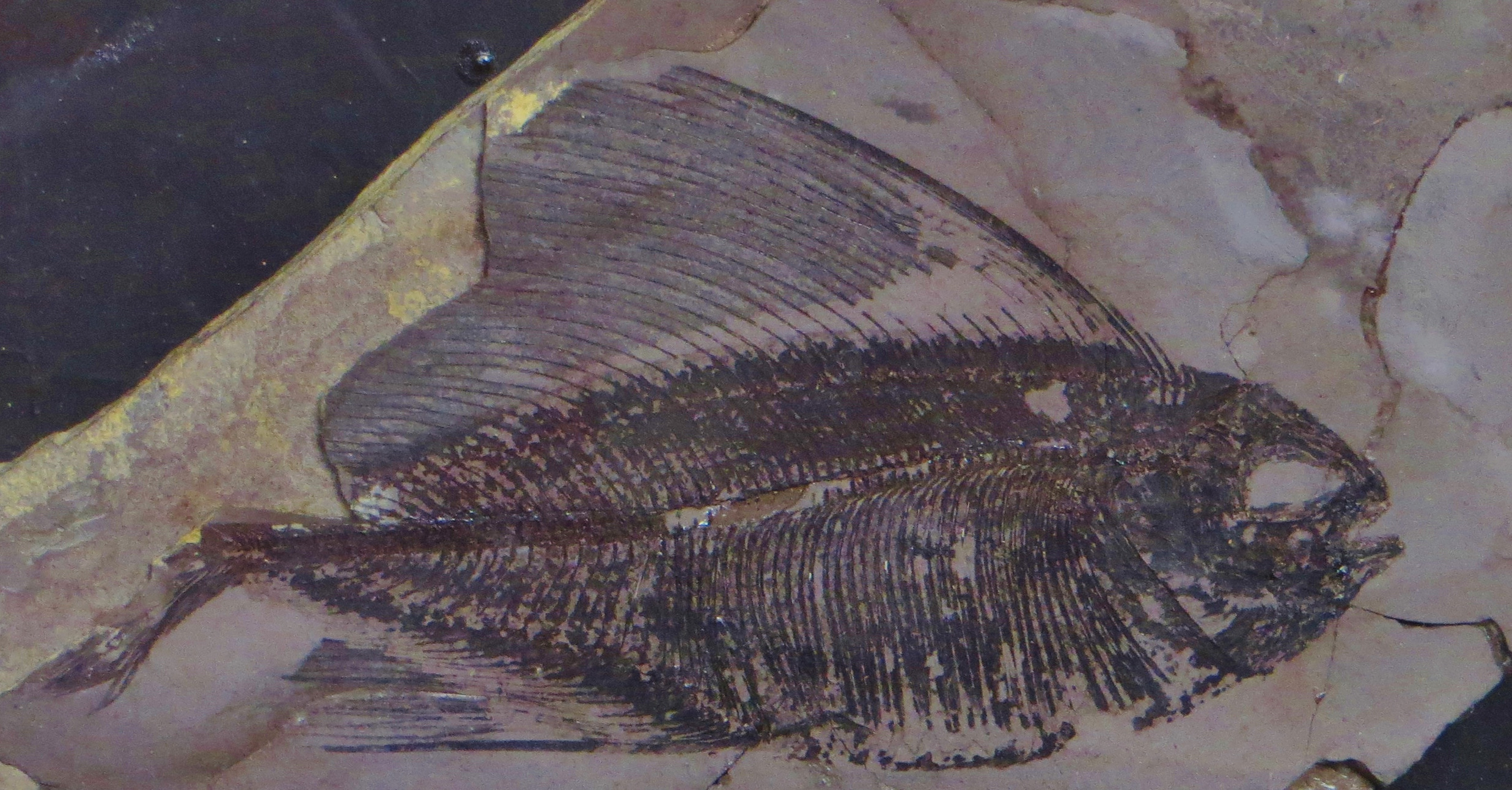
- Tselfatia formosa fossil in the Muséum national d'histoire naturelle, Paris

Scientific classification
- Kingdom: Animalia
- Phylum: Chordata
- Class: Actinopterygii
- Division: Teleostei
- Supercohort: Teleocephala
- Clade: Clupeocephala
- Order: †Tselfatiiformes; Nelson, 1994

Families
- †Eoplethodus; †Plethodidae; †Protobramidae

Synonyms
- Bananogmiiformes

= Tselfatiiformes =

Tselfatiiformes Temporal range: Early Cretaceous-Late Cretaceous, Albian–Maastrichtian

Extinct order of ray-finned fishes

Tselfatiiformes is an extinct order of bony fishes from the infraclass Teleostei. The order represents the most important radiation of marine teleosts during the Cretaceous period. Fossils of tselfatiiforms are known from Europe, North America, central and northern South America, the Middle East and North Africa.

The order appeared in the upper Albian on the coasts of Europe and North Africa and spread during the Cenomanian and Turonian on the Proto Atlantic to the coasts of northern South America, the Gulf of Mexico and into the Western Interior Seaway. In the Coniacian and Santonian they were very common in North American coastal waters, but disappeared from Europe and North Africa. A few species still lived in the Campanian in the Gulf of Mexico and only plethodids survived until the end of Maastrichtian.

== Features ==
The genera and species of the Tselfatiiformes had a high-backed body. The dorsal fin took up most of the length of the back. The pectoral fins were high. Ventral fins could be present or absent; if present, they were supported by six or seven fin rays. The caudal fin was forked and had 18 main fin rays. The majority of the fin rays were unsegmented. The upper jaw was formed by the premaxilla and maxilla. The palate was also toothed.

== Systematics ==
The tselfatiiforms could not initially be assigned to a larger kinship group within the Teleostei. More recent cladistic studies on the basis of their osteological characteristics have made it clear that they are primitive Clupeocephalans and represent the plesiomorphic sister group of a clade from Otocephala (Clupeomorpha and Ostariophysi) and Euteleostei.
