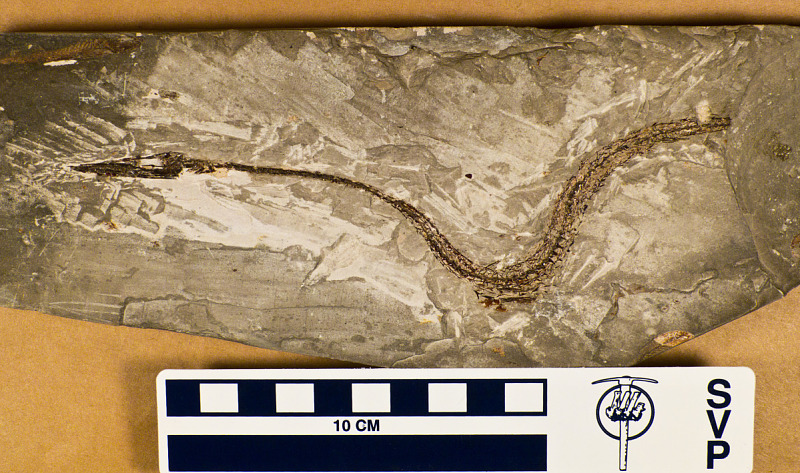
- Specimen of Dercetis
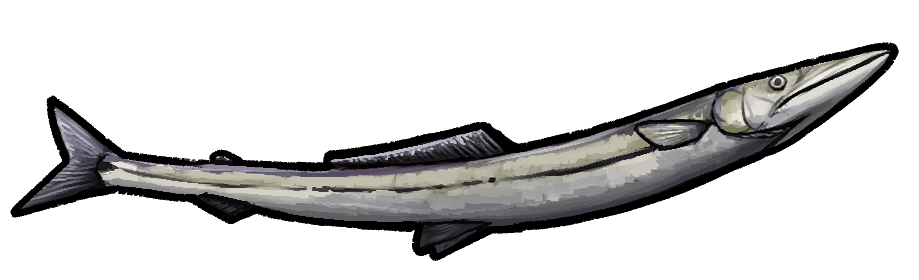
- Life restoration of Dercetis triqueter

Scientific classification
- Kingdom: Animalia
- Phylum: Chordata
- Class: Actinopterygii
- Division: Teleostei
- Order: Aulopiformes
- Suborder: †Enchodontoidei
- Family: †Dercetidae; Woodward, 1901

Type genus
- †Dercetis Agassiz, 1834

Genera
- †Antarctichthys
- †Apuliadercetis
- †Benthesikyme
- †Beukidercetis
- †Brazilodercetis
- †Candelarhynchus
- †Caudadercetis
- †Cyranichthys
- †Dercetis
- †Dercetoides
- †Hastichthys
- †Nardodercetis
- †Ophidercetis
- †Pelargorhynchus
- †Rhynchodercetis
Possible dercetids
- †Kwangodercetis
- †Leccedercetis
- †Leptecodon
- †Paradercetis
- †Petrodercetis
- †Scandiadercetis
- †Stratodus

= Dercetidae =

Dercetidae Temporal range: Cenomanian–Maastrichtian Possible Early Eocene record

Extinct family of ray-finned fish

Dercetidae is an extinct family of marine enchodontoid ray-finned fish that lived from the late Cretaceous to potentially the lower Eocene, being found worldwide. All members of the family are generally long-bodied with long jaws. Most dercetids were small fish though one of the generally agreed upon members, Dercetis magnificus, had a standard length of 1 metre (3.3 ft). Similar to other enchodontiods, the taxonomic history of the family is long and complicated with previous authors suggesting close placements to fish like deep-sea spiny eels and salmon. More recently, however, arguments have been made against Dercetidae being a monophyletic clade. Even with this being the case, papers referencing the group generally lean to the family being a true taxonomic grouping.

== History and Classification ==
Before the naming of the family, multiple genera that have been placed within Dercetidae were placed within a group referred to as Sclerodermis until Arthur Smith Woodward would coin the name Dercetidae in 1901. He would place the family close to the other more elongate fish families Halosauridae and Notacanthidae. This, however, was only based on a number of more basic similarities such as the elongated skulls and postcrania of the two groups. This classification would change in 1969 when Peter Charles Goody would place the family, along with multiple other closely related families, into Salmoniformes due to some features such as the shared features of adipose fins and features of the fins. A close relationship between the family and Cimolichthyidae was also suggested due to the similar long bodies and the presence of scutes on the sides of the fish. This would change in 1973 when D. E. Rosen would erect the new order Aulopiformes and place Dercetidae along with its relative into the suborder Alepisauroidei.

In more recent publications, the monophyly of Dercetidae has been questioned due to the lack of defining characters that is shared by all members of the family. Some previous characters, such as those relating to the overall shape of the head, were found to be present in other aulopiforms. A paper by Oksana Vernygora and coauthors would suggest that the main character of the group could be the reduction in neural spines but this would later be argued against in a 2021 paper by Jesús Alvarado-Ortega and Jesús Alberto Díaz-Cruz. These authors would suggest that this feature was more likely a homoplastic feature rather than one that could be a feature that could define the clade. Even with this being the case however, the publication would find that Dercetidae is a monophyletic clade.

A 2025 paper by Valéria Gallo and colleagues would build upon this with the description of the genus Antarctichthys which contained a phylogeny with a focus on Dercetidae. Both this paper and the previous one by Alvarado-Ortega and Díaz-Cruz would use a phylogeny originally in a 2011 publication by Hilda Silva and Valéria Gallo. This matrix would be modified in the 2021 publication and would be edited again in the 2025 paper to remove 23 characters that did nothing at the family level. Below is the cladogram generated using Implied Weighted Maximum Parsimony Analysis in the 2021 paper along with the single cladogram from the 2025 publication.

Alvarado-Ortega & Díaz-Cruz (2021)

- Dercetidae
  - Pelagorhynchus
  - Ophidercetis
  - Decrcetis
  - Cyranichthys
  - - - Apuliadercetis
      - Caudadercetis
      - Dercetoides
      - - Brazilodercetis
        - - Nardocercetis
          - - Rhynchodercetis
            - - Candelarhynchus
              - - Hastichthys gracilis
                - Hastichthys totonacus
  - - Benthesikyme

Gallo et al. (2025)

- Aulopiformes
  - Trachinocephalus
  - Dercetidae
    - Candelarhynchus
    - - - - Cyranichthys
          - Ophiderceris
        - - Benthesikyme
          - Derceris
      - - - Apuliadercetis
          - - Caudadercetis
            - Dercetoides
            - - Pelargorhynchus
              - - Brazilodercetis
                - Nardodercetis
                - - Antarctichthys
                  - - Rhynchodercetis
                    - - Hatichthys gracilis
                      - - Hatichthys totonacus

== Description ==
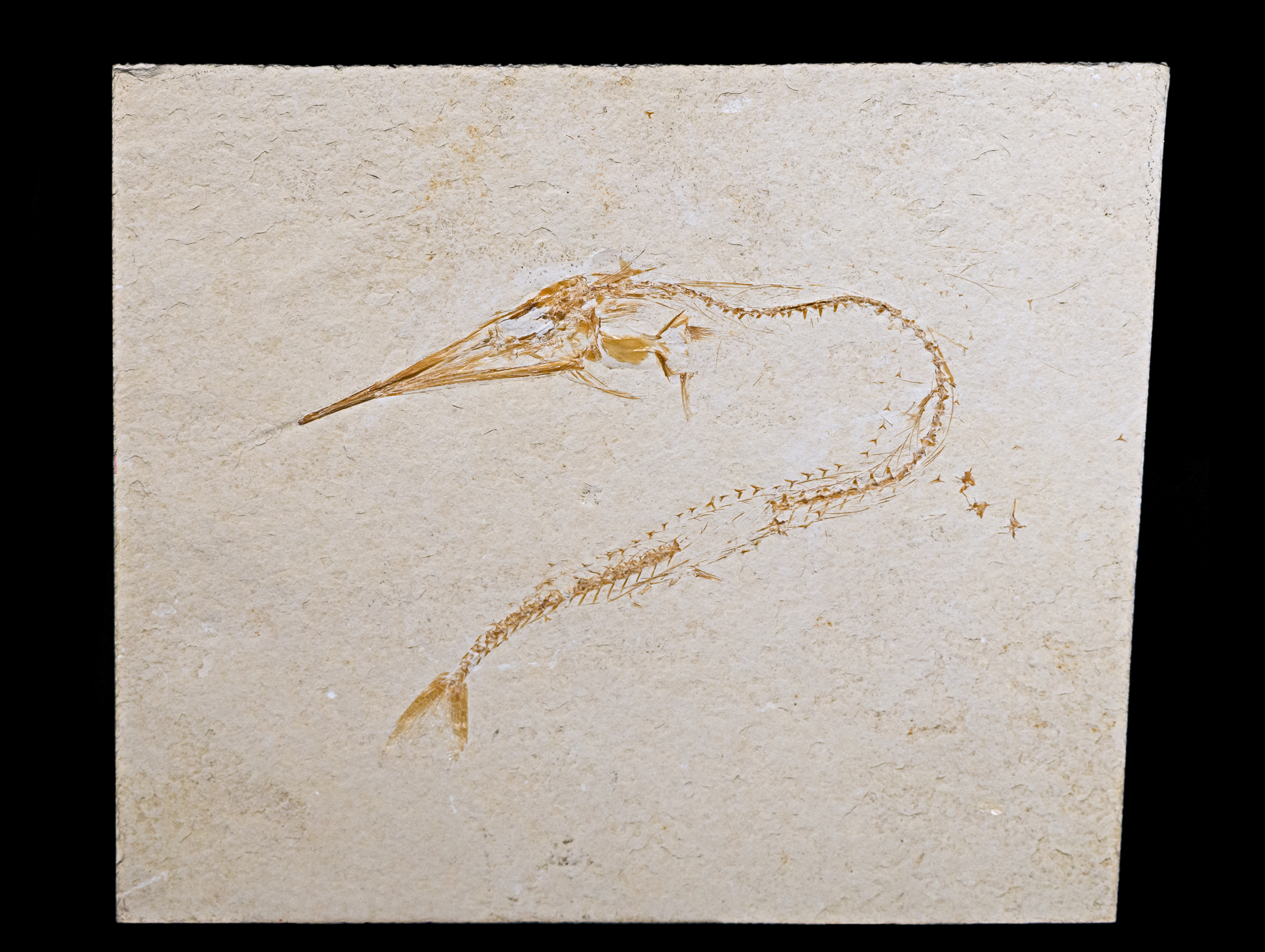
Rhynchodercetis hakelensis, a more derived member of Dercetidae.

Members of Dercetidae are generally known to be marine fish with long, shallow bodies with similarly long skulls. In some genera, such as Antarctichthys and Rhynchodercetis, the upper jaw would extend past the lower one and form a snout. Though not a trait in every genus assigned to the family, the maxilla and mandible each possess a single row of small teeth with these being absent vomer and sometimes the premaxilla. One of the few exceptions to this is Antarctichthys, which lacked teeth on both the top and bottom dentition.

Similar to other enchodontoids, dercetids were generally small though large members such as Dercetis magnificus, a fish with a standard length of over 1 metre (3.3 ft), are present in the clade. Another feature that all members share is the lack of scales outside of large ones, commonly referred to as scutes, that ran down the length of the body with these forming one to three rows depending on the species. Though still argued against by some authors, a defining feature of all dercetids is the reduced neural spines with them being equal to or less than the total vertebral length.

== Biogeography ==
Dercetids are generally associated with the Tethys Ocean with genera being found throughout the world. . A 2016 publication by Hilda Maria Andrade da Silva and Valéria Gallo would put forward the idea that the movement of the family, along with other enchodontoids, was associated with ocean currents and anoxic events. This would be in contrast to a later paper that would question this due to taking account the locations of species in a phylogenic context. When looking at the placements of members within the family, Oksana Vernygora and coauthors would suggest that members of the group would move between north and south along with east and west throughout their evolutionary history with one of the main examples of this being the genus Rhynchodercetis.

The 2025 paper by Valéria Gallo and colleagues would also look at the biogeography of the group where specific grouping were seen unlike in the previous paper. A BPA (Primary Brooks Parsimony Analysis) would be done to compare the phylogenic tree of the family to the geographic positions of the taxa. Below are the results of that analysis of the dispersal patterns of Decertidae within the publication.

- - Raquira (Colombia)
  - - - - Maastrich (Belgium and Netherlands)
        - Liege (Belgium and Netherlands)
        - Kwango (Democratic Republic of the Congo)
      - - Bohemia (Czech Republic)
        - South England
        - Haqel Hjoula (Lebanon)
        - Lethbridge (Canada)
        - Sahel Alma (Lebanon)
        - Sendenhorst (Germany and Czech Republic)
    - - - Chiapas (Mexico)
        - Eben Emael (Belgium)
      - - Pelotas (Brazil)
        - - Bemelem (Netherlands)
          - - Nardò (Italy)
            - - James Ross (Colombia)
              - - - Puebla (Mexico)
                  - - Ein Yabrud (Palestine)
                    - Nuevo Leon (Mexico)
                - - Floresta (Italy)
                  - Hakel (Lebanon)
                  - Jebel Tselfat (Morocco)
                  - Trieste Komen (Slovenia)

Though all commonly accepted genera within the family Dercetidae are currently believed to have when extinct either due to or before the Cretaceous-Paleocene Mass Extinction, the genus Scandiadercetis was described based on material from the Danian limestone of the Limhamns kalkbrott, Sweden. Even with this being the case, more recent authors have questioned the taxon's placement within Dercetidae. Another example of a potential member of the family surviving past the mass extinction is Stratodus which is similarly a questioned member of the group. If it is a true member of the group, that would suggest the family would have actually gone extinct in the lower Eocene.

== Paleoecology ==
One of the few studied interactions documented for Dercetidae is in a 2015 paper by Bien´kowska-Wasiluk and coauthors which described the presence of a set of vertebrae found within the trace fossil Lepidenteron lewesiensis. This ichnotaxon is a small burrow which has been attributed to eunicid polychaetes along with anguillid eels. The authors of the paper suggested that the eunicid attributed was more likely in this case due to a lack of evidence of the bones being damaged by stomach acids, instead more likely being picked apart before being eaten.
