= Maastricht Formation =

Geological formation in the Netherlands and Belgium

- Stratigraphic range: Maastrichtian–Danian
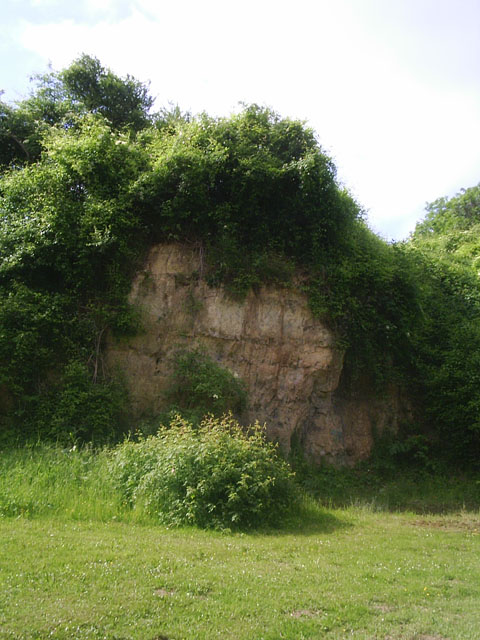
- Old stone quarry at Kunrade, where the Kunrade Member of the Maastricht Formation outcrops
- Type: Geological formation
- Sub-units: Meerssen Member, Nekum Member, Emael Member, Schiepersberg Member, Gronsveld Member, Valkenburg Member and Kunrade Member
- Underlies: Houthem Formation
- Overlies: Gulpen Formation
- Thickness: 30–90 m (98–295 ft)

Lithology
- Primary: Chalk
- Other: Marl, flint

Location
- Region: Europe
- Country: Netherlands; Belgium

Type section
- Named for: Maastricht
- Named by: Dumont
- Year defined: 1849

The Maastricht Formation (Dutch: Formatie van Maastricht; abbreviation: MMa), named after the city of Maastricht in the Netherlands, is a geological formation in the Netherlands and Belgium whose strata date back to the Late Cretaceous, within 500,000 years of the Cretaceous–Paleogene boundary, now dated at 66 million years ago. The formation is part of the Chalk Group and is between 30 and 90 metres (98 and 295 ft) thick. It crops out in southern parts of Dutch and Belgian Limburg and adjacent areas in Germany. It can be found in the subsurface of northern Belgium and southeastern Netherlands, especially in the Campine Basin and Roer Valley Graben. Dinosaur remains are among the fossils that have been recovered from the formation.

== Lithology ==
The Maastricht Formation consists of soft, sandy shallow marine limestone (in Limburg locally called "mergel"), in fact chalk and calcareous arenite. These lithologies locally alternate with thin bands of marl or clay. The lower parts of the formation contain flint concretions. The upper parts can have shellrich layers. Its age is between about 70 and 66 million years, which puts it in the Maastrichtian, a stage that was named after the formation. The top of the formation has been identified as Danian (early Paleocene) in age. The type locality is at the ruins of Lichtenberg castle on Mount Saint Peter, Maastricht.

== Depositional environment ==
Two primary environment-types have been described in the Maastricht Formation. The lower Kunrade Chalk representing a shallow, semi-lagoonal area near land of low relief which supplied terrigenous material. The Biofacies of the Kunrade Chalk are dominated by burrowing bivalves and abundant seagrass. In contrast, the upper Maastricht Chalk was deposited further offshore in clean carbonate sands. Periods of non deposition resulted in the lithification of sands forming hardgrounds that supported a diversity of echinoids and corals.

== Stratigraphy ==
The Maastricht Formation was first described by Belgian geologist André Dumont in 1849. The formation is subdivided in seven members, from top to bottom these are the Meerssen Member, Nekum Member, Emael Member, Schiepersberg Member, Gronsveld Member, Valkenburg Member and Kunrade Member. The members are often hard to distinguish.

The Maastricht Formation is overlain by the Paleocene Houthem Formation and was deposited on top of the older Gulpen Formation.

== Vertebrate paleofauna ==
=== Dinosaurs ===
Color key: Taxon / Reclassified taxon / Taxon falsely reported as present / Dubious taxon or junior synonym / Ichnotaxon / Ootaxon / Morphotaxon	Notes; Uncertain or tentative taxa are in small text; ~~crossed out~~ taxa are discredited.

Dinosaurs reported from the Maastricht Formation
Genus	Species	Location	Stratigraphic position	Material	Notes	Images
Asteriornis	A. maastrichtensis			Limb bones and a mostly complete skull	A stem-Galloanserae	Interpretive drawing of the Asteriornis fossil
Betasuchus	B. bredai	Geographically present in the Dutch province of Limburg.		"Femur."	An abelisauroid.	Life reconstruction of Betasuchus
Janavis	J. finalidens				An ichthyornithine	Holotype fossil of Janavis finalidens
~~Megalosaurus~~	M. bredai	Geographically present in the Dutch province of Limburg.			Reclassified as Betasuchus bredai.	
Orthomerus	O. dolloi	Geographically present in the Dutch and Belgian provinces of Limburg.			A dubious hadrosaurid.	Mounted skeletal reconstruction of Orthomerus
Indeterminate euhadrosaurian remains		Geographically present in the Dutch province of Limburg.			A hadrosauroid.	
"Unnamed ornithurine"	Unnamed				An ornithurine.	
"Unnamed enantiornithine"	Unnamed				An enantiornithine.	

=== Mammals ===
Color key: Taxon / Reclassified taxon / Taxon falsely reported as present / Dubious taxon or junior synonym / Ichnotaxon / Ootaxon / Morphotaxon	Notes; Uncertain or tentative taxa are in small text; ~~crossed out~~ taxa are discredited.

Mammals reported from the Maastricht Formation
Genus	Species	Location	Stratigraphic position	Material	Notes	Images
Maastrichtidelphys	M. meurismeti	Geographically present in the Dutch province of Limburg.		"Right upper molar."	A herpetotheriid.	

=== Mosasaurs ===
Color key: Taxon / Reclassified taxon / Taxon falsely reported as present / Dubious taxon or junior synonym / Ichnotaxon / Ootaxon / Morphotaxon	Notes; Uncertain or tentative taxa are in small text; ~~crossed out~~ taxa are discredited.

Mosasaurs reported from the Maastricht Formation
Genus	Species	Location	Stratigraphic position	Material	Notes	Images
Carinodens	C. belgicus					
Carinodens	C. fraasi				Junior synonym of C. belgicus.	
~~Globidens~~	G. fraasi				Reclassified as Carinodens fraasi	
Mosasaurus	M. hoffmannii				Holotype	
Mosasaurus	M. lemonnieri					
Plioplatecarpus	P. marshi					
Prognathodon	P.? saturator					
Prognathodon	P.? sectorius					

=== Testudines ===
Testudines reported from the Maastricht Formation
Genus	Species	Location	Stratigraphic position	Material	Notes	Images
Allopleuron	A. hofmanni					Mounted skeleton of Allopleuron
Glyptochelone	G. suyckerbuyki					

=== Plesiosauria ===
- Indeterminate elasmosaurids

=== Bony fish ===
Bony fish reported from the Maastricht Formation
Genus	Species	Location	Stratigraphic position	Material	Notes	Images
Alaconger	A. triquetrus			Otoliths	A conger eel.	
Ampheristus	A. sp.			Otolith	A cusk-eel.	
Anomoeodus	A. foriri			Teeth, tooth plates	A pycnodont.	
Anomoeodus	A. fraiponti			Teeth, tooth plates	A pycnodont.	
Anomoeodus	A. subclavatus			Teeth, tooth plates	A pycnodont.	
Apateodus	A. corneti			Jaws, teeth, articulated skull	An ichthyotringid aulopiform.	
Archaemacruroides	A. vanknippenbergi			Otoliths	A gadiform of uncertain affinities.	
Argentina	A. voigti			Otoliths	A herring smelt.	
Argyroberyx	A. dentatus			Otoliths	A beryciform of uncertain affinities.	
Belonostomus	B. sp.			Teeth, jaws	An aspidorhynchid.	
Beukidercetis	B. grandis			Skull bones, scutes, scales	A dercetid aulopiform.	
Caudadercetis	C. taverni				A dercetid aulopiform.	
Centroberyx	C. fragilis			Otolith	A nannygai.	
Cimolichthys	C. sp.			Teeth	A cimolichthyid aulopiform.	
Cretaserranus	C. maastrichtiensis			Otoliths	A perciform, possibly a serranid.	
Cyranichthys	C. jagti			Articulated specimen, scutes	A dercetid aulopiform.	
Cyranichthys	C. sideralis			Articulated specimen, scutes	A dercetid aulopiform.	
Dercetis	D. triqueter			Articulated specimens	A dercetid aulopiform.	
Enchodus	E. faujasi			Jaws with teeth	An enchodontid aulopiform.	
Hoplopteryx	H. sp.			Articulated specimens	A trachichthyiform.	
?Ichthyotringa	?I. tavernei			Otoliths	An ichthyotringid aulopiform.	
Ophidercetis	O. italiensis			Skull bones, scutes	A dercetid aulopiform.	
Paraulopus	P. sp.			Otolith	A cucumberfish.	
Petrodercetis	P. bidirectus				A dercetid aulopiform.	
Pfeilichthys	P. pfeili			Otolith	A holocentriform of uncertain affinities.	
Plesiopoma	P. otiosa			Otoliths	A percomorph, possibly a lanternbelly.	
Rhinocephalus	R. cretaceus			Otoliths	A hake.	
Saurocephalus	S. woodwardii			Teeth, jaws, vertebrae	An ichthyodectiform.	
Severnichthys	S. sp.			Otolith	A beardfish.	
Sillaginocentrus	S. alienus			Otolith	A holocentriform of uncertain affinities.	
?Sparidae indet.				Otoliths	A potential seabream, but may be another non-percomorph teleost instead.	
Tetraodontiformes indet.				Scale plates	A tetraodontiform.	

== Invertebrate paleofauna ==
Invertebrates reported from the Maastricht Formation
Genus	Species	Location	Stratigraphic position	Material	Notes	Images
Maastrichtiocaris	M. rostratus		Middle Meerssen Member	Carapace	A cyclidan crustcean, youngest member of the group, has also alternatively been suggested to be a crab.	

== Plants ==
Color key: Taxon / Reclassified taxon / Taxon falsely reported as present / Dubious taxon or junior synonym / Ichnotaxon / Ootaxon / Morphotaxon	Notes; Uncertain or tentative taxa are in small text; ~~crossed out~~ taxa are discredited.

Taxa	Species	Locality	Material	Notes	Images
Araucaria?	A?. sp.		Seed-cone scales	Identified as Araucaria, in contradiction to reports citing no Araucarian pollen present.	
Brachyphyllum	B. patens			Likely belongs to Cheirolepidiaceae.	
Brachyphyllum	sp. 1			Belongs to Cheirolepidiaceae.	
Brachyphyllum	sp. 2			Possibly conspecific with sp. 1.	
Cryptomeriopsis	C. eluvialis			Belongs to Taxodiaceae.	
Cunninghamites	C. ubaghsii			Likely belongs to Taxodiaceae.	
Elatidopsis	E. cryptomerioides			Belongs to Taxodiaceae.	
Mosacaulis	M. spinifer			Stems and associated foliage, Seagrass convergent.	
Pityophyllum	P. sp.			Pinaceous needles.	
Thalassocharis	T. bosquetii			Seagrass stems and roots.	
Thalassotaenia	T. debeyi			Seagrass leaves, similar to Posidonia.	

== See also ==
- List of dinosaur-bearing rock formations
- The dictionary definition of maastricht formation at Wiktionary
