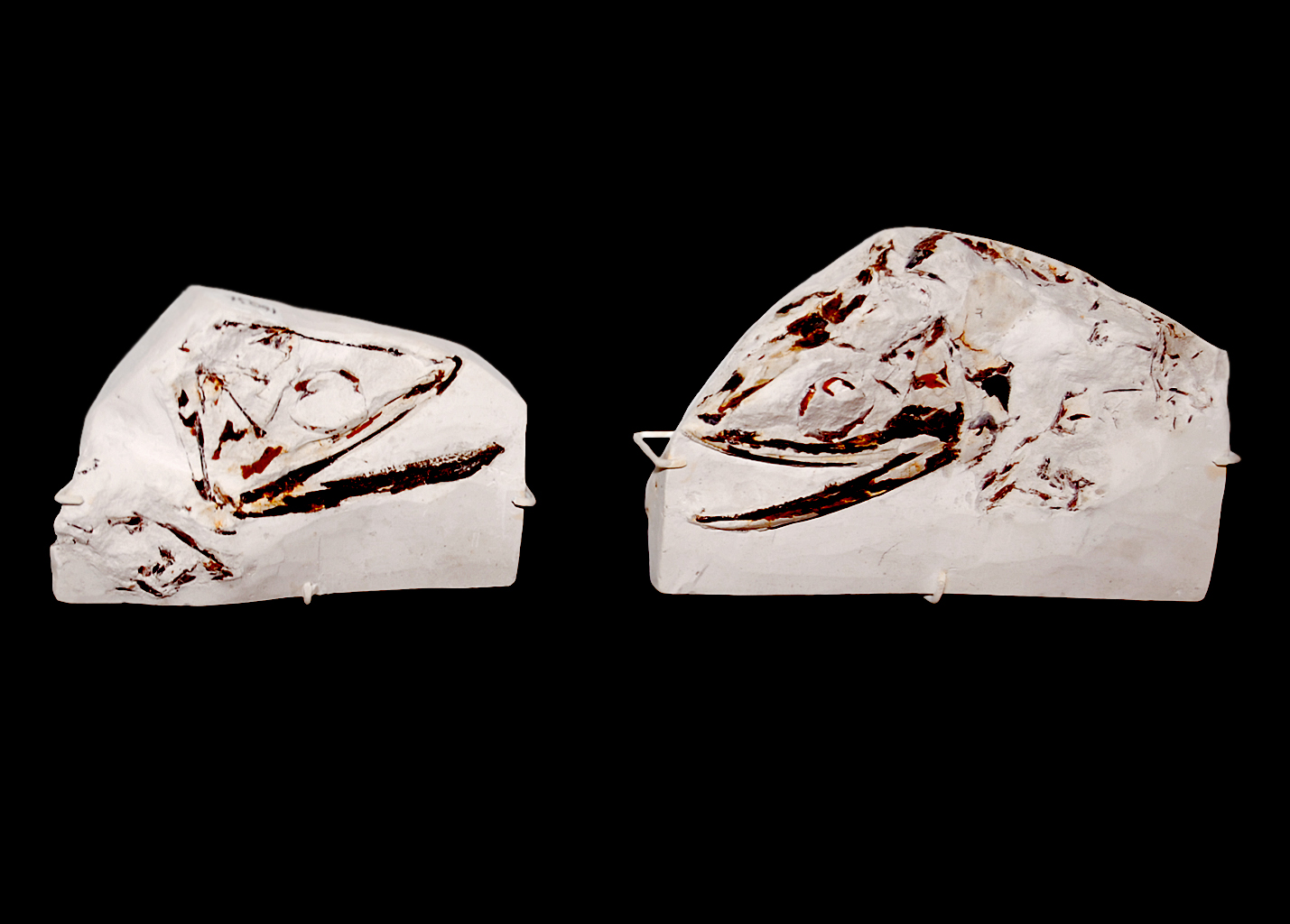
- Skulls of H. eurypterygius, Oxford University Museum of Natural History

Scientific classification
- Kingdom: Animalia
- Phylum: Chordata
- Class: Actinopterygii
- Order: Aulopiformes
- Family: †Halecidae
- Genus: †Halec; Agassiz, 1834

Type species
- †Halec sternbergi Agassiz, 1834

Species
- H. eupterygius (Dixon, 1850); H. haueri (Bassani, 1879); H. sternbergi Agassiz, 1834

Synonyms
- †Pomognathus Dixon, 1850; †Archaeogadus von der Marck, 1868

= Halec =

Halec Temporal range: Cenomanian to Coniacian

Extinct genus of ray-finned fishes

Halec is an extinct genus of prehistoric marine aulopiform ray-finned fish from mid-late Cretaceous of Europe. It is the type genus of the enchodontoid family Halecidae.

The following species are placed in this genus:

- H. eupterygius (Dixon, 1850) - Cenomanian to Coniacian of England (English Chalk) (=Pomognathus eurypterygius Dixon, 1850)
- H. haueri (Bassani, 1879) - Cenomanian of Hvar, Croatia (Starigrad Limestone) (=Elopopsis haueri Bassani, 1879)
- H. sternbergi Agassiz, 1834 (type species) - mid-late Turonian of the Czech Republic & Germany (=Archaeogadus guestphalicus von der Marck, 1868)

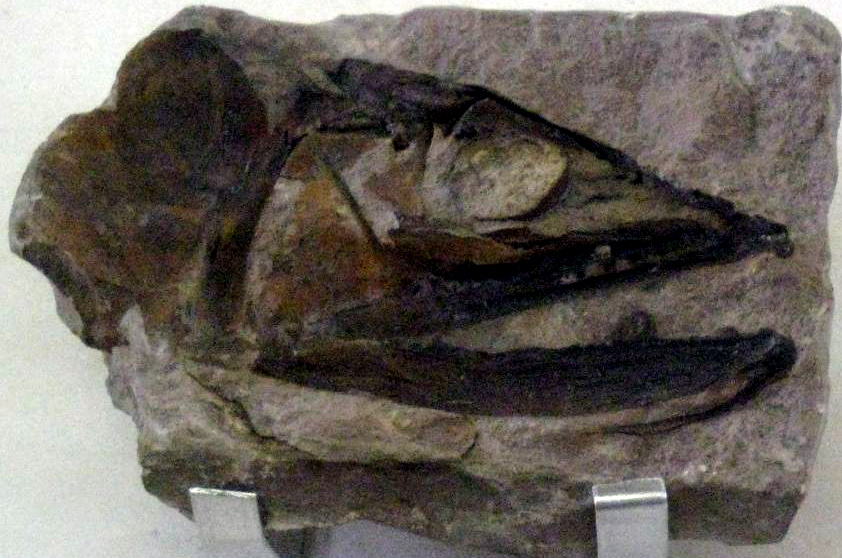
Skull of 'Halec' laubei, National Museum (Prague)

The species 'H.' laubei Frič, 1878 from the Turonian of the Czech Republic is of uncertain validity. The species H. microlepis from Lebanon is now generally placed in its own genus, Phylactocephalus.
