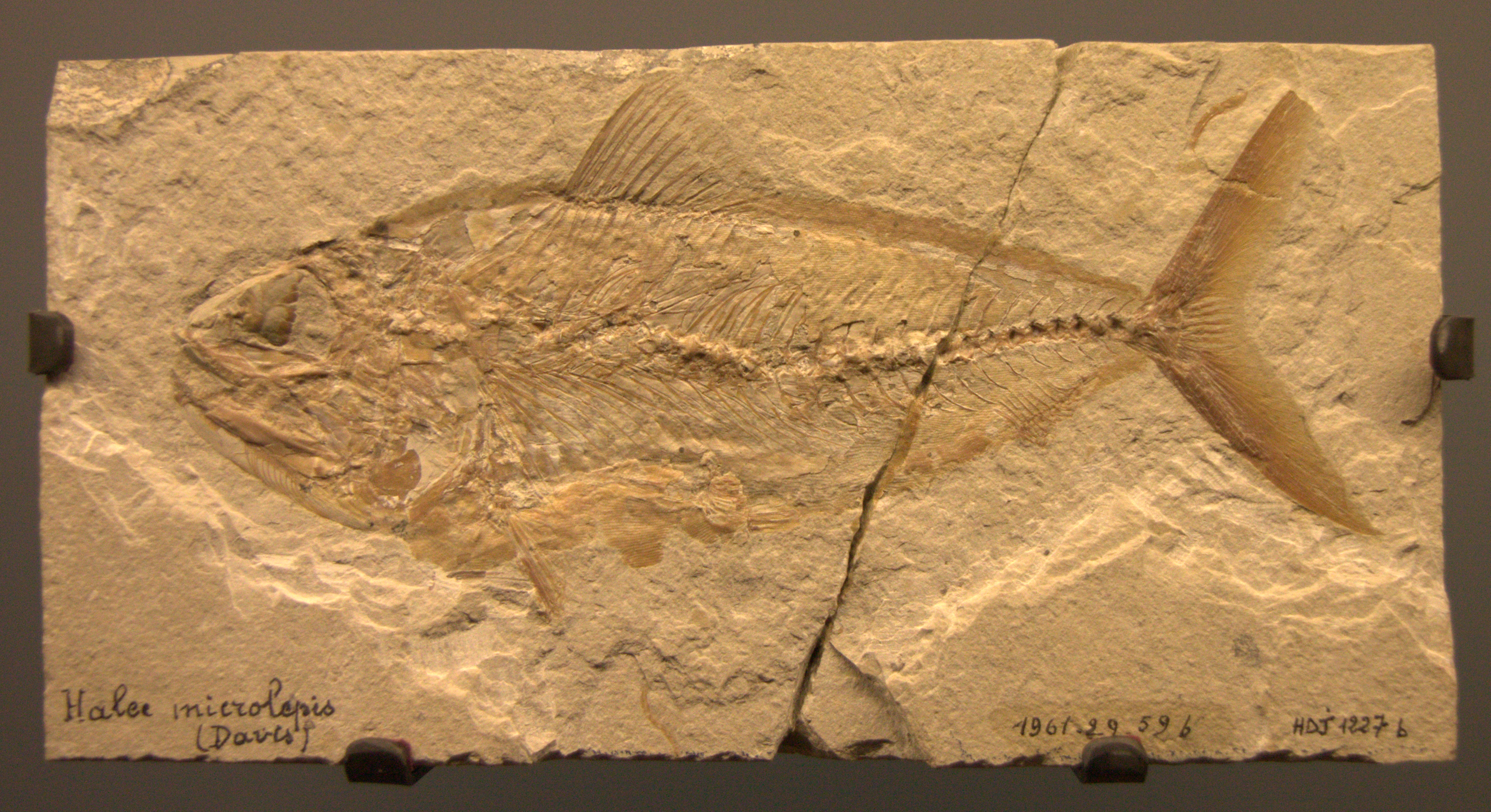
- Phylactocephalus microlepis

Scientific classification
- Kingdom: Animalia
- Phylum: Chordata
- Class: Actinopterygii
- Order: Aulopiformes
- Suborder: †Enchodontoidei
- Family: †Halecidae; Agassiz, 1834

Genera
- †Halec; †Phylactocephalus; ? †Hemisaurida

= Halecidae =

Halecidae Temporal range: Cenomanian

Extinct family of ray-finned fish

Halecidae is an extinct family of aulopiform ray-finned fish known from the Cretaceous Period. It is one of the Enchodontoidei, a diverse group of aulopiforms that were dominant marine fish during the Cretaceous Period.

It contains the following genera:

- Family †Halecidae
  - Genus †Halec
  - Genus †Phylactocephalus

The genera Hemisaurida and Serrilepis are also sometimes included in the family, though more recent studies have placed them outside it.
