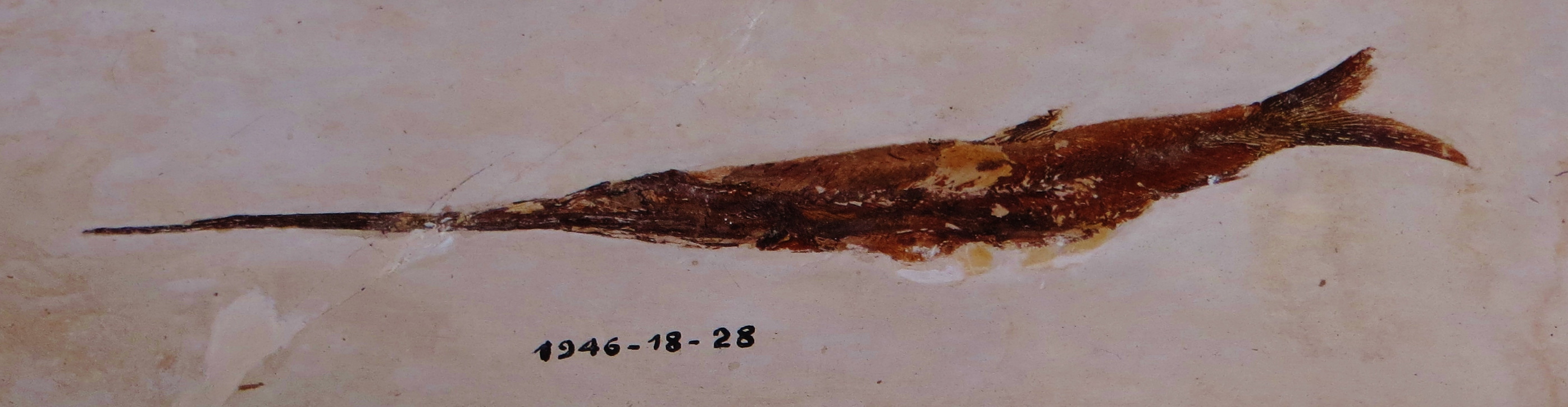
- Specimen of I. damoni
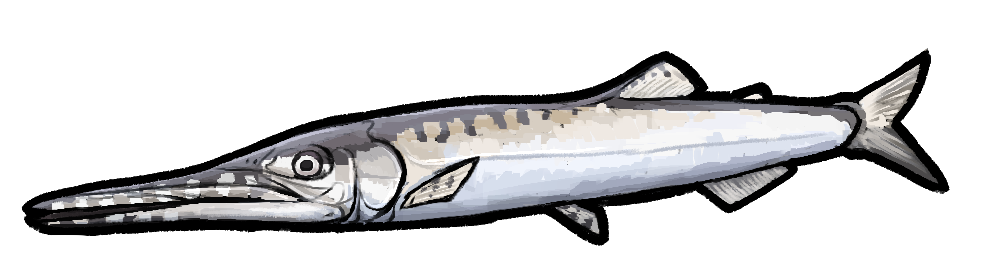
- Life restoration of I. furcata

Scientific classification
- Kingdom: Animalia
- Phylum: Chordata
- Class: Actinopterygii
- Order: Aulopiformes
- Family: †Ichthyotringidae
- Genus: †Ichthyotringa; Cope, 1878

Type species
- †Ichthyotringa tenuirostris Cope, 1878

Species
- See text

Synonyms
- Rhinellus Agassiz, 1844 (preocc.)

= Ichthyotringa =

Ichthyotringa Temporal range: Albian to Maastrichtian

Extinct genus of ray-finned fishes

Ichthyotringa is an extinct genus of marine aulopiform ray-finned fish from Cretaceous-aged marine strata of the Middle East, Europe, and North America. Ichthyotringa are characterized by a slender, highly elongated beak that accounts for a third of the fish's length.

== Taxonomy ==
The following species are known:

- I. africana Arambourg, 1954 - Cenomanian to Turonian of Morocco (Jbel Tselfat), Italy including Sicily (Scaglia Rossa Formation) & Germany (Hesseltal Formation)
- ?I. cuneata Schwarzhans, Stringer & Welton, 2022 [otolith] - late Albian of Texas, US (Pawpaw Formation)
- I. damoni (Davis, 1887) - Santonian of Lebanon (Sahel Alma)
- I. delicata (Hay, 1903) - Cenomanian of Lebanon (Sannine Formation)
- I. mexicana Fielitz & González Rodríguez, 2008 - late Albian of Mexico (El Doctor Formation)
- I. ferox (Davis, 1887) - Santonian of Lebanon (Sahel Alma)
- I. furcata (Agassiz, 1844) - Santonian of Lebanon (Sahel Alma), Campanian of Germany (Ahlen Formation)
- I. pindica Argyriou, Alexopoulos, Carrillo-Briceño & Cavin, 2022 - Maastrichtian of Gavdos, Greece (Pindos Unit)
- ?I. tavernei (Nolf & Stringer, 1996) [otolith] - Maastrichtian of Mississippi (Ripley Formation) & Maryland (Severn Formation), US, the Netherlands (Maastricht Formation) and India (Intertrappean Beds) (="genus Osteoglossidarum" tavernei Nolf & Stringer, 1996)
- ?I. tenuirostris Cope, 1878 (type species) - allegedly Late Cretaceous of South Dakota & Nebraska, US, but provenance uncertain and may represent a mislabeled specimen originating from Lebanon

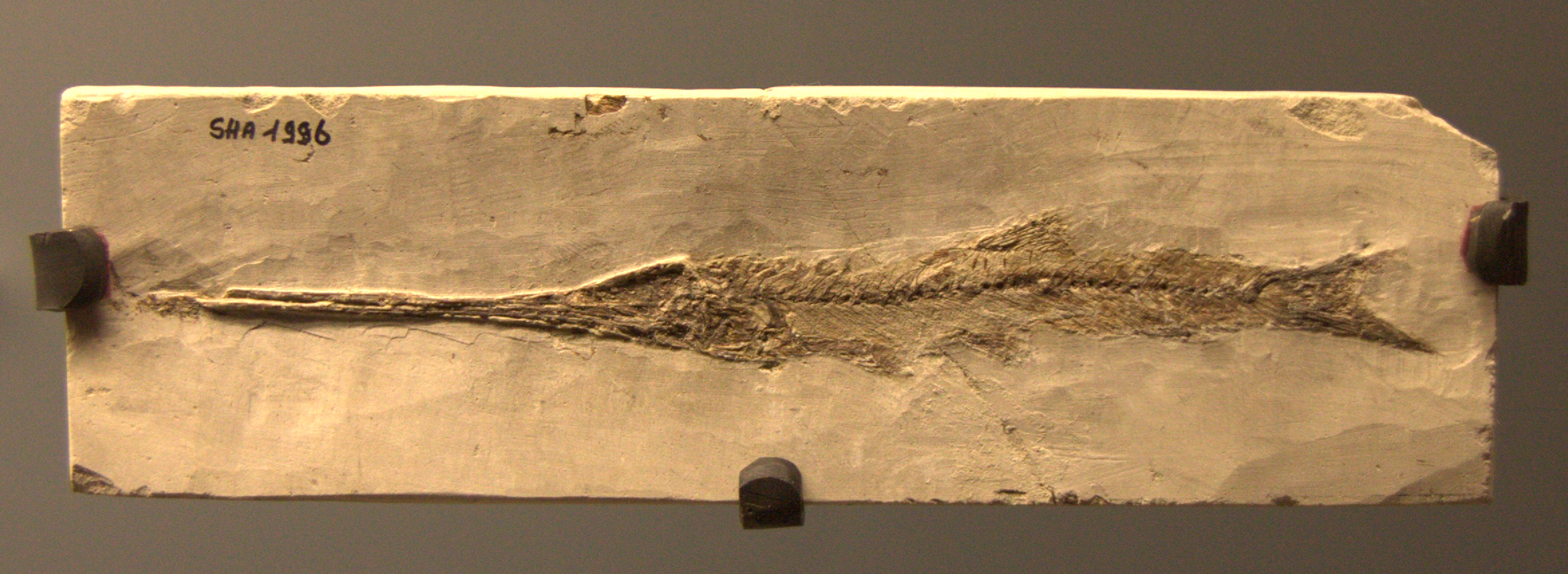
Fossil

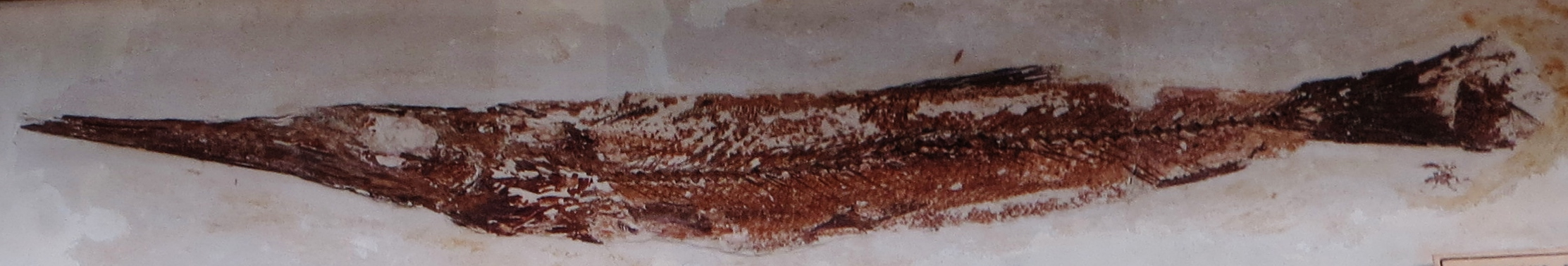
Specimen of I. ferox

Two species known only from otoliths are placed in this genus with some uncertainty, I. cuneata & I. tavernei. These otoliths were previously thought to have a similar morphotype to osteoglossiform fishes until well-preserved otoliths verifiable as the related genus Apateodus were described. The otoliths from these taxa closely resembled but were distinct from Apateodus, causing them to be tentatively placed in the related genus Ichthyotringa.

The original name for the genus, coined by Louis Agassiz, was Rhinellus, with the type species Rhinellus furcatus from Germany and Lebanon. In 1878, Edward Drinker Cope coined the genus Ichthyotringa for specimens of a similar fish (I. tenuirostris) allegedly recovered from the Niobrara Formation of South Dakota and Nebraska. Later on, Agassiz's Rhinellus was found to be preoccupied by a synonym of the toad genus Rhinella, and thus Cope's Ichthoytringa had precedence as the proper genus name. However, Cope's Ichthyotringa tenuirostris may not originate from North America, as he had not personally found the specimens and efforts by him & others to find the type locality were unsuccessful, and no other skeletons of Ichthyotringa have been identified from the United States. Later analyses have found the composition of the rock surrounding the specimens to be reminiscent of the Sahel Alma site in Lebanon, and unlike any Niobrara deposit, making it likely that it represents a mislabeled specimen from Lebanon.

== Paleoecology ==
Ichthyotringa largely appears to have inhabited warm surface waters, although the Sahel Alma locality, where many Ichthyotringa species are found, was a deepwater habitat. It appears to have been predated on by larger fish, with one specimen of the predatory fish Protostomias from Morocco having the skeleton of an Ichthyotringa in its stomach.
