= Lepidenteron =

Lepidenteron Temporal range: Triassic–Miocene

Trace fossil classification
- Kingdom: Animalia
- Phylum: Annelida
- Class: Polychaeta
- Ichnogenus: †Lepidenteron; Frič, 1878

Type ichnospecies
- †?Muraena lewesiensis Mantell, 1822

Species
- See text

Lepidenteron is a trace fossil, usually interpreted as a burrow of a polychaete worm, found in marine geological formations from the Triassic to the Miocene.

== Taxonomy ==
It contains the following species, all of which can be diagnosed by the composition and structure of their burrows:

- Lepidenteron lewesiensis (Mantell, 1822) (type species) - burrow lined in fossil fish material (primarily Late Cretaceous of Europe) (=Lepidenteron longissimus Frič, 1878)
- Lepidenteron cancellata (Bather, 1911) - burrow lined in sediment
- Lepidenteron mantelli (Geinitz, 1850) - burrow lined in fossil plant material
- Lepidenteron mortenseni Schwarzhans, Milàn & Carnevale, 2021 - burrow lined in fossil fish material and otoliths (Middle Paleocene of Denmark)
- Lepidenteron variabilis Suhr, 1988 - burrow lined in clasts of both mineral and biotic origin

== Significance ==
The most famous Lepidenteron species is the type species L. lewesiensis. It has a wide stratigraphic range, but the most famous examples of it are from the Late Cretaceous of Europe, during which its burrows are frequent and provide an important sample of the fossil fish fauna of a habitat, even during periods of high oxygenation when fish remains would otherwise easily decay without fossilization. The large size of its prey suggests that L. lewesiensis was made by an actively predatory taxon, likely a eunicid worm akin to the modern Bobbitt worm. The burrows appear as a long tube-like structure lined in fish bones, and can easily be mistaken as a long skeleton of an eel-like fish. Indeed, L. lewesiensis was initially described by Gideon Mantell as a species of moray eel, Muraena lewesiensis. L. mortenseni from the Middle Paleocene of Denmark closely resembles L. lewesiensis but has a more straight burrow shape with less variation in size.

Fossil fish remains identified from L. lewesiensis include those of Beryx, Berycopsis, Dercetis and Osmeroides from the English Chalk. Dercetids especially appear to have frequently fallen prey to them, based on records from England, Poland, Russia, Crimea, and the Netherlands. In L. mortenseni, the fossils of the gissu Pterothrissus? conchaeformis, the brotula Bidenichthys? lapierrei and the grenadier Bobbittichthys have been described.
