= Cyranichthys =

Cyranichthys Temporal range: Cenomanian to Maastrichtian

Scientific classification
- Kingdom: Animalia
- Phylum: Chordata
- Class: Actinopterygii
- Division: Teleostei
- Order: Aulopiformes
- Family: †Dercetidae
- Genus: †Cyranichthys; Taverne, 1987

Type species
- †Dercetis ornatissimus Casier, 1965

Species
- †C. congolensis (Casier, 1965); †C. ornatissimus (Casier, 1965); †C. jagti Taverne & Goolaerts, 2015

Extinct genus of ray-finned fishes

Cyranichthys is an extinct genus of marine ray-finned fish known from the Late Cretaceous of central Africa and western Europe. It was a member of Dercetidae, a group of elongated aulopiforms.

It contains three species:

- †C. congolensis (Casier, 1965) - Cenomanian of the Democratic Republic of the Congo (Kipala Formation) (=Dercetis congolensis Casier, 1965)
- †C. ornatissimus (Casier, 1965) - Cenomanian of the Democratic Republic of the Congo (Kipala Formation) (=Dercetis ornatissimus Casier, 1965)
- †C. jagti Taverne & Goolaerts, 2015 - Maastrichtian of Belgium and the Netherlands (Maastricht Formation)

Previously, this genus was thought to be represented by a single species known from the Cenomanian of the Democratic Republic of the Congo, which was previously classified in Dercetis but placed in its own genus in 1987. However, fossils of the later-described C. jagti confirmed the persistence of the species up to the end of the Cretaceous in Europe. A second Congolese species was later reclassified into this genus as well.

The living animal would have had a gar-like or saury-like appearance, although its closest living relatives are lancetfish and lizardfish.
