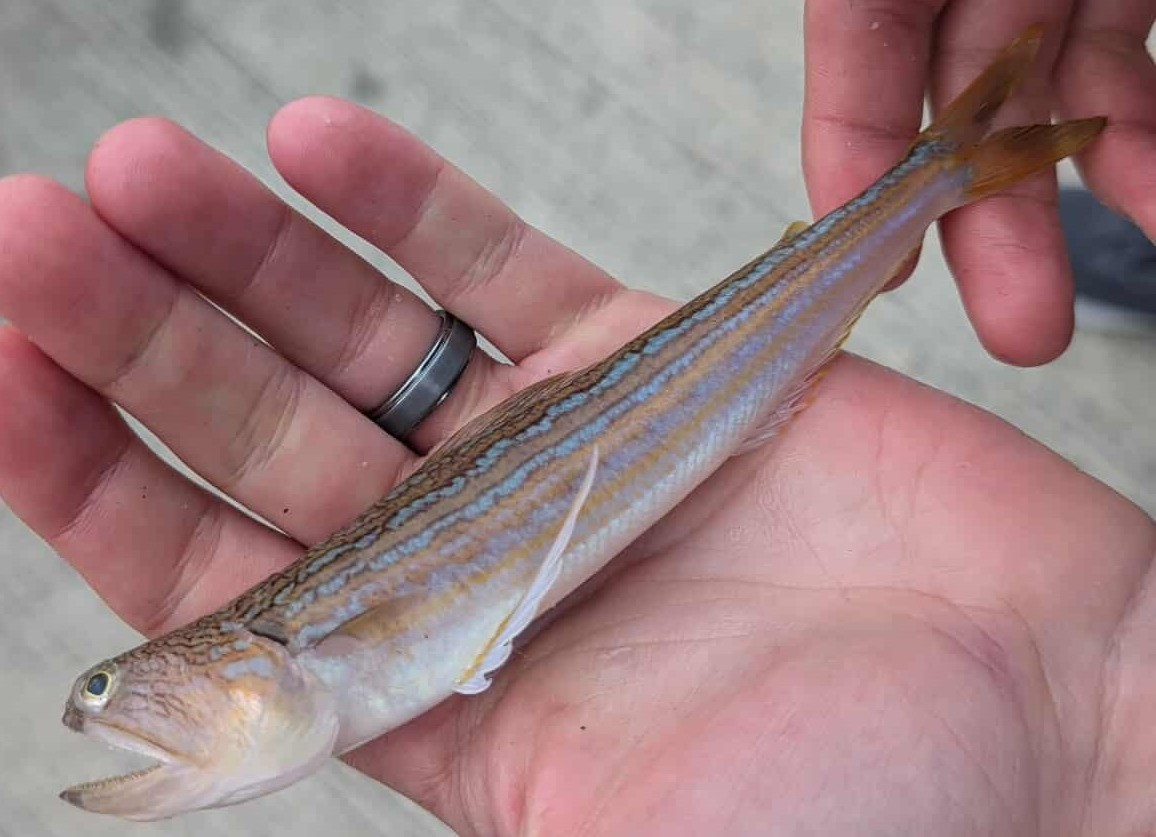
- An individual caught in Japan

Scientific classification
- Kingdom: Animalia
- Phylum: Chordata
- Class: Actinopterygii
- Division: Teleostei
- Order: Aulopiformes
- Family: Synodontidae
- Genus: Trachinocephalus
- Species: T. trachinus

Binomial name
- Trachinocephalus trachinus (Temminck & Schlegel, 1846)

Synonyms
- Saurus trachinus Temmick and Schlegel, 1846

= Trachinocephalus trachinus =

Species of fish

Trachinocephalus trachinus, also known as the Indo-Pacific blunt-nose lizardfish, is a species of fish in the family Synodontidae found in Indo-Pacific. Although previously synonymized with T. myops, Polanco et al. (2016) demonstrated that the two are distinct in the number of lateral-line scales and other meristics, and resurrected T. trachinus for the Indo-Pacific population. This species grows to a length of 40 centimetres (16 in) TL.

== Description ==
Trachinocephalus trachinus is a slender, bottom-dwelling lizardfish with a pointed head and a mouth lined with sharp, conical teeth. The body is elongated and cylindrical, with small cycloid scales that give it a smooth texture. Its coloration typically includes a light tan or brown body with darker blotches and faint horizontal stripes that help it blend into sandy or rubble-covered habitats. Like other lizardfishes, it has a large mouth and forward-facing eyes that support its ambush-predator lifestyle. The dorsal fin is located near the middle of the body, and the species has a small adipose fin near the tail, which is a characteristic feature of the group.

== Distribution and habitat ==
Although originally thought to be widespread, Trachinocephalus trachinus is now recognized as primarily an Indo-Pacific species. The species typically lives on soft substrates where it can bury itself while waiting for prey. Its preferred habitat includes warm to temperate waters where small fishes and invertebrates are abundant.

== Ecology and feeding behavior ==
Trachinocephalus trachinus is an ambush predator, feeding mostly on small fishes and occasionally crustaceans it captures by lunging from the substrate. Its body shape and coloration allow it to remain partially buried in sand, giving it an advantage when hunting unsuspecting prey. The species is known for its rapid striking behavior, which is common among lizardfishes and supported by strong jaw muscles and sharp teeth.
