= Dercetoides =

Dercetoides Temporal range: Early Cenomanian

Scientific classification
- Kingdom: Animalia
- Phylum: Chordata
- Class: Actinopterygii
- Order: Aulopiformes
- Family: †Dercetidae
- Genus: †Dercetoides; Chalifa, 1989
- Species: †D. venator

Binomial name
- †Dercetoides venator Chalifa, 1989

Extinct genus of ray-finned fishes

Dercetoides (meaning "resemblant of Dercetis") is a genus of prehistoric marine ray-finned fish from the Late Cretaceous period. It contains a single species, D. venator, known from the early Cenomanian-aged Amminadav Formation of the West Bank, Palestine. It was a member of the Dercetidae, a group of elongated aulopiforms that were related to modern lancetfish and lizardfish.
