= Trachinocephalus atrisignis =

Conservation status
- Data Deficient (IUCN 3.1)

Scientific classification
- Kingdom: Animalia
- Phylum: Chordata
- Class: Actinopterygii
- Order: Aulopiformes
- Family: Synodontidae
- Genus: Trachinocephalus
- Species: T. atrisignis

Binomial name
- Trachinocephalus atrisignis Prokofiev, 2019

Species of fish

Trachinocephalus atrisignis, commonly known as the black-tipped lizardfish, is a species of lizardfish in the family Synodontidae. This species was described in 2019 by A.M. Prokofiev.

== Description ==
This species reaches a length of 15.0 cm (5.9 in). It has a bluish-grey body with a saturated black spot on the tip of the dorsal fin. The snout length is 62.5-66.7% of the eye diameter, and the lower jaw has a concave dorsal edge that does not protrude beyond the upper jaw. It has 12-13 rays in the pectoral fin, 50-52 scales in the lateral line, and 53-54 vertebrae. It feeds on small invertebrates and other marine organisms.

== Distribution and habitat ==
The species is endemic to the Western Indian Ocean, specifically near Socotra Island. They inhabit tropical waters and are often found near coral reefs.

== Etymology ==
The genus name Trachinocephalus is derived from Greek, with "trachys" meaning rough and "kephale" meaning head. The species name atrisignis is derived from Latin, meaning "black tip", referring to the distinctive black spot on the dorsal fin tip.
