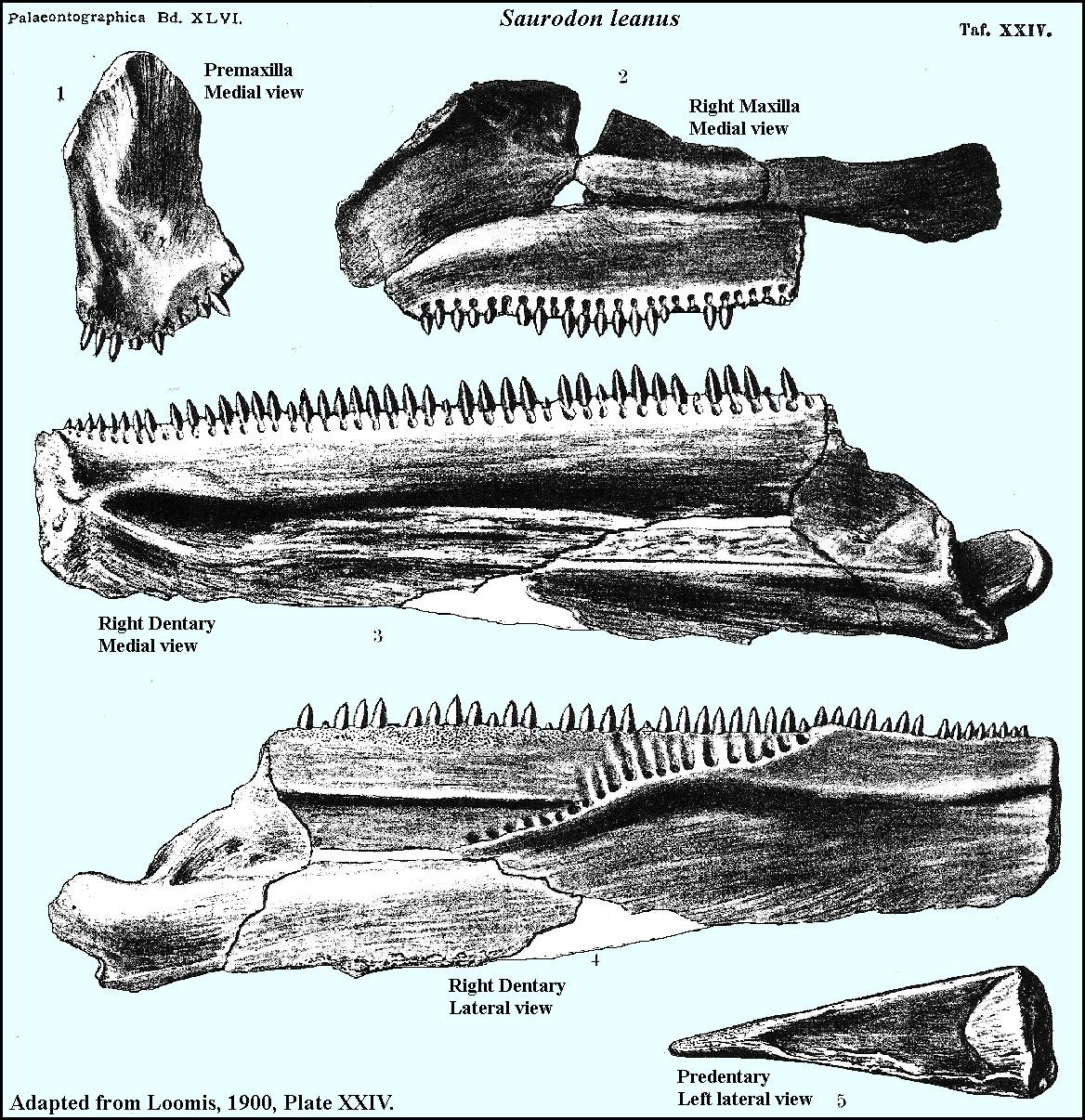
- Part of the skull of AMNH 1906, here labelled as belonging to Saurodon leanus

Scientific classification
- Domain: Eukaryota
- Kingdom: Animalia
- Phylum: Chordata
- Class: Actinopterygii
- Order: †Ichthyodectiformes
- Family: †Ichthyodectidae
- Subfamily: †Saurodontinae
- Genus: †Daptinus; Cope, 1873
- Species: †D. phlebotomus

Binomial name
- †Daptinus phlebotomus (Cope, 1870)

Synonyms
- Saurocephalus phlebotomus? Cope, 1870; Saurodon "phlebotomus" Cope, 1871

= Daptinus =

Daptinus Temporal range: Late Cretaceous, 87–82 Ma (Coniacian-Campanian)

Extinct genus of fishes

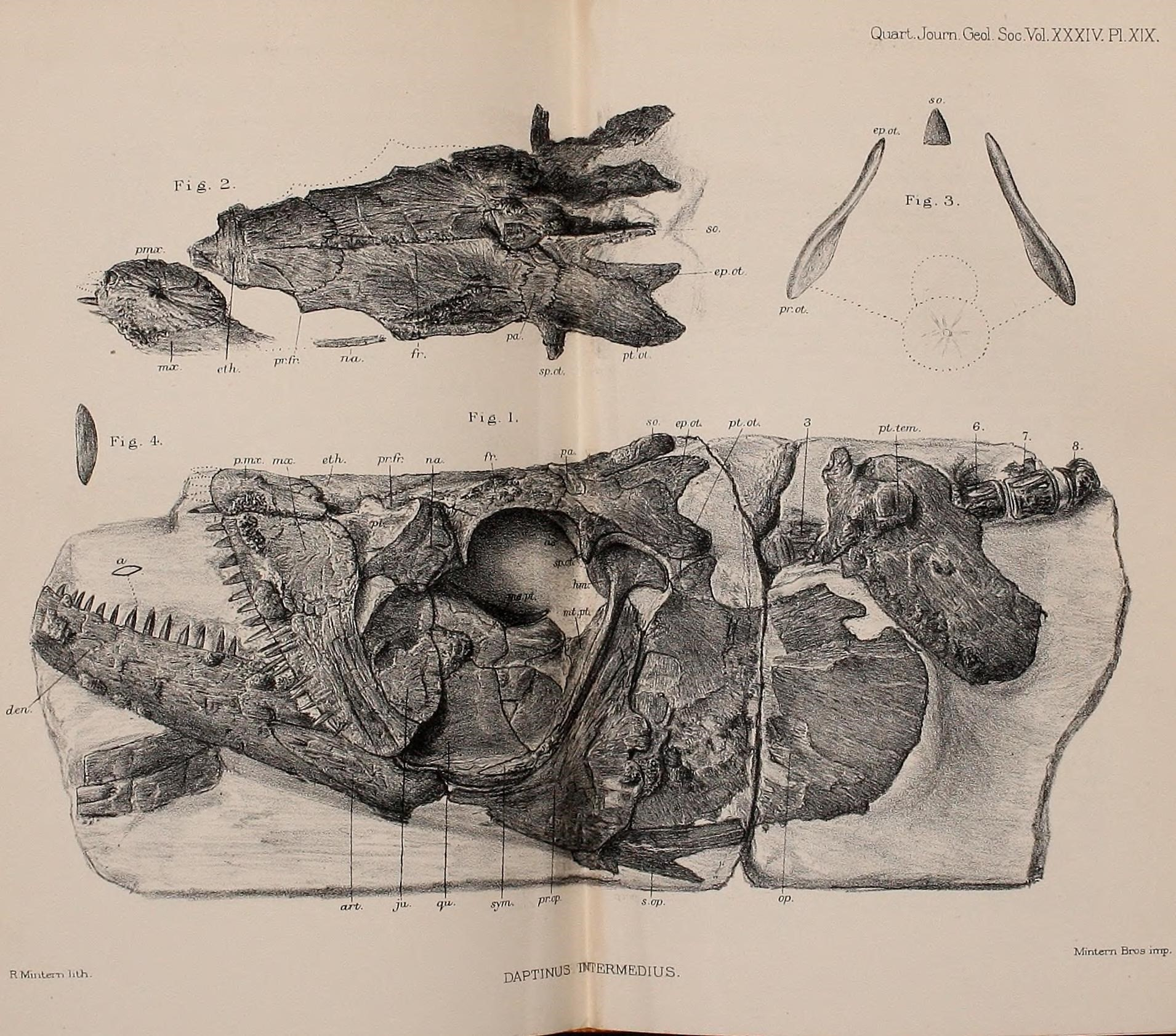
Image 1878 from the Quarterly Journal of the Geological Society of London, labelled Daptinus Intermedius

Daptinus is an extinct genus of ichthyodectid fishes within the subfamily Saurodontinae, from the Late Cretaceous (Coniacian-Campanian) Niobrara Formation of Alabama, that was originally named as a species of Saurocephalus (S. phlebotomus) in 1870 by Edward Drinker Cope, and then became a species of Saurodon in 1871, but was moved to a separate genus in 1873. Subsequent authors listed Daptinus as a tentative, possible synonym of Saurocephalus or Saurodon leanus. The holotype, which is probably the only known specimen discovered to date, is AMNH 1906, which is listed as containing vertebrae (?) and portions of the cranium, the latter including the dentary, maxilla and palate.
