= Trachinocephalus gauguini =

Conservation status
- Least Concern (IUCN 3.1)

Scientific classification
- Kingdom: Animalia
- Phylum: Chordata
- Class: Actinopterygii
- Order: Aulopiformes
- Family: Synodontidae
- Genus: Trachinocephalus
- Species: T. gauguini

Binomial name
- Trachinocephalus gauguini Polanco-F., Acero P., and Betancur-R., 2016

Species of fish

Trachinocephalus gauguini, commonly known as the curious scad, is a species of lizardfish in the family Synodontidae. This species was described in 2016 by F.A. Polanco, P.A. Acero, and R. Betancur-R.

== Description ==
This species reaches a length of 12.5 cm (4.9 in). It has a bluish-grey body with a black mark on the tip of the dorsal fin. The snout length is 62.5-66.7% of the eye diameter, and the lower jaw has a concave dorsal edge that does not protrude beyond the upper jaw. It has 12-13 rays in the pectoral fin, 50-52 scales in the lateral line, and 53-54 vertebrae. It feeds on small invertebrates and other marine organisms.

== Distribution and habitat ==
Endemic to the Marquesas Islands in the eastern central Pacific Ocean. They inhabit tropical waters and are often found near coral reefs.

== Etymology ==
The genus name Trachinocephalus is derived from Greek, with "trachys" meaning rough and "kephale" meaning head. The species name gauguini is in honor of the French painter Paul Gauguin (1848-1903), who died in the Marquesas Islands on May 8, 1903.
