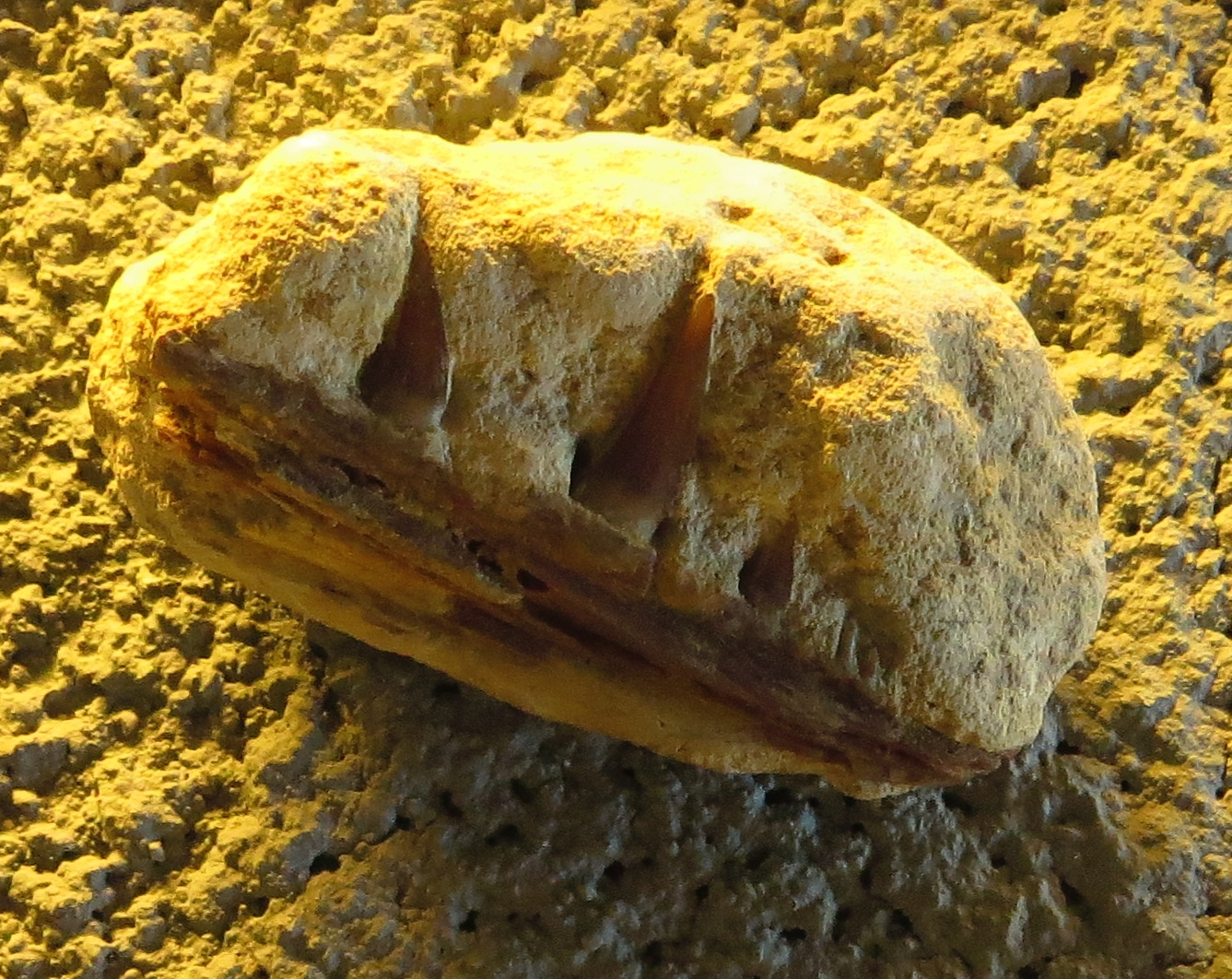
- Lower jaw fragment of A. corneti

Scientific classification
- Kingdom: Animalia
- Phylum: Chordata
- Class: Actinopterygii
- Order: Aulopiformes
- Family: †Ichthyotringidae
- Genus: †Apateodus; Woodward, 1901

Type species
- †Pachyrhizodus glyphodus Blake, 1863

Species
- See text

= Apateodus =

Apateodus Temporal range: Late Albian - Maastrichtian

Extinct genus of ray-finned fishes

Apateodus (meaning "confusing tooth") is a genus of prehistoric marine ray-finned fish which was described by Woodward in 1901. It was a relative of modern lizardfish and lancetfish in the order Aulopiformes, and one of a number of prominent nektonic aulopiforms of Cretaceous marine ecosystems.

The genus spans from the Albian to the late Maastrichtian, and appears to have been distributed worldwide; specimens have been found in Russia, India, the United States (Colorado, South Dakota, Iowa, Kansas), Canada, the United Kingdom and the Netherlands.

== Taxonomy ==
Apateodus has generally been placed in the suborder Enchodontoidei alongside most other Cretaceous nektonic aulopiforms, although its affinities have long been uncertain. However, since the 2000s, it has generally been placed in the family Ichthyotringidae. However, some authors have still placed it as an indeterminate enchodontoid, ichthyotringoid, alepisauroid, or even elsewhere in the Aulopiformes as the sister to the barracudinas, the latter two of which have been contradicted by anatomical studies.

The following species are known:

- †?A. assisi Schwarzans, Huddlestone & Takeuchi, 2018 - Santonian of Alabama, USA (Eutaw Formation) [otolith]
- †A. busseni Franz & Shimada, 2009 - Coniacian of Kansas, USA (Smoky Hill Chalk)
- †A. corneti (Forir, 1887) - Maastrichtian of the Netherlands (Maastricht Formation)
- †A. crenellatus Schwarzans & Stringer, 2020 - Maastrichtian of Mississippi, USA [otolith] (Owl Creek Formation)
- †A. glyphodus (Blake, 1863) (type species) - Albian of the United Kingdom (Folkestone Formation)
- †A. lanceolatus Woodward, 1901 - Cenomanian of the United Kingdom (English Chalk)
- †A. striatus Woodward, 1901 - Cenomanian of the United Kingdom (English Chalk), Cenomanian-Turonian of Germany (Hesseltal Formation), Maastrichtian of India (Intertrappean Beds)

Indeterminate remains are known from the Turonian of Canada (Kaskapau Formation of Alberta), the Albian of Russia (Belgorod), and the Cenomanian to Santonian of the United States (Greenhorn Limestone of Colorado & Iowa, Carlile Shale of Kansas, and the Niobrara Formation of South Dakota). A potential undescribed genus closely allied to Apateodus was identified in 2020 from fossils from Kansas.

== Description ==
Known by well preserved skull remains, Apateodus is estimated to be around 1 meter (3.3 ft) in length, and would have been an effective mesopredator.
