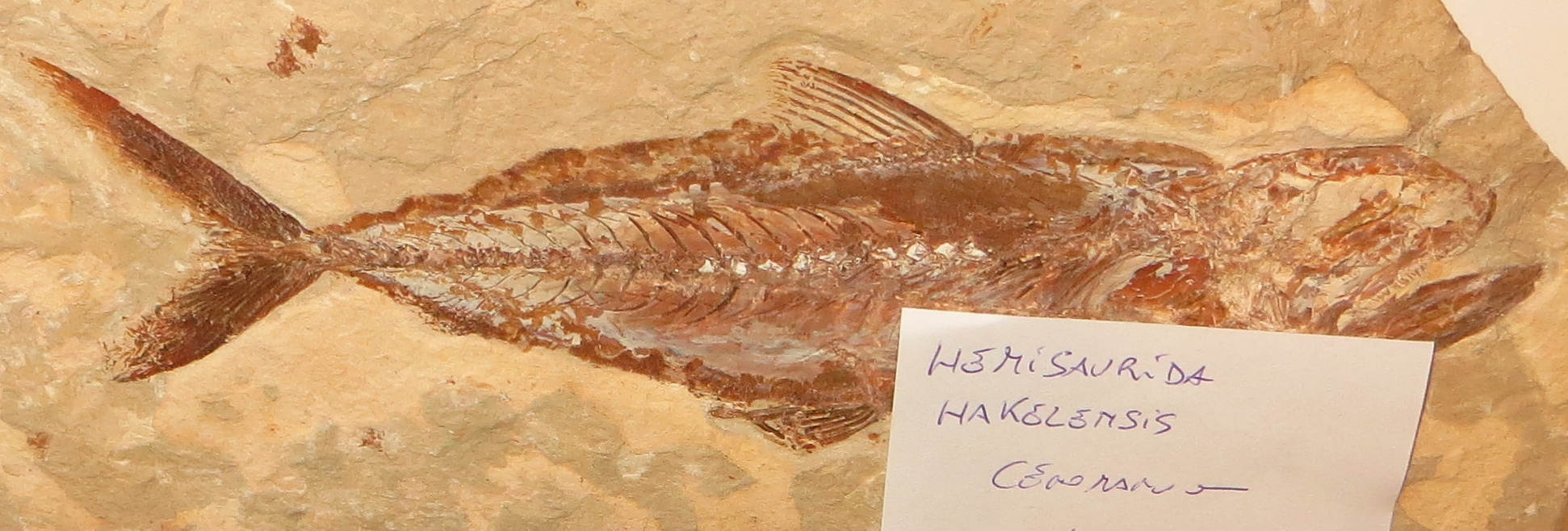
- Specimen of H. hakelensis, Malmerendi Museum of Natural Science

Scientific classification
- Kingdom: Animalia
- Phylum: Chordata
- Class: Actinopterygii
- Order: Aulopiformes
- Suborder: †Enchodontoidei
- Genus: †Hemisaurida; Kner, 1867

Species
- H. hakelensis Goody, 1969; H. neocomiensis Kner, 1867

= Hemisaurida =

Hemisaurida Temporal range: Cenomanian

Extinct genus of ray-finned fishes

Hemisaurida is an extinct genus of prehistoric marine aulopiform ray-finned fish, known from Late Cretaceous fossils found in Europe and the Middle East.

The following species are known:

- H. hakelensis Goody, 1969 - Cenomanian of Lebanon (Sannine Formation)
- H. neocomiensis Kner, 1867 (type species) - Cenomanian of Slovenia (Komen Limestone)

Previously placed in the family Halecidae, more recent studies have found it to likely not belong to that family, and it may occupy a more basal position within the Enchodontoidei.
