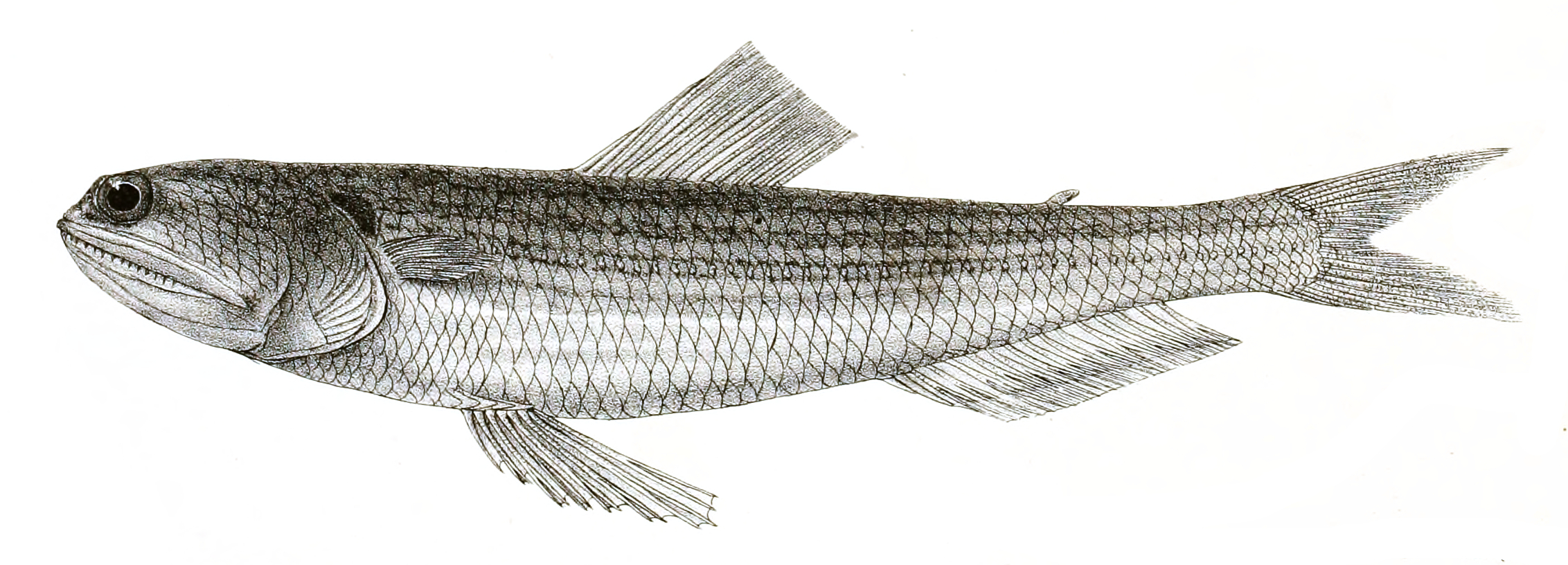

Conservation status
- Least Concern (IUCN 3.1)

Scientific classification
- Kingdom: Animalia
- Phylum: Chordata
- Class: Actinopterygii
- Order: Aulopiformes
- Family: Synodontidae
- Genus: Trachinocephalus
- Species: T. myops

Binomial name
- Trachinocephalus myops (J. R. Forster, 1801)

Synonyms
- Synodus myops Forster, 1801

= Trachinocephalus myops =

Species of fish

Trachinocephalus myops, the blunt-nose lizardfish, is a species of fish in the family Synodontidae found in Atlantic Ocean. This species grows to a length of 40 centimetres (16 in) TL. It has been discovered that the species has two peaks in its spawning season, from February to April and from August to October. This suggests that their reproductive activity is suitable for the different environments the species utilizes.
