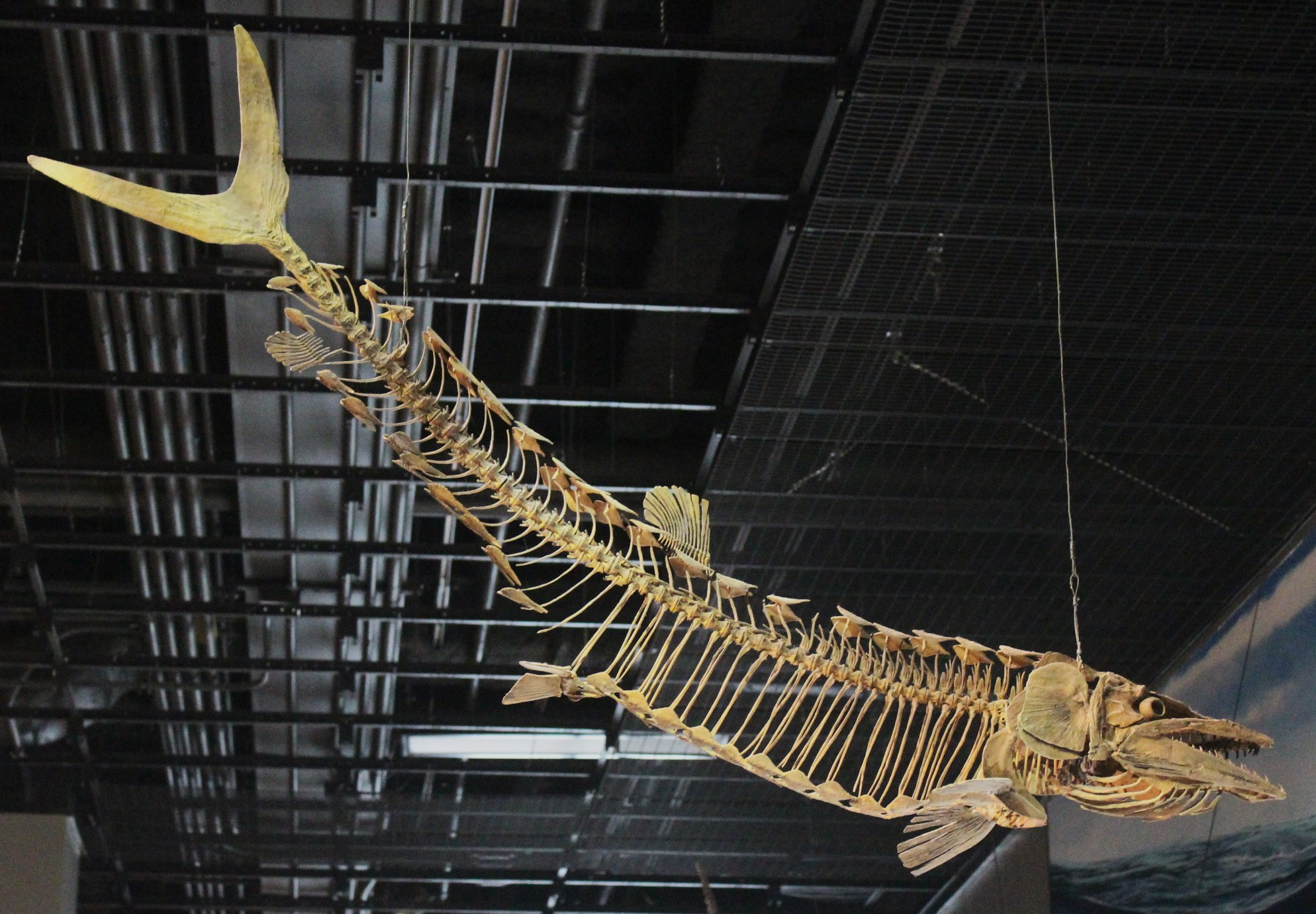
- C. nepaholica mount, University of Michigan Museum of Natural History

Scientific classification
- Domain: Eukaryota
- Kingdom: Animalia
- Phylum: Chordata
- Class: Actinopterygii
- Order: Aulopiformes
- Superfamily: †Cimolichthyoidea
- Family: †Cimolichthyidae; Goody, 1969
- Genus: †Cimolichthys; Leidy, 1857

Type species
- †Cimolichthys levesiensis Leidy, 1857

Species
- †C. levesiensis Leidy, 1857; †C. nepaholica Cope, 1872

Synonyms
- †Plinthophorus Günther, 1864

= Cimolichthys =

Cimolichthys Temporal range: Late Cenomanian to Maastrichtian

Extinct genus of ray-finned fishes

Cimolichthys (Greek for "chalk fish") is an extinct genus of large predatory marine aulopiform ray-finned fish known worldwide from the Late Cretaceous. It is the only member of the family Cimolichthyidae.

== Taxonomy ==
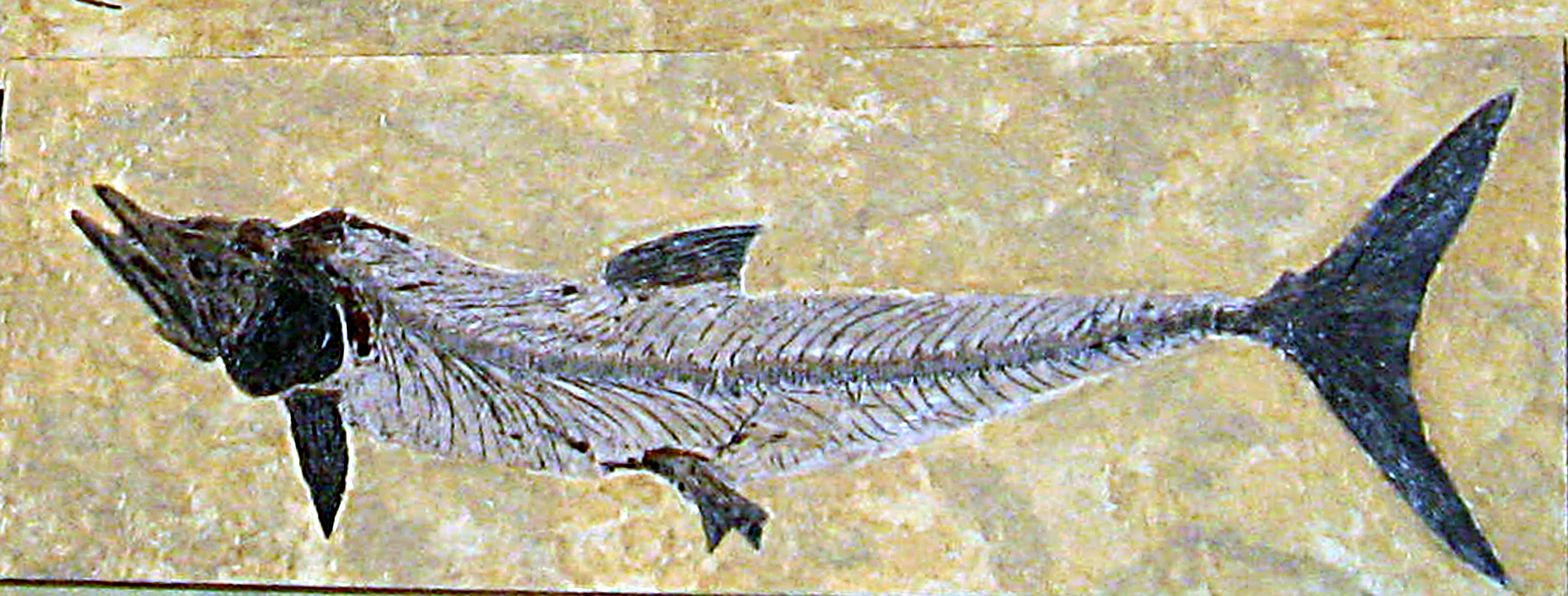
C. nepaholica specimen, Denver Museum of Nature and Science

Cimolichthys was a large-sized nektonic aulopiform fish, making it related to modern lancetfish and lizardfish. Within the Aulopiformes, it is generally considered a member of the Enchodontoidei, a dominant group of predatory nektonic fish throughout much of the Cretaceous; however, some other treatments instead place it outside the Enchodontoidei and in a basal position as sister to the waryfishes, a small family of extant deep-sea aulopiformes. Yet other studies have instead placed it as a sister to the extant daggertooths.

The following species are known:

- †C. levesiensis Leidy, 1857 - Cenomanian of England (English Chalk), late Cenomanian/early Turonian of Germany (Hesseltal Formation), possibly Turonian of Canada (Kaskapau Formation)
- †C. nepaholica Cope, 1872 - Turonian to Campanian of Canada (Vermilion River Formation of Manitoba, Northwest Territories), Cenomanian to Maastrichtian of the United States (Mooreville Chalk of Alabama, Greenhorn Limestone of Colorado, Niobrara Formation of Kansas & South Dakota), and Maastrichtian of the Netherlands & Belgium (both Maastricht Formation)

C. anceps, C. gladiolus, C. semianceps, C. contracta, C. merillii, and C. sulcatus, all described by Cope (1872), are now considered synonymous with C. nepaholica. Indeterminate remains are known from the Maastrichtian of Niger & Brazil, and the Turonian of the Czech Republic.

== Description ==
Although the closest living relatives of Cimolichthys are lancetfish and lizardfish, the living animals would have resembled very large pikes. They could grow up to 1.5 to 2.0 metres (4.9 to 6.6 ft) meters long. Their bodies were covered by large, heavy scutes. Typical of this species are narrow lower jaws with several series of teeth. Remains of undigested fishes or squids have been found in collected specimens. Particularly well-preserved specimens are known from the Niobrara Formation of Kansas. Their barbed teeth are distinctive, and can identify the presence of this genus even in formations where articulated remains are not otherwise known.

== Gallery ==
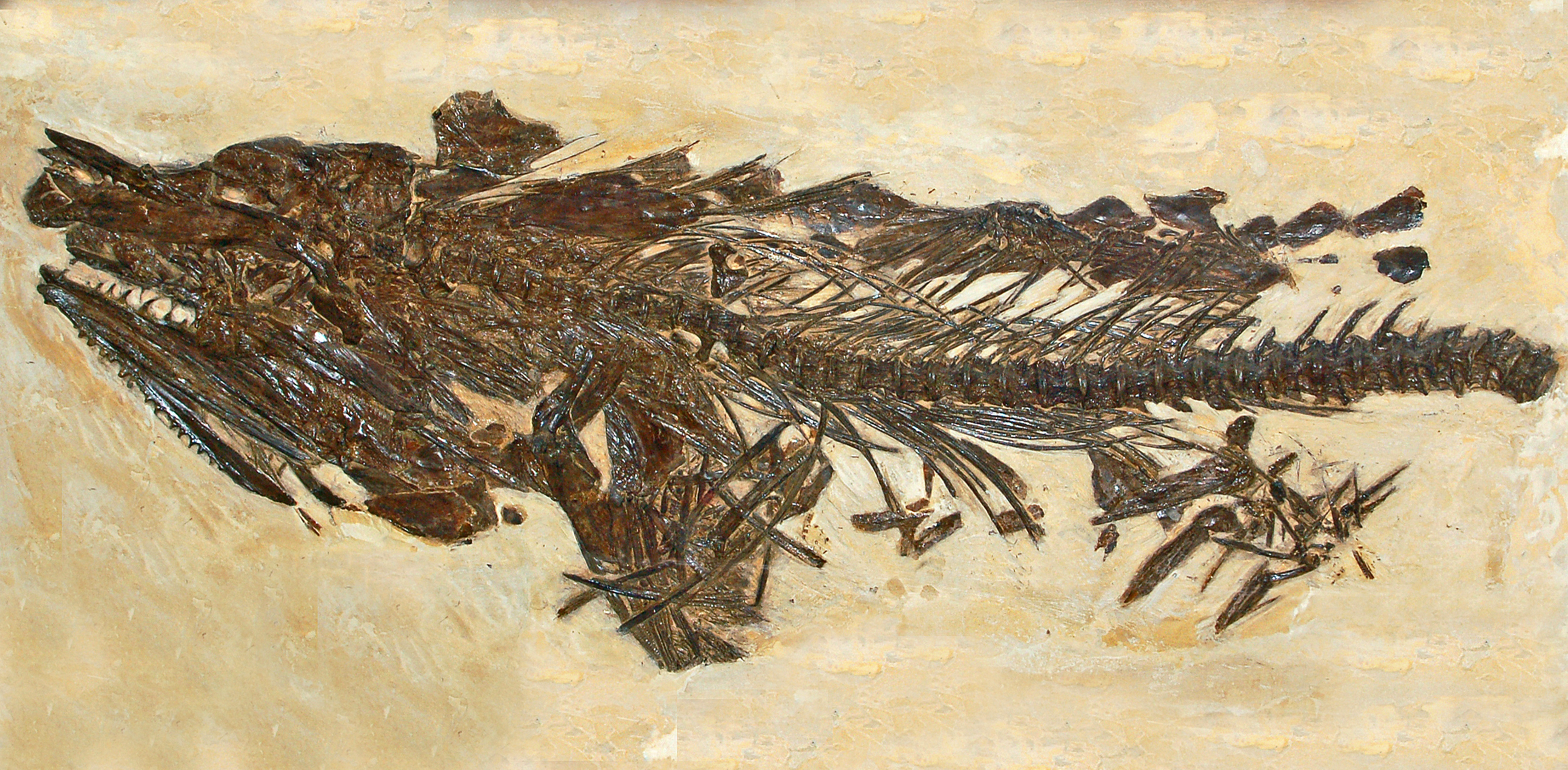
Cimolichthys at the Canadian Museum of Nature, Ottawa

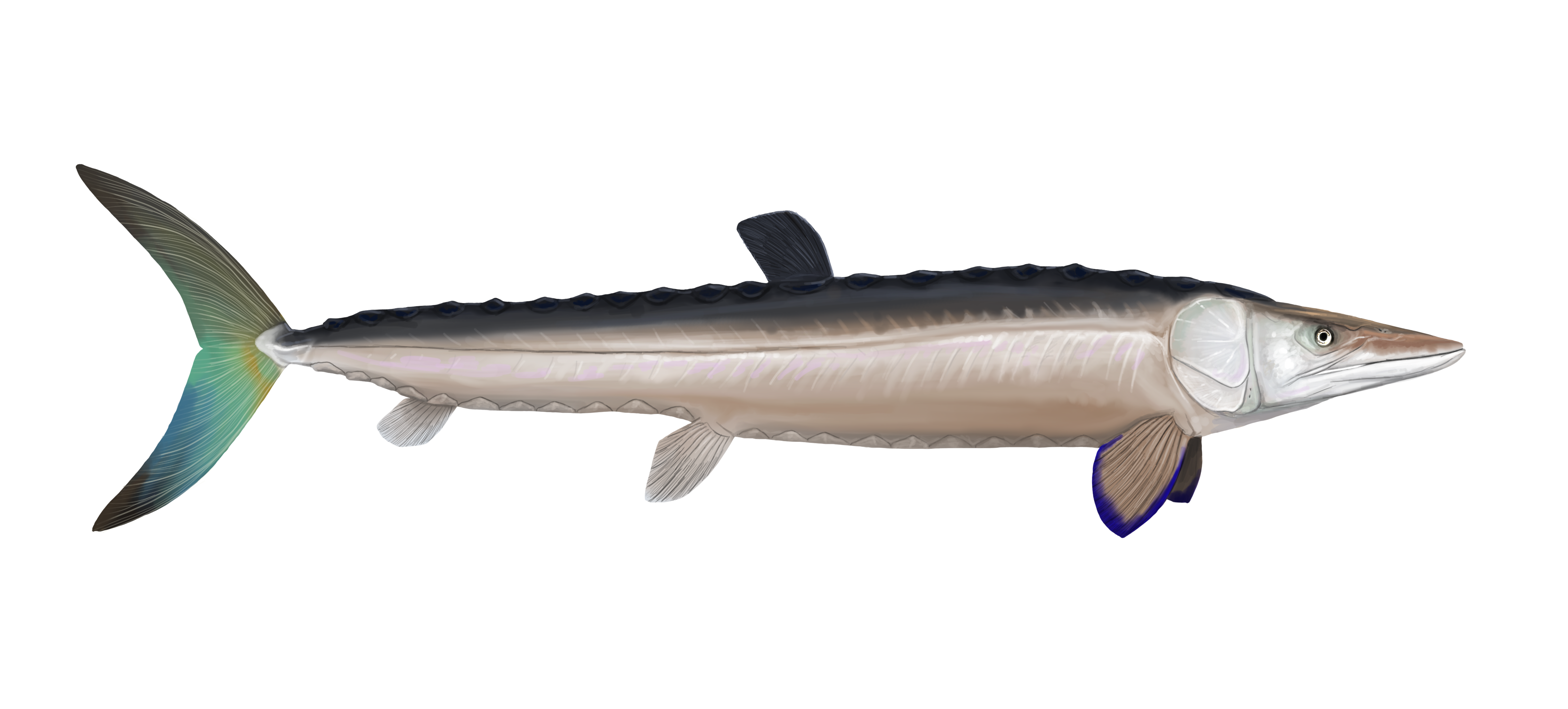
Restoration of Cimolichthys nepaholica.
