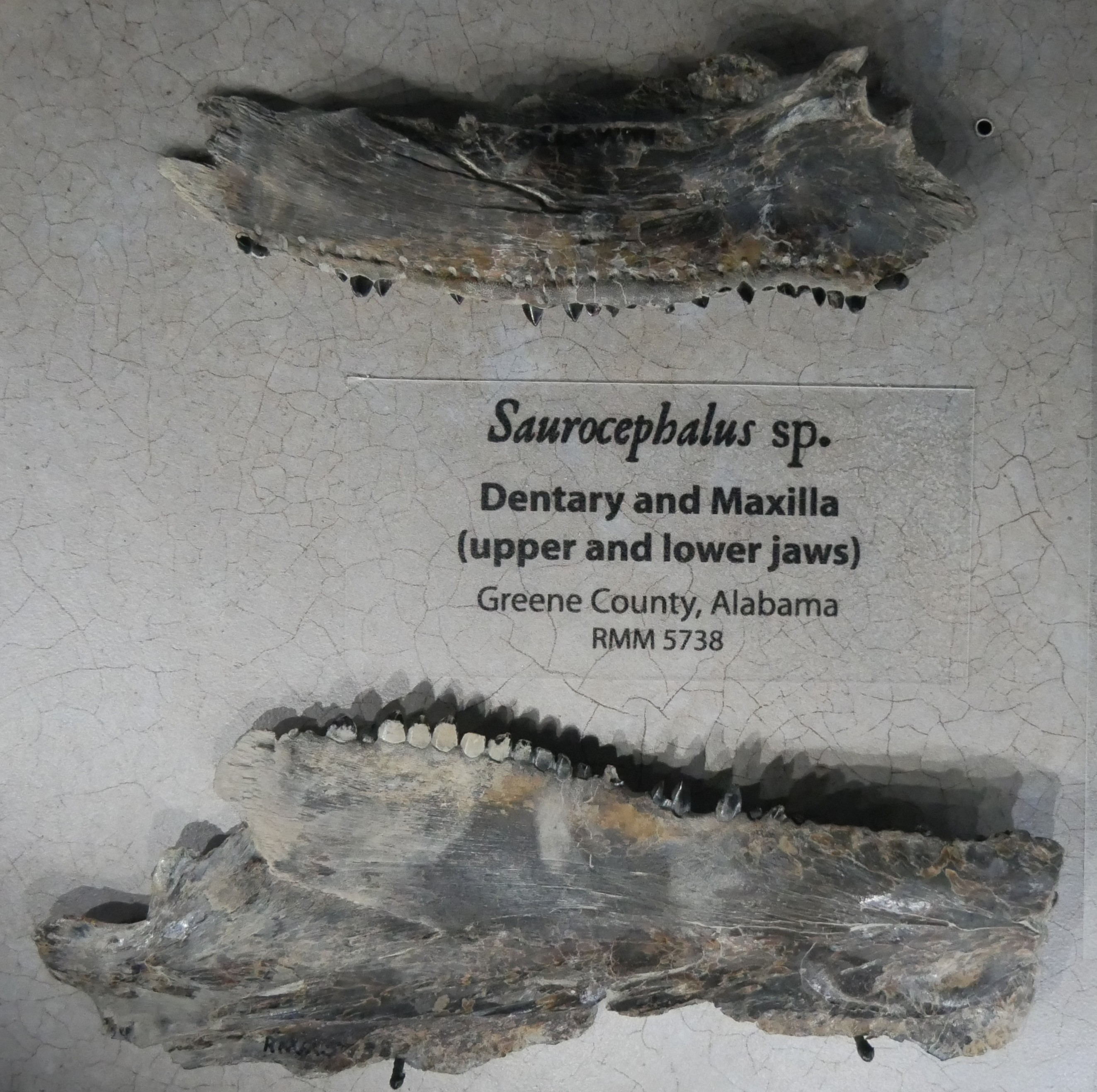
- Maxilla and Dentary, McWane Science Center

Scientific classification
- Domain: Eukaryota
- Kingdom: Animalia
- Phylum: Chordata
- Class: Actinopterygii
- Order: †Ichthyodectiformes
- Family: †Saurodontidae
- Genus: †Saurocephalus; Harlan, 1824

Type species
- †Saurocephalus lanciformis Harlan, 1824

Other species
- †S. albensis Jaccard, 1869; †S. arapahovius Cope, 1872; †S. broadheadi Stewart, 1898; †S. dentatus Stewart, 1898; †S. dispar Hebert, 1855; †S. fayumensis? Tawadros, 2001; †S. ferox Stewart, 1898; †S. inaequalis Münster, 1846; †S. inflexus Jaccard, 1869; †S. longicorpus Kaddumi, 2009; †S. pamphagus Hay, 1899; †S. phlebotomus? Cope, 1870; †S. pygmaeus Loomis, 1900; †S. woodwardi Davis, 1878; †S. xiphirostris Stewart, 1898

Synonyms
- Daptinus? Cope, 1873; Daptinus phlebotomus? Cope, 1870

= Saurocephalus =

Saurocephalus Temporal range: Early Cretaceous-Early Paleocene

Extinct genus of ray-finned fishes

Saurocephalus (from Greek: σαῦρος saûros, 'lizard' and Greek: κεφαλή kephalḗ 'head') is an extinct genus of ray-finned fishes within the family Saurodontidae. The genus was first described in 1824 and contains six or seven species, including the type species S. lanciformis. Saurocephalus first appeared during the early Valanginian and continued on to the Maastrichtian, where it nearly went extinct. However, the recent discovery of S. lanciformis remains from the earliest Paleocene indicates that it just barely survived into the Cenozoic. This would make it the last surviving ichthyodectiform.

Saurocephalus is almost entirely represented by fragmentary specimens with the exception of a few complete specimens, such as a near-complete specimen of the species S. longicorpus from Jordan. The complete material from Jordan offered an extensive amount of valuable information about Saurocephalus. With an elongate, torpedo-like body, Saurocephalus was extremely fast and it was probably a formidable open-water ambush predator. The morphology of its teeth and jaw structure suggests it was a piscivore. The closely set very sharp, and firmly anchored teeth lined up along the upper and lower jaws acted together like sharp serrated scissors. The ventral extension of the upper jaw deep unto the sides of the lower jaw made the jaws perform like meat slicers. Saurocephalus was a powerful and ferocious predator with a powerful jaw capable of slicing and biting off large chunks of meat from its potential prey items - no doubt, fish was on top of the diet list. To process large prey, it would cut them into smaller, more manageable pieces using its large jaws and serrated teeth. A close modern analogue of Saurocephalus and to the matter, saurodontids, would be barracudas (Sphyraena barracuda), known to ambush, ram, and stun their prey using the strong anterior projection of the dentary. Although not as notably elongate, the overall body outline of barracudas is similar to Saurocephalus.

S. lanciformis fossils are known from the early Danian of the Hornerstown Formation in New Jersey, indicating that they at least briefly survived the Cretaceous-Paleogene extinction event. They appear to have persisted longer into the Danian than other Mesozoic fish that have their youngest records from the formation (Pseudocorax, Ischyodus, Anomoeodus, and Enchodus).

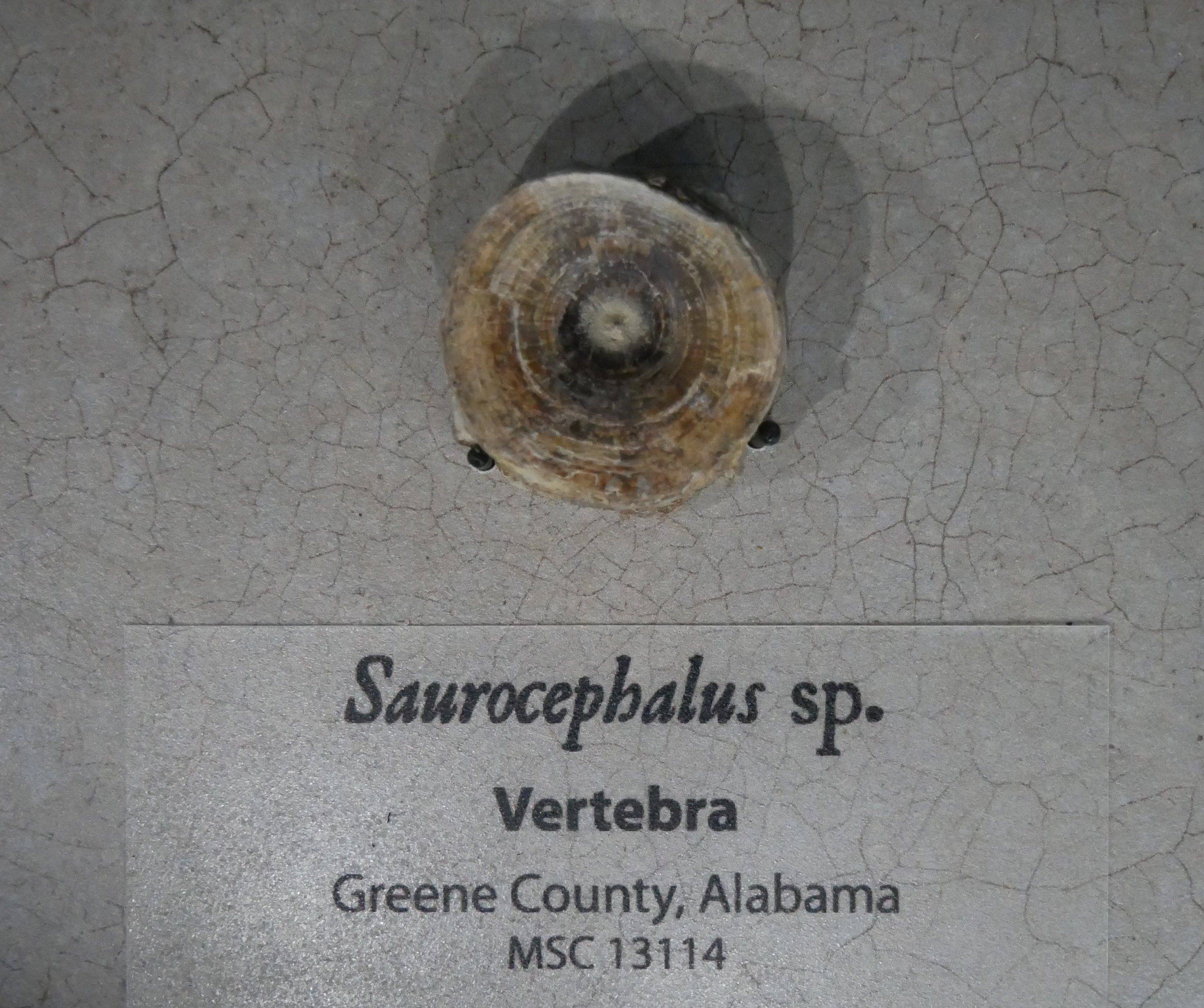
Vertebra

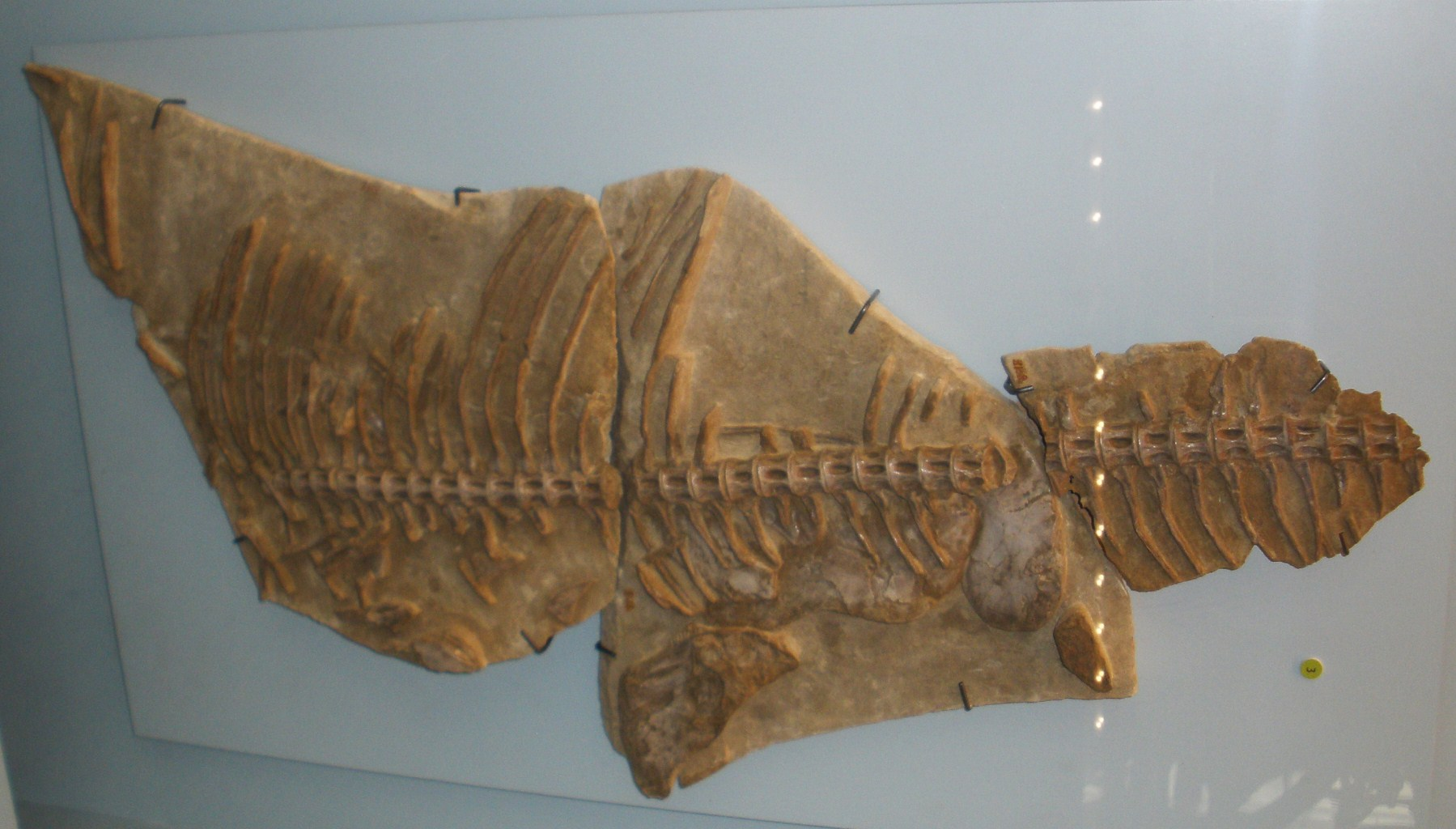
Partial Skeleton

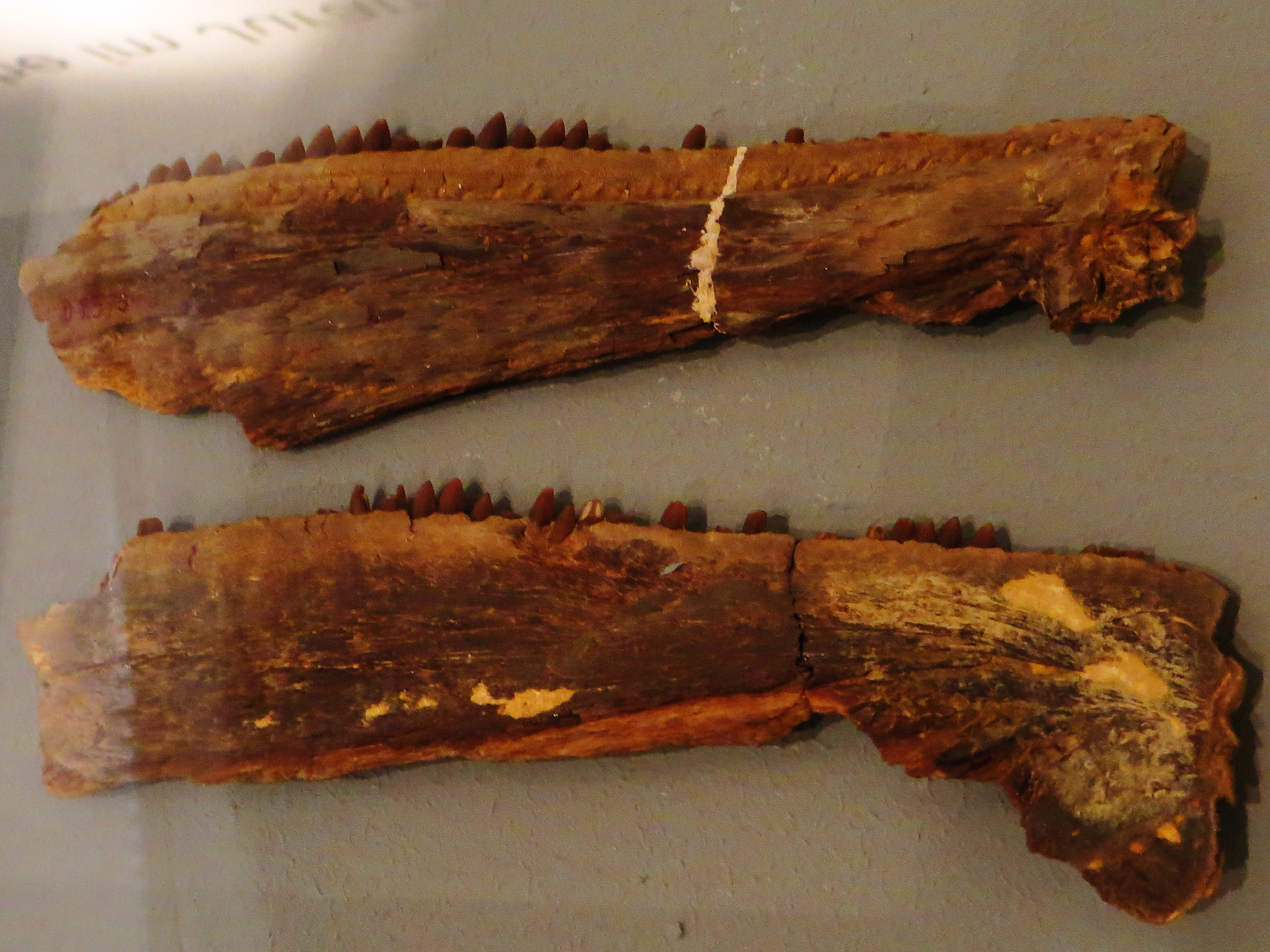
Jaws of S. lanciformis
