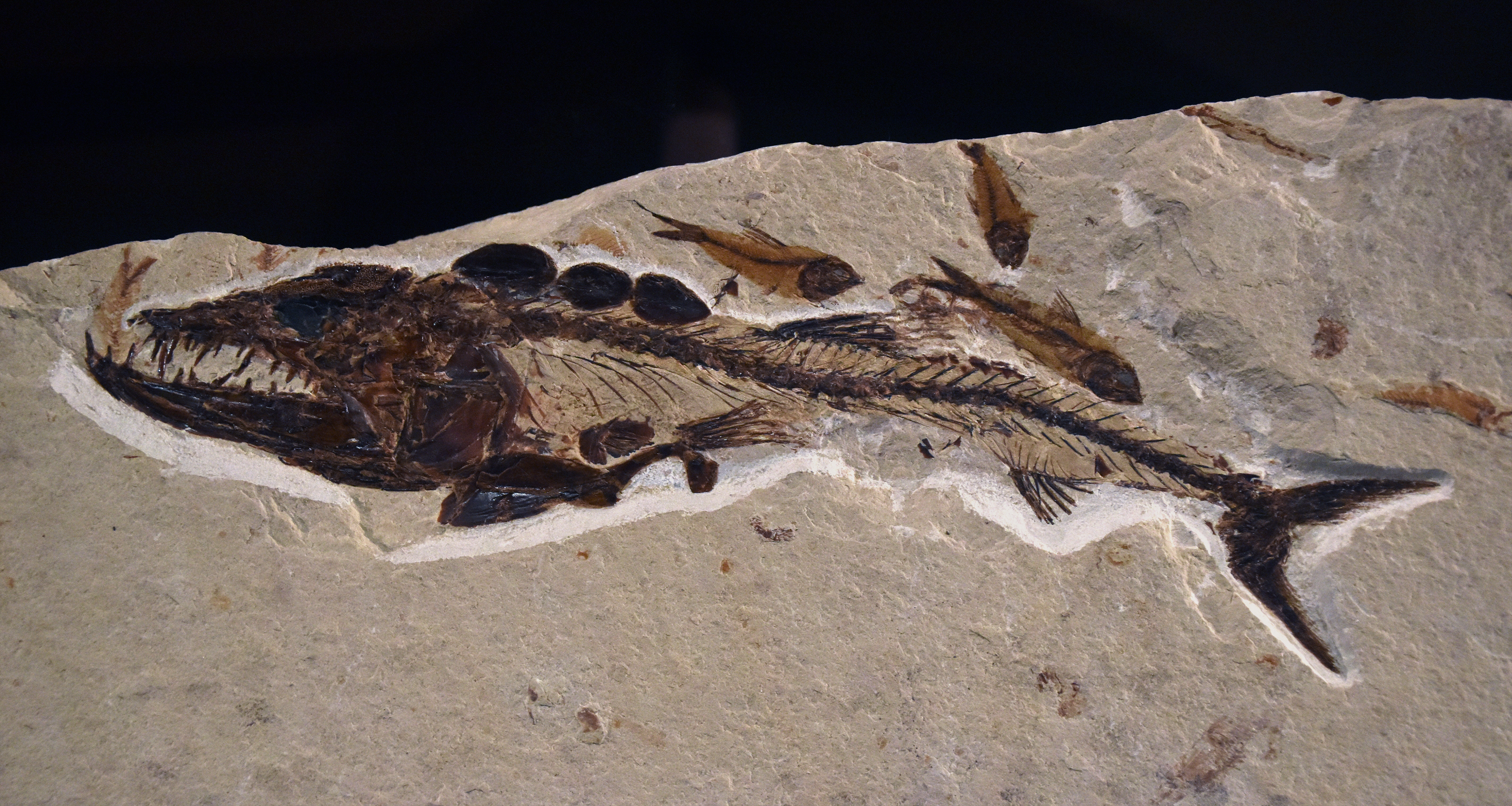
- Specimen of Eurypholis boissieri (Enchodontidae)
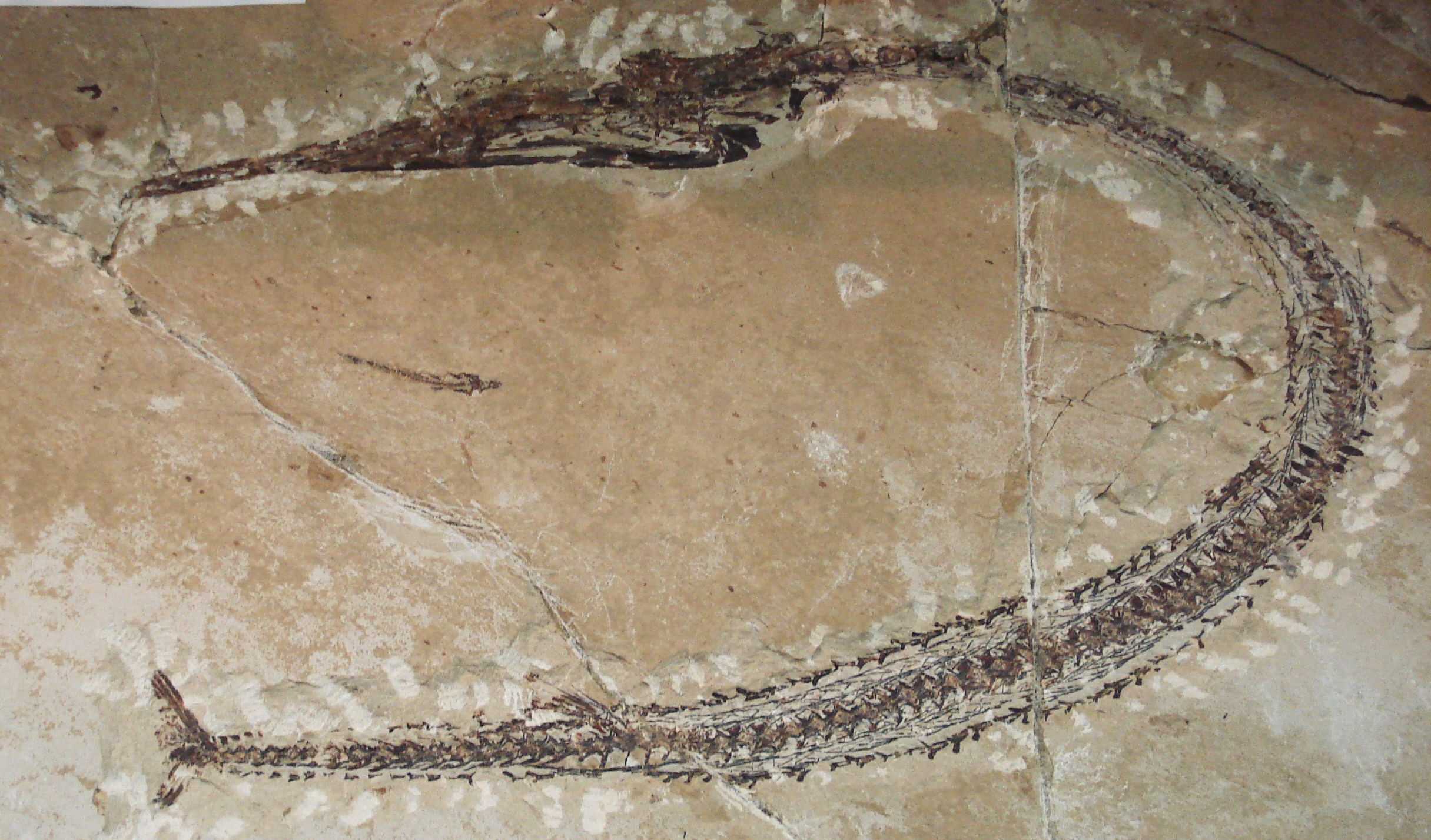
- Specimen of Dercetis serpentinus (Dercetidae)

Scientific classification
- Kingdom: Animalia
- Phylum: Chordata
- Class: Actinopterygii
- Order: Aulopiformes
- Suborder: †Enchodontoidei; Berg, 1937

Families
- See text

= Enchodontoidei =

Enchodontoidei Temporal range: Barremian–Early Eocene

Extinct superorder of aulopiform fish

The Enchodontoidei are an extinct superorder of aulopiform fish known from the Early Cretaceous to the Eocene. They were among the dominant predatory marine fish groups in the Late Cretaceous, achieving a worldwide distribution. They were an extremely diverse group, with some developing fusiform body plans whereas others evolved elongated body plans with long beaks, superficially similar to eels and needlefish. They could also grow to very large sizes, as seen with Cimolichthys and Stratodus, the latter of which is the largest aulopiform known. Their most famous member is the widespread, abundant, and long-lasting genus Enchodus.

Most enchodontoids went extinct at the end of the Cretaceous, although some dercetids survived into the Early Paleocene and Stratodus into the Early Eocene of the Trans-Saharan seaway. Some remains of Enchodus have also been recovered from the Paleocene and Eocene, although this may just represent reworked material.

== Taxonomy ==
Although initially classified among Stomiiformes and then the Salmoniformes in the mid-20th century, studies since the 1970s have found them to be deeply nested among the lizardfishes and lancetfishes in the order Aulopiformes. Some studies group them with the extant superorder Alepisauroidei, although a majority consider them their own distinct group. Their taxonomy is disputed, with some studies finding the group to be polyphyletic with its members scattered among the Aulopiformes, although most recent studies have recovered the group as monophyletic, based on the synapomorphy of maxilla included in the gape of the mouth. Other studies have classified the different superfamilies as their own individual suborders, though most now classify them as one suborder. The taxonomy within the group is even more disputed, with multiple families within the group recovered as paraphyletic in some studies.

=== Classification ===
The following taxonomy is partially based on Silva & Gallo (2011). Other studies have found differing classifications for the group.

- Suborder †Enchodontoidei
  - Genus †Atolvorator
  - Genus †Hemisaurida (possibly in the Halecidae)
  - Genus †Spinascutichthys
  - Genus †Stratodus (possibly in the Dercetidae)
  - Genus †Rharbichthys (possibly in the Enchodontidae)
  - Genus †Yabrudichthys
  - Family †Nardorexidae
  - Family †Aspidopleuridae (containing only Aspidopleurus)
  - Family ? †Serrilepidae (alternatively within the Halecidae)
  - Superfamily †Ichthyotringoidea
    - Genus †Ursichthys
    - Family †Ichthyotringidae
    - Family †Apateopholidae
  - Superfamily †Cimolichthyoidea
    - Family †Cimolichthyidae
    - Family †Dercetidae
    - Family †Prionolepididae
  - Superfamily †Enchodontoidea
    - Family †Enchodontidae
  - Superfamily †Halecoidea
    - Family †Halecidae

== Sources ==
- Chida, Mori (Fall 2022). A new species of dercetid and the assessment of the phylogeny of the Enchodontoidei (Teleostei: Aulopiformes) (Thesis). University of Alberta Library. doi:10.7939/r3-nqmz-nf15 (inactive 1 July 2025).
