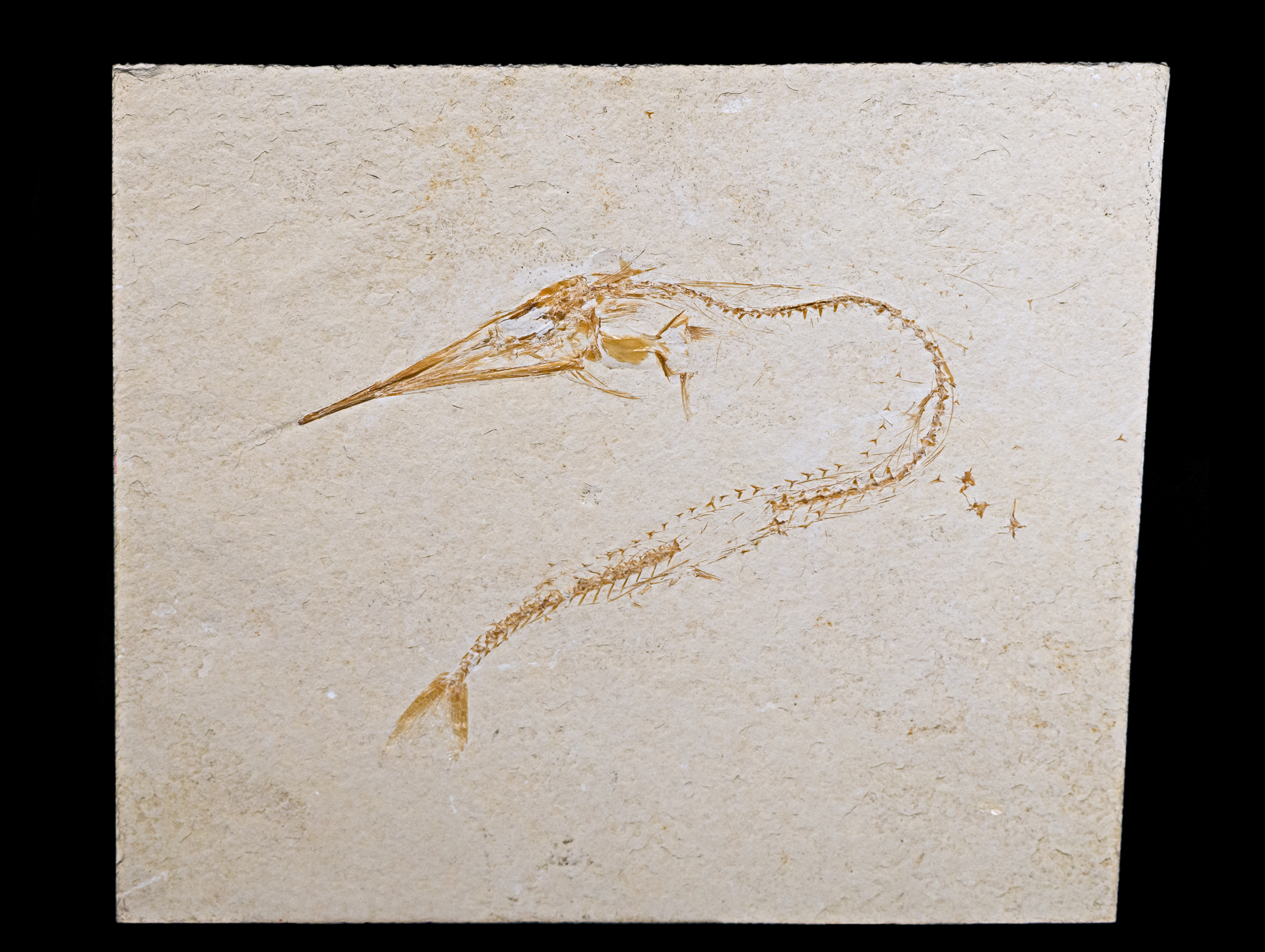
- Rhynchodercetis hakelensis

Scientific classification
- Domain: Eukaryota
- Kingdom: Animalia
- Phylum: Chordata
- Class: Actinopterygii
- Order: Alepisauriformes
- Genus: †Rhynchodercetis; Arambourg, 1943

= Rhynchodercetis =

Extinct genus of ray-finned fishes

Rhynchodercetis (meaning "beaked throat whale") is a genus of prehistoric ray-finned fishes.

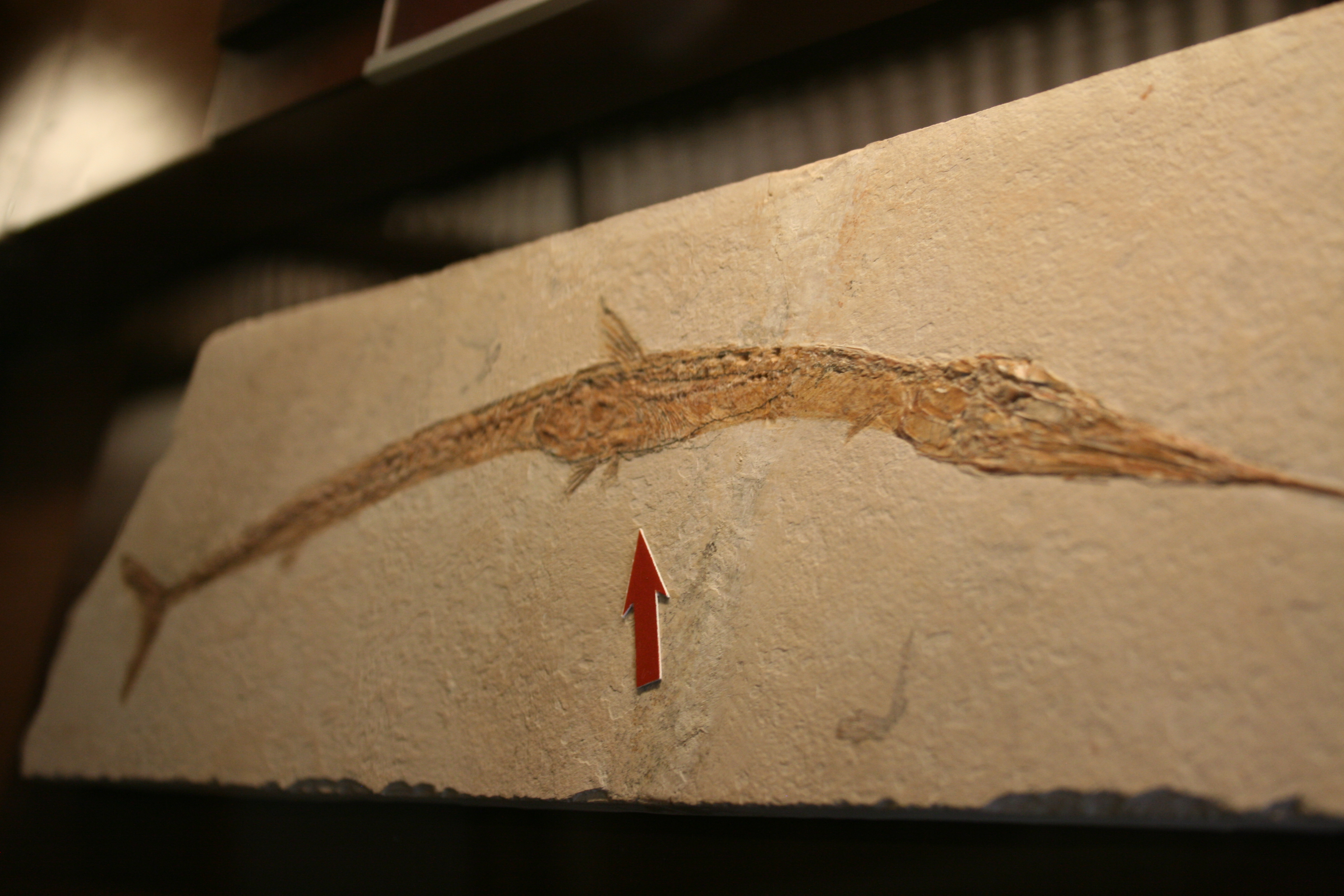
Rhynchodercetis with its prey from Lebanon in the Naturhistorisches Museum (Vienna)
