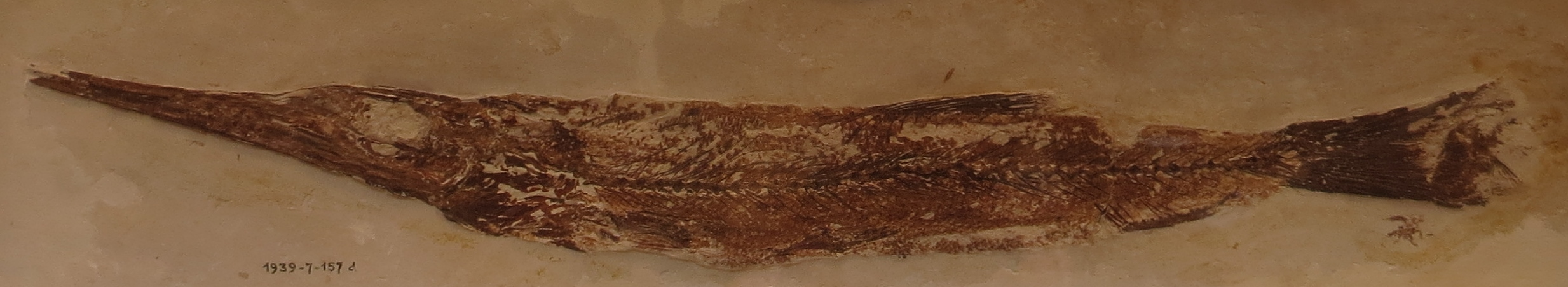
- Ichthyotringa ferox

Scientific classification
- Kingdom: Animalia
- Phylum: Chordata
- Class: Actinopterygii
- Order: Aulopiformes
- Superfamily: †Ichthyotringoidea
- Family: †Ichthyotringidae; Jordan, 1905

Genera
- †Apateodus; †Ichthyotringa

= Ichthyotringidae =

Ichthyotringidae Temporal range: Barremian–Maastrichtian

Extinct family of ray-finned fish

Ichthyotringidae is an extinct family of aulopiform ray-finned fish known from the Early to Late Cretaceous. It is one of the Enchodontoidei, a diverse group of aulopiforms that were dominant marine fish during the Cretaceous.

The following genera are known:

- Family †Ichthyotringidae
  - Genus †Apateodus
  - Genus †Ichthyotringa

The earliest records of ichthyotringids are indeterminate otoliths from the Barremian Kimigahama Formation of Japan.
