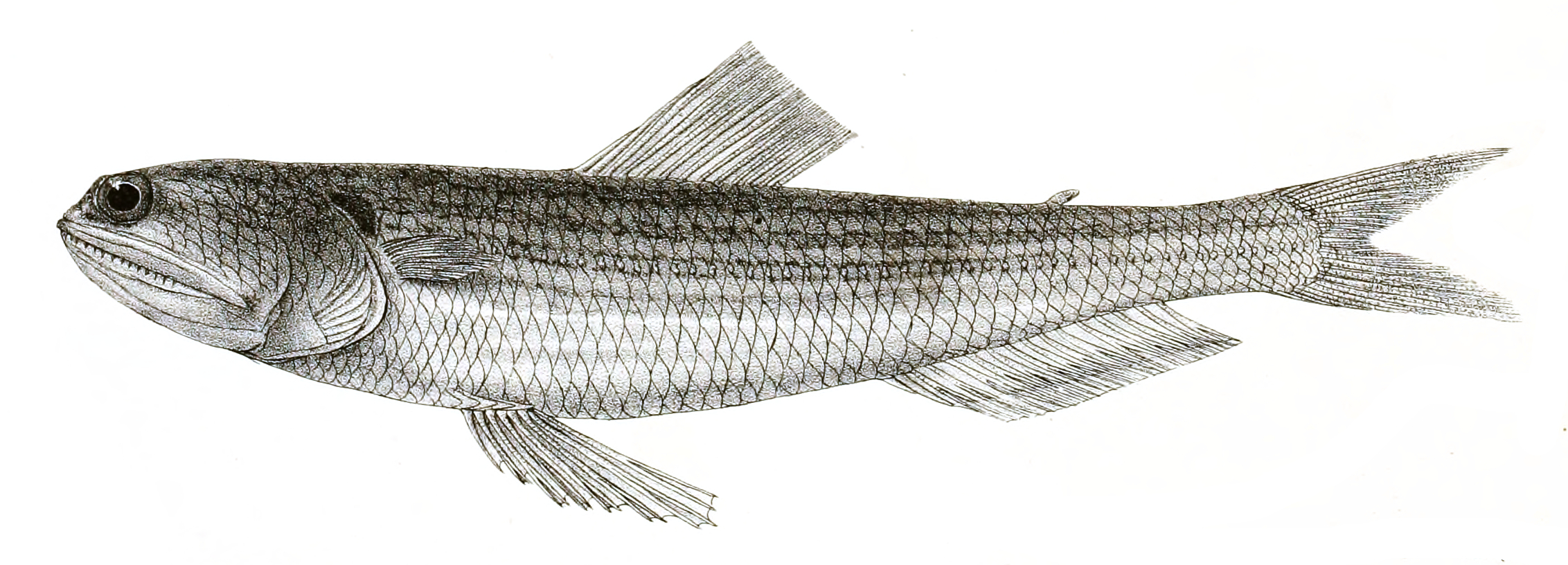
- Trachinocephalus myops

Scientific classification
- Kingdom: Animalia
- Phylum: Chordata
- Class: Actinopterygii
- Order: Aulopiformes
- Family: Synodontidae
- Subfamily: Synodontinae
- Genus: Trachinocephalus; T. N. Gill, 1861

= Trachinocephalus =

Genus of fishes

Trachinocephalus is a genus of fishes in the family Synodontidae found in Atlantic, Indian and Pacific Ocean.

== Species ==
There are currently 4 recognized species in this genus:

- Trachinocephalus atrisignis (Black-tipped lizardfish)
- Trachinocephalus gauguini Polanco F., Acero P & Betancur-R., 2016
- Trachinocephalus myops (J. R. Forster, 1801) (blunt-nose lizardfish)
- Trachinocephalus trachinus (Temminck & Schlegel, 1846)
