= Pelargorhynchus =

Scientific classification
- Domain: Eukaryota
- Kingdom: Animalia
- Phylum: Chordata
- Class: Actinopterygii
- Order: Alepisauriformes
- Genus: †Pelargorhynchus von der Marck, 1858

Extinct genus of ray-finned fishes

Pelargorhynchus (meaning "stork beak") is a genus of prehistoric ray-finned fishes.
