= Phylactocephalus =

Scientific classification
- Kingdom: Animalia
- Phylum: Chordata
- Class: Actinopterygii
- Order: Alepisauriformes
- Genus: †Phylactocephalus; Davis, 1887

Extinct genus of ray-finned fishes

Phylactocephalus is a genus of prehistoric ray-finned fishes.
