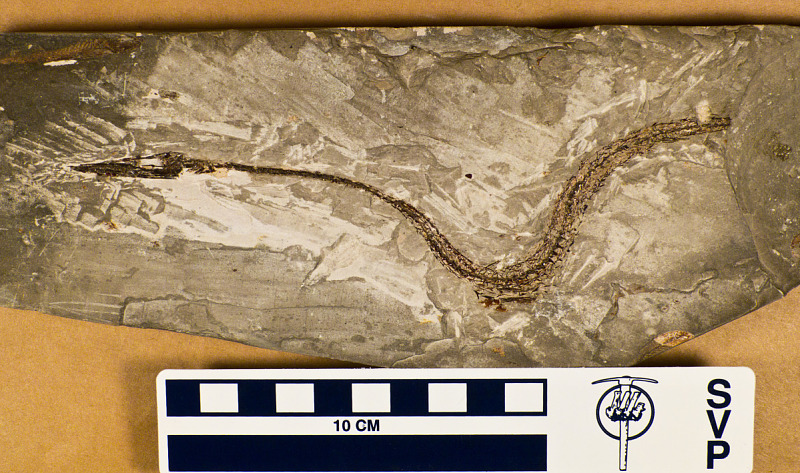
- Dercetis sp. from Lebanon

Scientific classification
- Kingdom: Animalia
- Phylum: Chordata
- Class: Actinopterygii
- Order: Aulopiformes
- Family: †Dercetidae
- Genus: †Dercetis; Agassiz, 1834

Type species
- †Dercetis elongatus Agassiz, 1835

Species
- †D. elongatus Agassiz, 1835; †D. magnificus Chida, Brinkman & Murray, 2022; †D. triqueter Pictet, 1850

= Dercetis (fish) =

Dercetis Temporal range: Turonian to Maastrichtian

Extinct genus of ray-finned fishes

Dercetis is a genus of prehistoric marine ray-finned fish. It is the type genus of the family Dercetidae, a group of slender, elongate aulopiforms, which were related to modern lizardfish and grinners. It is known from the Late Cretaceous of Europe, the Middle East, and western North America.

The following species are known:

- †D. elongatus Agassiz, 1835 - Turonian of England (English Chalk), Campanian of Germany (Ahlen Formation) (=Leptotrachelus sagittatus von der Marck, 1873)
- †D. magnificus Chida, Brinkman & Murray, 2022 - Campanian of Alberta, Canada (Bearpaw Formation and potentially Dinosaur Park Formation)
- †D. triqueter Pictet, 1850 - Santonian of Lebanon (Sahel Alma), Maastrichtian of the Netherlands & Belgium (Maastricht Formation)

Small Dercetis specimens corresponding to indeterminate species are known from the Turonian of the Czech Republic and Mexico.

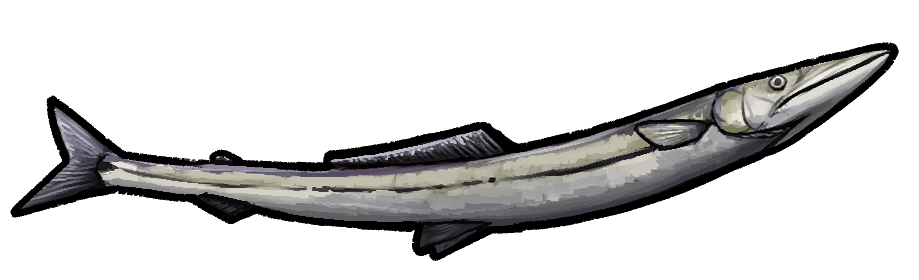
Life restoration of D. triqueter

The initial type species, D. scutatus Agassiz, 1834 from the Campanian of Germany (Baumberge Formation), is known from a now-lost specimen and is thus considered a nomen nudum. D. elongatus, which is now treated as the type species of the genus, was initially classified into Dercetis, then reclassified into the now-defunct genus Leptotrachelus before being reclassified back into Dercetis. The same treatment occurred for D. triqueter. Many other dercetid taxa were initially classified into Dercetis before being moved to their own genera. Other indeterminate taxa dubiously classified into Dercetis, but with no reclassification yet, include D. reussi Fristch, 1878 from the Czech Republic and D. latiscutatus Woodward, 1903 & D. maximus Woodward, 1903 from England.

As suggested by its name, D. magnificus is the largest species of the genus, and possibly one of the largest dercetids, with the potential to grow to one meter in length. It inhabited open marine environments of the northern Western Interior Seaway.
