= List of the Mesozoic life of Delaware =

This list of the Mesozoic life of Delaware contains the various prehistoric life-forms whose fossilized remains have been reported from within the US state of Delaware and are between 252.17 and 66 million years of age.

== A ==
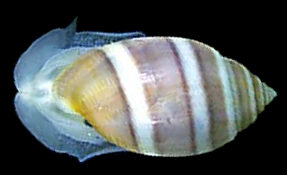
- A living Acteon barrel bubble sea snail
  †Acteon
  - †Acteon cretacea
- †Acutostrea
  - †Acutostrea plumosa
- †Aenona – tentative report
  - †Aenona eufaulensis
- †Agerostrea
  - †Agerostrea mesenterica
- †Amaurellina
  - †Amaurellina stephensoni
- †Ambigostrea
  - †Ambigostrea tecticosta
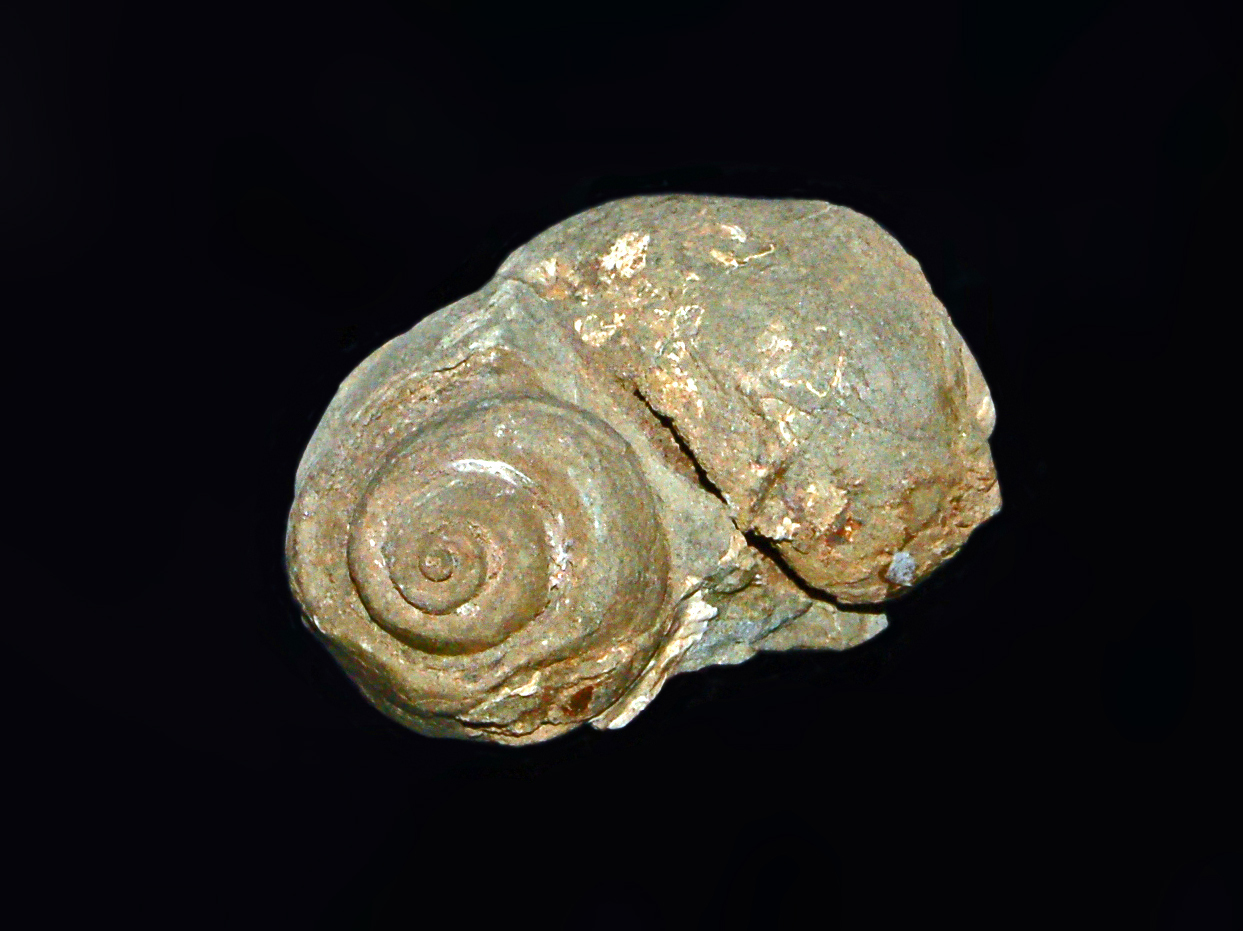
- Fossilized shell of the Jurassic-Miocene sea snail Ampullina
  †Ampullina
  - †Ampullina lepta
  - †Ampullina lirata
  - †Ampullina meekana
- †Anaklinoceras
  - †Anaklinoceras reflexum
  - †Anaklinoceras tenuicostatum
- †Anchura – tentative report
- †Anisomyon – tentative report
  - †Anisomyon borealis
  - †Anisomyon jessupi
- †Anomalofusus
  - †Anomalofusus substriatus – tentative report
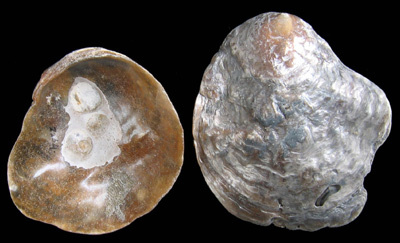
- Interior and exterior of a shell of an Anomia, or jingle shell
  †Anomia
  - †Anomia argentaria
  - †Anomia radiata
  - †Anomia tellinoides
- †Anomoeodus
  - †Anomoeodus phaseolus
- †Aphrodina
  - †Aphrodina eufaulensis
  - †Aphrodina tippana
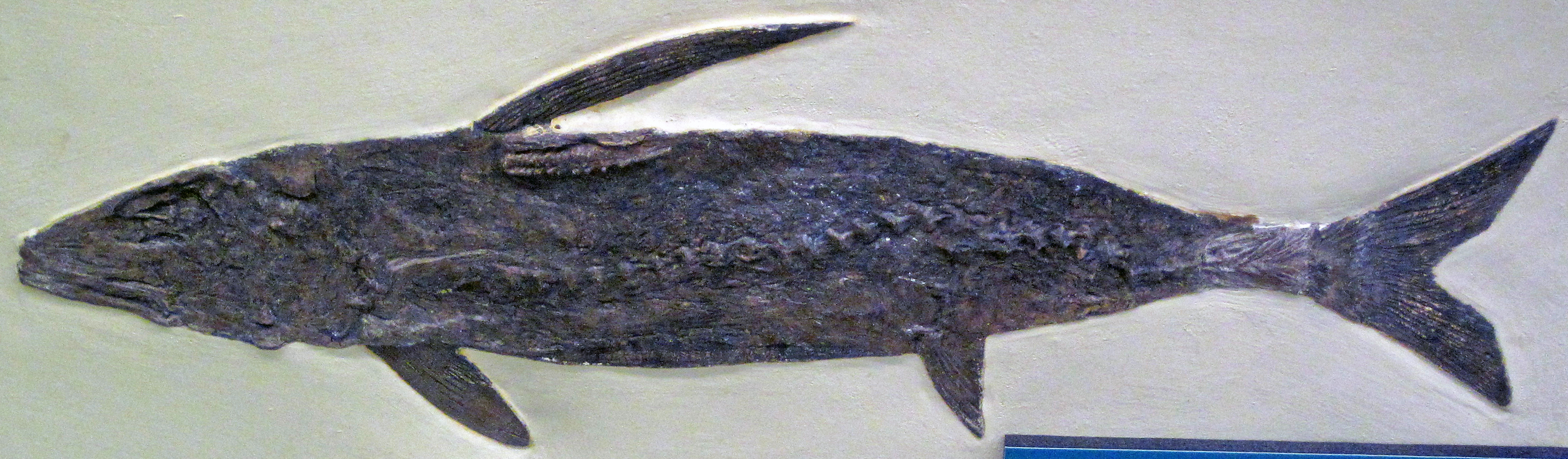
- Fossilized skeleton of the Late Cretaceous bony fish Apsopelix
  †Apsopelix
  - †Apsopelix anglicus
- †Araloselachus
  - †Araloselachus cuspidata
- †Arca
  - †Arca macnairyensis
- Architectonica – or unidentified comparable form
  - †Architectonica voragiformis
- Arrhoges
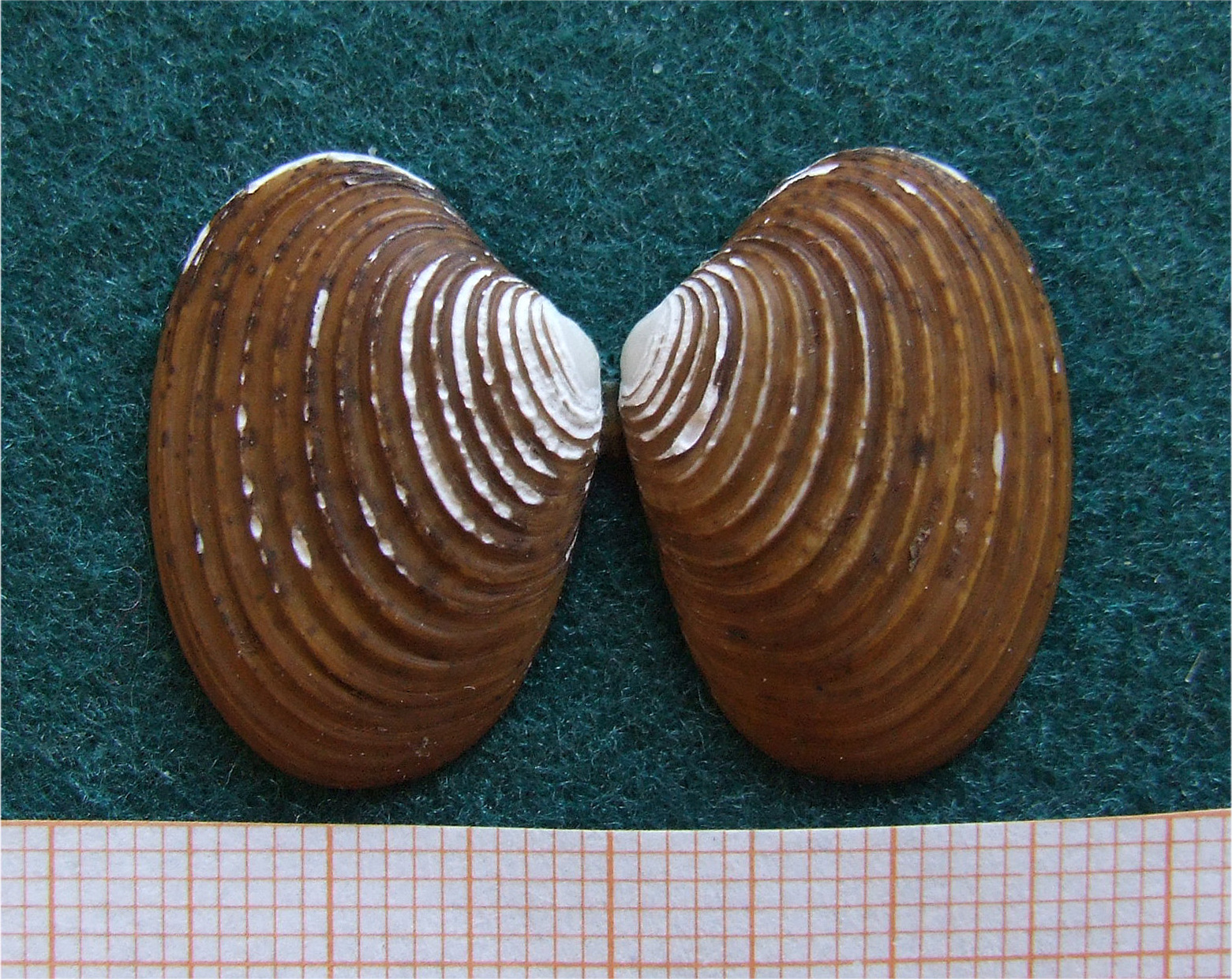
- Shell of a modern Astarte bivalve
  Astarte – tentative report
- †Avellana
  - †Avellana bullata

== B ==
- †Baculites
  - †Baculites haresi
  - †Baculites minerensis
  - †Baculites ovatus
  - †Baculites undatus
- Barbatia
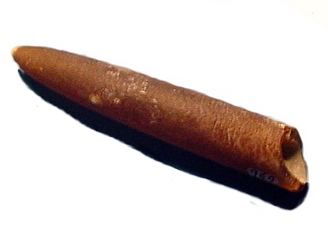
- Fossilized guard of the Late Cretaceous belemnoid cephalopod Belemnitella
  †Belemnitella
  - †Belemnitella americana
- †Bellifusus
  - †Bellifusus curvicostatus
- †Belliscala – or unidentified comparable form
  - †Belliscala creideri
- †Beretra
- Bernaya
  - †Bernaya burlingtonensis
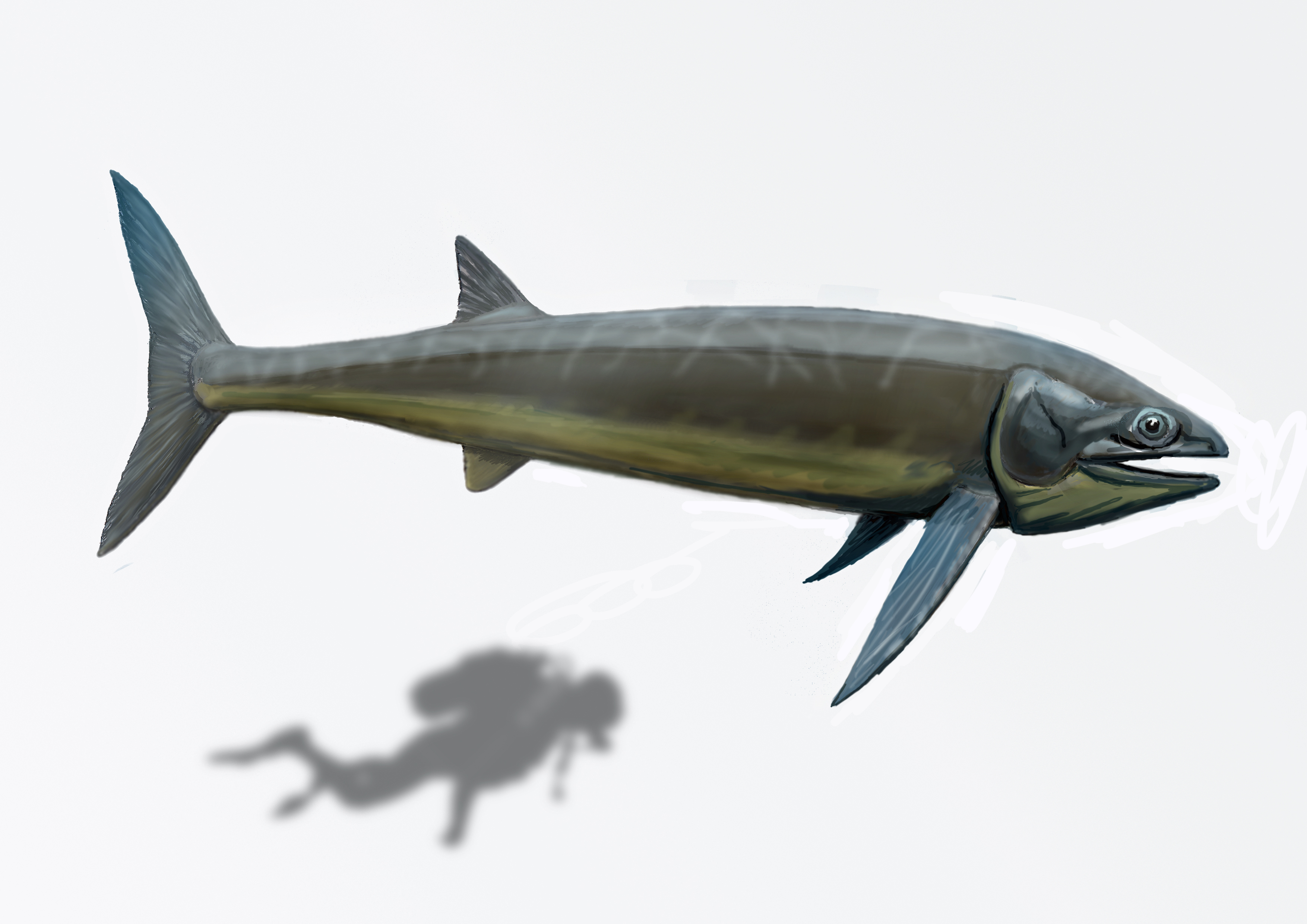
- Life restoration of the Late Cretaceous bony fish Bonnerichthys with an anachronistic scuba diver to scale
  †Bonnerichthys
  - †Bonnerichthys gladius
- †Brachyrhizodus
  - †Brachyrhizodus wichitaensis
- †Breviarca
  - †Breviarca haddonfieldensis
  - †Breviarca richardsi – tentative report
- †Buccinopsis
- †Bulla
  - †Bulla macrostromata

== C ==
- Cadulus
  - †Cadulus obnutus
- Caestocorbula
  - †Caestocorbula crassiplica
- †Calliomphalus
  - †Calliomphalus americanus – tentative report
  - †Calliomphalus nudus
  - †Calliomphalus paucispirilus
- †Camptonectes
  - †Camptonectes bellisculptus
  - †Camptonectes burlingtonensis
- †Cantharulus – tentative report
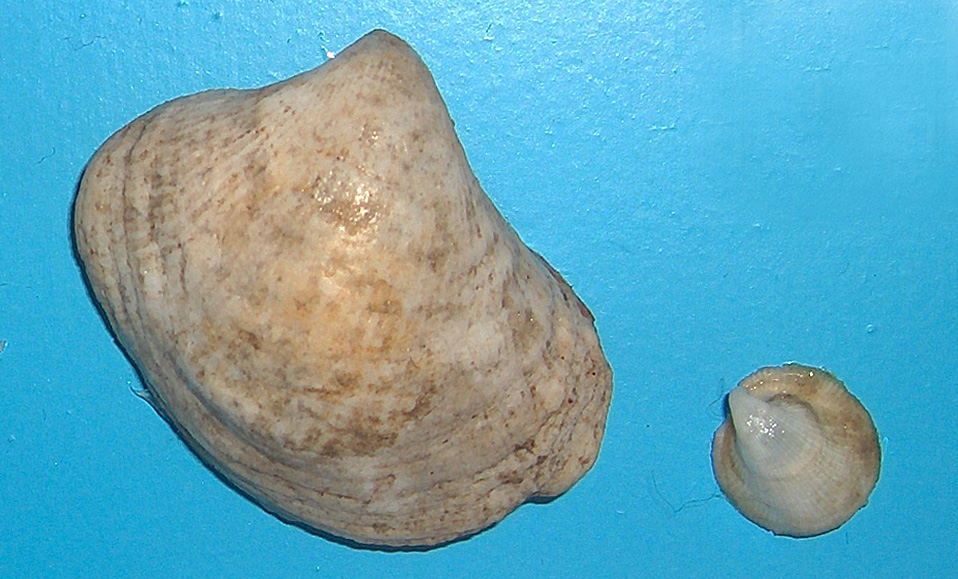
- Shells of modern Capulus cap sea snails
  Capulus
- Cardium
  - †Cardium spillmani
- Caryocorbula
- †Caveola
- †Cenomanocarcinus
  - †Cenomanocarcinus robertsi
- Cerithium
  - †Cerithium weeksi
- †Chesapeakiceras
  - †Chesapeakiceras nodatum – type locality for species
- Clavagella
  - †Clavagella armata
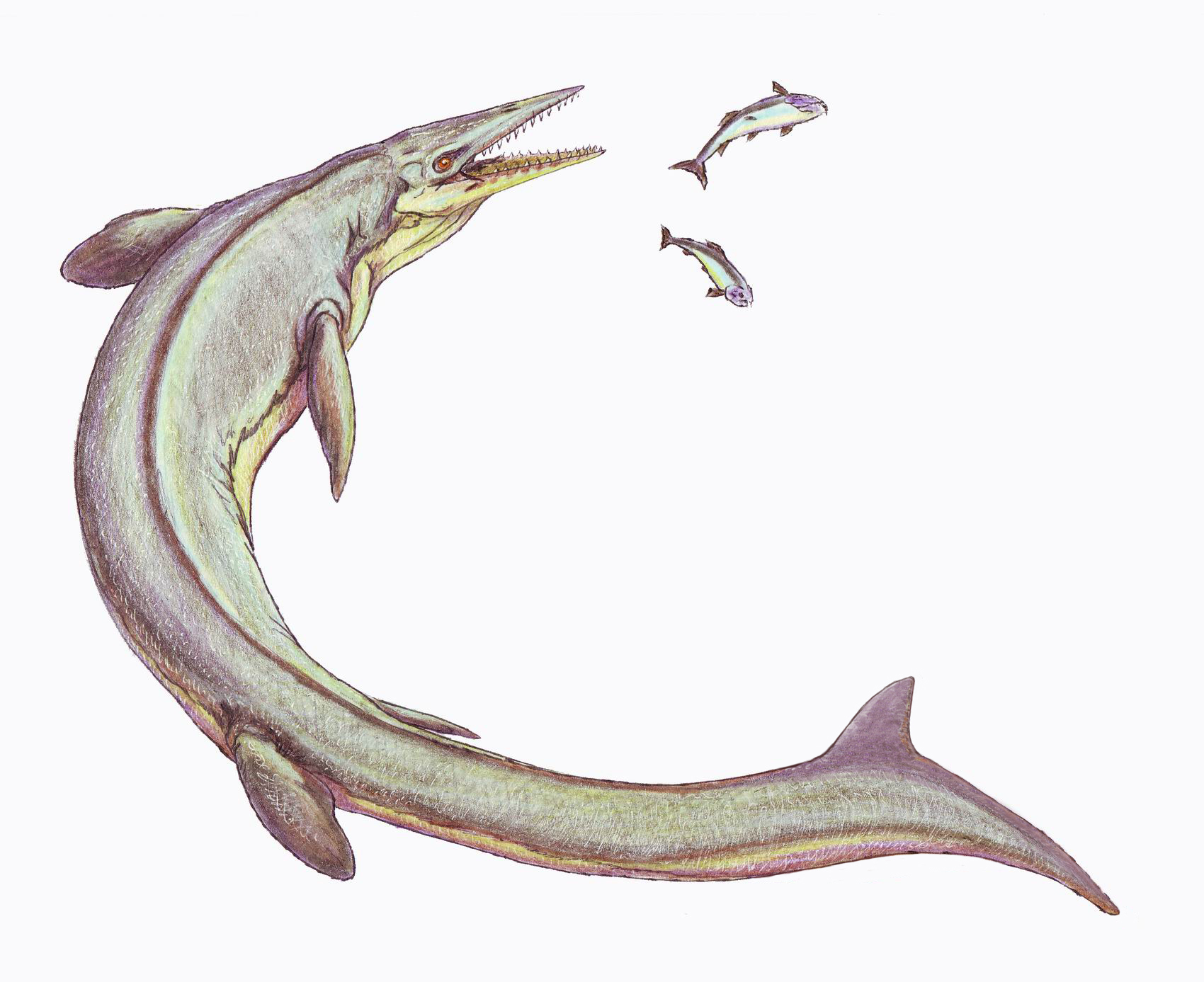
- Life restoration of the Late Cretaceous mosasaurid Clidastes
  †Clidastes – or unidentified comparable form
- Cliona
- †Clisocolus
- †Coelosaurus
  - †Coelosaurus antiquus
- Corbula
- Crassatella
  - †Crassatella newkirkensis
  - †Crassatella vadosa
- †Crenella
  - †Crenella serica
- †Cretodus
  - †Cretodus borodini
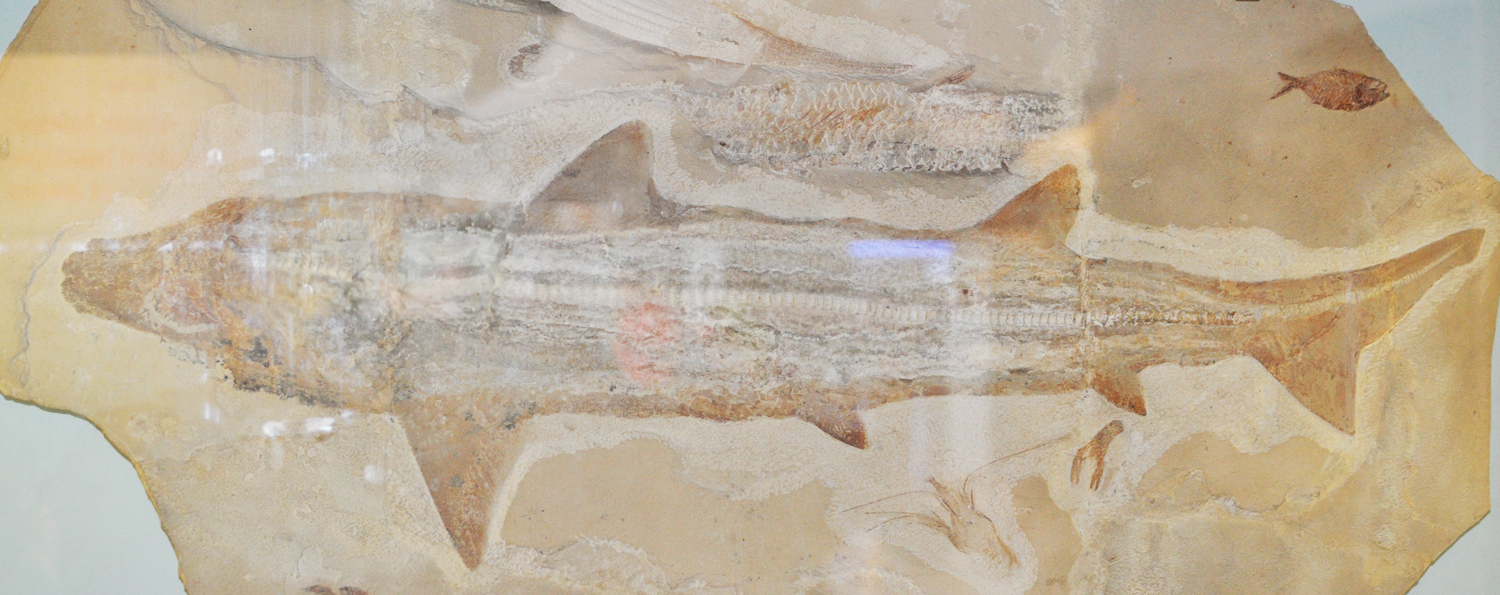
- Fossil of the Early Cretaceous-Eocene shark Cretolamna
  †Cretolamna
  - †Cretolamna appendiculata
- †Cryptotexanites
  - †Cryptotexanites paedomorphicus – type locality for species
- Cucullaea
  - †Cucullaea tippana
  - †Cucullaea vulgaris
- Cuspidaria
  - †Cuspidaria grandis
- Cylichna
  - †Cylichna secalina
- †Cylindrocanthus – or unidentified comparable form
- †Cymbophora
  - †Cymbophora subtilis
- †Cymella
  - †Cymella bella
  - †Cymella ironensis
- †Cyprimeria
  - †Cyprimeria excavata

== D ==
- †Dentalium
  - †Dentalium intercalatum
  - †Dentalium subarctuatum
- †Dhondtichlamys – tentative report
  - †Dhondtichlamys venustus
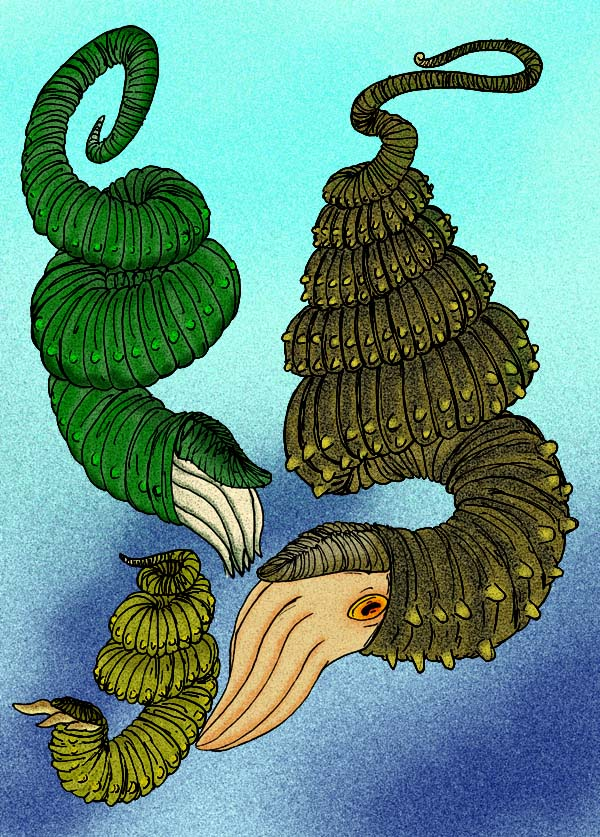
- Restoration of several species of the Late Cretaceous ammonoid cephalopod Didymoceras
  †Didymoceras
  - †Didymoceras binodosum
  - †Didymoceras cheyennense
  - †Didymoceras draconis
  - †Didymoceras platycostatum
  - †Didymoceras stevensoni
- †Distefania
  - †Distefania lauginigeri
- †Drepanochilus
- †Dryptosaurus

== E ==
- †Ecphora – tentative report
- †Ellipsoscapha
- Emarginula
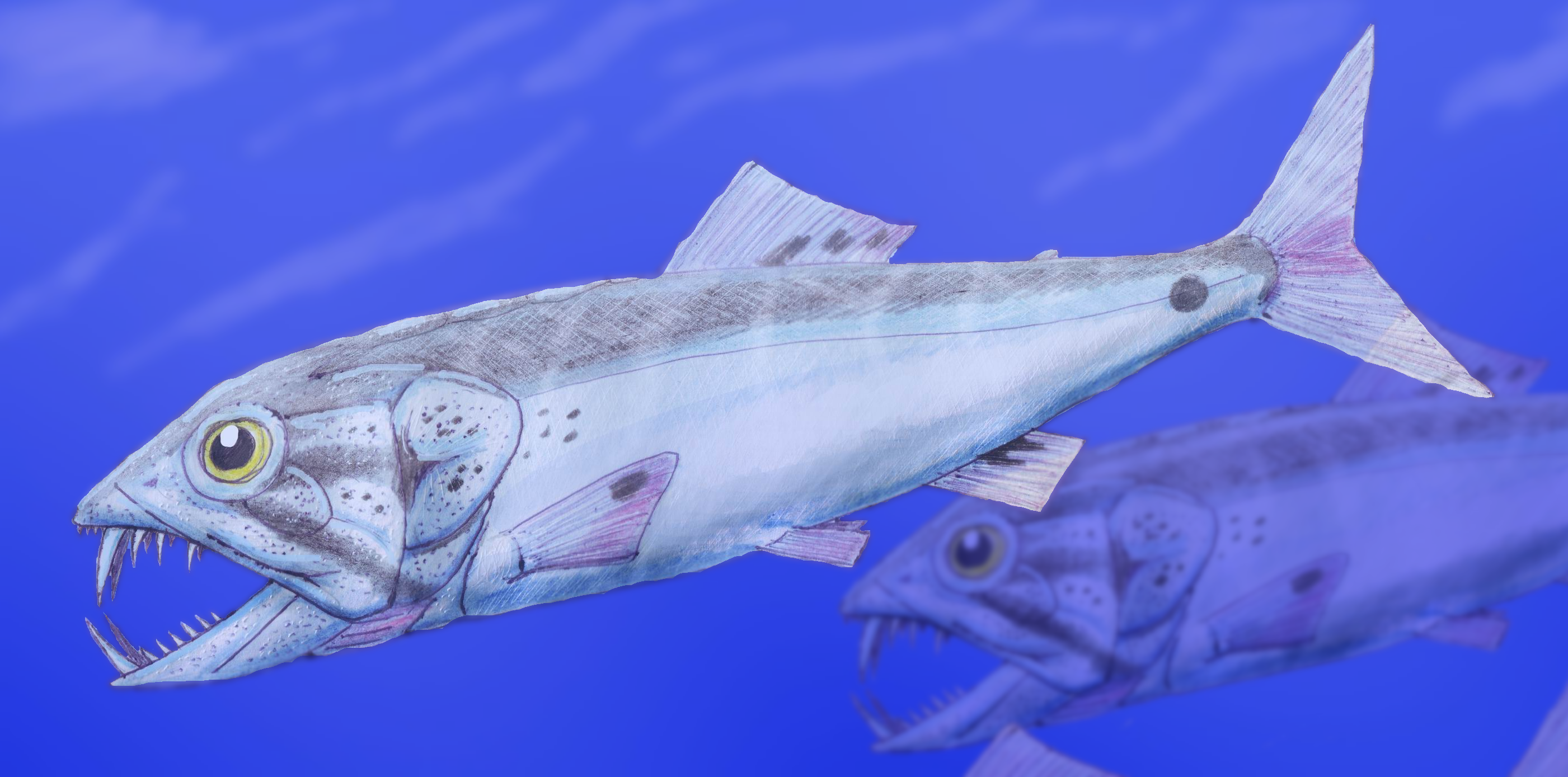
- Restoration of the Early Cretaceous-Eocene bony fish Enchodus, or the "saber-toothed herring"
  †Enchodus
  - †Enchodus ferox
- †Endoptygma – or unidentified comparable form
  - †Endoptygma leprosa
- †Eoacteon
  - †Eoacteon percultus
- †Etea
  - †Etea carolinensis
- †Eufistulana
- †Eulophoceras – tentative report
- †Euspira
  - †Euspira rectilabrum
- †Eutrephoceras
  - †Eutrephoceras dekayi
- †Exiteloceras
  - †Exiteloceras jenneyi
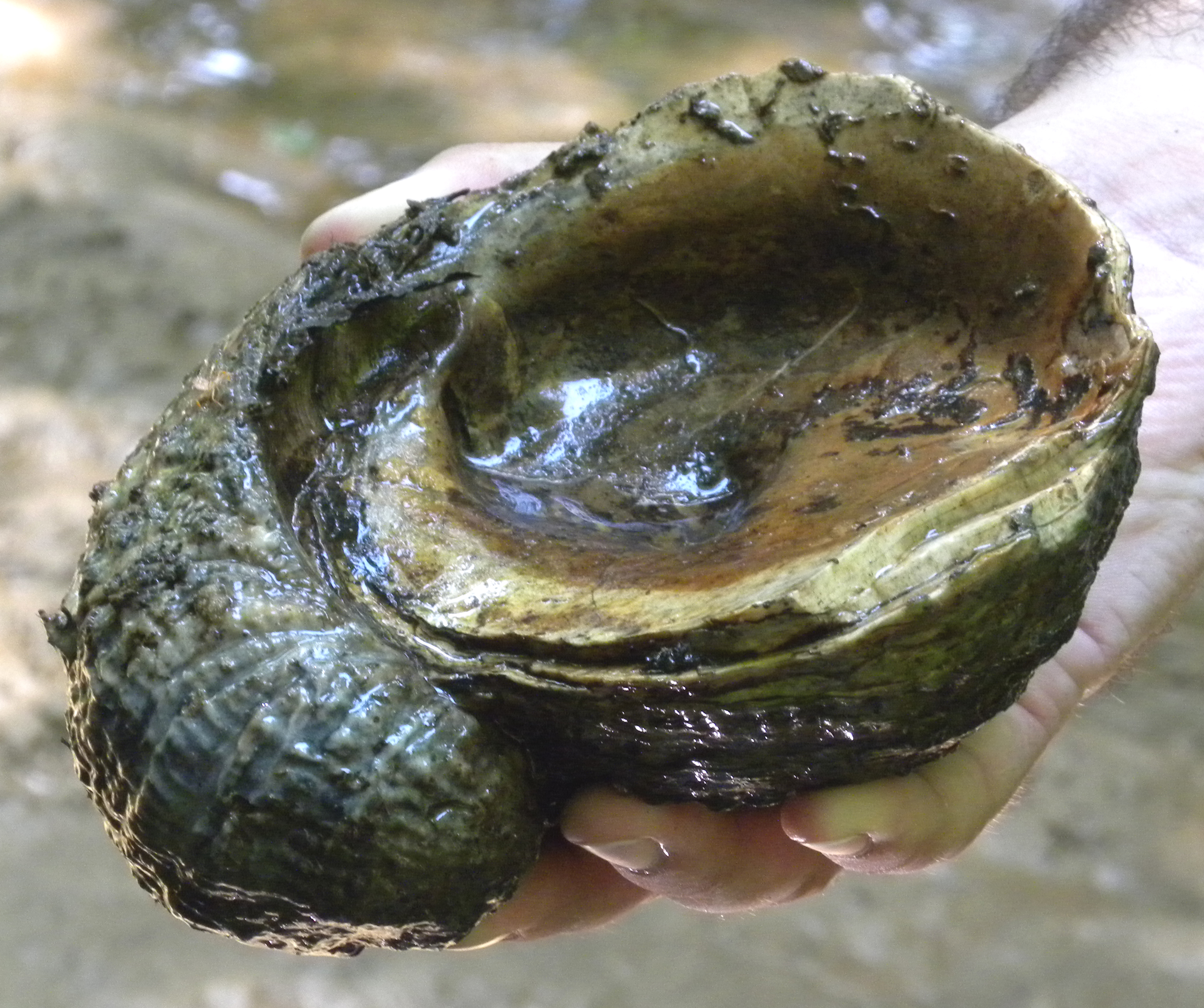
- Interior of a fossilized shell of the Jurassic-Cretaceous foam oyster Exogyra
  †Exogyra
  - †Exogyra cancellata
  - †Exogyra costata
  - †Exogyra ponderosa
  - †Exogyra ponderosa erraticostata

== G ==
- Gastrochaena
- †Gegania
  - †Gegania bella
- †Gervilliopsis
- Ginglymostoma
  - †Ginglymostoma globidens
- †Ginglyostoma
  - †Ginglyostoma globidens
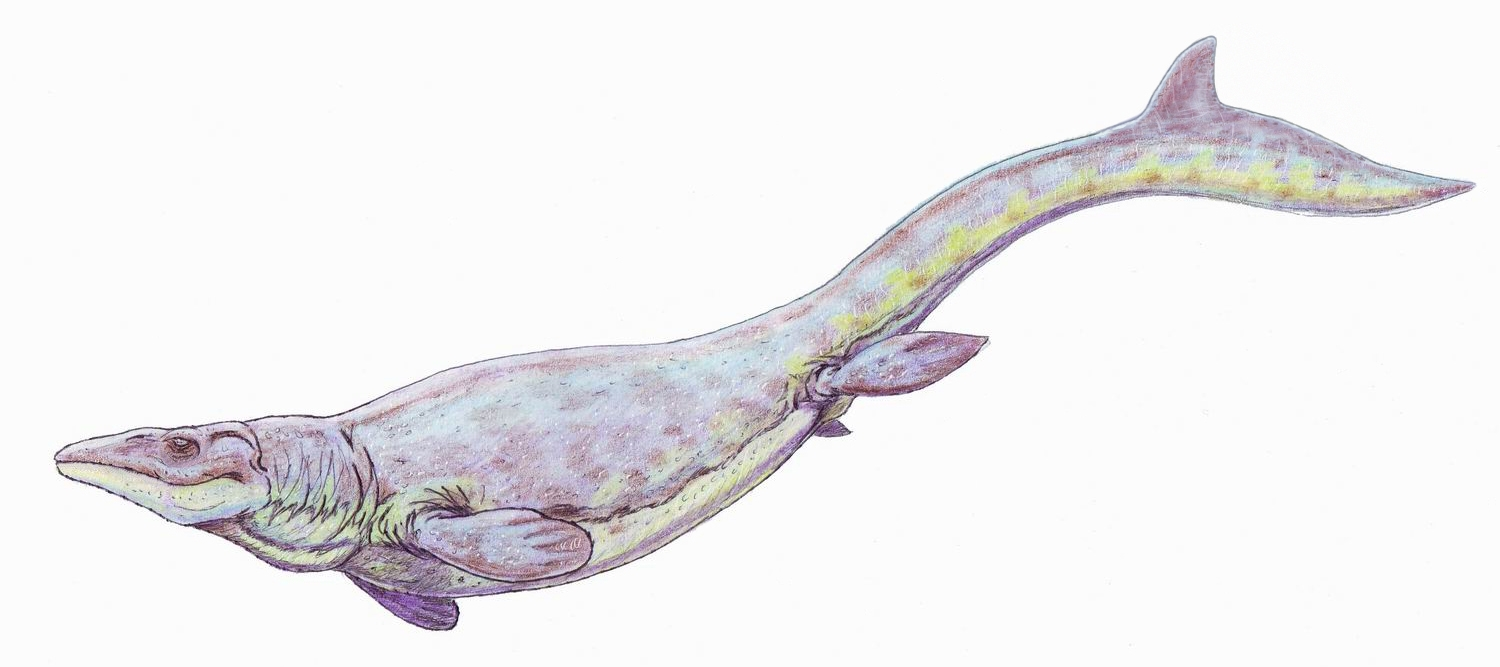
- Life restoration of the Late Cretaceous mosasaur Globidens
  †Globidens
  - †Globidens alabamensis
- Glossus
- Glycymeris
  - †Glycymeris mortoni
- †Graciliala
  - †Graciliala johnsoni
- †Granocardium
  - †Granocardium dumosum
  - †Granocardium kummeli
  - †Granocardium tenuistriatum
- †Gryphaeostrea
  - †Gryphaeostrea vomer
- Gyrodes
  - †Gyrodes abyssinus
  - †Gyrodes americanus – tentative report
  - †Gyrodes supraplicatus
  - †Gyrodes vetrosus

== H ==
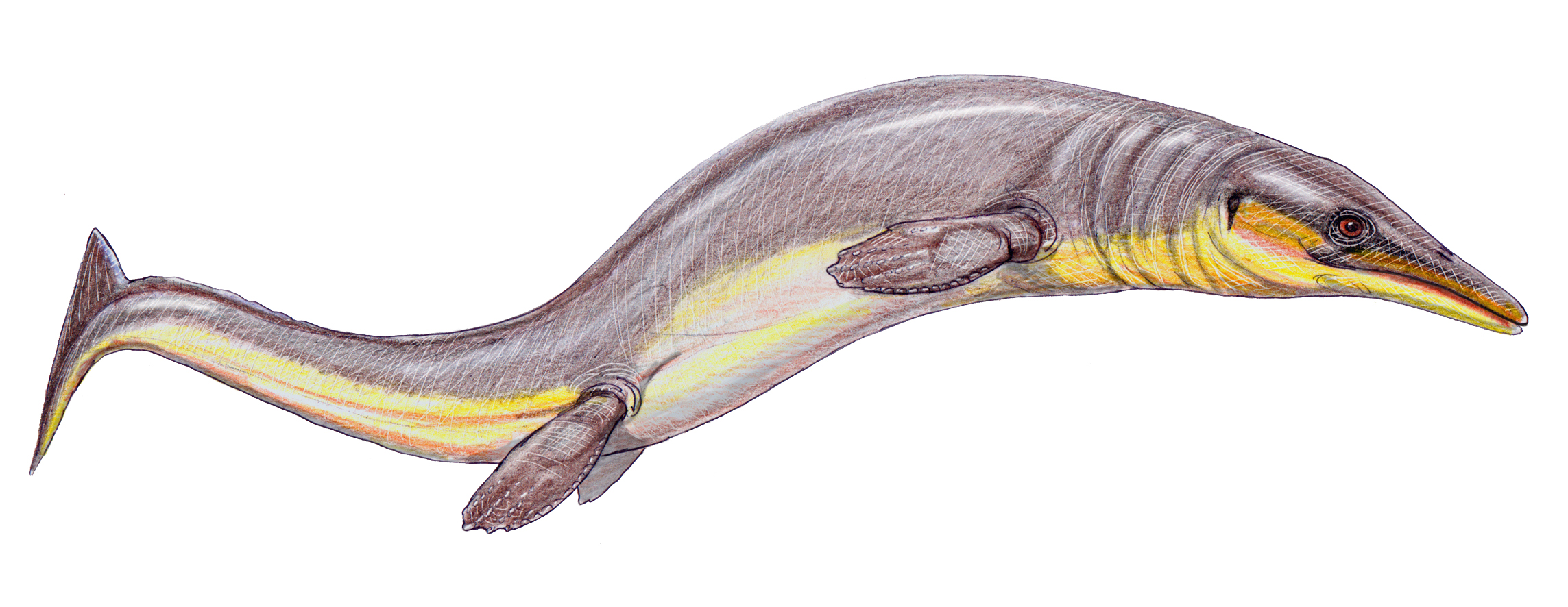
- Life restoration of the Late Cretaceous mosasaur Halisaurus
  †Halisaurus
  - †Halisaurus platyspondylus
- †Hamulus
  - †Hamulus major
  - †Hamulus onyx
- †Harduinia
  - †Harduinia florealis
- Haustator – or unidentified comparable form
  - †Haustator lenolensis
- Hemiaster
  - †Hemiaster delawarensis
  - †Hemiaster ungula
- †Hercorhyncus
- †Hoploscaphites
  - †Hoploscaphites vistulensis
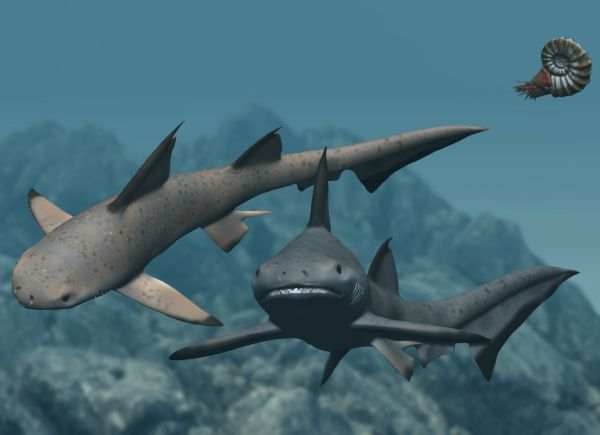
- Restoration of two of the Permian-Late Cretaceous cartilaginous fish Hybodus
  †Hybodus
- †Hypotodus
  - †Hypotodus aculeatus

== I ==
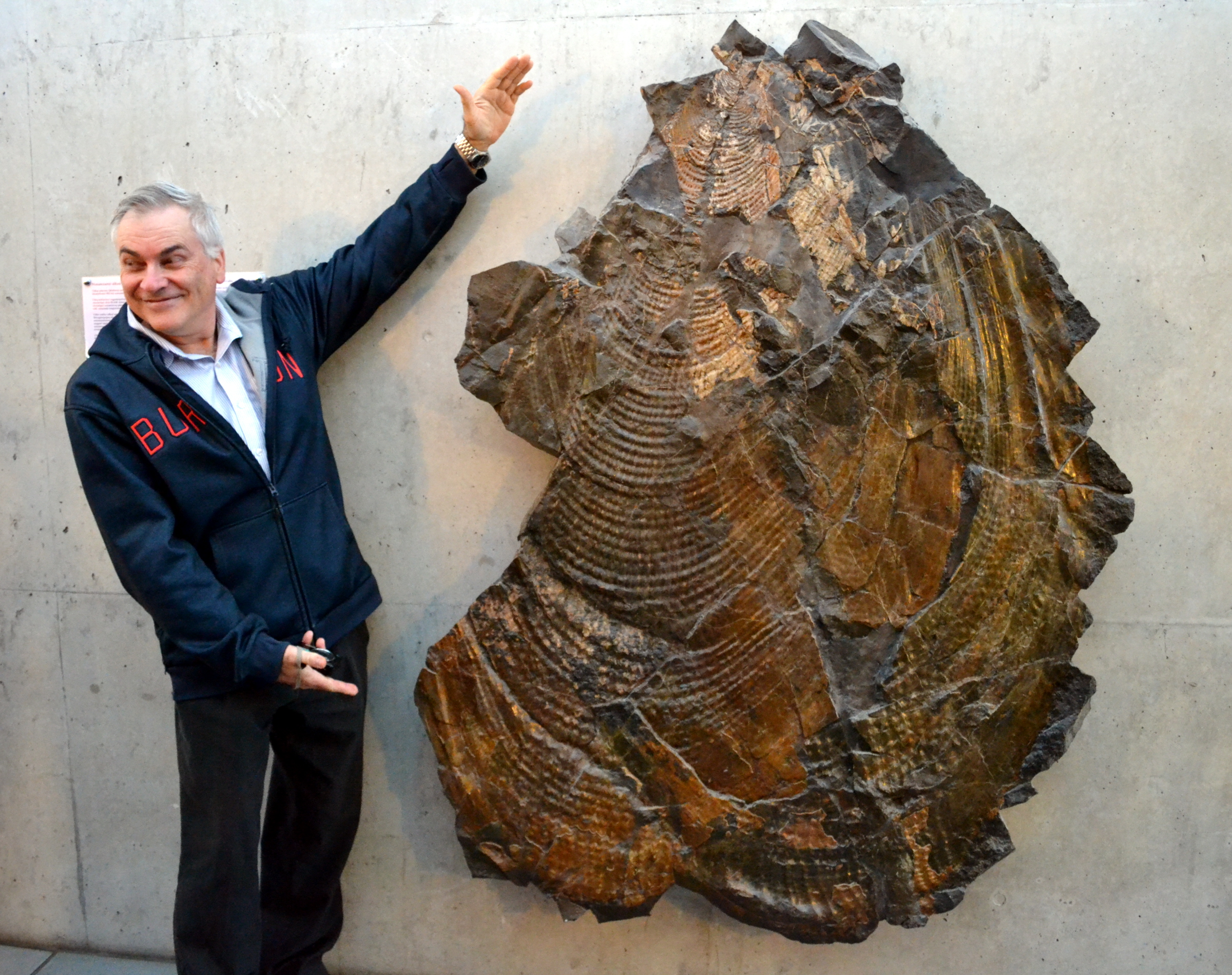
- Fossilized shell of the Early Jurassic-Late Cretaceous marine bivalve Inoceramus with a human indicating its size
  †Inoceramus
- †Ischyodus
  - †Ischyodus bifurcatus
- †Ischyrhiza
  - †Ischyrhiza avonicola – or unidentified comparable form
  - †Ischyrhiza mira

== J ==
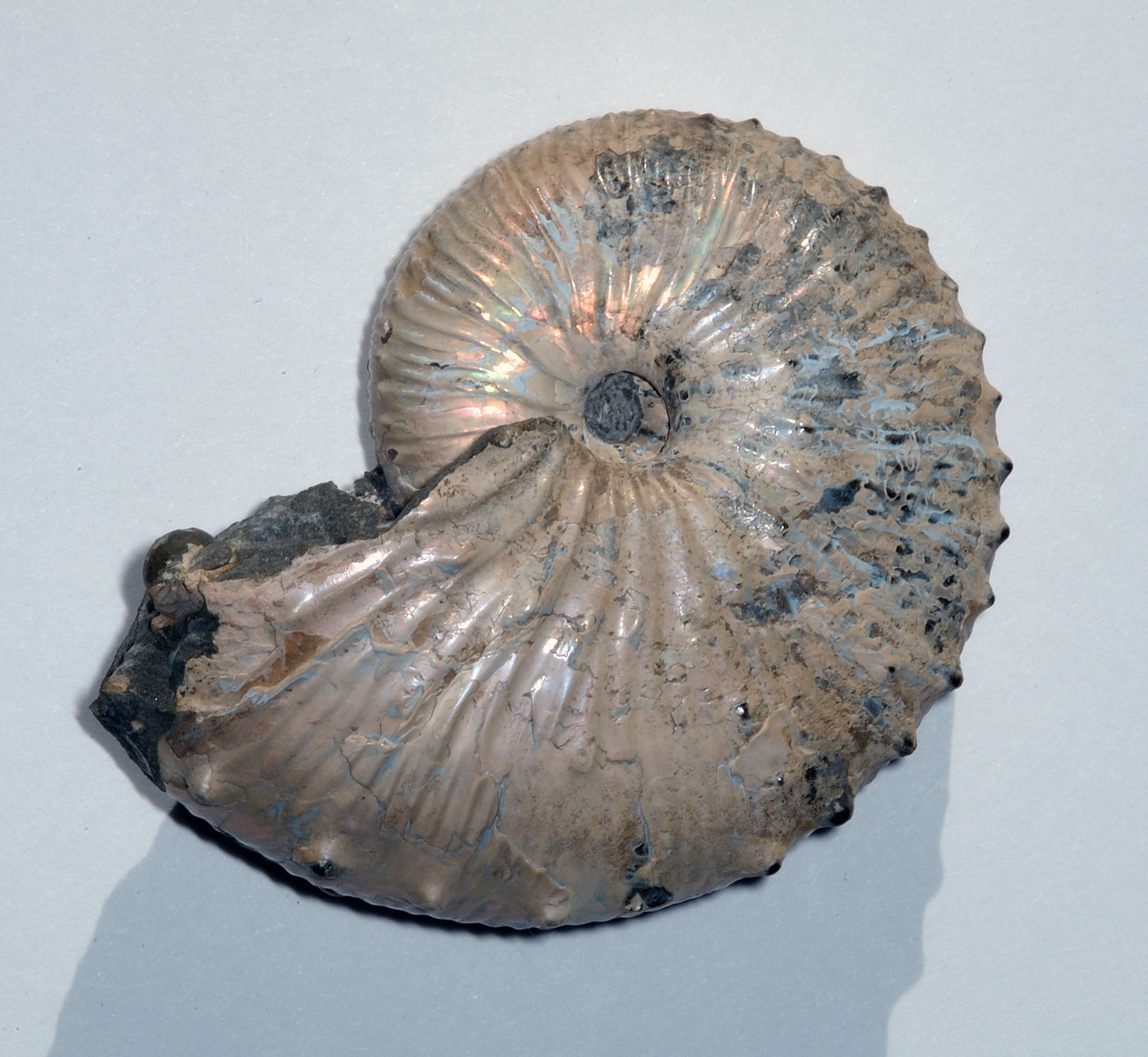
- Fossilized shell of the Late Cretaceous ammonoid cephalopod Jeletzkytes
  †Jeletzkytes
  - †Jeletzkytes compressus
- Juliacorbula – or unidentified comparable form
  - †Juliacorbula swedesboroensis

== L ==
- †Latiala – or unidentified comparable form
  - †Latiala lobata
- †Laxispira
  - †Laxispira lumbricalis
  - †Laxispira monilifera
- †Legumen
  - †Legumen concentricum
  - †Legumen ellipticum – tentative report
  - †Legumen planulatum
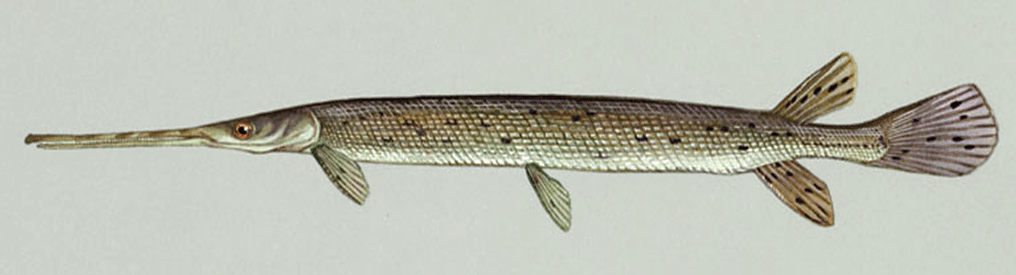
- Illustration of a living Lepisosteus, or gar
  Lepisosteus – or unidentified comparable form
- †Leptosolen
  - †Leptosolen biplicata
- Lima
  - †Lima lorillardensis
- †Linearis
  - †Linearis contracta
  - †Linearis magnoliensis
  - †Linearis metastriata
- †Lingula – tentative report
- †Liopistha
  - †Liopistha alternata – tentative report
  - †Liopistha protexta
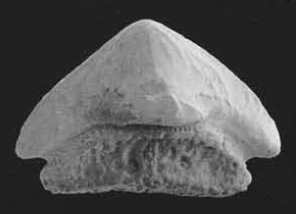
- Electron micrograph of fossilized teeth from the Early Jurassic-Early Cretaceous freshwater shark Lissodus
  †Lissodus
  - †Lissodus babulskii
- Lithophaga
  - †Lithophaga julia
- †Longoconcha
- Lopha
  - †Lopha falcata
- †Lucina
- †Lyriochlamys – or unidentified comparable form
- Malletia
  - †Malletia longifrons
  - †Malletia protexta – tentative report
  - †Malletia stephensoni
- †Margaritella
- Martesia
- †Mathilda
- †Menabites
  - †Menabites delawarensis
  - †Menabites vanuxemi
- †Menuites
  - †Menuites portlocki
- †Micrabacia
  - †Micrabacia marylandica
- †Morea – or unidentified comparable form
  - †Morea marylandica

== N ==
- †Napulus
  - †Napulus reesidei
- †Neithea
  - †Neithea quinquecostata
- †Nemocardium
  - †Nemocardium parahillanum
- †Nemodon
  - †Nemodon eufaulensis
- †Nonactaeonina
- †Notoceras
  - †Notoceras monotuberculatum
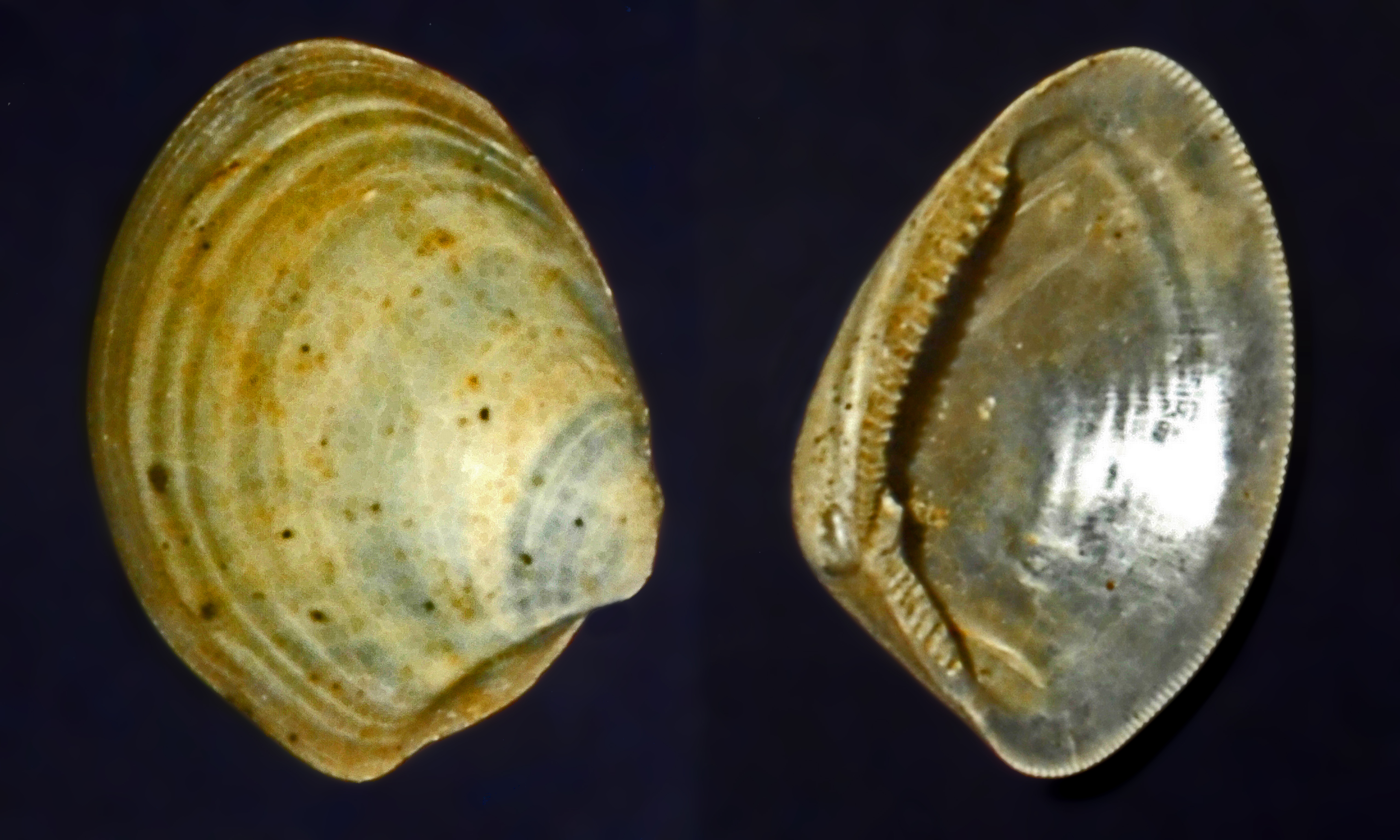
- Interior of a fossilized shell of the Early Ordovician-modern marine bivalve Nucula
  Nucula
  - †Nucula percrassa
  - †Nucula whitfieldi – tentative report
- Nuculana
  - †Nuculana compressifrons
  - †Nuculana marlboroensis
- †Nuculano
  - †Nuculano stephensani
- †Nudivagus
- †Nymphalucina
  - †Nymphalucina parva

== O ==
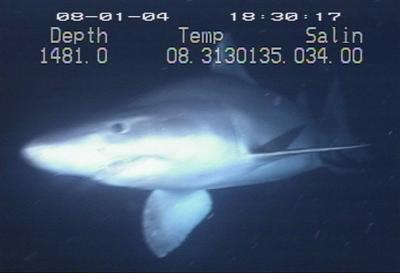
- A living Odontaspis sand shark
  Odontaspis
  - †Odontaspis macrota
  - †Odontaspis sahammeri
  - †Odontaspis samhammeri
- †Ornithomimus
  - †Ornithomimus antique
- †Ornopsis – or unidentified comparable form
  - †Ornopsis digressa
- Ostrea

== P ==
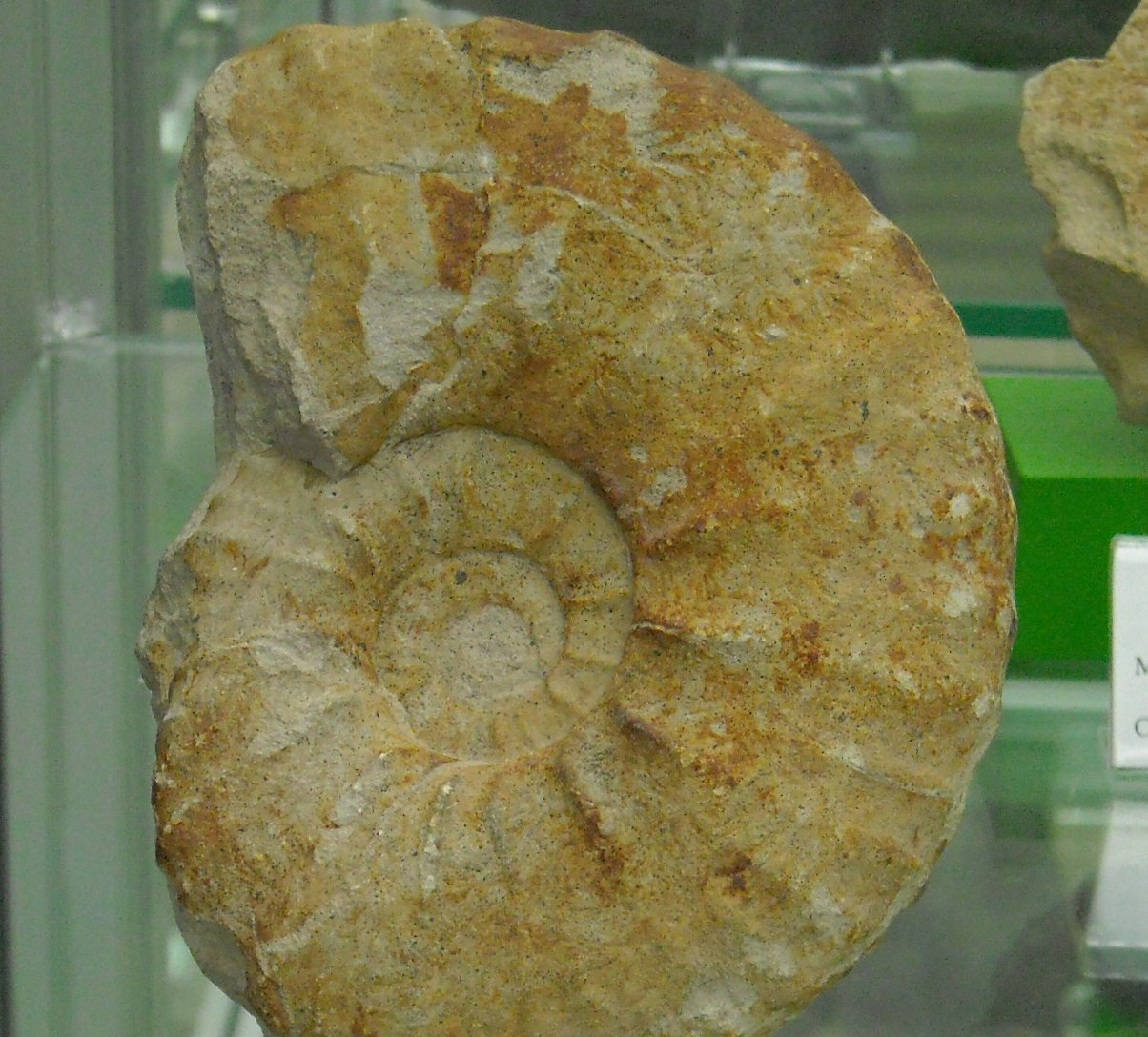
- Fossilized shell of the Late Cretaceous ammonoid cephalopod Pachydiscus
  †Pachydiscus
- †Pachymelania
- †Paladmete
  - †Paladmete cancellaria
  - †Paladmete gardnerae
- †Palaeocypraea
  - †Palaeocypraea grooti – type locality for species
- Panopea
  - †Panopea decisa
- †Paralbula
  - †Paralbula casei
- † Paranomia
  - †Paranomia scabra
- †Paranomotodon
  - †Paranomotodon agustidens
  - †Paranomotodon angustidens
- †Parietiplicatum – or unidentified comparable form
  - †Parietiplicatum conicum
- †Parmicorbula
  - †Parmicorbula bisulcata
- Patella
  - †Patella tentorium
- †Pecten
- Pholadomya
  - †Pholadomya occidentalis
- Pholas – tentative report
- †Pinna
  - †Pinna laqueata
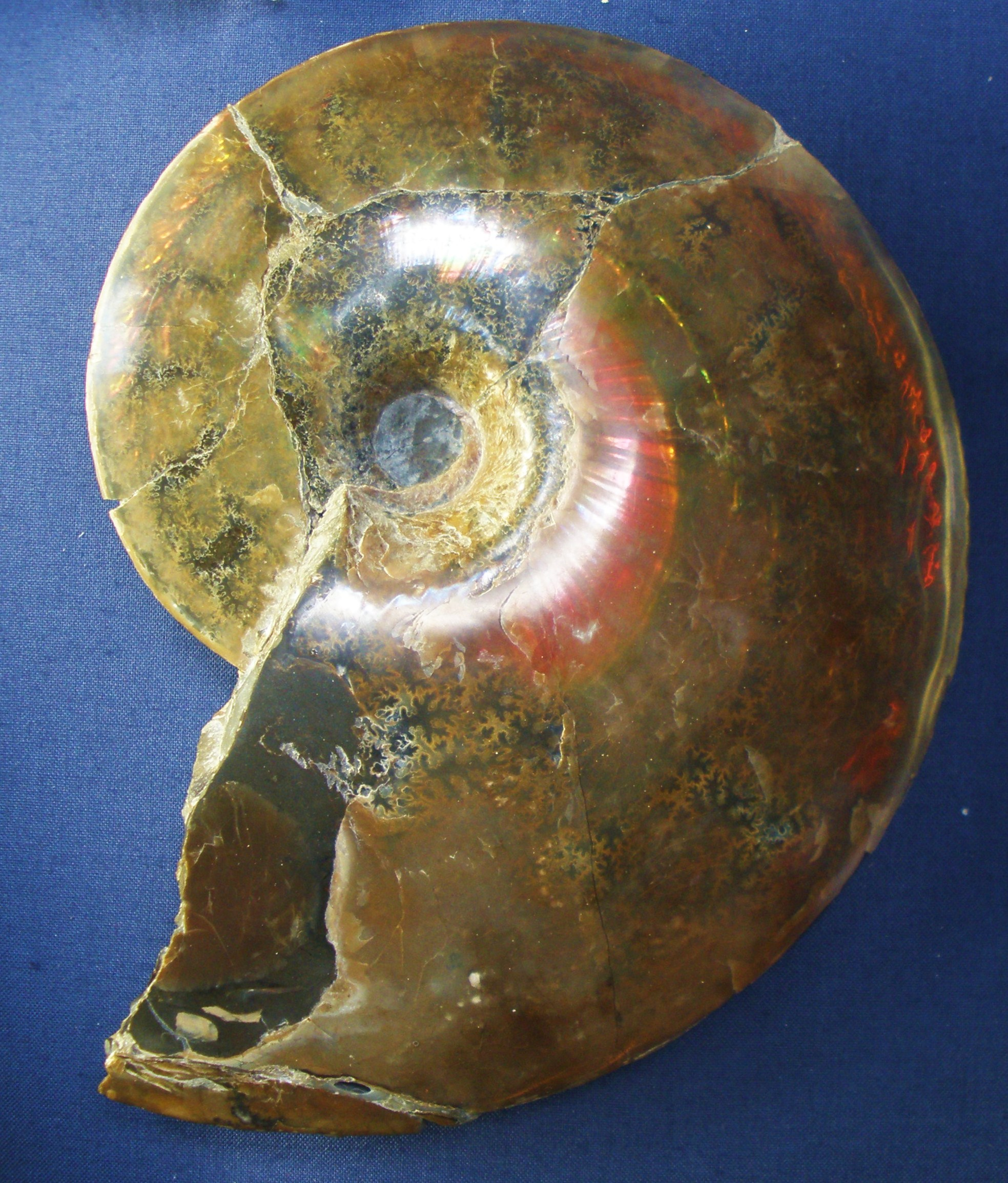
- Fossilized shell of the Late Cretaceous ammonoid cephalopod Placenticeras
  †Placenticeras
  - †Placenticeras placenta
  - †Placenticeras syrtale
- †Pleuriocardia – or unidentified related form
  - †Pleuriocardia donohuensis
- †Pleurocardia – tentative report
  - †Pleurocardia uniformis
- †Plicatolamna
  - †Plicatolamna arcuata
- Plicatula
  - †Plicatula mullicaensis
- †Postligata
  - †Postligata crenata
  - †Postligata wordeni
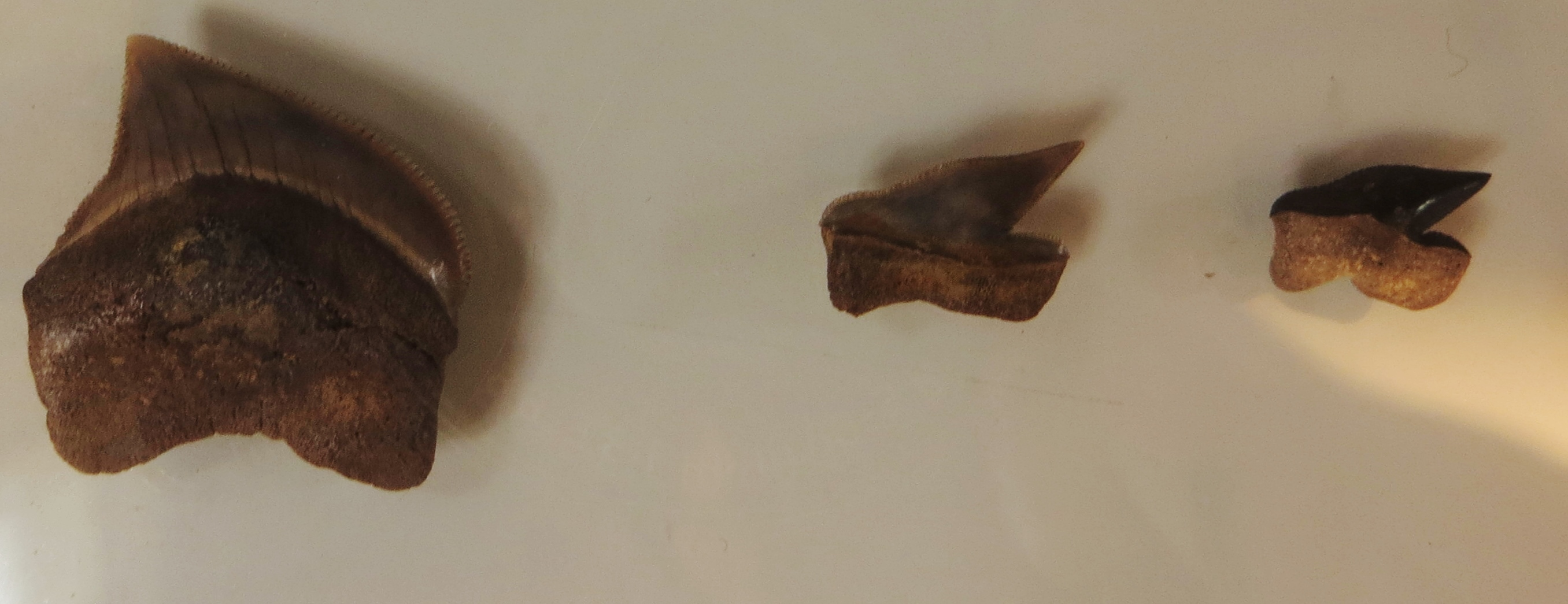
- Fossilized teeth of the Cretaceous shark Pseudocorax
  †Pseudocorax
  - †Pseudocorax granti
- †Pseudohypolophus
- †Pseudolimea
  - †Pseudolimea kerri
  - †Pseudolimea reticulata
- Pseudomalaxis
- †Pseudoschloenbachia
  - †Pseudoschloenbachia chispaensis – or unidentified comparable form
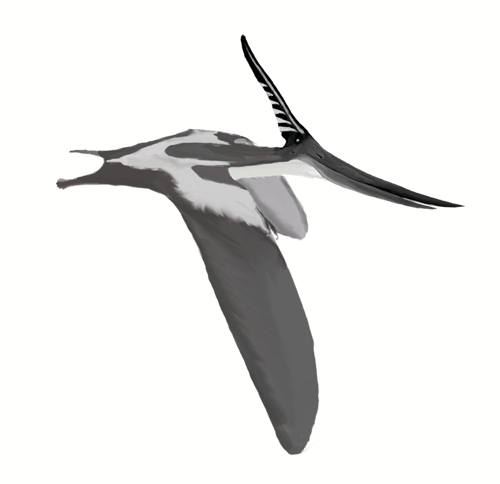
- Life restoration of the Late Cretaceous pterosaur Pteranodon
  †Pteranodon – tentative report
- †Pteria
- †Pterocerella – or unidentified comparable form
  - †Pterocerella poinsettiformis
- †Pterotrigonia
  - †Pterotrigonia bartrami
  - †Pterotrigonia eufaulensis
  - †Pterotrigonia thoracia
- †Ptychotrygon
  - †Ptychotrygon vermiculata
- Pycnodonte
  - †Pycnodonte mutabilis
- †Pygurostoma
  - †Pygurostoma geometricum
- †Pyrifusus
  - †Pyrifusus sinuocostatus
- †Pyropsis
  - †Pyropsis perlata

== R ==
- †Radiopecten
  - †Radiopecten mississippiensis
- †Remera – tentative report
- Rhinobatos
  - †Rhinobatos casieri
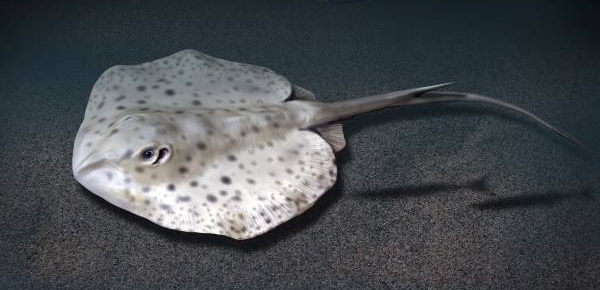
- Restoration of the Late Cretaceous-Paleocene ray Rhombodus
  †Rhombodus
  - †Rhombodus laevis
- Ringicula
- †Ripleyella

== S ==
- †Sargana
- †Scambula
  - †Scambula perplana
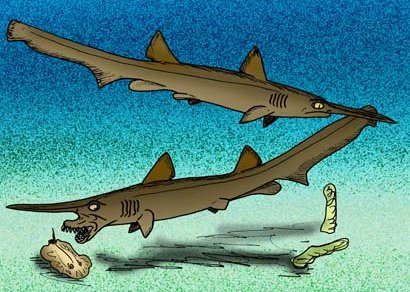
- Restoration of several of the Early Cretaceous-Miocene shark Scapanorhynchus
  †Scapanorhynchus
  - †Scapanorhynchus texanus
- †Scaphites
  - †Scaphites hippocrepis
- †Sclerorhynchus
- Serpula
- †Solenoceras
  - †Solenoceras annulifer
- †Sourimis – or unidentified comparable form
  - †Sourimis georgiana
- †Spiroxybeloceras
  - †Spiroxybeloceras meekanum
- Spondylus
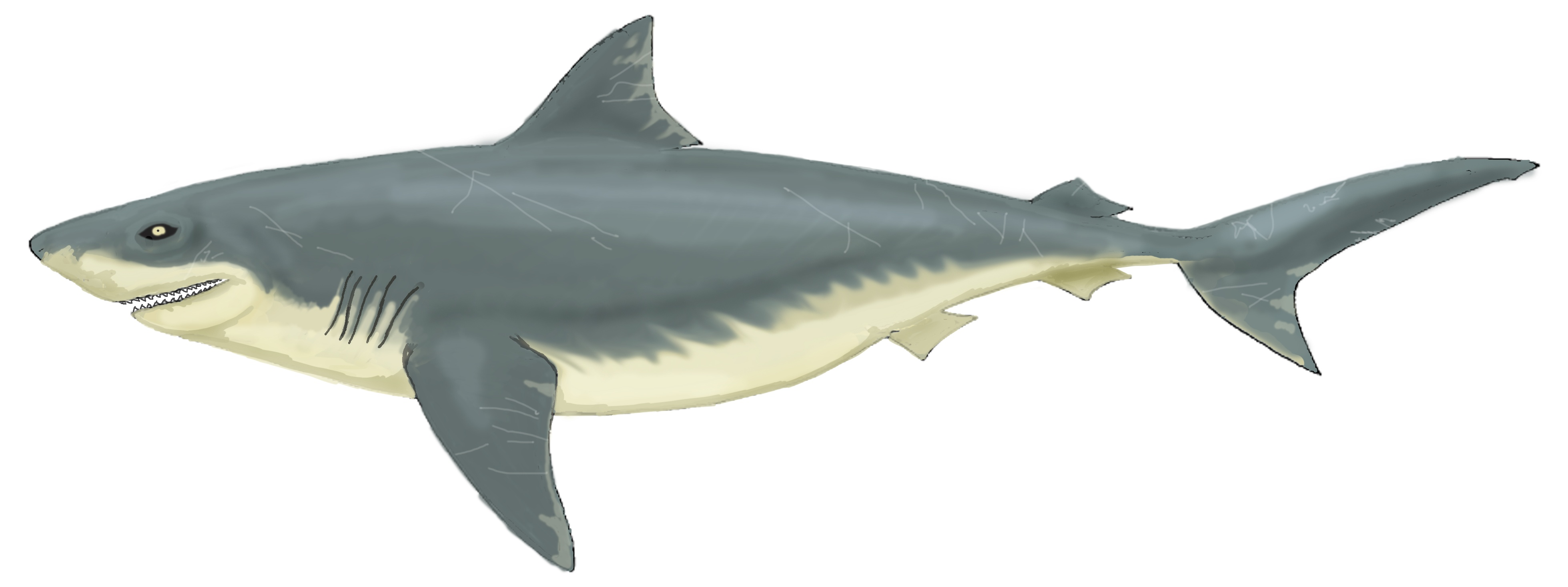
- Life restoration of the Late Cretaceous shark Squalicorax
  Squalicorax
  - †Squalicorax falcatus
  - †Squalicorax kaupi
  - †Squalicorax pristodontus
- Squatina
  - †Squatina hassei
- †Stephanodus
- †Submortoniceras
  - †Submortoniceras punctatum
  - †Submortoniceras uddeni
- †Syncyclonema
  - †Syncyclonema conradi
  - †Syncyclonema simplicius
- †Synodontaspis
  - †Synodontaspis holmdelensis

== T ==
- Tellina
- †Tenea
- Terebratulina
  - †Terebratulina cooperi
- †Texanites
- †Tintorium – tentative report
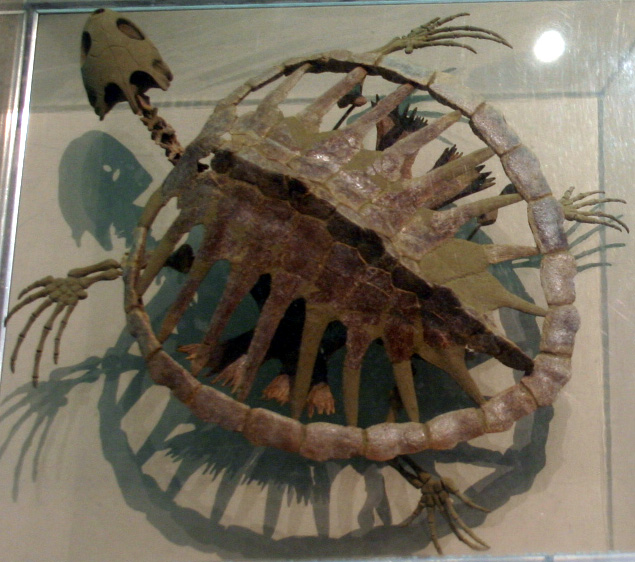
- Mounted fossilized skeleton of the Late Cretaceous sea turtle Toxochelys
  †Toxochelys
- Trachycardium
  - †Trachycardium eufaulensis
  - †Trachycardium longstreeti – tentative report
- †Trigonia
- Trionyx
  - †Trionyx halophilus – type locality for species
- †Tundora – or unidentified comparable form
  - †Tundora tuberculata
- Turritella
  - †Turritella lorillardensis
  - †Turritella macnairyensis
  - †Turritella marshalltownensis
  - †Turritella merchantvillensis
  - †Turritella quadrilira
  - †Turritella tippana
  - †Turritella trilira
  - †Turritella vertebroides
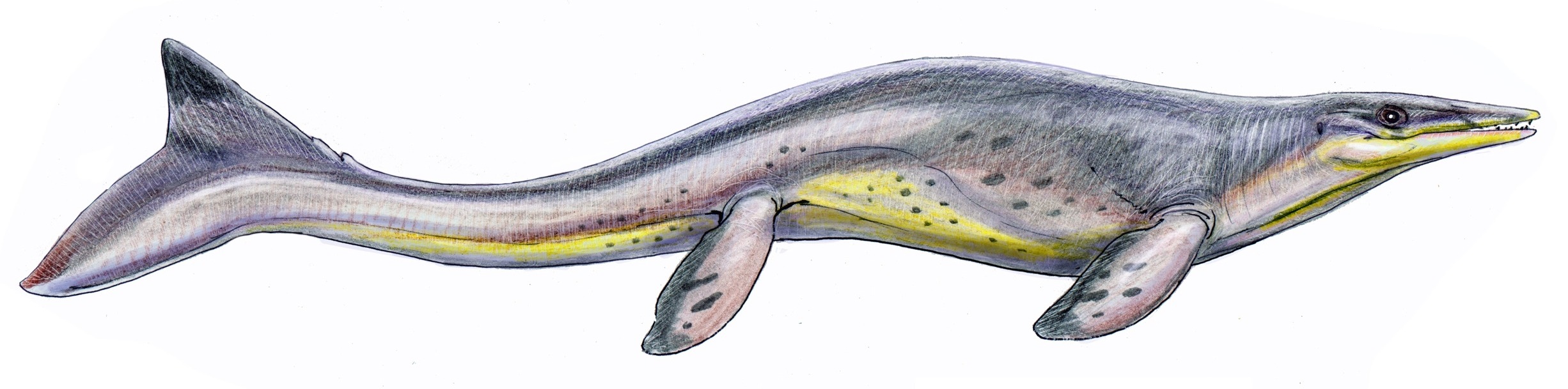
- Restoration of the Late Cretaceous mosasaur Tylosaurus
  †Tylosaurus
- Tympanotonos – or unidentified comparable form
  - †Tympanotonos cretacea

== U ==
- †Unicardium – or unidentified comparable form
  - †Unicardium umbonatum
- †Urceolabrum
  - †Urceolabrum mantachieensis – tentative report

== V ==
- †Veniella
  - †Veniella conradi
- †Vetericardiella
  - †Vetericardiella subcircula
- †Volutomorpha

== W ==
- †Wadeopsamea – tentative report
- †Weeksia
- †Woodsella
  - †Woodsella typica

== X ==
- Xenophora
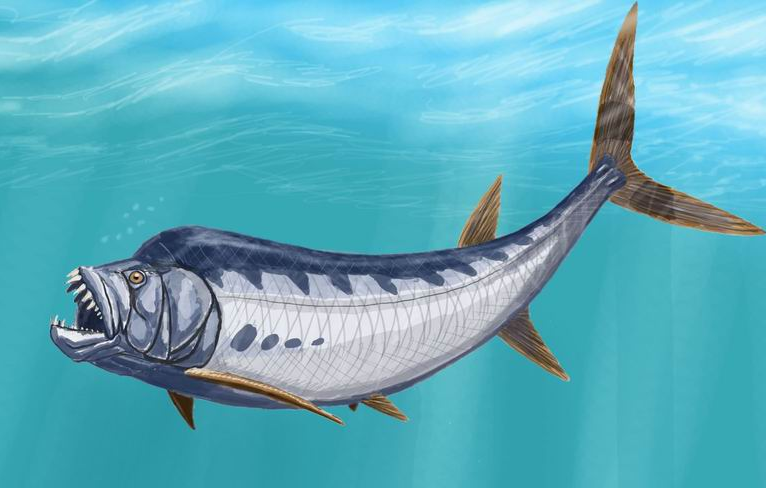
- Life restoration of the Cretaceous bony fish Xiphactinus
  †Xiphactinus
