= Protoclupea =

Protoclupea Temporal range: Oxfordian–Early Tithonian ~161–148 Ma

Scientific classification
- Kingdom: Animalia
- Phylum: Chordata
- Class: Actinopterygii
- Order: †Crossognathiformes (?)
- Family: †Varasichthyidae
- Genus: †Protoclupea; Arratia et al., 1975
- Species: †P. chilensis

Binomial name
- †Protoclupea chilensis Arratia et al., 1975

Extinct genus of ray-finned fishes

Protoclupea is an extinct genus of ray-finned fish that lived from the Oxfordian to the early Tithonian stage of the Late Jurassic epoch. It contains one species, Protoclupea chilensis, fossils of which have been found in the Domeyko Range of Antofagasta Region, northern Chile. The genus has been placed in the family Varasichthyidae together with the genera Bobbichthys, Domeykos, Luisichthys and Varasichthys.
