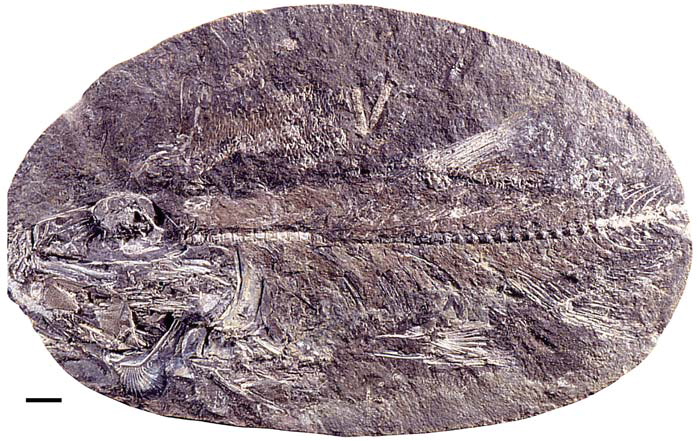
- Fossil

Scientific classification
- Kingdom: Animalia
- Phylum: Chordata
- Class: Actinopterygii
- Order: †Crossognathiformes (?)
- Family: †Varasichthyidae
- Genus: †Varasichthys; Arratia, 1981
- Species: †V. ariasi

Binomial name
- †Varasichthys ariasi Arratia, 1981

= Varasichthys =

Varasichthys Temporal range: Oxfordian

Extinct genus of ray-finned fishes

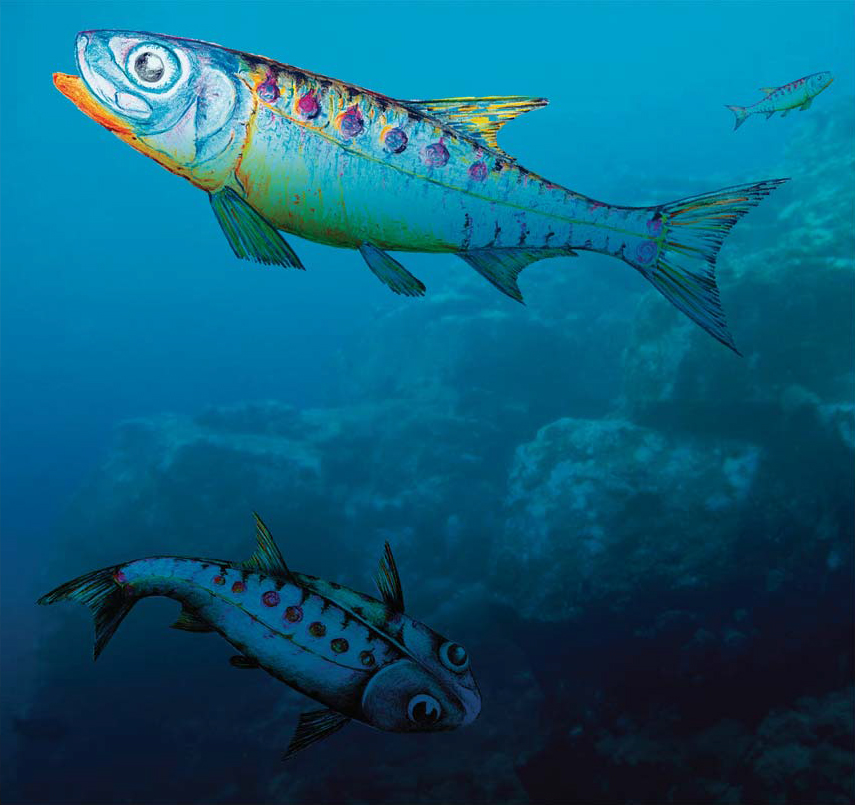
Life restoration of two individuals

Varasichthys is an extinct genus of ray-finned fish that lived during the Oxfordian stage of the Late Jurassic epoch. It contains one species, Varasichthys ariasi, fossils of which have been found in the Domeyko Range of Antofagasta Region, northern Chile. It has been placed in the family Varasichthyidae together with the genera Bobbichthys, Domeykos, Luisichthys and Protoclupea.
