= Domeyko =

Domeyko, Domejko, or Domeiko may refer to:

- Ignacy Domeyko
- Cordillera Domeyko, a mountain range
- 2784 Domeyko, an asteroid

== See also ==
- Domeykos
