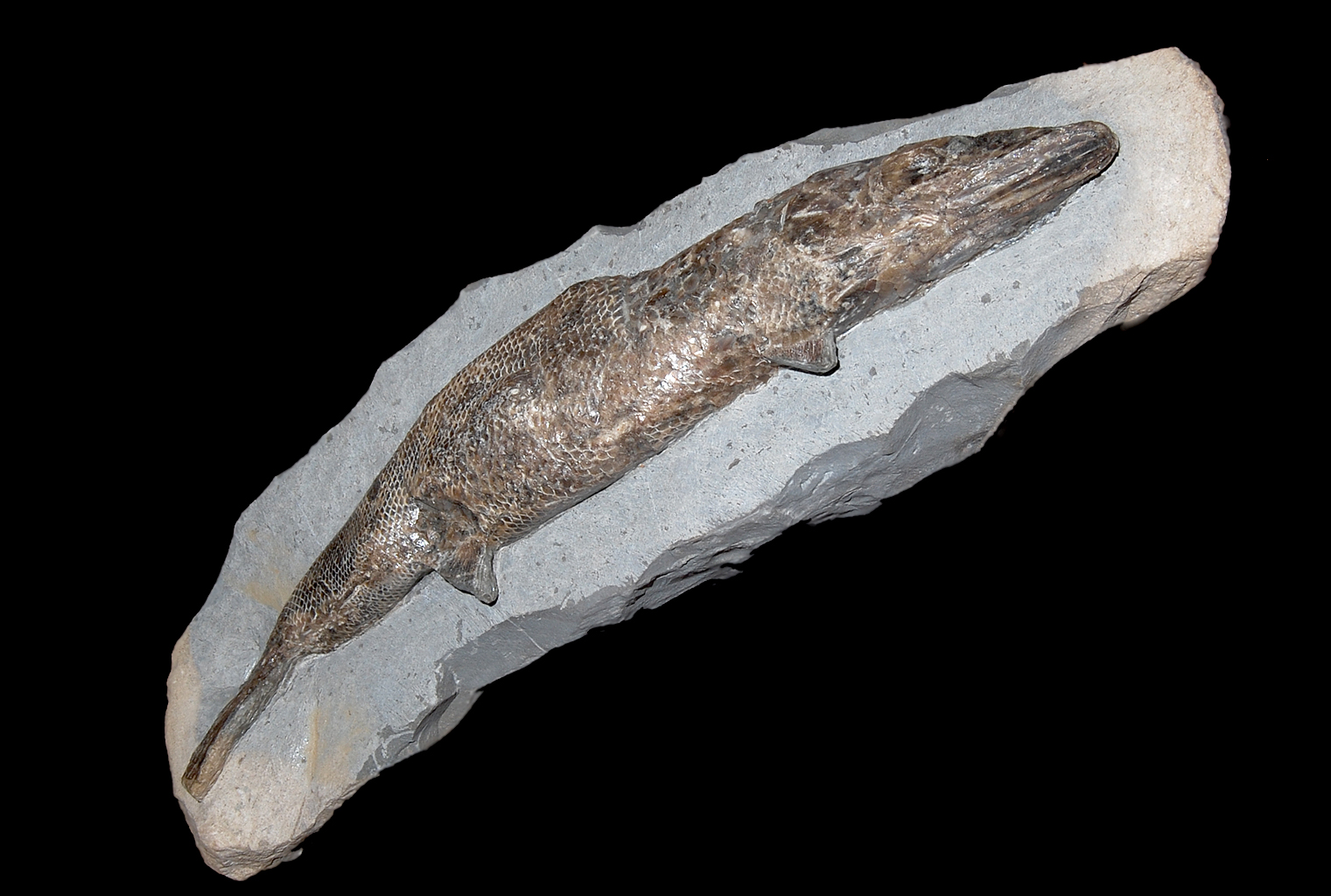
- Rhacolepis fossil

Scientific classification
- Kingdom: Animalia
- Phylum: Chordata
- Class: Actinopterygii
- Division: Teleostei
- Order: †Crossognathiformes; Taverne, 1989

Type genus
- †Crossognathus Pictet, 1858

Subgroups
- See text

= Crossognathiformes =

Crossognathiformes Temporal range: Late Jurassic to Middle Eocene

Extinct order of ray-finned fishes

Crossognathiformes is an extinct order of ray-finned fish that lived from the Late Jurassic to the Eocene. Its phylogenetic placement is disputed; some authors have recovered it as part of the teleost stem group, while others place it in a basal position within crown group Teleostei. Other placements have found it to be polyphyletic, with Varasichthyidae being stem-group teleosts whereas the other, "true" crossognathiforms are crown-group teleosts within Teleocephala.

The oldest definitive crossognathiforms are known from the Late Jurassic (Oxfordian) of Chile. They diversified afterwards and became a dominant group of marine fish throughout much of the Cretaceous. The last surviving member was the pachyrhizodontid Platinx from the Eocene.

== Classification ==
Order Crossognathiformes Taverne, 1989

- Bavarichthys Arratia & Tischlinger, 2010
- Kradimus Veysey et al., 2020
- Family Varasichthyidae Arratia, 1981
  - Bobbichthys Arratia, 1986
  - Domeykos Arratia & Schultze, 1985
  - Luisichthys White, 1942
  - Protoclupea Arratia et al., 1975
  - Varasichthys Arratia, 1981
- Family Chongichthyidae Arratia, 1982
  - Chongichthys Arratia, 1982
- Suborder Crossognathoidei Taverne, 1989
  - Family Crossognathidae Woodward, 1901 [Apsopelicidae Romer, 1966; Syllaemidae Cragin, 1901; Pelecorapidae Cragin, 1901]
    - Apsopelix Cope, 1871 [Helmintholepis Cockerell, 1919; Leptichthys Stewart, 1899; Palaeoclupea Dante, 1942; Pelecorapis Cope, 1874; Syllaemus Cope, 1875]
    - Crossognathus Pictet, 1858
- Suborder Pachyrhizodontoidei Forey, 1977
    - Buapichthys Medina-Castañeda, Cantalice & Castañeda-Posadas, 2025
  - Family Notelopidae Forey, 1977
    - Notelops Woodward, 1901
  - Family Pachyrhizodontidae Cope, 1872 [Greenwoodellidae Taverne, 1973; Thrissopatrinae Boulenger, 1904b]
    - Apricenapiscis Taverne, 2013
    - Aquilopiscis Cumbaa & Murray, 2008
    - Cavinichthys Taverne & Capasso, 2019
    - Elopopsis Heckel, 1856
    - Goulmimichthys Cavin, 1995
    - Greenwoodella Taverne & Ross, 1973
    - Hemielopopsis Bassani, 1879
    - Lebrunichthys Taverne & Capasso, 2020
    - Michin Alvarado-Ortega et al., 2008
    - Motlayoichthys Arratia et al., 2018
    - Nardopiscis Taverne, 2008
    - Pachyrhizodus Dixon, 1850 [Acrodontosaurus Mason, 1869; Eurychir Jordan, 1924; Oricardinus Cope, 1872; Thrissopater Günther, 1872 sensu Forey, 1977]
    - Phacolepis Agassiz, 1841 [Rhacolepis Agassiz, 1841 non Frenguelli, 1942]
    - Platinx Agassiz, 1835
    - Polcynichthys London & Shimada, 2020
    - Rhacolepis Agassiz, 1843
    - Stanhopeichthys Taverne & Capasso, 2020
    - Tingitanichthys Taverne, 1996

== Bibliography ==
- Sepkoski, Jack (2002). "A compendium of fossil marine animal genera". Bulletins of American Paleontology. 363: 1–560. Archived from the original on July 23, 2011.
