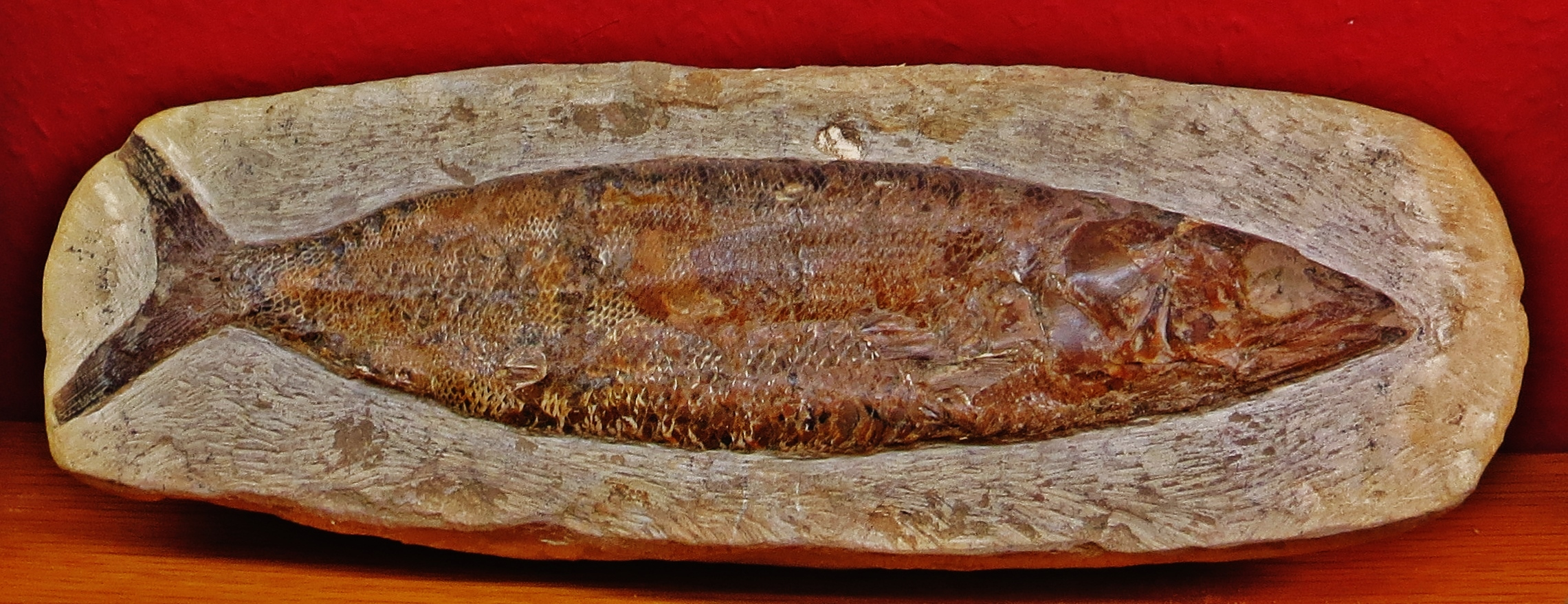
- Rhacolepis buccalis

Scientific classification
- Kingdom: Animalia
- Phylum: Chordata
- Class: Actinopterygii
- Order: †Crossognathiformes
- Family: †Pachyrhizodontidae
- Genus: †Rhacolepis; Agassiz, 1841

Type species
- Rhacolepis buccalis Agassiz, 1841

Species
- R. buccalis Agassiz, 1841; R. latus Agassiz, 1841

= Rhacolepis =

Rhacolepis Temporal range: Aptian ~119–113 Ma

Extinct genus of ray-finned fishes

Rhacolepis is an extinct genus of ray-finned fish from the Cretaceous Romualdo Formation of Brazil. Complete fossilised hearts from this species have been recovered.

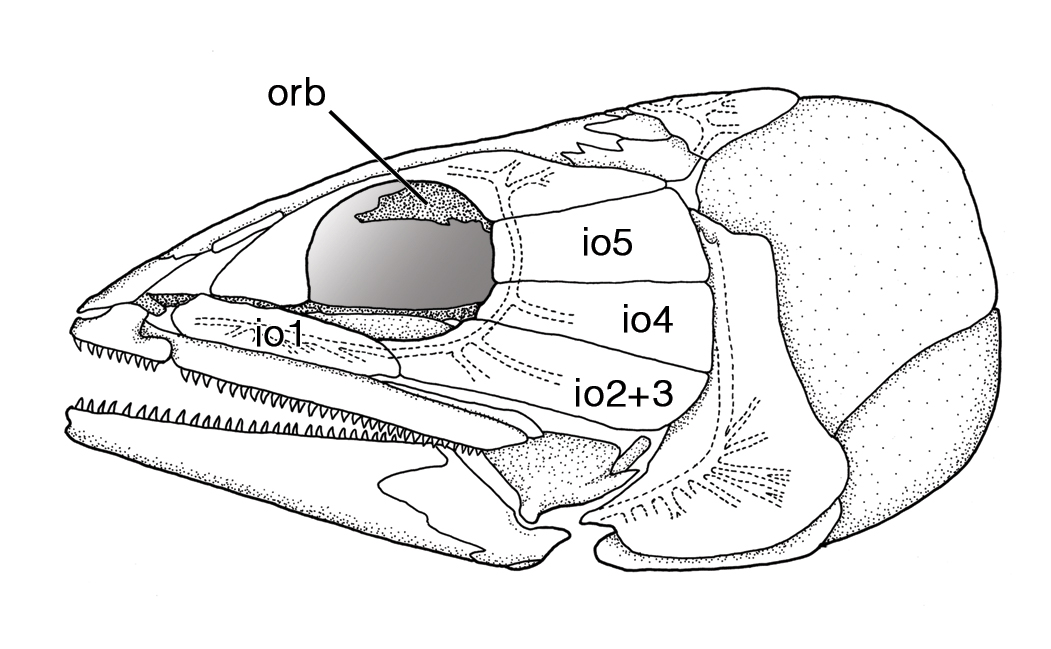
R. buccalis skull

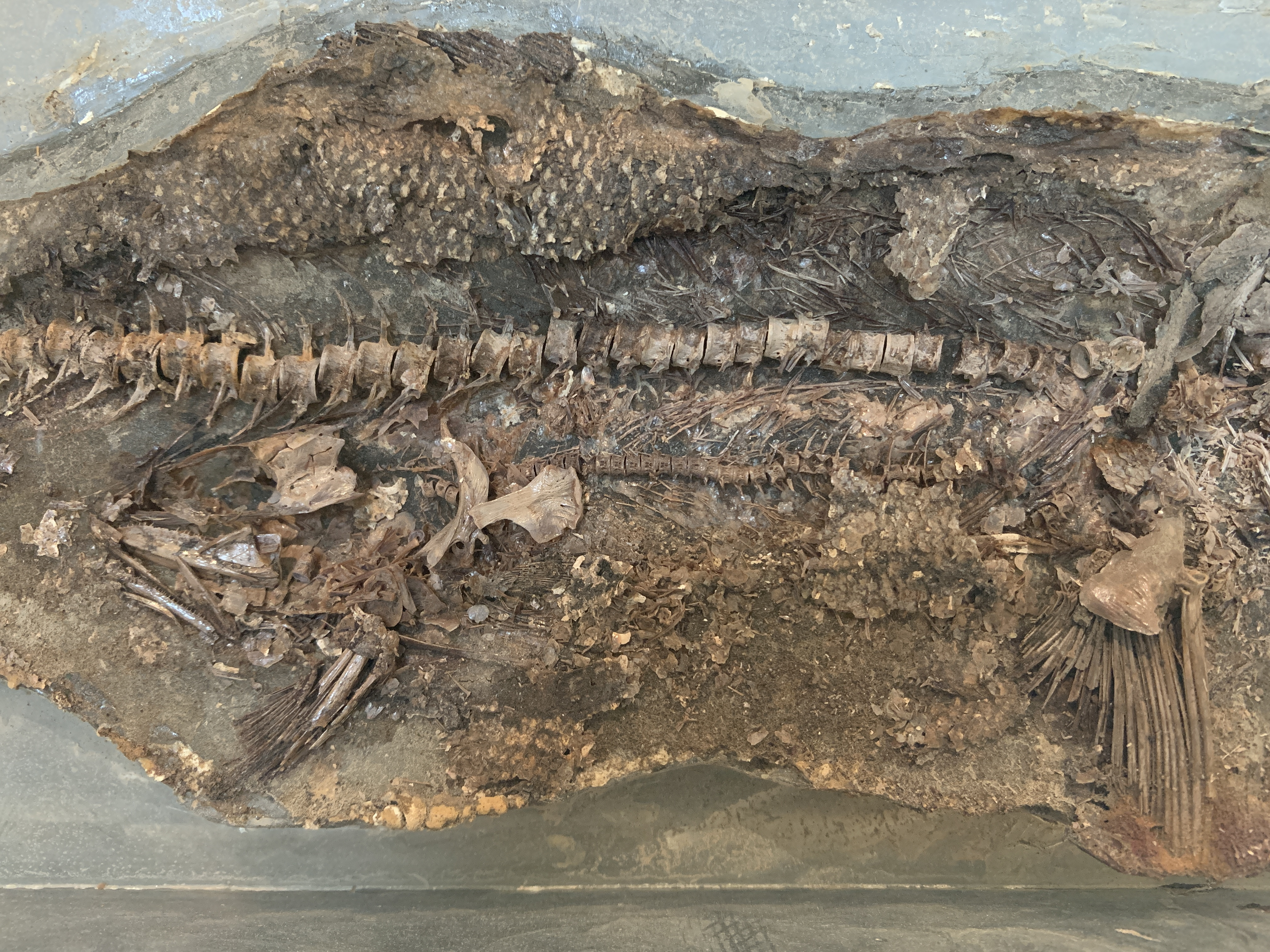
Inside the stomach of a Notelops brama.

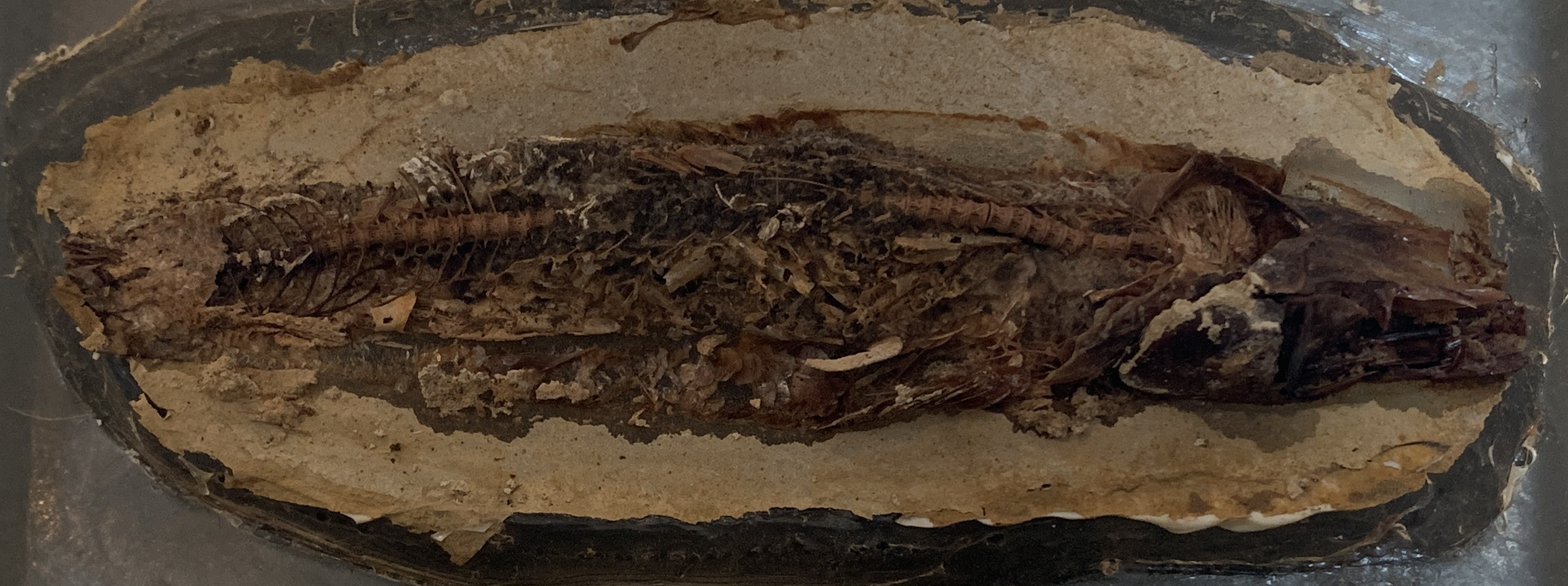
R. buccalis with several hundred small shrimp in stomach.

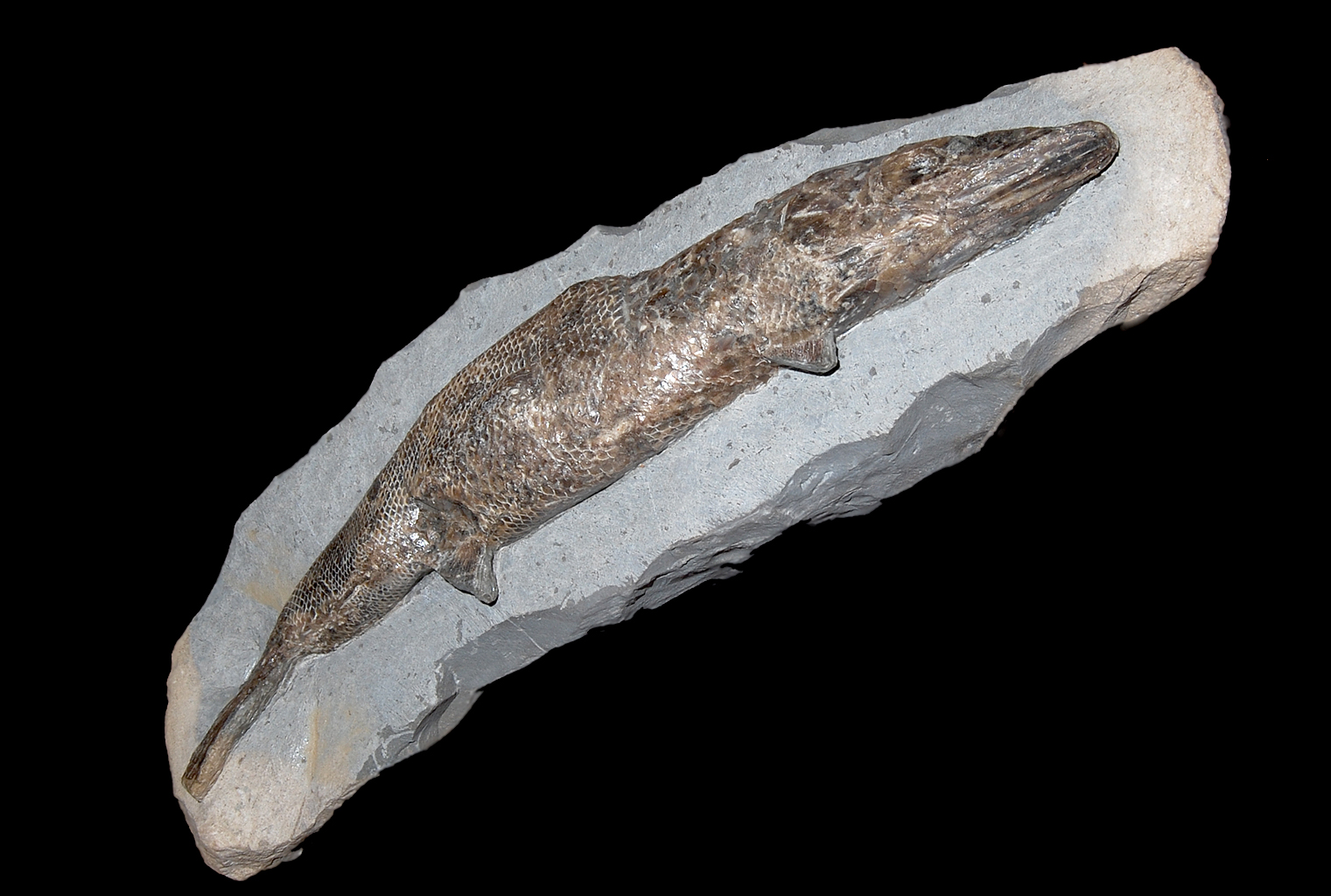
Fossil in Vienna
