= Greenwoodella =

Greenwoodella Temporal range: Early Aptian

Scientific classification
- Kingdom: Animalia
- Phylum: Chordata
- Class: Actinopterygii
- Order: †Crossognathiformes
- Family: †Pachyrhizodontidae
- Genus: †Greenwoodella; Taverne & Ross, 1973
- Species: †G. tockensis

Binomial name
- †Greenwoodella tockensis Taverne & Ross, 1973

Extinct genus of ray-finned fishes

Greenwoodella is an extinct genus of marine ray-finned fish from the Early Cretaceous of Europe. It contains a single species, G. tockensis, from the Aptian of Helgoland Island, Germany. It is the oldest known member of the family Pachyrhizodontidae.
