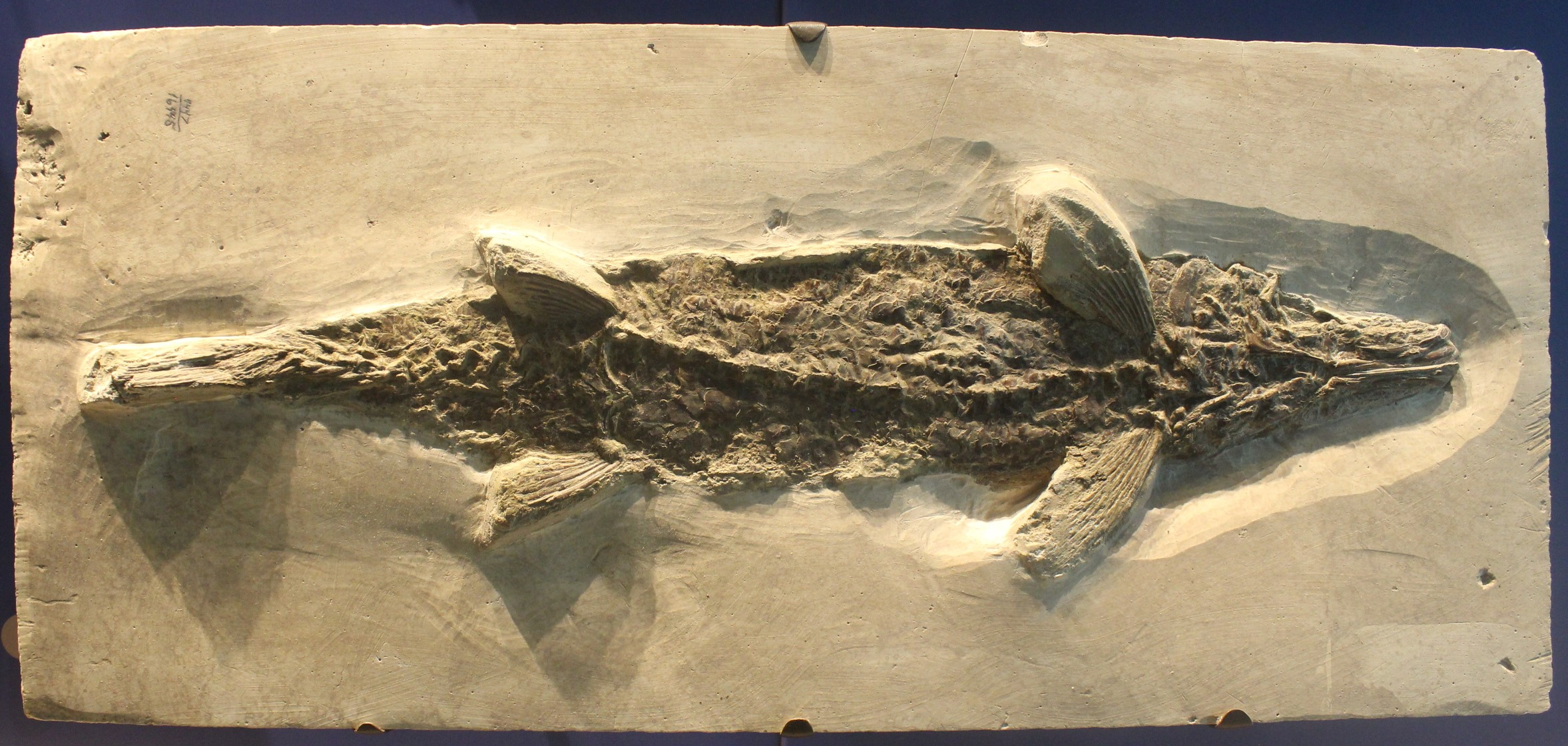
- Apsopelix anglicus fossil (LACM 16445), Natural History Museum of Los Angeles County

Scientific classification
- Kingdom: Animalia
- Phylum: Chordata
- Class: Actinopterygii
- Order: †Crossognathiformes
- Suborder: †Crossognathoidei
- Family: †Crossognathidae
- Genus: †Apsopelix; Cope, 1871

Species
- †A. anglicus (Dixon, 1850); †A. miyazakii (Yabumoto et al., 2012)

Synonyms
- Apsopelix sauriformis Cope, 1871; Helmintholepis Cockerell, 1919; Leptichthys Stewart, 1899; Palaeoclupea Dante, 1942; Pelecorapis Cope, 1874; Syllaemus Cope, 1875

= Apsopelix =

Apsopelix Temporal range: Late Cretaceous (Cenomanian-Campanian) ~95–80 Ma

Extinct genus of ray-finned fishes

Apsopelix is an extinct genus of ray-finned fish that existed about 95-80 million years ago in the shallow waters of the Western Interior Seaway, Hudson Seaway, England, France, and Japan.

== Description ==
Apsopelix was a small teleost, reaching lengths of 23-27 centimeters (9-10 inches). Fossils possess long gill rakers, which are indicative of a microphagous lifestyle, and evidence of a long gut alongside a robust body show that Apsopelix likely fed on plankton.

== Classification ==
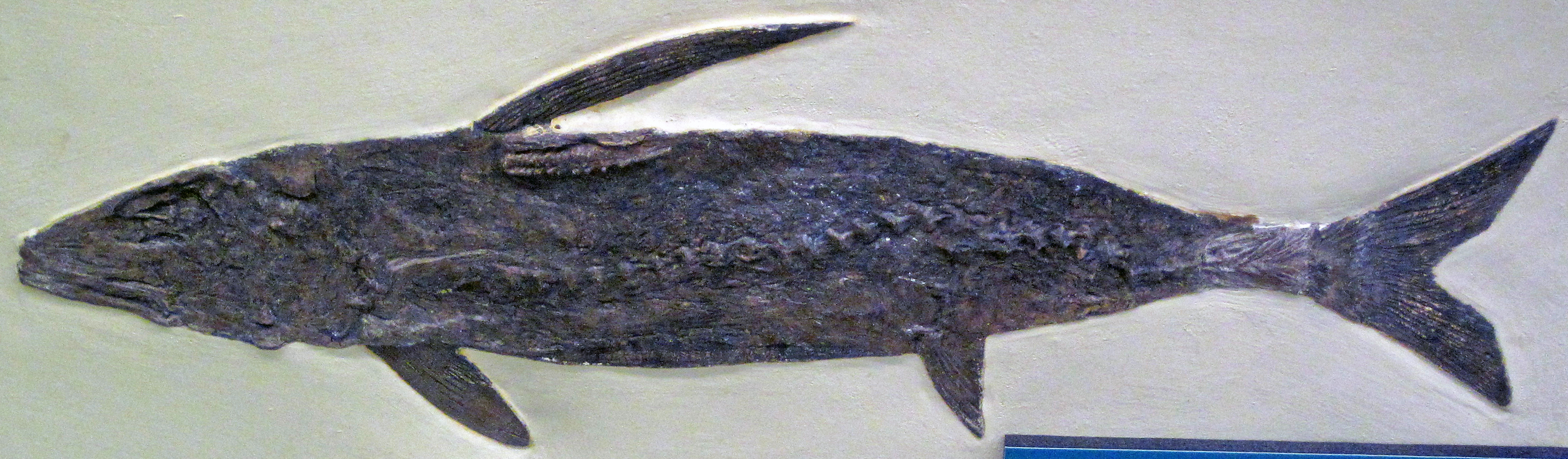
Apsopelix sp. fossil

The genus Apsopelix has a confusing taxonomic history, with several genera being lumped into it over time. Fossils of the genus found in new locations or preserved unusually would be given distinct genus names, and the holotype specimen was misattributed as a species of Calamopleurus. The genus has also been assigned to a plethora of different teleost groups, such as Mugilidae, Clupeidae, Elopoidei, Clupeomorpha, Osteoglossomorpha, Percesoces, Crossognathidae, Syllaemidae, Pelycorapidae, Apsopelicidae.

Today, Apsopelix is considered to be in the order Crossognathiformes and in the family Crossognathidae, alongside Crossognathus.
