= Guillermo Chong =

Chilean geologist (born 1936)

- Born: November 29, 1936 (age 89); Arica, Chile
- Education: University of Chile
- Known for: Study of Atacama Desert
- Awards: Medalla “Juan Brüggen” (2003); TWAS ROLAC (2010); Distinguished son of Arica (2018)
- Scientific career
- Fields: Geology
- Workplaces: Catholic University of the North

Guillermo Baltazar Chong Díaz is a Chilean geologist and professor at the Catholic University of the North at Antofagasta, Chile. In 2018 he was named distinguished son (Spanish: hijo ilustre) of Arica. The mineral chongite and the extinct fish Chongichthys are named after him.

In 2011, together with Zulma Brandoni de Gasparini and others, Chong Díaz discovered a well-preserved fossilized skull of the family Metriorhynchidae. The team determined it to be a specimen of Metriorhynchus westermanni, an extinct marine crocodyliform.
