= Chongichthys =

Chongichthys Temporal range: Oxfordian ~161–155.7 Ma

Scientific classification
- Kingdom: Animalia
- Phylum: Chordata
- Class: Actinopterygii
- Order: †Crossognathiformes
- Family: †Chongichthyidae; Arratia, 1982
- Genus: †Chongichthys; Arratia, 1982
- Species: †C. dentatus

Binomial name
- †Chongichthys dentatus Arratia, 1982

Extinct genus of ray-finned fishes

Chongichthys is an extinct genus of marine ray-finned fish that lived during the Oxfordian stage of the Late Jurassic epoch. It contains one species, C. dentatus from the Quebrada El Profeta of Chile. It is named after Chilean geologist Guillermo Chong.

Its phylogenetic relationships have long been enigmatic, with it initially being classified as an indeterminate teleost, or more specifically an indeterminate clupeocephalan. However, more recent studies have recovered it as a basal crossognathiform. It is one of the earliest crossognathiforms known.

== See also ==
- Prehistoric fish
- List of prehistoric bony fish
