= Elopopsis =

Elopopsis Temporal range: Early Cenomanian to Late Turonian

Scientific classification
- Domain: Eukaryota
- Kingdom: Animalia
- Phylum: Chordata
- Class: Actinopterygii
- Order: †Crossognathiformes
- Family: †Pachyrhizodontidae
- Genus: †Elopopsis; Heckel, 1856

Type species
- †Elopopsis fenzli Heckel, 1856

Species
- See text

Extinct genus of ray-finned fishes

Elopopsis (meaning "Elops-like face") is an extinct genus of marine ray-finned fish that lived during the Late Cretaceous ( Cenomanian to Turonian) of Europe, North Africa and North America. It was a member of the Crossognathiformes, in the family Pachyrhizodontidae.

It contains the following species:

- †E. crassus (Dixon, 1850) - early-mid Cenomanian to middle Turonian of England (English Chalk)
- †E. heckeli Reuss, 1857 - Cenomanian of the Czech Republic
- †E. fenzli Heckel, 1856 (type species) - late Cenomanian of Slovenia (Komen Limestone)
- †E. microdon Heckel, 1856 - late Cenomanian of Slovenia (Komen Limestone), Morocco (Jbel Tselfat), and Germany (Hesseltal Formation)
- †E. smithwoodwardi Bayer, 1905 - Turonian of the Czech Republic
- †E. ziegleri von der Marck, 1868 - late Turonian of Germany

Indeterminate remains referable to Elopopsis are known from the Cenomanian of Saskatchewan, Canada (Ashville Formation) and the United States (Greenhorn Limestone of Colorado, Graneros Shale of Nebraska), indicating that they inhabited the Western Interior Seaway early on. The former species "E." dentex from the Komen Limestone appears to be a specimen of Enchodus.

It was likely a predatory fish that fed on smaller fish. A well-preserved specimen of E. microdon from the Hesseltal Formation of Germany has fossilized intestinal casts.
