= Crossognathus =

Crossognathus Temporal range: Barremian to Albian

Scientific classification
- Domain: Eukaryota
- Kingdom: Animalia
- Phylum: Chordata
- Class: Actinopterygii
- Order: †Crossognathiformes
- Family: †Crossognathidae
- Genus: †Crossognathus; Pictet, 1858

Species
- †C. danubiensis Cavin & Grigorescu, 2005; †C. sabaudianus Pictet, 1858

Extinct genus of ray-finned fishes

Crossognathus is an extinct genus of marine ray-finned fish from the Early Cretaceous of Europe. It is the type genus of the order Crossognathiformes and the family Crossognathidae.

The following species are known:

- †C. danubiensis Cavin & Grigorescu, 2005 - Middle Albian of Romania
- †C. sabaudianus Pictet, 1858 (type species) - Barremian of Voiron and late Albian of Vallentigny, France; Barremian of Hildesheim & early Aptian of Helgoland, Germany
