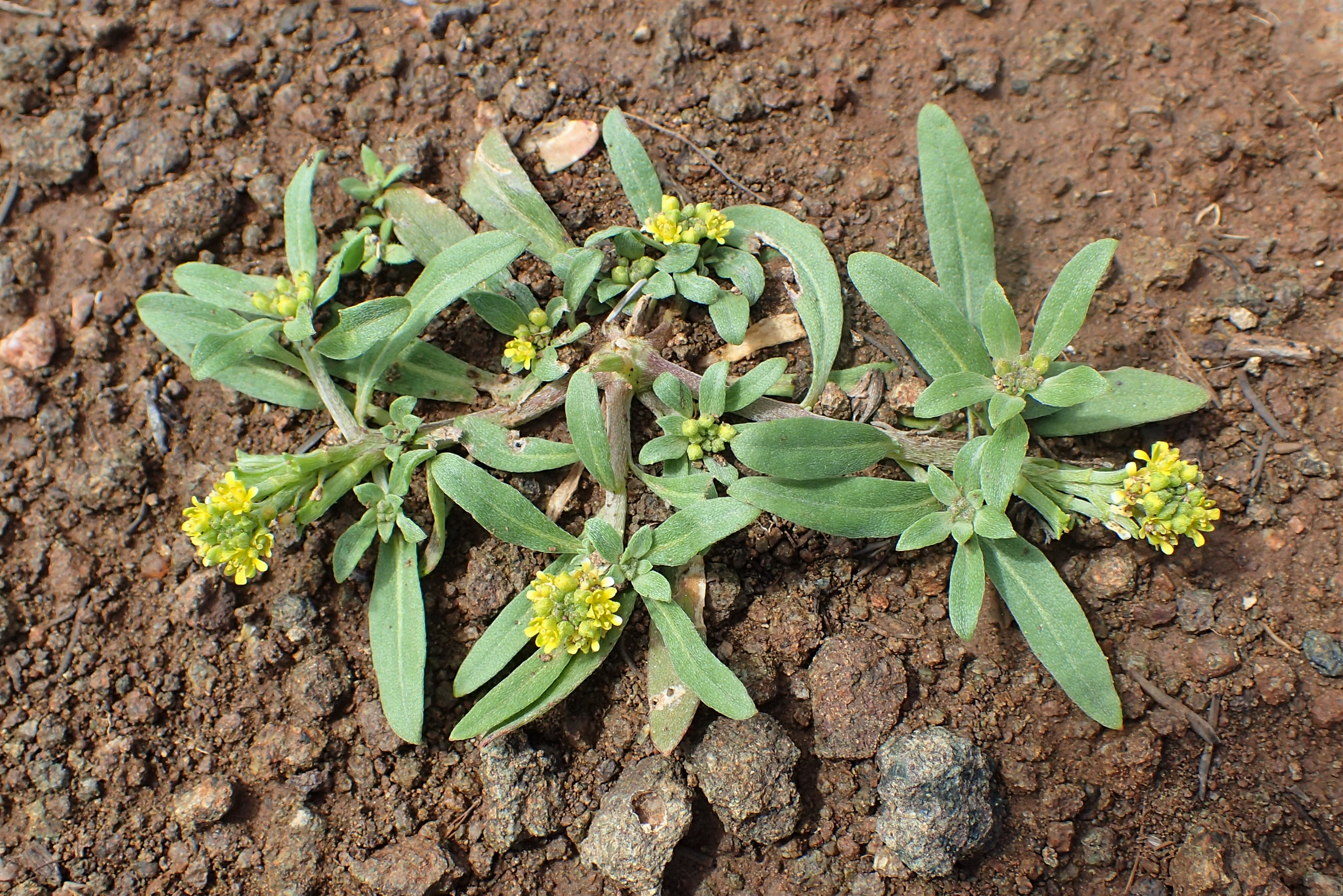

Scientific classification
- Kingdom: Plantae
- Clade: Tracheophytes
- Clade: Angiosperms
- Clade: Eudicots
- Clade: Rosids
- Order: Brassicales
- Family: Brassicaceae
- Genus: Notoceras; W.T.Aiton

= Notoceras =

Genus of plants

Notoceras is a genus of flowering plants belonging to the family Brassicaceae.

Its native range is the Canary Islands, Mauritania, Southeastern Spain, Northern Africa to Western Himalaya and Arabian Peninsula.

== Species ==
Species:

- Notoceras bicorne (Aiton) Amo
