= Acteon cretacea =

Scientific classification
- Kingdom: Animalia
- Phylum: Mollusca
- Class: Gastropoda
- Superfamily: Acteonoidea
- Family: Acteonidae
- Genus: Acteon
- Species: †A. cretacea

Binomial name
- †Acteon cretacea Gabb, 1862

Synonyms
- † Acteon forbesiana Whitfield, 1892

Extinct species of gastropods

Acteon cretacea is an extinct species of sea snail, a marine gastropod mollusc in the family Acteonidae.

== Description ==
(Original description) The subglobose spire is elevated. It contains five convex whorls, sloping on the sides and obliquely truncated above. The body whorl is sub-compressed, most convex above, its width about equal to the length of the aperture. The aperture is narrowed above, wide below and rounded anteriorly. There are two folds on the columella: the upper one heavy and rounded, the lower or anterior one, obsolete. The columellar edge of the body whorl in one of the casts is marked by acute-angular striae, one branch extending directly upwards on the outside of the whorls (inside of the shell), and soon becoming obsolete. The other branch runs into the columellar cavity.

== Distribution ==
Fossils of this marine species have been found in Cretaceous strata in New Jersey, USA.
