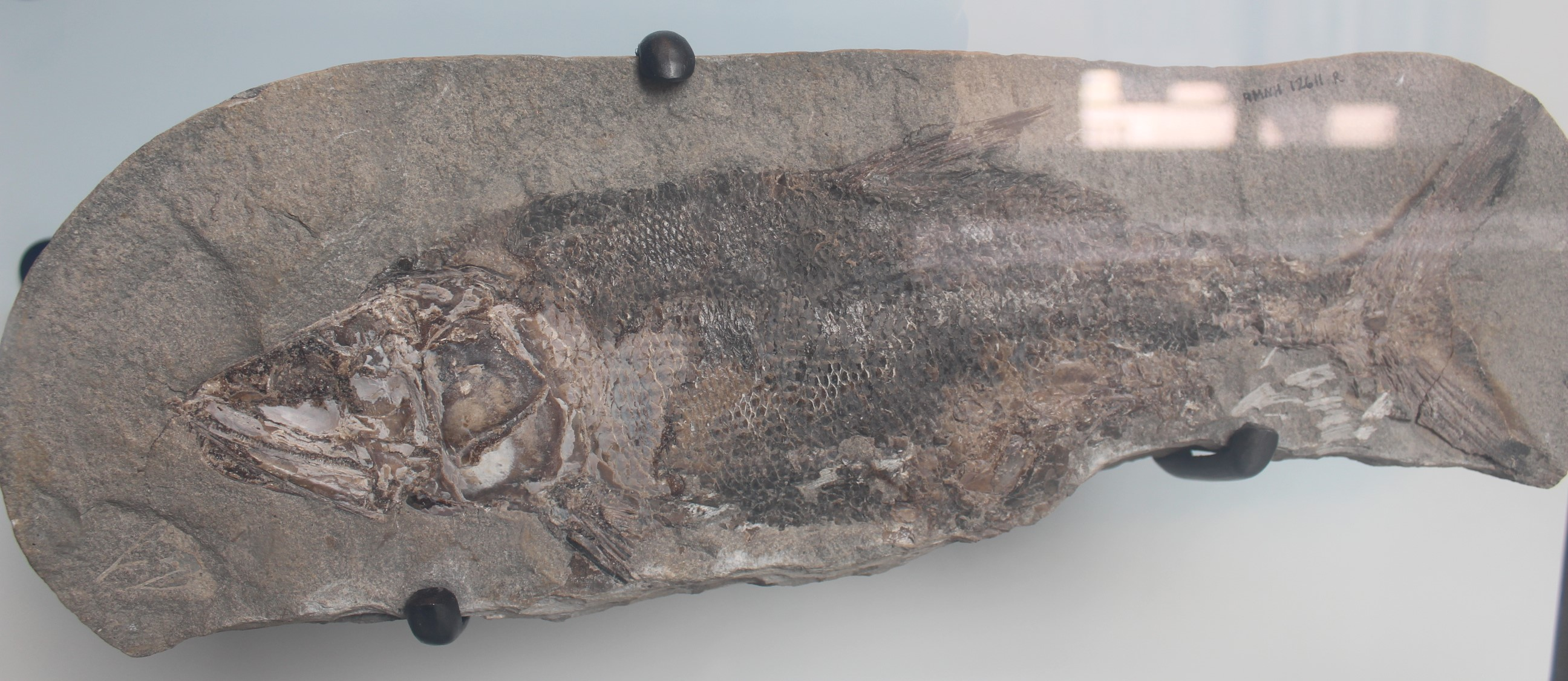
- N. brama fossil, American Museum of Natural History

Scientific classification
- Kingdom: Animalia
- Phylum: Chordata
- Class: Actinopterygii
- Division: Teleostei
- Order: Elopiformes
- Genus: †Notelops; Woodward, 1901

= Notelops =

Extinct genus of ray-finned fishes

Notelops is an extinct genus of ray-finned fish.

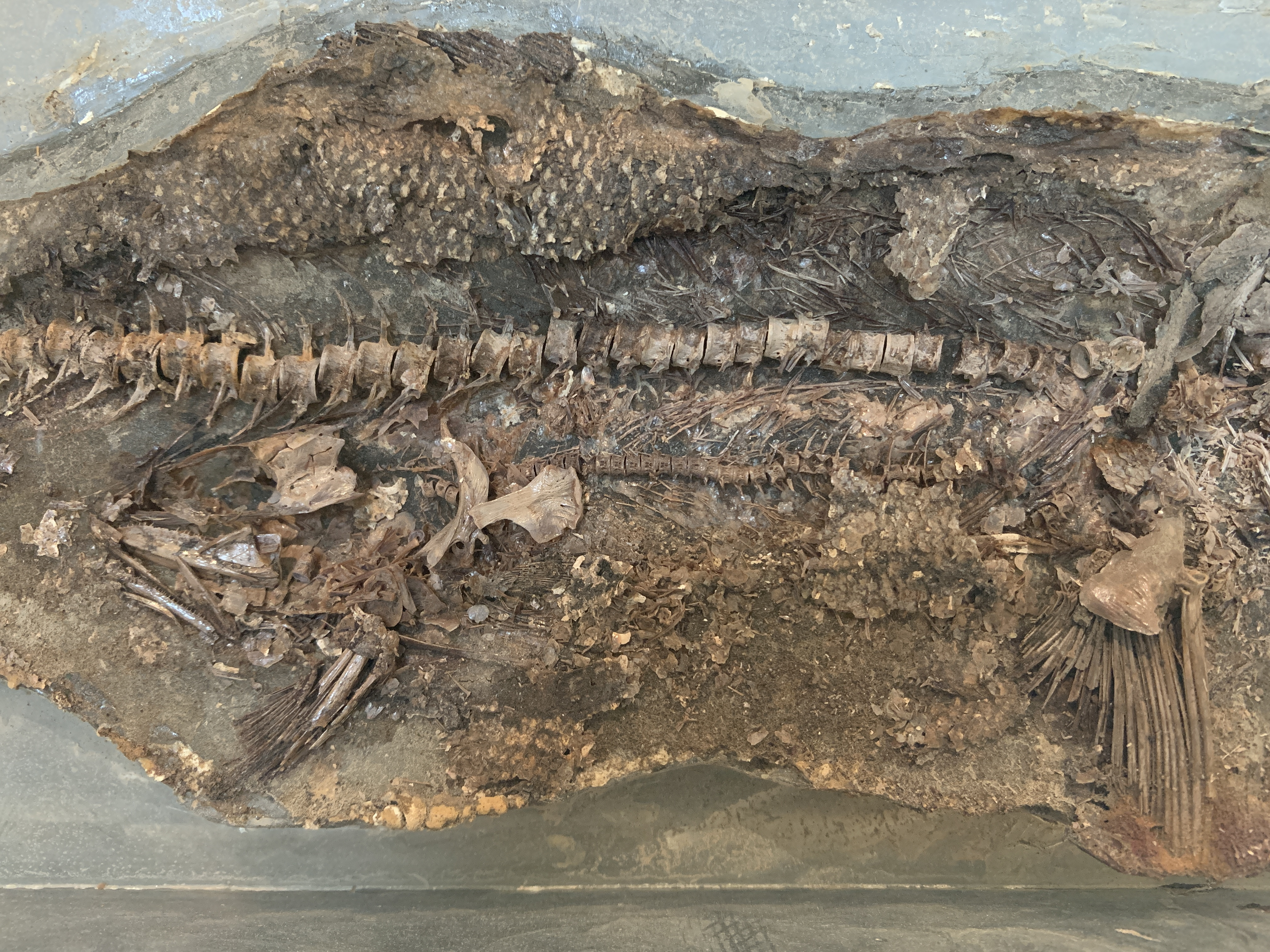
Rhacolepis inside the stomach of a Notelops brama.

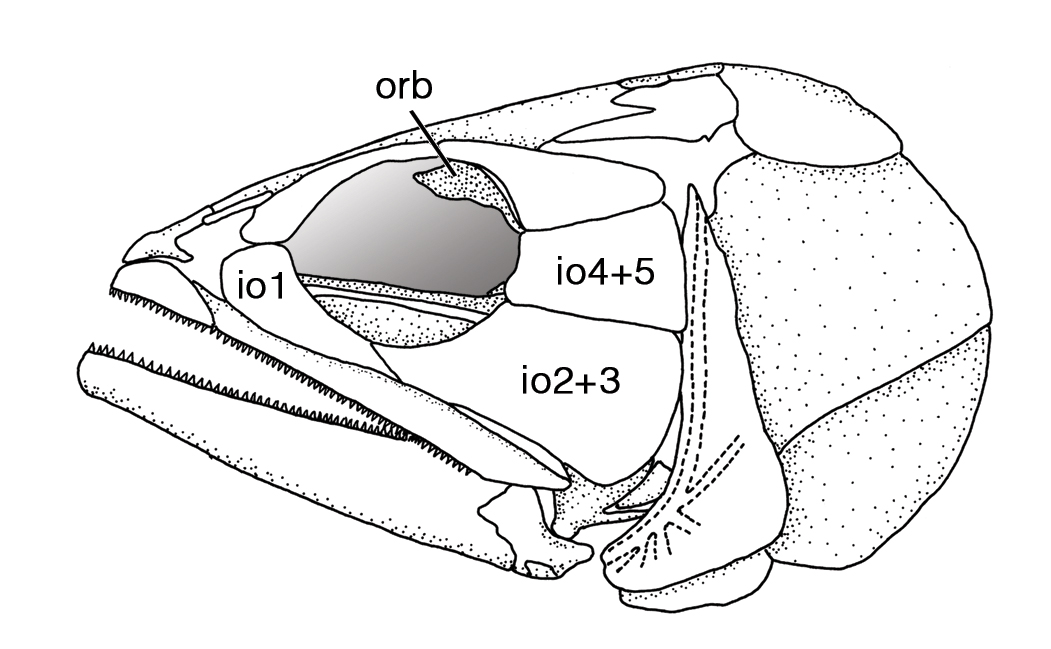
N. brama skull.
