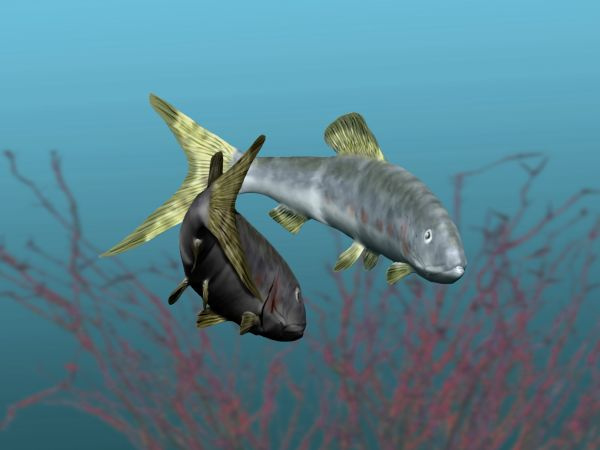
- Life restoration of two individuals

Scientific classification
- Domain: Eukaryota
- Kingdom: Animalia
- Phylum: Chordata
- Class: Actinopterygii
- Order: †Crossognathiformes (?)
- Family: †Varasichthyidae
- Genus: †Luisichthys; White, 1942
- Species: †L. vinalesensis

Binomial name
- †Luisichthys vinalesensis White, 1942

= Luisichthys =

Luisichthys Temporal range: Oxfordian–Early Tithonian

Extinct genus of ray-finned fishes

Luisichthys is an extinct genus of ray-finned fish that lived in what is now Cuba from the Oxfordian to the early Tithonian stage of the Late Jurassic epoch. It contains one species, Luisichthys vinalesensis.
