= Bobbichthys =

Bobbichthys Temporal range: Oxfordian

Scientific classification
- Kingdom: Animalia
- Phylum: Chordata
- Class: Actinopterygii
- Order: †Crossognathiformes (?)
- Family: †Varasichthyidae
- Genus: †Bobbichthys; Arratia, 1986
- Species: †B. opercularis

Binomial name
- †Bobbichthys opercularis Arratia, 1986

Extinct genus of ray-finned fishes

Bobbichthys is an extinct genus of marine ray-finned fish that lived in what is now Chile during the Oxfordian stage of the Late Jurassic epoch. It was a member of the Varasichthyidae, a family of potentially crossognathiform fish.

It was named after paleoichthyologist Bobb Schaefer (1913-2004).

== See also ==
- List of prehistoric bony fish
