= Domeykos =

Domeykos Temporal range: Oxfordian

Scientific classification
- Kingdom: Animalia
- Phylum: Chordata
- Class: Actinopterygii
- Order: †Crossognathiformes (?)
- Family: †Varasichthyidae
- Genus: †Domeykos; Arratia & Schultze, 1985
- Species: †D. profetaensis

Binomial name
- †Domeykos profetaensis Arratia & Schultze, 1985

Extinct genus of ray-finned fishes

Domeykos is an extinct genus of marine ray-finned fish that lived in what is now Chile during the Oxfordian stage of the Late Jurassic epoch. It contains one species, Domeykos profetaensis, known from the Quebrada del Profeta of Antofagasta.
