= Paleobiota of the Niobrara Formation =

List of life forms

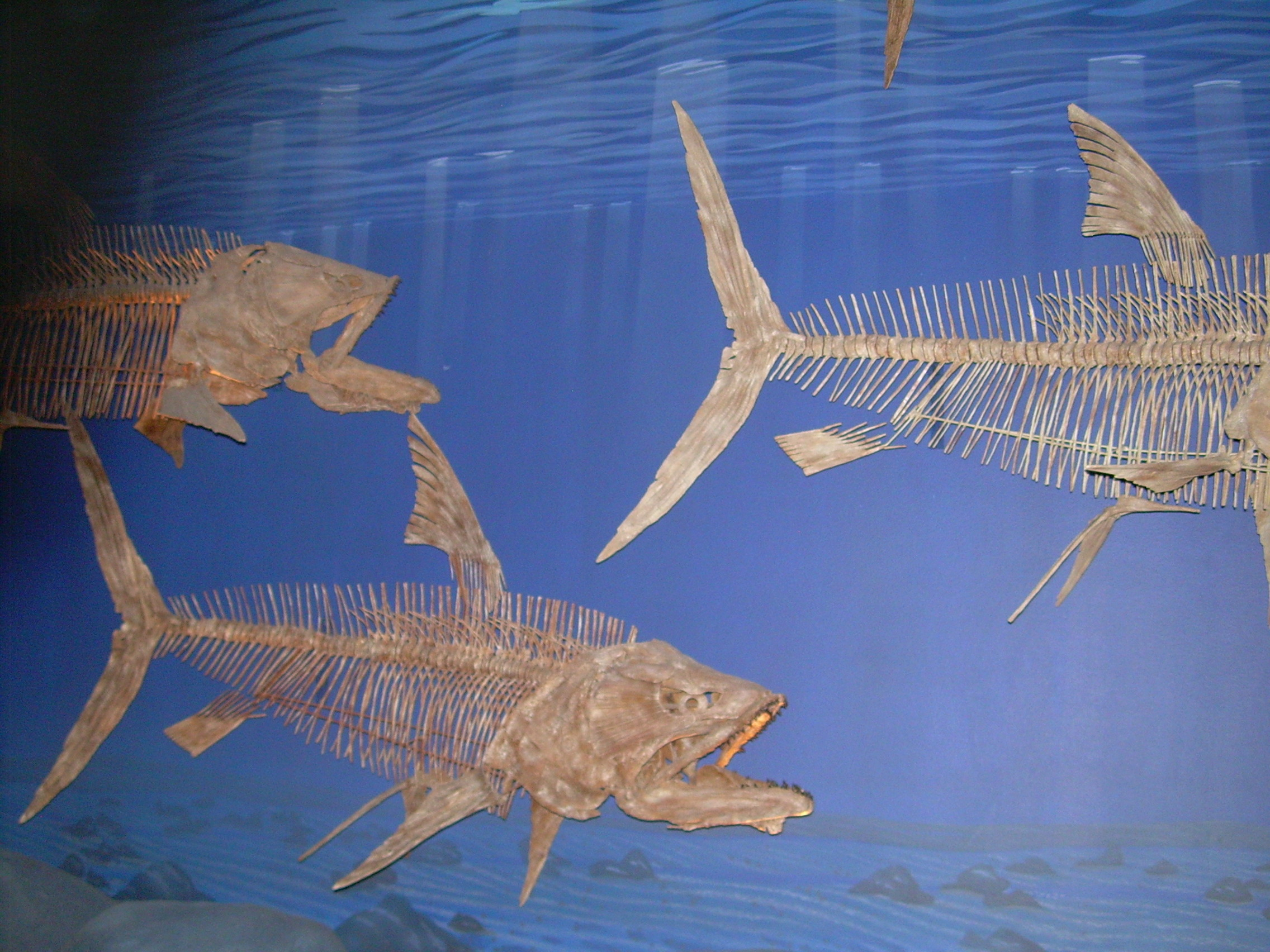
Pachyrhizodus caninus skeletons (casts)

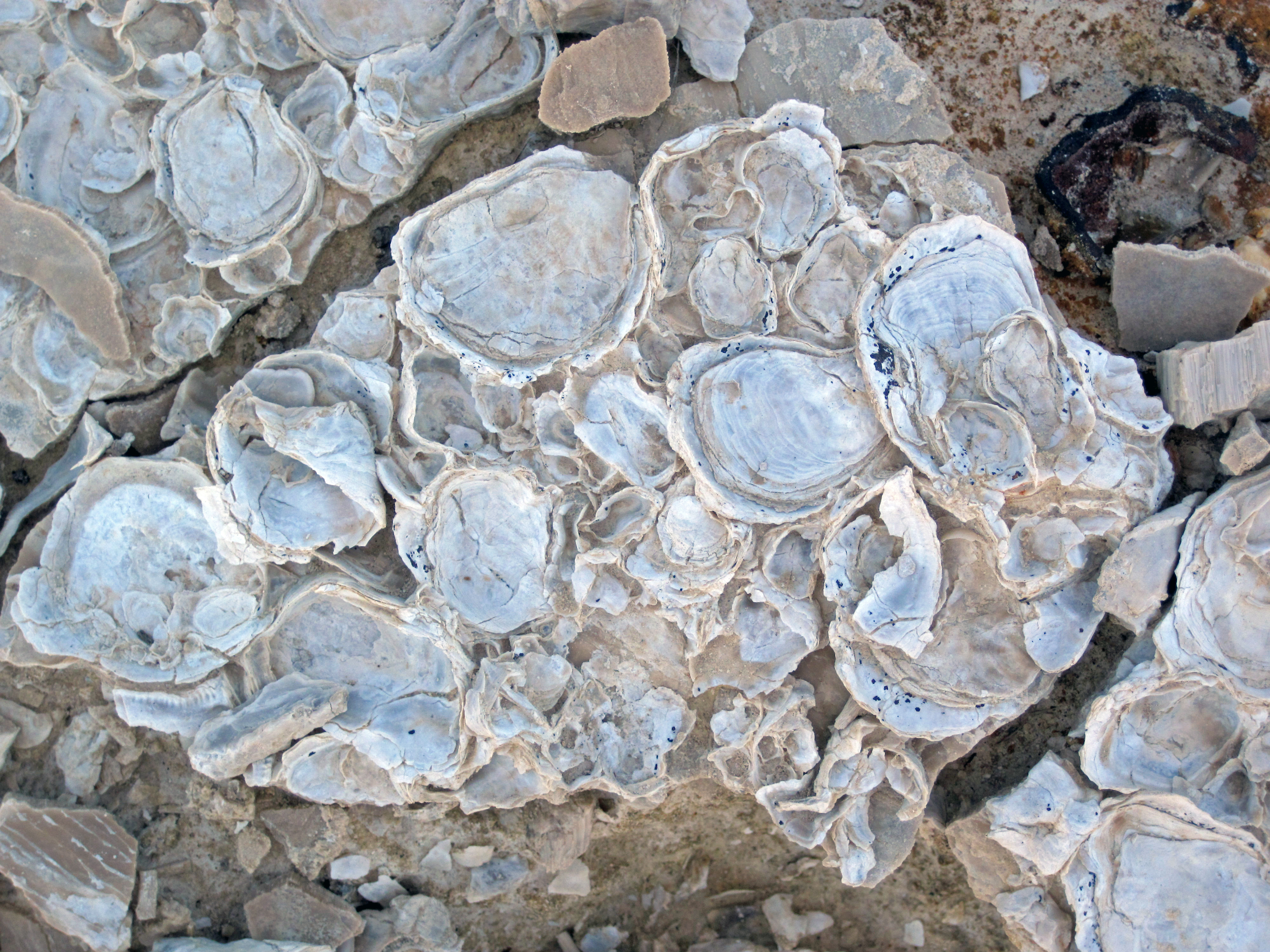
Pseudoperna congesta fossil oysters encrusting a large Platyceramus platinus bivalve shell, Smoky Hill Chalk member of Niobrara Formation . Photo in place at Castle Rock chalk badlands, Kansas.

During the time of the deposition of the Niobrara Chalk, much life inhabited the seas of the Western Interior Seaway. By this time in the Late Cretaceous many new lifeforms appeared such as mosasaurs, which were to be some of the last of the aquatic lifeforms to evolve before the end of the Mesozoic. Life of the Niobrara Chalk is comparable to that of the Dakota Formation, although the Dakota Formation, which was deposited during the Cenomanian, predates the chalk by about 10 million years.

== Table key ==
Color	Explanation
Light grey	A "regular" taxon which the scientific consensus does not regard as a dubious, synonymous, undescribed, or otherwise taxonomically questionable name.
Dark grey	A taxon or parataxon that is misidentified, dubious, synonymous, undescribed, or otherwise taxonomically questionable name.
Peach	An ichnotaxon, a parataxon representing a specific kind of trace fossil.
Light blue	An ootaxon, a parataxon representing a specific kind of fossil egg.
Light green	A morphotaxon, a parataxon representing a single stage or anatomical part of a plant or plant-like organism. Examples include fossil pine cones, fungal spores, and leaves.

== Bony fish ==
Fish are by far the most common fossils found from the formation, with remains of prehistoric sharks, ray-finned fishes, and lobe-finned fishes in abundance. As well as smaller fish, many large predatory fish were present in the seas at that time, most notably Xiphactinus. Several fish were of close relation to modern day fish including primitive coelacanths, slime heads, lancetfish, gars, swordfish, and salmonids.

=== Pycnodontiformes ===
Genus	Species	Member	Age	Abundance	Notes
Micropycnodon	M. kansasensis	Smoky Hill Chalk	Late Coniacian-Satonian		A pycnodontiform fish similar but unrelated to modern parrotfish
Hadrodus	H. marshi	Smoky Hill Chalk	Early Campanian		Family Hadrodontidae Thurmond and Jones 1981

=== Pachycormiformes ===
Genus	Species	Member	Abundance	Age	Notes	Images
Protosphyraena	P. bentonianum				A swordfish-like pachycormid	Protosphyraena perniciosa Bonnerichthys gladius
Protosphyraena	P. nitida	Smoky Hill Chalk		Late Coniacian	A swordfish-like pachycormid	Protosphyraena perniciosa Bonnerichthys gladius
Protosphyraena	P. perniciosa	Smoky Hill Chalk		Late Coniacian- Early Campanian?	A swordfish-like pachycormid	Protosphyraena perniciosa Bonnerichthys gladius
Protosphyraena	P. tenuis	Smoky Hill Chalk		Santonian- Early Campanian	A swordfish-like pachycormid	Protosphyraena perniciosa Bonnerichthys gladius
Protosphyraena	P. gladius	Smoky Hill Chalk			Named as a new genus, Bonnerichthys	Protosphyraena perniciosa Bonnerichthys gladius
Bonnerichthys	B. gladius	Smoky Hill Chalk		Late Coniacian- Early Campanian	A filter feeding pachycormid	Protosphyraena perniciosa Bonnerichthys gladius

=== Crossognathiformes ===
Genus	Species	Member	Abundance	Age	Notes	Images
Apsopelix	A. anglicus	Smoky Hill Chalk		Late Coniacian- Early Campanian	A crossognathid.	Pachyrhizodus sp.
Pachyrhizodus	P. caninus	Smoky Hill Chalk		Late Coniacian- Early Campanian	A pachyrhizodontid	Pachyrhizodus sp.
Pachyrhizodus	P. leptopsis	Smoky Hill Chalk		Late Coniacian- Santonian	A pachyrhizodontid	Pachyrhizodus sp.
Pachyrhizodus	P. minimus	Smoky Hill Chalk		Late Coniacian- Early Campanian	A pachyrhizodontid	Pachyrhizodus sp.

=== Ichthyodectiformes ===
Genus	Species	Member	Abundance	Age	Notes	Images
Xiphactinus	X. audax	Smoky Hill Chalk		Late Coniacian- Early Campanian	A large ichthyodectid	Xiphactinus audax Ichthyodectes ctenodon Gillicus arcuatus Saurodon leanus
Ichthyodectes	I. ctenodon	Smoky Hill Chalk		Late Coniacian- Early Campanian	An ichthyodectid	Xiphactinus audax Ichthyodectes ctenodon Gillicus arcuatus Saurodon leanus
Gillicus	G. arcuatus	Smoky Hill Chalk		Late Coniacian- Early Campanian	A saurodontid	Xiphactinus audax Ichthyodectes ctenodon Gillicus arcuatus Saurodon leanus
Saurodon	S. leanus	Smoky Hill Chalk		Late Coniacian- Santonian	A saurodontid	Xiphactinus audax Ichthyodectes ctenodon Gillicus arcuatus Saurodon leanus
Saurocephalus	S. lanciformis	Smoky Hill Chalk		Early Campanian	A saurodontid	Xiphactinus audax Ichthyodectes ctenodon Gillicus arcuatus Saurodon leanus
Prosaurodon	P. pygmaeus	Smoky Hill Chalk		Santonian		Xiphactinus audax Ichthyodectes ctenodon Gillicus arcuatus Saurodon leanus

=== Tselfatiiformes ===
Genus	Species	Member	Abundance	Age	Notes	Images
Thryptodus	T. zitteli	Smoky Hill Chalk		Late Coniacian	A plethodid	Pentanogmius evolutus
Pentanogmius	P. evolutus	Smoky Hill Chalk		Early Campanian	A plethodid	Pentanogmius evolutus
Martinichthys	M. brevis	Smoky Hill Chalk		Late Coniacian	A plethodid	Pentanogmius evolutus
Martinichthys	M. xiphoides	Smoky Hill Chalk		Late Coniacian	A plethodid	Pentanogmius evolutus
Niobrara	N. encarsia	Smoky Hill Chalk		Santonian	A plethodid	Pentanogmius evolutus
Zanclites	Z. xenurus	Smoky Hill Chalk		Santonian	A plethodid	Pentanogmius evolutus

=== Aulopiformes ===
Genus	Species	Member	Abundance	Age	Notes	Images
Cimolichthys	C. nepaholica	Smoky Hill Chalk		Late Coniacian- Early Campanian	A cimolichthyid	Cimolichthys nepaholica Enchodus petrosus
Enchodus	E. dirus	Smoky Hill Chalk		Late Coniacian- Santonian	An enchodontid	Cimolichthys nepaholica Enchodus petrosus
Enchodus	E. gladiolus	Smoky Hill Chalk		Late Coniacian- Early Campanian	An enchodontid	Cimolichthys nepaholica Enchodus petrosus
Enchodus	E. petrosus	Smoky Hill Chalk		Late Coniacian- Early Campanian	An enchodontid	Cimolichthys nepaholica Enchodus petrosus
Enchodus	E. shumardi	Smoky Hill Chalk		Late Coniacian- Early Campanian	An enchodontid	Cimolichthys nepaholica Enchodus petrosus
Apateodus	A. busseni	Smoky Hill Chalk		Early Campanian	An alepisauriform actinopterygiian related to the modern lancetfish and lizardfish	Cimolichthys nepaholica Enchodus petrosus
Apateodus	Indeterminate	Smoky Hill Chalk		Santonian		Cimolichthys nepaholica Enchodus petrosus
Stratodus	S. apicalis	Smoky Hill Chalk		Late Coniacian- Early Campanian	An alepisauriform actinopterygiian	Cimolichthys nepaholica Enchodus petrosus
Leptecodon	L. rectus			Early Campanian	An alepisauriform actinopterygiian	Cimolichthys nepaholica Enchodus petrosus

=== Beryciformes ===
Genus	Species	Member	Abundance	Age	Notes
Kansius	K. sternbergi	Smoky Hill Chalk		Early Campanian	A beryciform actinopterygiian
Trachichthyoides	Indeterminate	Smoky Hill Chalk		Santonian	A beryciform actinopterygiian
Caproberyx	Indeterminate	Smoky Hill Chalk		Santonian	A beryciform actinopterygiian

=== Other bony fish ===
Genus	Species	Member	Abundance	Age	Notes
Lepisosteus	Indeterminate	Smoky Hill Chalk		Late Coniacian	A lepisosteid gar
Paraliodesmus	P. guadagnii	Smoky Hill Chalk		Late Coniacian- Santonian	An amiiform
Urenchelys	U. abditus	Smoky Hill Chalk		Santonian	An anguilliform
Ferrifrons	F. rugosus				A ferrifronsid acanthomorph
Aethocephalichthys	A. hyainarhinos	Smoky Hill Chalk		Late Coniacian- Early Campanian	An actinopterygian of indeterminate classification
Omosoma	O. garretti				A polymixiid actinopterygiian closely related to the modern Beardfish
Belonostomus	Indeterminate				An aspidorhynchid

== Cartilaginous fish ==
=== Sharks ===
Genus	Species	State	Member	Abundance	Age	Notes	Images
Cretoxyrhina	C. mantelli		Smoky Hill Chalk		Late Coniacian- Early Campanian	A large lamniform shark	
Cretalamna	C. appendiculata		Smoky Hill Chalk		Late Coniacian- Early Campanian	A lamniform shark	Cretalamna appendiculata tooth from Israel
Cretolamna	C. appendiculata	N/A	N/A	N/A		An extremely widely used lapsus calami for Cretalamna.	
Johnlongia	Indeterminate		Smoky Hill Chalk		Late Coniacian	An odontaspidid lamniform shark	
Pseudocorax	P. laevis		Smoky Hill Chalk		Late Coniacian- Santonian	A lamniform shark smaller than Cretoxyrhina	
Squalicorax	S. falcatus		Smoky Hill Chalk		Late Coniacian- Santonian	A lamniform	Squalicorax falcatus tooth from Israel
Squalicorax	S. kaupi		Smoky Hill Chalk		Santonian- Early Campanian	A lamniform	Squalicorax kaupi tooth from Israel
Squalicorax	S. pristodontus		Smoky Hill Chalk		Early Campanian	A lamniform	
Squalicorax	S.microserratodon				Late Coniacian	A lamniform	
Scapanorhynchus	S. raphiodon		Smoky Hill Chalk		Late Coniacian	A mitsukurinid shark similar in appearance to the modern day goblin shark	Scapanorhynchus raphiodon
Ptychodus	P. anonymus		Smoky Hill Chalk			A ptychodontid lamniform shark	
Ptychodus	P. martini		Smoky Hill Chalk		Late Coniacian	A ptychodontid lamniform shark	
Ptychodus	P. mortoni		Smoky Hill Chalk		Late Coniacian- Santonian	A ptychodontid lamniform shark	
Ptychodus	P. occidentalis		Smoky Hill Chalk			A ptychodontid lamniform shark	
Ptychodus	P. polygyrus		Smoky Hill Chalk			A ptychodontid lamniform shark	

=== Other cartilaginous fish ===
Genus	Species	State	Member	Abundance	Age	Notes	Images
Edaphodon	E. laqueatus					A callorhinchid chimaeriform related to the modern ratfish	Rhinobatos fossil
Rhinobatos	R. incertus		Smoky Hill Chalk		Late Coniacian- Early Campanian		Rhinobatos fossil

== Reptiles ==
=== Dinosaurs ===
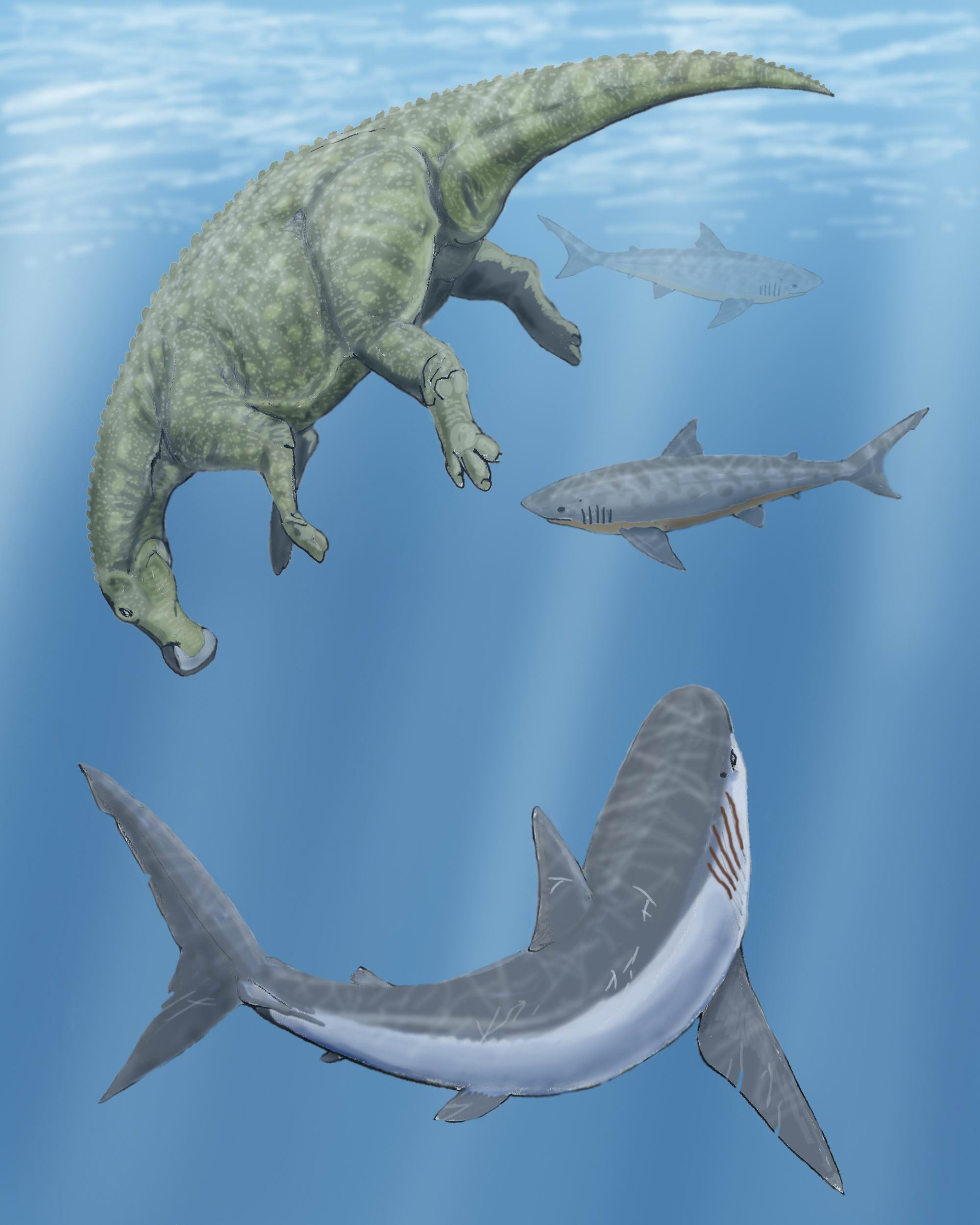
An artist's restoration of a dinosaur carcass that has been carried out to sea and some scavenging Squalicorax sharks.

Nonavian dinosaurs have been found in the Niobrara Chalk despite it being located hundreds of miles out to sea at the time. The most reasonable theory is that the carcasses drifted out to sea. It is unlikely that the bodies were carried out by outgoing tides along the shorelines where they died, but rather it is more probable that the dinosaurs were carried offshore by floodwaters during a storm. In the shallow waters the bodies would have begun to decompose and bacteria within the carcass would have produced gasses that would have accumulated in the gut, thereby making the body buoyant. Next, the prevailing winds and currents would have carried it out to sea, where it would eventually settle to the bottom and be buried in sediment.

A few caudal vertebrae from a hadrosaur have been found with bite marks and have been eroded, suggesting at one point they were digested. A single tooth belonging to Squalicorax was found in situ under the vertebrae. This suggested the shark consumed the posterior end of the tail of a floating hadrosaur carcass and had partially digested it before fossilization. Most dinosaurs in the chalk were nodosaurs. The dinosaurs found here were endemic to Appalachia.

=== Non-avian ===
Genus	Species	State	Member	Material	Age	Notes	Images
Claosaurus	C. agilis	Kansas	Smoky Hill Chalk	"Single articulated postcranial skeleton with associated skull fragments."	Early Campanian	A small hadrosaurid	Claosaurus agilis
Indeterminate hadrosaurid					Santonian	A hadrosaurid of indeterminate classification. Possibly Corythosaurus.	Claosaurus agilis
Niobrarasaurus	N. coleii	Kansas	Smoky Hill Chalk	"Partial skeleton."	Late Coniacian- Santonian	A nodosaurid ankylosaur.	Claosaurus agilis
Hierosaurus	H. sternbergi	Kansas	Smoky Hill Chalk	"Osteoderms."	Late Coniacian	A nodosaurid ankylosaur.	Claosaurus agilis

==== Birds ====
Three genre of birds are present in the formation, although rare. They were unrelated to modern birds, as they still retained teeth. Baptornis and Hesperornis were large flightless aquatic birds suited for diving. Ichthyornis was a seabird that resembled the gulls and petrels of today. Both probably preyed on small fish and were preyed upon by sharks, large bony fish such as Xiphactinus, and mosasaurs.

Genus	Species	State	Member	Material	Age	Notes	Images
Apatornis	A. celer	Kansas; Nebraska	Smoky Hill Chalk	"Postcranial elements."	Early Campanian		Hesperornis regalis Ichthyornis dispar
Baptornis	B. advenus		Smoky Hill Chalk	"Fragmentary skull [and] nearly complete postcranium."	Early Campanian	A baptornithid hesperornithiform	Hesperornis regalis Ichthyornis dispar
Guildavis	G. tener		Smoky Hill Chalk		Early Campanian		Hesperornis regalis Ichthyornis dispar
Hesperornis	H. crassipes	Kansas		"Partial postcranial skeleton."			Hesperornis regalis Ichthyornis dispar
Hesperornis	H. gracilis	Kansas		"Tarsometatarsus."			Hesperornis regalis Ichthyornis dispar
Hesperornis	H. regalis	Kansas	Smoky Hill Chalk		Early Campanian	A large hesperornithid hesperornithiform	Hesperornis regalis Ichthyornis dispar
Iaceornis	I. marshi		Smoky Hill Chalk		Early Campanian		Hesperornis regalis Ichthyornis dispar
Ichthyornis	I. agilis	Kansas				Junior synonym of I. dispar.	Hesperornis regalis Ichthyornis dispar
Ichthyornis	I. anceps	Kansas				Junior synonym of I. dispar.	Hesperornis regalis Ichthyornis dispar
Ichthyornis	I. dispar	Kansas	Smoky Hill Chalk		Late Coniacian- Early Campanian	An ichthyornithid	Hesperornis regalis Ichthyornis dispar
Ichthyornis	I. lentus	Kansas					Hesperornis regalis Ichthyornis dispar
Ichthyornis	I. tener	Kansas			Early Campanian		Hesperornis regalis Ichthyornis dispar
Ichthyornis	I. validus	Kansas				Junior synonym of I. dispar.	Hesperornis regalis Ichthyornis dispar
Ichthyornis	I. victor	Kansas				Junior synonym of I. dispar.	Hesperornis regalis Ichthyornis dispar
Parahesperornis	P. alexi	Kansas	Smoky Hill Chalk	"Partial skull [and] complete postcranium."	Early Campanian		Hesperornis regalis Ichthyornis dispar

=== Mosasaurs ===
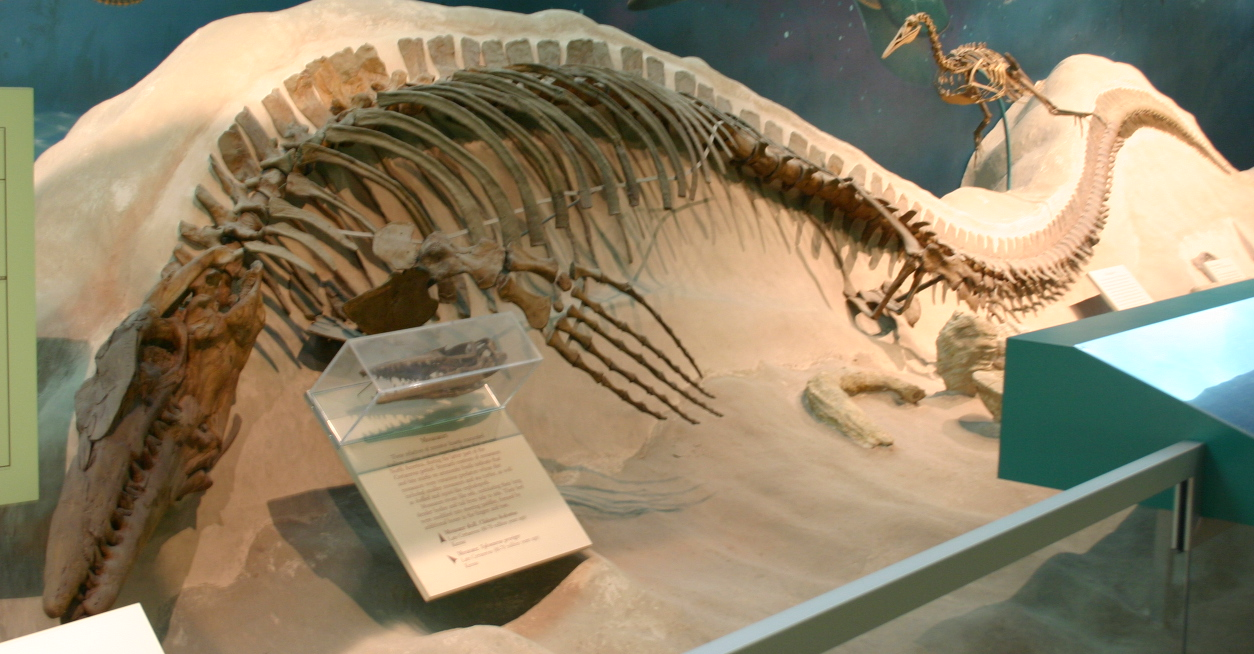
Tylosaurus proriger specimen which was found with a plesiosaur in its stomach

Mosasaurs are the most common marine reptiles in the Niobrara Chalk and the most successful ones in the sea at the time. Several different genera representing the four different subfamilies of Mosasauridae: the Tylosaurinae, Plioplatecarpinae, Mosasaurinae, and Halisaurinae, were present in Niobrara. They were the dominant carnivorous marine reptiles and ate cephalopods, fish, turtles, pterosaurs, birds, and even plesiosaurs. There is evidence of them consuming other smaller mosasaurs. Despite this, mosasaurs often fell prey to some of the large sharks at the time, such as Cretoxyrhina.

The presence of young mosasaurs in the formation suggests that mosasaurs were viviparous and gave birth hundreds of miles out to sea, as Niobrara was in the middle of the Western Interior Seaway at the time. Juveniles would likely have been vulnerable to predation by the many large mid-ocean predators present in the ecosystem.

Genus	Species	Member	Abundance	Age	Notes	Images
Clidastes	C. liodontus	Smoky Hill Chalk				
Clidastes	C. propython	Smoky Hill Chalk		Late Coniacian- Early Campanian		
Ectenosaurus	E. clidastoides	Smoky Hill Chalk		Santonian		
Ectenosaurus	E. everhartorum	Smoky Hill Chalk				
Ectenosaurus	E. tlemonectes	Smoky Hill Chalk		Late Coniacian?		
Eonatator	E. sternbergii	Smoky Hill Chalk		Early Campanian	A small halisaurine	
Platecarpus	P. tympaniticus	Smoky Hill Chalk			A plioplatecarpine	Tylosaurus nepaeolicus Anterolateral view of Platecarpus tympaniticus skull at the Peabody Museum of Natural History. Clidastes propython
Plesioplatecarpus	P. planifrons	Smoky Hill Chalk		Late Coniacian- Santonian		Tylosaurus nepaeolicus Anterolateral view of Platecarpus tympaniticus skull at the Peabody Museum of Natural History. Clidastes propython
Tylosaurus	T. nepaeolicus	Smoky Hill Chalk		Late Coniacian	A large tylosaurine.	Tylosaurus nepaeolicus Anterolateral view of Platecarpus tympaniticus skull at the Peabody Museum of Natural History. Clidastes propython
Tylosaurus	T. proriger	Smoky Hill Chalk		Santonian- Early Campanian	A large tylosaurine.	Tylosaurus nepaeolicus Anterolateral view of Platecarpus tympaniticus skull at the Peabody Museum of Natural History. Clidastes propython
Selmasaurus	S. johnsoni	Smoky Hill Chalk		Santonian		Tylosaurus nepaeolicus Anterolateral view of Platecarpus tympaniticus skull at the Peabody Museum of Natural History. Clidastes propython

=== Plesiosaurs ===
Plesiosaurs are present from two different families within Plesiosauroidea in the Niobrara Chalk: the Polycotylidae, or short-necked plesiosaurs, and the Elasmosauridae, or long-necked plesiosaurs. Polycotylids superficially resemble pliosaurs, which are not present within the formation, but are unrelated. They were fast swimmers, unlike the Elasmosaurs that used their long necks to catch fish. Plesiosaurs are rare in the formation and were therefore likely uncommon in the Western Interior Seaway at the time. Specimens become much more numerous in the Pierre Shale situated above the chalk.

Genus	Species	State	Member	Time span	Age	Notes	Images
Polycotylus	P. latipinnis		Smoky Hill Chalk	84.5-81.5 Ma ago	Early Campanian	A polycotylid.	Styxosaurus snowii Elasmosaurus platyurus
Dolichorhynchops	D. osborni		Smoky Hill Chalk	84.5-81.5 Ma ago	Early Campanian	A polycotylid. also present in the Pierre Shale Formation	Styxosaurus snowii Elasmosaurus platyurus
Brimosaurus	B. grandis	Kansas	Fort Hays Limestone			A nomen dubium.	Styxosaurus snowii Elasmosaurus platyurus
Styxosaurus	S. snowii		Smoky Hill Chalk	85-81.5 Ma ago	Santonian?- Early Campanian	A large elasmosaurid, also present in the Pierre Shale Formation	Styxosaurus snowii Elasmosaurus platyurus
Elasmosaurus	"E." sternbergi		Smoky Hill Chalk	84.5-81.5 Ma ago	Early Campanian	Most likely not referable to Elasmosaurus.	Styxosaurus snowii Elasmosaurus platyurus

=== Pterosaurs ===
Two genera of pterosaurs are present in the formation, both within Pterodactyloidea: the pteranodontid Pteranodon (sometimes broken into several genera like Geosternbergia and Dawndraco, though this is dubious) and the nyctosaurid Nyctosaurus. They are large pterosaurs with elongated cranial crests. The pterosaurs of Niobrara probably spent most of their time at sea and rarely went on land, with Nyctosaurus being a probably fully pelagic animal. Pteranodon probably foraged on the ocean surface, while Nyctosaurus was a frigatebird-like aerial predator.

Genus	Species	Member	Time span	Age	Notes	Images
Nyctosaurus	N. gracilis	Smoky Hill Chalk	85–84.5 Ma	Santonian- Early Campanian	A nyctosaurid ornithocheiroid	Nyctosaurus sp.
Pteranodon	P. longiceps	Smoky Hill Chalk	86–84.5 Ma	Santonian- Early Campanian	A large and very abundant pteranodontid ornithocheiroid	
Pteranodon	P. sternbergi	Smoky Hill Chalk	86–84.5 Ma	Late Coniacian	Considered to be a distinct genus Geosternbergia by a few paleontologists, although most regard it as a species of Pteranodon	

=== Turtles ===
Sea turtles have been found from the Niobrara Chalk that reached large sizes. The biggest, Archelon, was considerably larger than its distant relative, the leatherback sea turtle, which is the largest of the sea turtles alive today. The sea turtles most likely fed on ammonites, squid, and other cephalopods.

Genus	Species	Member	Abundance	Age	Notes	Images
Bothremys	B. barberi	Smoky Hill Chalk		Early Campanian		Protostega gigas
Chelosphargis	C. advena	Smoky Hill Chalk		Late Coniacian	archelon-a giant sea turtle	Protostega gigas
Ctenochelys	C. stenopora	Smoky Hill Chalk		Santonian		Protostega gigas
Kansastega	K. copei				A protostegid cryptodire formerly a synonym of Protostega gigas	Protostega gigas
Porthochelys	P. laticeps	Smoky Hill Chalk		Late Coniacian	A toxichelid cryptodire	Protostega gigas
Protostega	P. gigas	Smoky Hill Chalk		Early Campanian	A protostegid cryptodire	Protostega gigas
Toxochelys	T. latiremis	Smoky Hill Chalk		Late Coniacian- Early Campanian	A chelonioid cryptodire	Protostega gigas

== Invertebrates ==
Clams, oysters, crinoids, ammonites, and squid are all common in the Niobrara Chalk and must have constituted the majority of life at the time. Evidence of sponges, annelid worms, and crustaceans are less common and are usually found as trace fossils.

=== Bivalves ===
Genus	Species	Member	Abundance	Age	Notes	Images
Cladoceramus	C. undulatoplicatus	Smoky Hill Chalk		Santonian		Volviceramus, Durania, and Pseudoperna.
Durania	D. maxima	Smoky Hill Chalk		Late Coniacian, Early Campanian		Volviceramus, Durania, and Pseudoperna.
Haploscapha		Fort Hays Limestone				Volviceramus, Durania, and Pseudoperna.
Inoceramus		Fort Hays Limestone				Volviceramus, Durania, and Pseudoperna.
Ostrea		Fort Hays Limestone				Volviceramus, Durania, and Pseudoperna.
Platyceramus	P. platinus	Smoky Hill Chalk		Late Coniacian- Early Campanian		Volviceramus, Durania, and Pseudoperna.
Pseudoperna	P. congesta	Smoky Hill Chalk		Late Coniacian- Early Campanian		Volviceramus, Durania, and Pseudoperna.
Volviceramus	V. grandis	Smoky Hill Chalk		Late Coniacian		Volviceramus, Durania, and Pseudoperna.

=== Cephalopods ===
Genus	Species	Member	Abundance	Notes	Images
Baculites	B.sp	Smoky Hill Chalk		Santonian- Early Campanian	Baculites Enchoteuthis
Clioscaphites	C.vermiformis	Smoky Hill Chalk		Santonian	Baculites Enchoteuthis
Clioscaphites	C. choteauensis	Smoky Hill Chalk		Santonian	Baculites Enchoteuthis
Rugaptychus	R.sp	Smoky Hill Chalk		Early Campanian	Baculites Enchoteuthis
Spinaptychus	S. sternbergi	Smoky Hill Chalk		Santonian	Baculites Enchoteuthis
Tusoteuthis	T. longa	Smoky Hill Chalk		A nomen dubium.	Baculites Enchoteuthis
Enchoteuthis	E. melanae	Smoky Hill Chalk		Most material formerly referred to Tusoteuthis now belongs to this taxon.	Baculites Enchoteuthis
Enchoteuthis	E. cobbani	Smoky Hill Chalk			Baculites Enchoteuthis
Niobrarateuthis	N. bonneri	Smoky Hill Chalk			Baculites Enchoteuthis

=== Echinoderms ===
Genus	Species	State	Member	Age	Abundance	Notes	Images
"Unitacrinus"	"U. socialis"	N/A	N/A		N/A	Common lapsus calami of Uintacrinus	
Uintacrinus	U. socialis			Santonian			Uintacrinus
