= List of the Mesozoic life of Kansas =

This list of the Mesozoic life of Kansas contains the various prehistoric life-forms whose fossilized remains have been reported from within the US state of Kansas and are between 252.17 and 66 million years of age.

== A ==
- †Abietites
  - †Abietites ernestinae
  - †Abietites longifolius
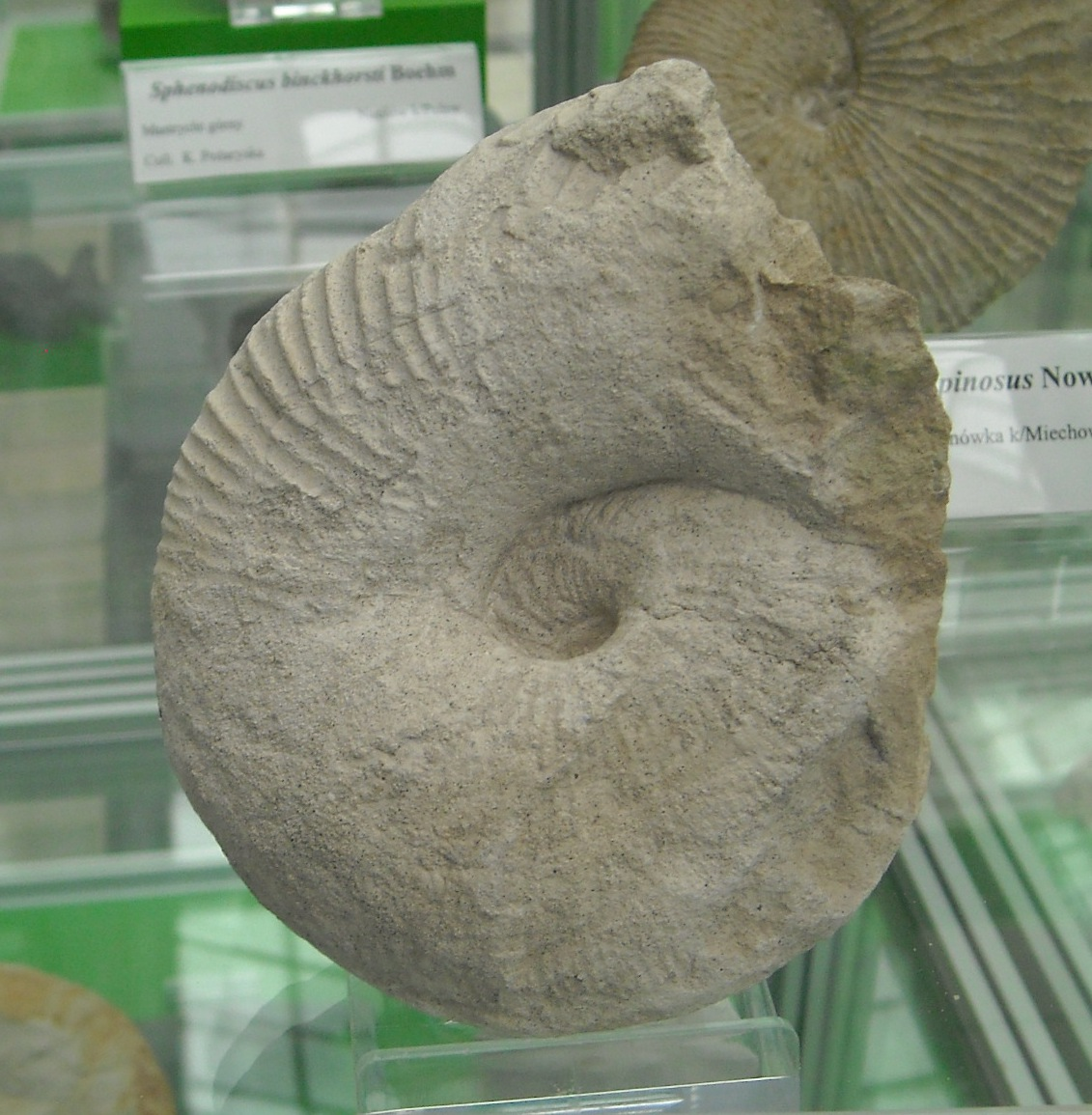
- Fossilized shell of the Late Cretaceous ammonoid cephalopod Acanthoscaphites
  †Acanthoscaphites – tentative report
  - †Acanthoscaphites reesidei
- †Alzadasaurus – type locality for genus
  - †Alzadasaurus kansasensis – type locality for species
- †Amberleya
- †Ampullina
- †Anomia
- †Apateodus
  - †Apateodus busseni – type locality for species
- †Apatornis
  - †Apatornis celer – type locality for species
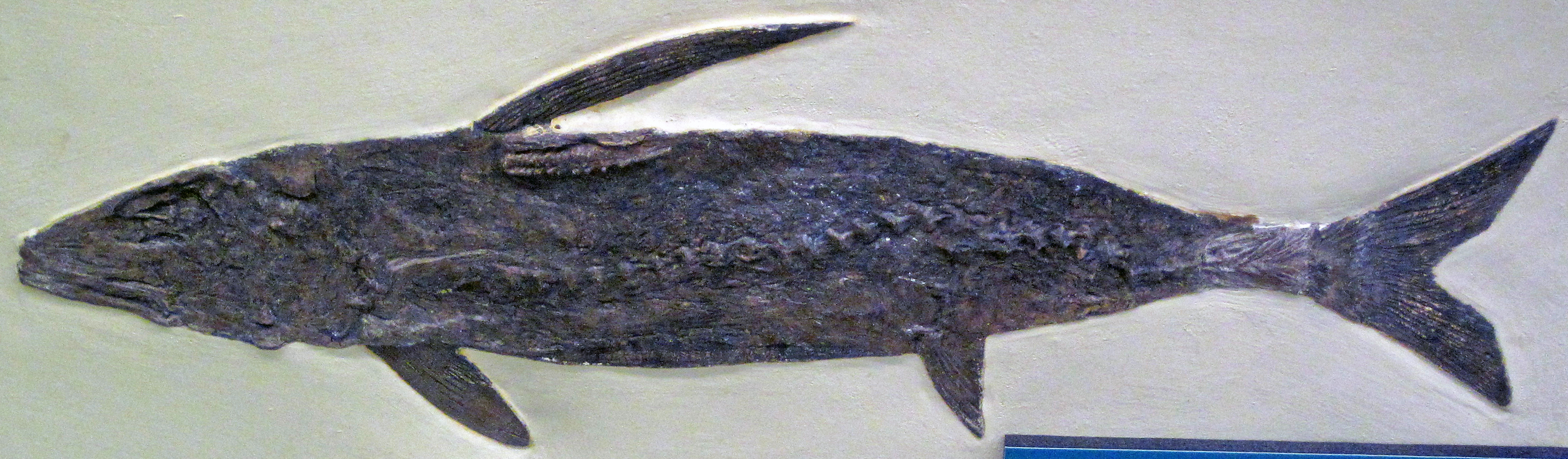
- Fossilized skeleton of the Late Cretaceous bony fish Apsopelix
  †Apsopelix
  - †Apsopelix anglicus
- †Aquatifolia
  - †Aquatifolia fluitans
- Aralia
  - †Aralia newberryi
  - †Aralia polymorpha
  - †Aralia ravniana
- †Araliopsoides
  - †Araliopsoides cretacea
- †Arcellites
  - †Arcellites disciformis
- †Archaeanthus – type locality for genus
  - †Archaeanthus linnenbergeri – type locality for species
- †Archaeolamna
  - †Archaeolamna kopingensis
- †Archaepetala – type locality for genus
  - †Archaepetala beekeri – type locality for species
  - †Archaepetala obscura – type locality for species
- †Arcopagella
  - †Arcopagella mactroides
- †Ariadnaesporites
  - †Ariadnaesporites ariadnae
- Arundo
  - †Arundo groenlandica
- †Asplenium
  - †Asplenium dicksonianum
- †Astrocoenia
  - †Astrocoenia nidiformis
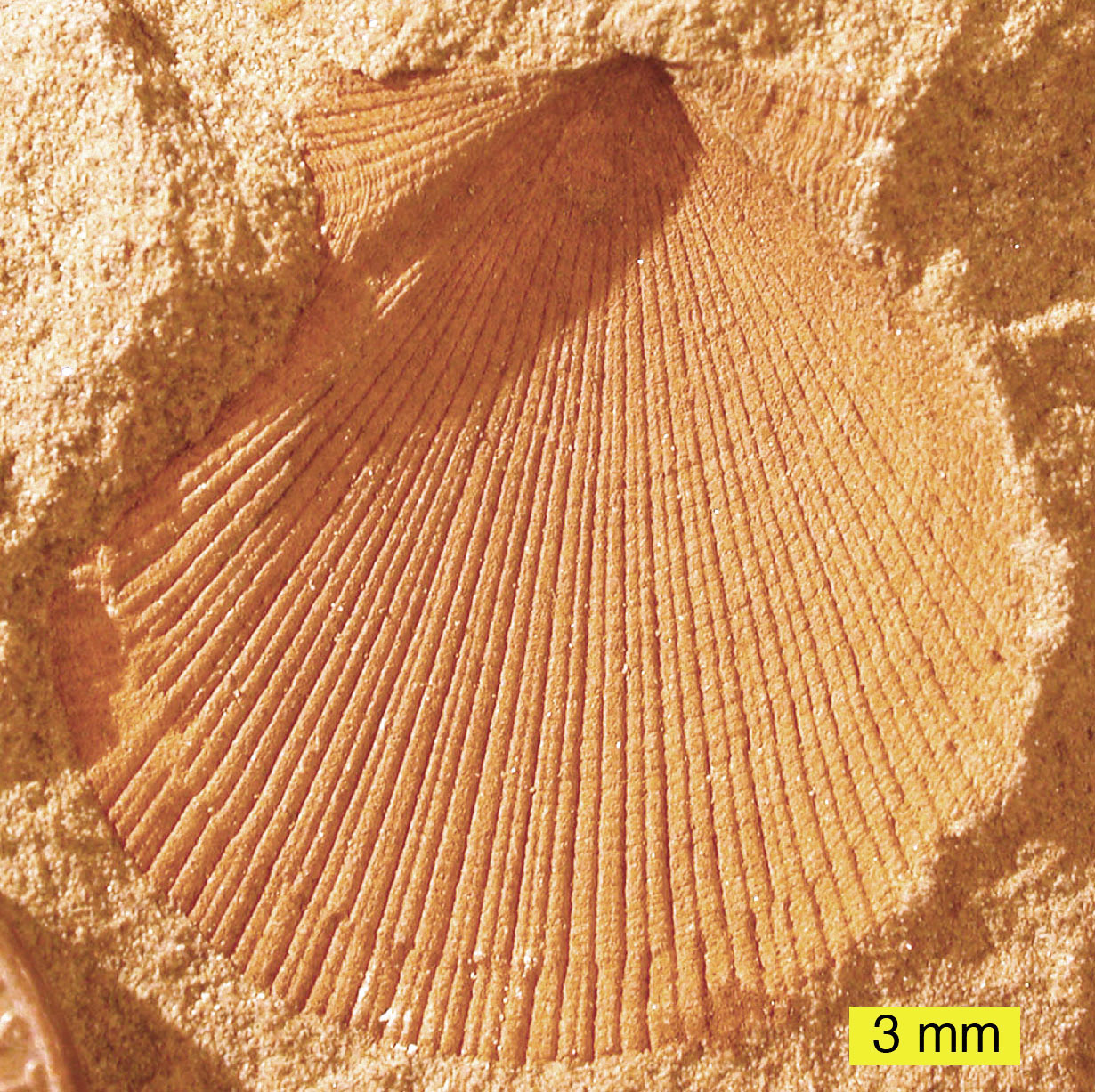
- Mold fossil of a shell of the Early Devonian-Late Triassic bivalve Aviculopecten
  †Aviculopecten
  - †Aviculopecten occidentalis

== B ==
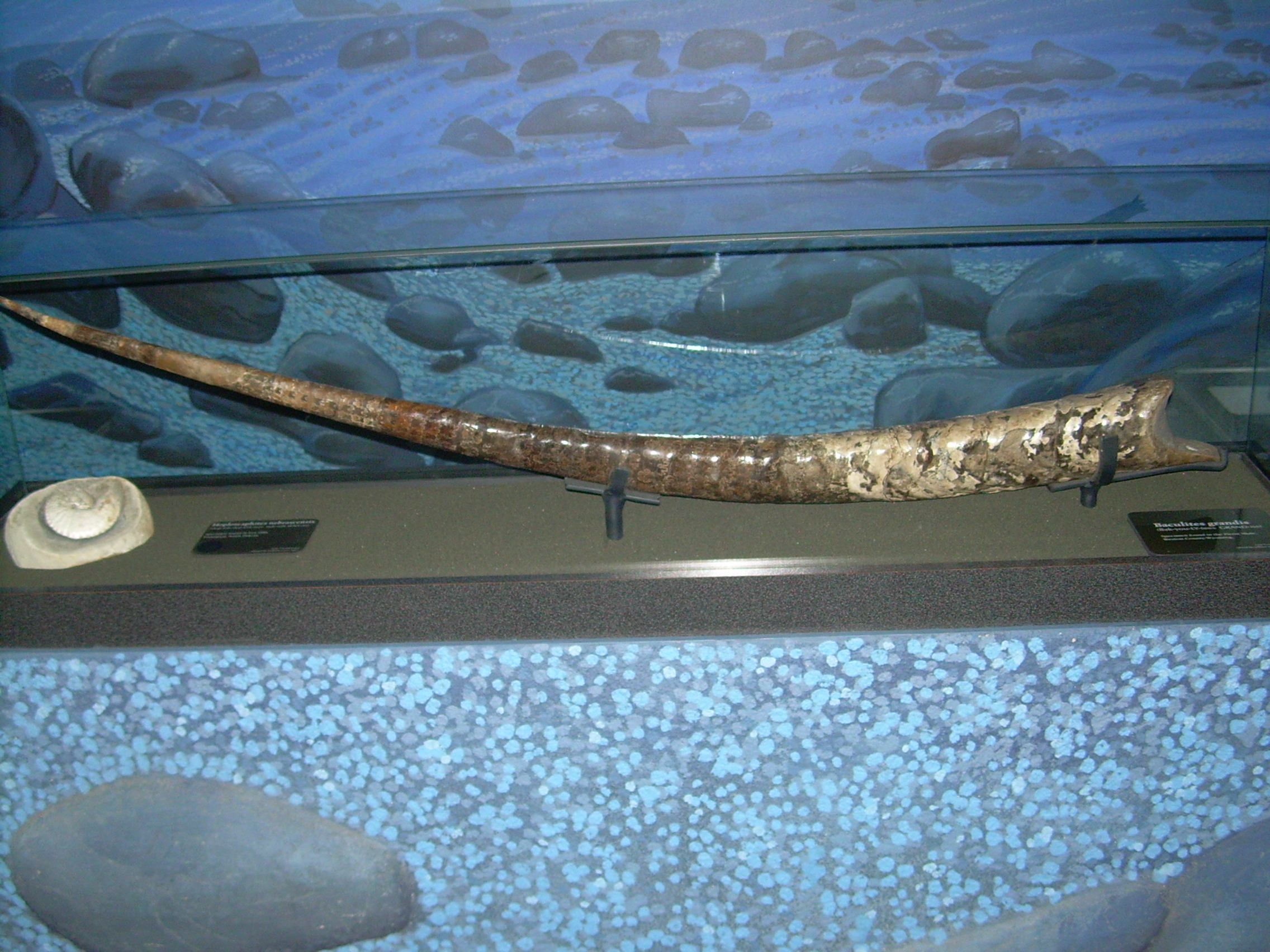
- Fossilized shell of the Late Cretaceous ammonoid cephalopod Baculites
  †Baculites
  - †Baculites clinolobatus
  - †Baculites compressus
  - †Baculites grandis
  - †Baculites ovatus
  - †Baculites pseudovatus – type locality for species
- †Bacutriletes
  - †Bacutriletes greenlandicus
- †Bananogmius
  - †Bananogmius evolutus
- †Baptornis – type locality for genus
  - †Baptornis advenus – type locality for species
- †Bassites – type locality for genus
  - †Bassites reesidei – type locality for species
- Botula
  - †Botula carolinensis
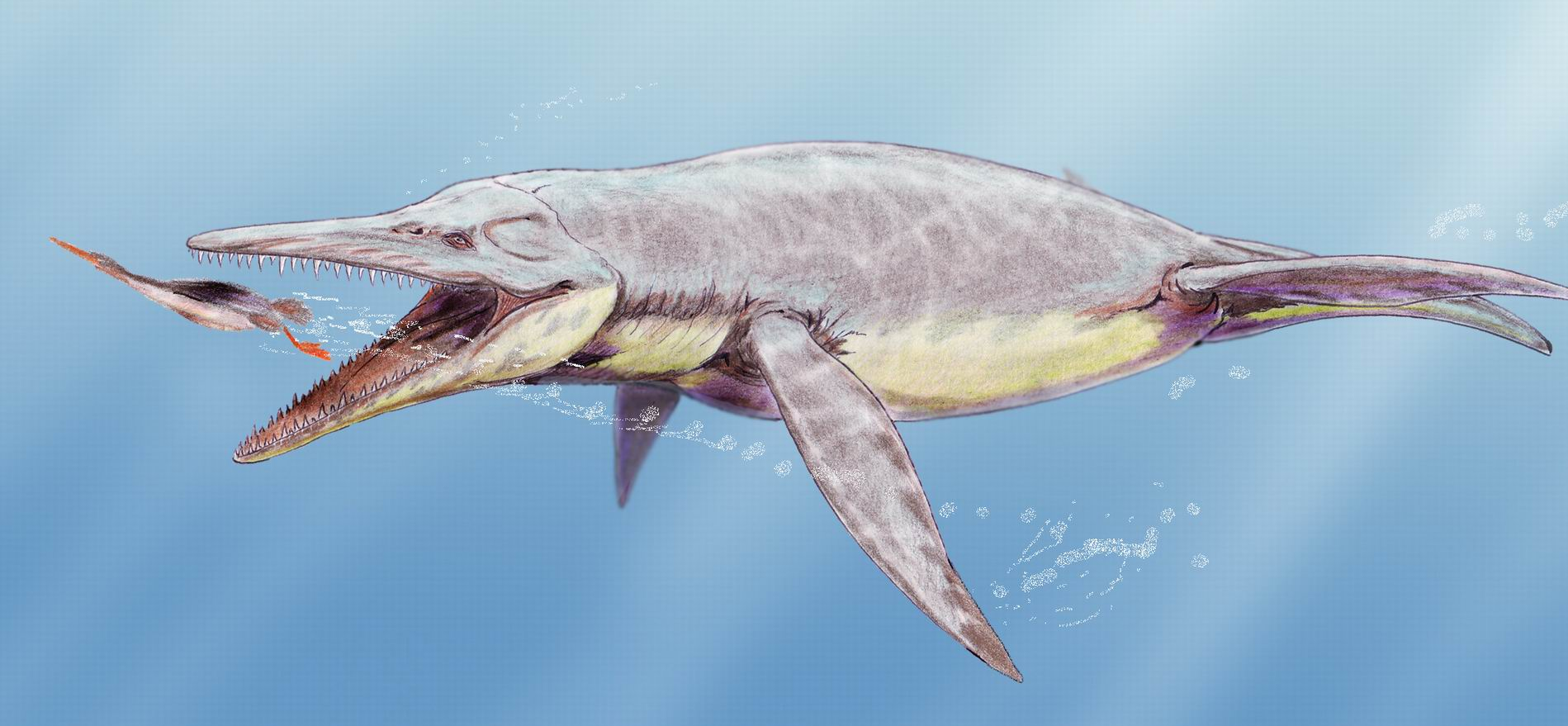
- Life restoration of the Late Cretaceous plesiosaur Brachauchenius hunting a hesperornithiform bird
  †Brachauchenius – type locality for genus
  - †Brachauchenius lucasi – type locality for species
- Brachidontes
  - †Brachidontes nonbifurcus
- †Brachyrhizodus
  - †Brachyrhizodus mcnultyi
- †Brasenites
  - †Brasenites kansense
- †Breviarca
  - †Breviarca angulata
  - †Breviarca habita
  - †Breviarca salinaensis
  - †Breviarca subovata

== C ==
- Cadulus
  - †Cadulus praetenuis
- †Caloda – type locality for genus
  - †Caloda delevoryana – type locality for species
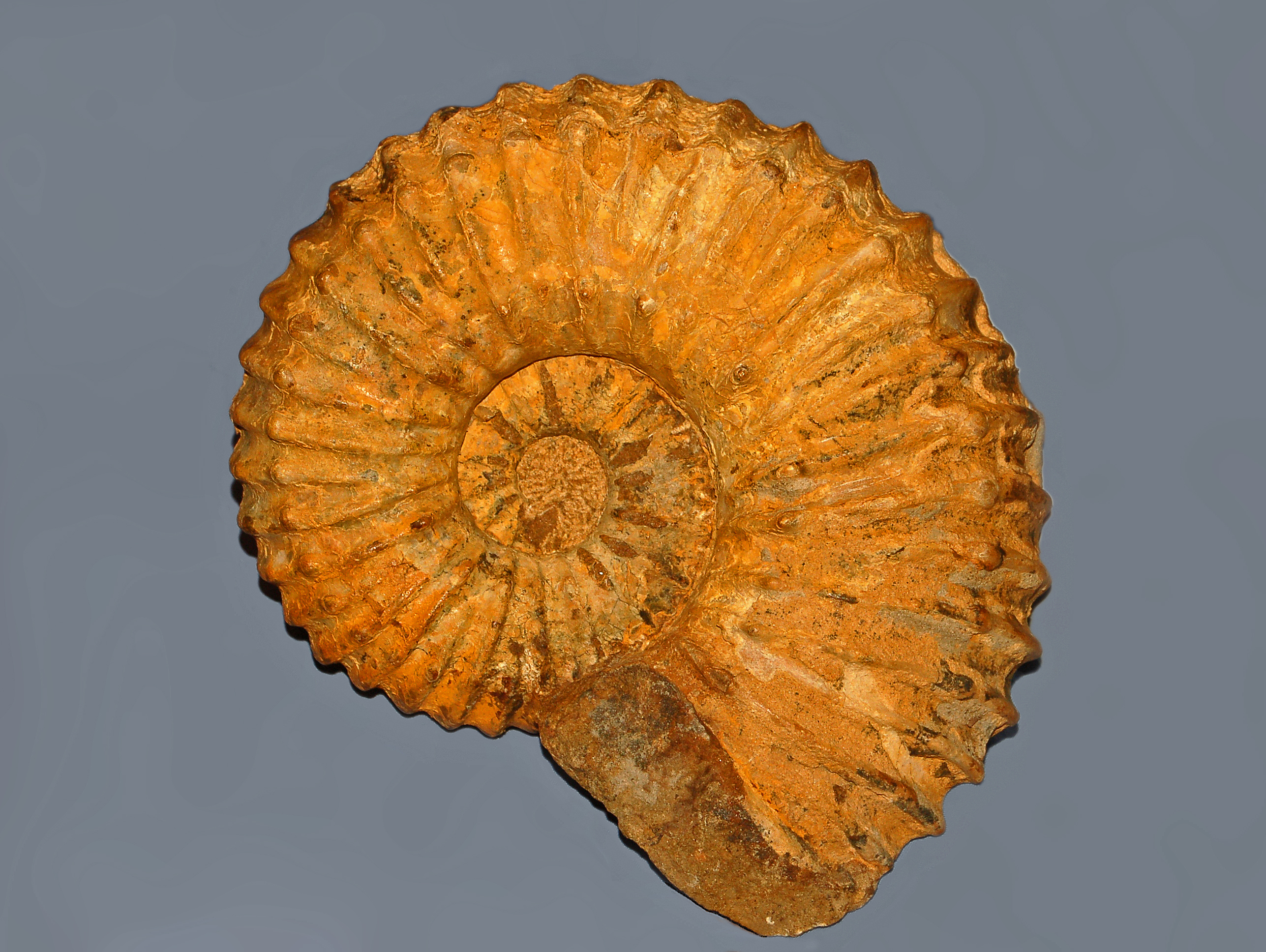
- Fossilized shell of the Late Cretaceous ammonoid cephalopod Calycoceras
  †Calycoceras
  - †Calycoceras naviculare
- †Cantioscyllium
  - †Cantioscyllium decipiens
- Carcharias
  - †Carcharias amonensis
  - †Carcharias saskatchewanensis
  - †Carcharias tenuiplicatus
- Cardita
  - †Cardita belviderensis
- †Carpolithus
  - †Carpolithus belviderensis
- †Cassiope
- †Ceratophyllum
- Chiloscyllium
  - †Chiloscyllium greeni
- †Chondrites
- †Cimolichthys
  - †Cimolichthys nepaholica
- Cladophlebis
  - †Cladophlebis dakotensis
- †Claosaurus
  - †Claosaurus agilis – type locality for species
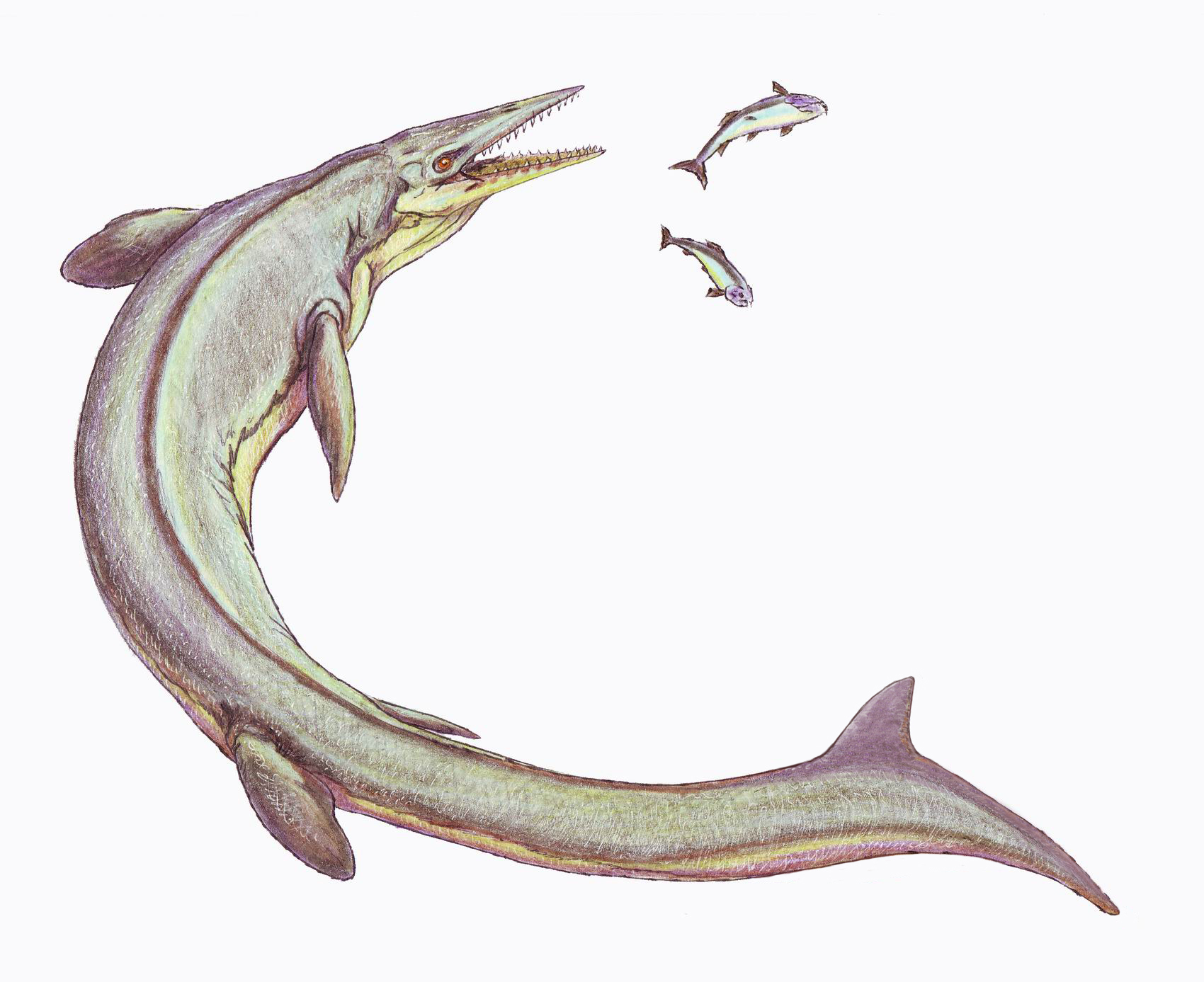
- Life restoration of the Late Cretaceous mosasaurid Clidastes
  †Clidastes
  - †Clidastes liodontus
  - †Clidastes velox
- Cliona
- †Clioscaphites
  - †Clioscaphites choteauensis
- †Collignoniceras
  - †Collignoniceras woollgari
- †Coniasaurus
  - †Coniasaurus crassidens – or unidentified comparable form
- Corbula
  - †Corbula fenti
  - †Corbula smolanensis
- †Costatheca
  - †Costatheca diskoensis
  - †Costatheca lata
- †Crassatellina
  - †Crassatellina oblonga
- Crassinella
  - †Crassinella semicostata
- Crassostrea
  - †Crassostrea kiowana
- †Cretolamna
  - †Cretolamna appendiculata
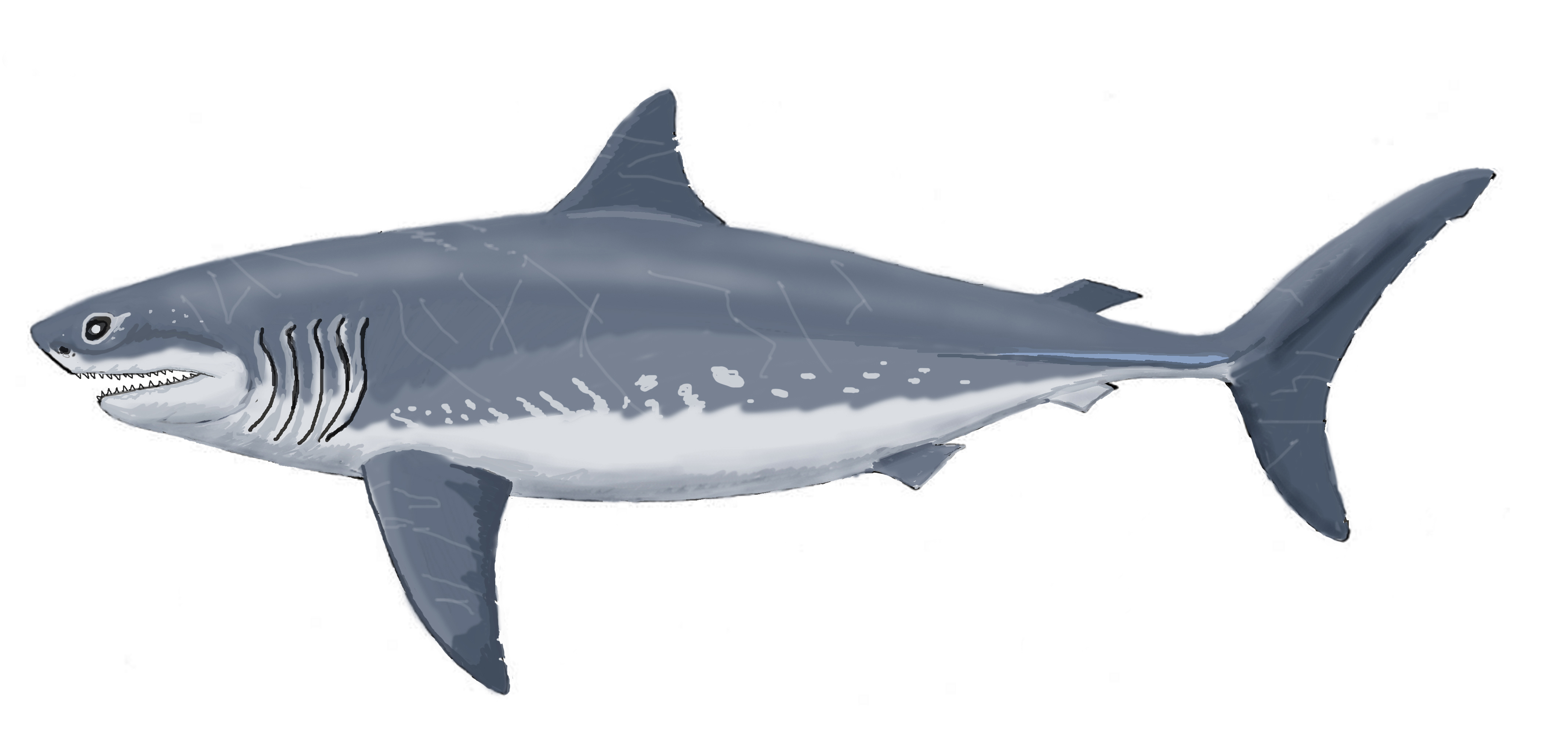
- Restoration of the Late Cretaceous shark Cretoxyrhina, or the Ginsu shark
  †Cretoxyrhina
  - †Cretoxyrhina mantelli
- †Crossopodia
- Ctenochelys
  - †Ctenochelys procax
  - †Ctenochelys stenoporus – type locality for species
- Cucullaea
  - †Cucullaea herculea
  - †Cucullaea recedens
- †Cupressinoxylon
  - †Cupressinoxylon cheyennense
- †Cycadeoidea
  - †Cycadeoidea munita
- †Cycadeospermum
  - †Cycadeospermum lineatum
- †Cyprimeria
  - †Cyprimeria kiowana
- Cytheridea

== D ==
- †Dakotasuchus – type locality for genus
  - †Dakotasuchus kingi – type locality for species
- †Dawndraco – type locality for genus
  - †Dawndraco kanzai – type locality for species
- †Desmatochelys
  - †Desmatochelys lowi
- †Dictyothylakos
- †Discoscaphites
  - †Discoscaphites constrictus
  - †Discoscaphites nicoletti
- †Dolichorhynchops – type locality for genus
  - †Dolichorhynchops osborni – type locality for species
- †Donlesia
  - †Donlesia dakotensis
- †Drepanocheilus
  - †Drepanocheilus kiowanus
- †Durania
  - †Durania maxima

== E ==
- †Ectenosaurus
  - †Ectenosaurus clidastoides
- †Eiffellithus
  - †Eiffellithus turriseiffelii
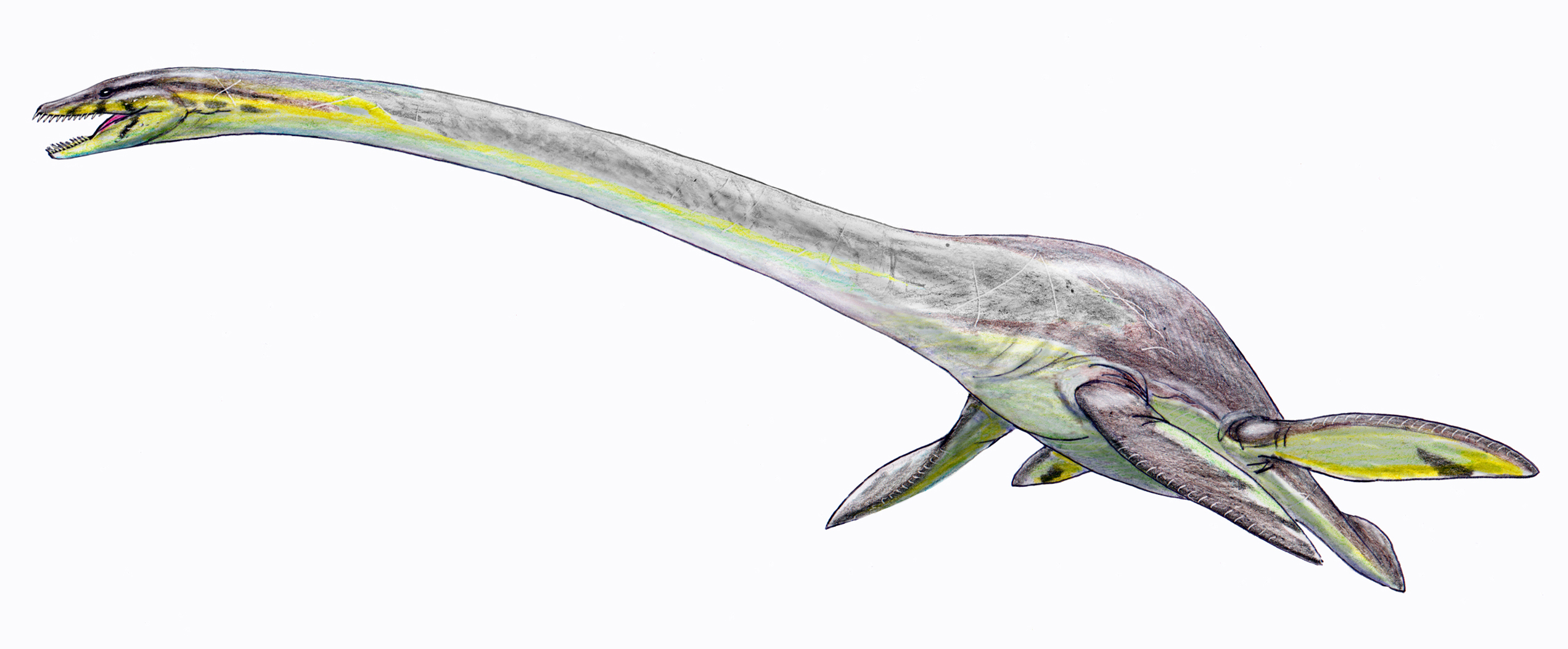
- Life restoration of the Late Cretaceous plesiosaur Elasmosaurus with an anachronistic human to scale
  †Elasmosaurus – type locality for genus
  - †Elasmosaurus nobilis – type locality for species
  - †Elasmosaurus platyurus – type locality for species
  - †Elasmosaurus sternbergi – type locality for species
- †Enchodus
  - †Enchodus gladiolus
  - †Enchodus petrosus
- †Engonoceras
  - †Engonoceras belviderense
- †Eprolithus
  - †Eprolithus floralis
- †Erlansonisporites
  - †Erlansonisporites erlansonii
- †Euspira
  - †Euspira smolanensis

== F ==
- †Fagus
- †Feistmantelia
  - †Feistmantelia oblonga
- †Flaventia
  - †Flaventia belviderensis
- †Fumicollis – type locality for genus
  - †Fumicollis hoffmani – type locality for species

== G ==
- †Gegania
- †Gervillia
  - †Gervillia mudgeana
  - †Gervillia mudgenana
- †Gillicus
  - †Gillicus arcuatus
- Gleichenia
  - †Gleichenia bohemica
  - †Gleichenia nordenskioldi
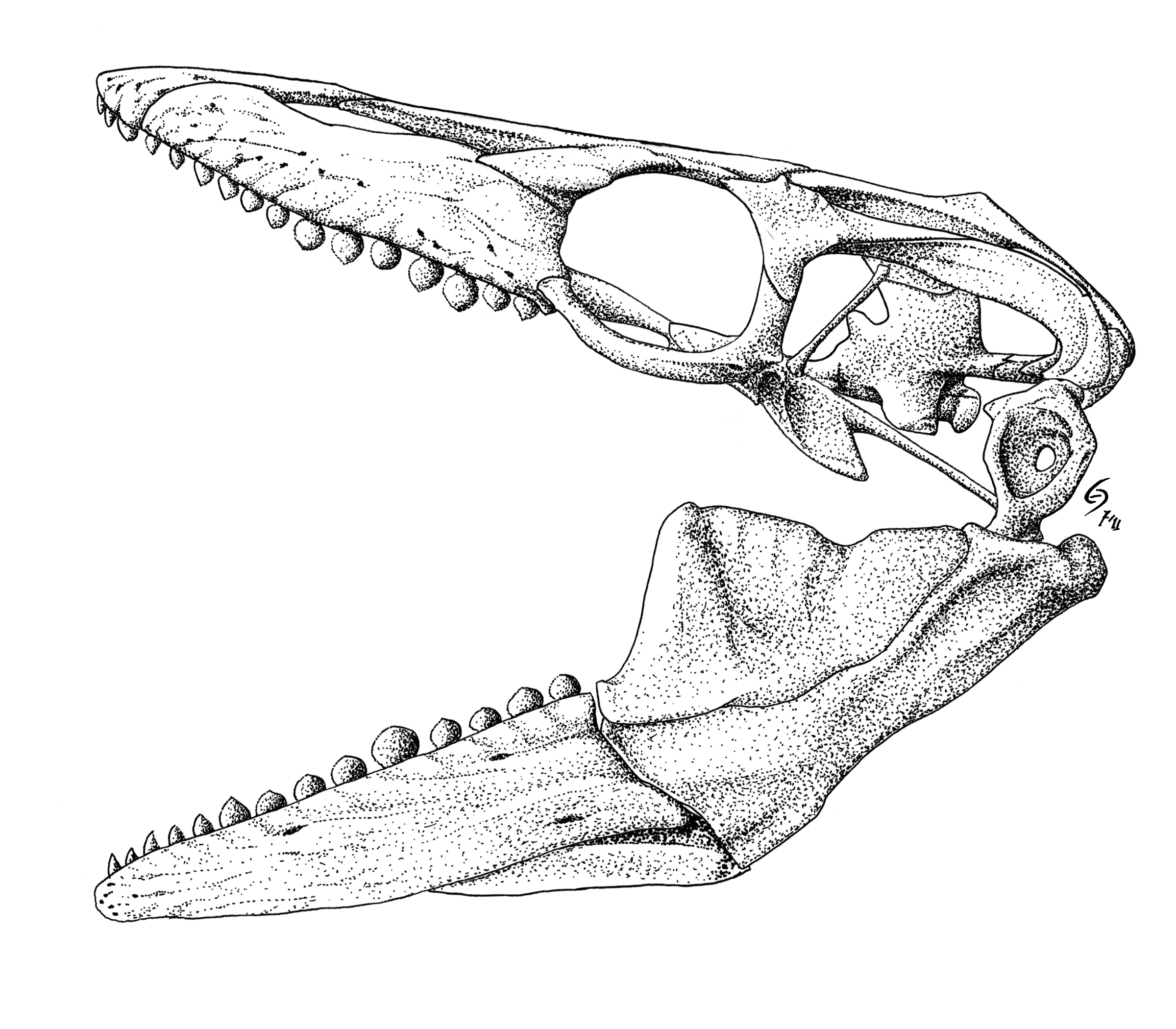
- Illustration of a reconstructed skull of the Late Cretaceous mosasaur Globidens
  †Globidens
- †Gryphaea
  - †Gryphaea corrugata
  - †Gryphaea hilli
  - †Gryphaea mucronata
  - †Gryphaea navia

== H ==
- †Hadrodus
  - †Hadrodus priscus
- †Halisaurus
  - †Halisaurus sternbergi – type locality for species
- †Heliocolithus
  - †Heliocolithus trabeculatus
- †Henrisporites
  - †Henrisporites angustus
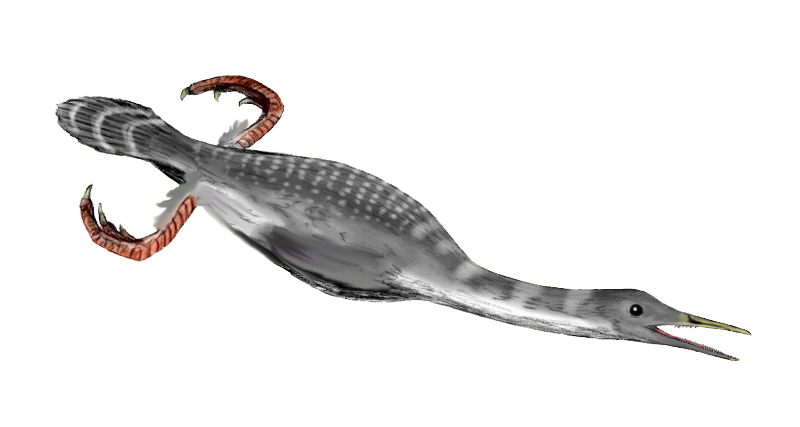
- Life restoration of the Late Cretaceous toothed bird Hesperornis
  †Hesperornis – type locality for genus
  - †Hesperornis crassipes – type locality for species
  - †Hesperornis gracilis – type locality for species
  - †Hesperornis regalis – type locality for species
- †Heteroceras
  - †Heteroceras tortum
- †Hierosaurus – type locality for genus
  - †Hierosaurus sternbergii – type locality for species
- †Homomya
- †Hoploscaphites
  - †Hoploscaphites nicolletii
- †Hughesisporites
- †Huhatanka
  - †Huhatanka kiowana

== I ==
- †Iaceornis
  - †Iaceornis marshi – type locality for species
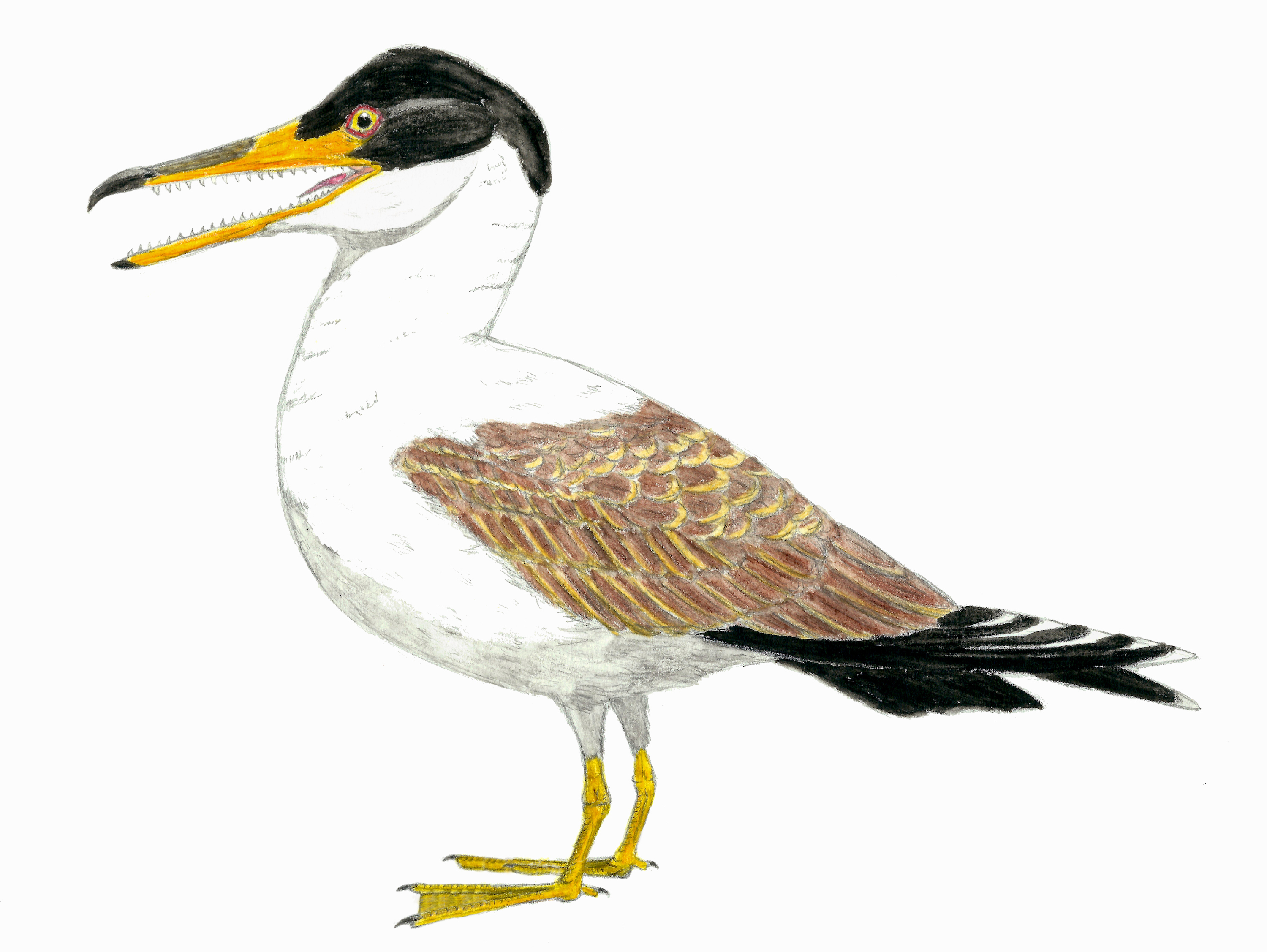
- Restoration of the Late Cretaceous toothed bird Ichthyornis
  †Ichthyornis – type locality for genus
  - †Ichthyornis dispar – type locality for species
- †Inoceramus
  - †Inoceramus cuvieri
  - †Inoceramus ginterensis
  - †Inoceramus tenuistriatus – tentative report
- †Ischyrhiza
  - †Ischyrhiza mira

== J ==
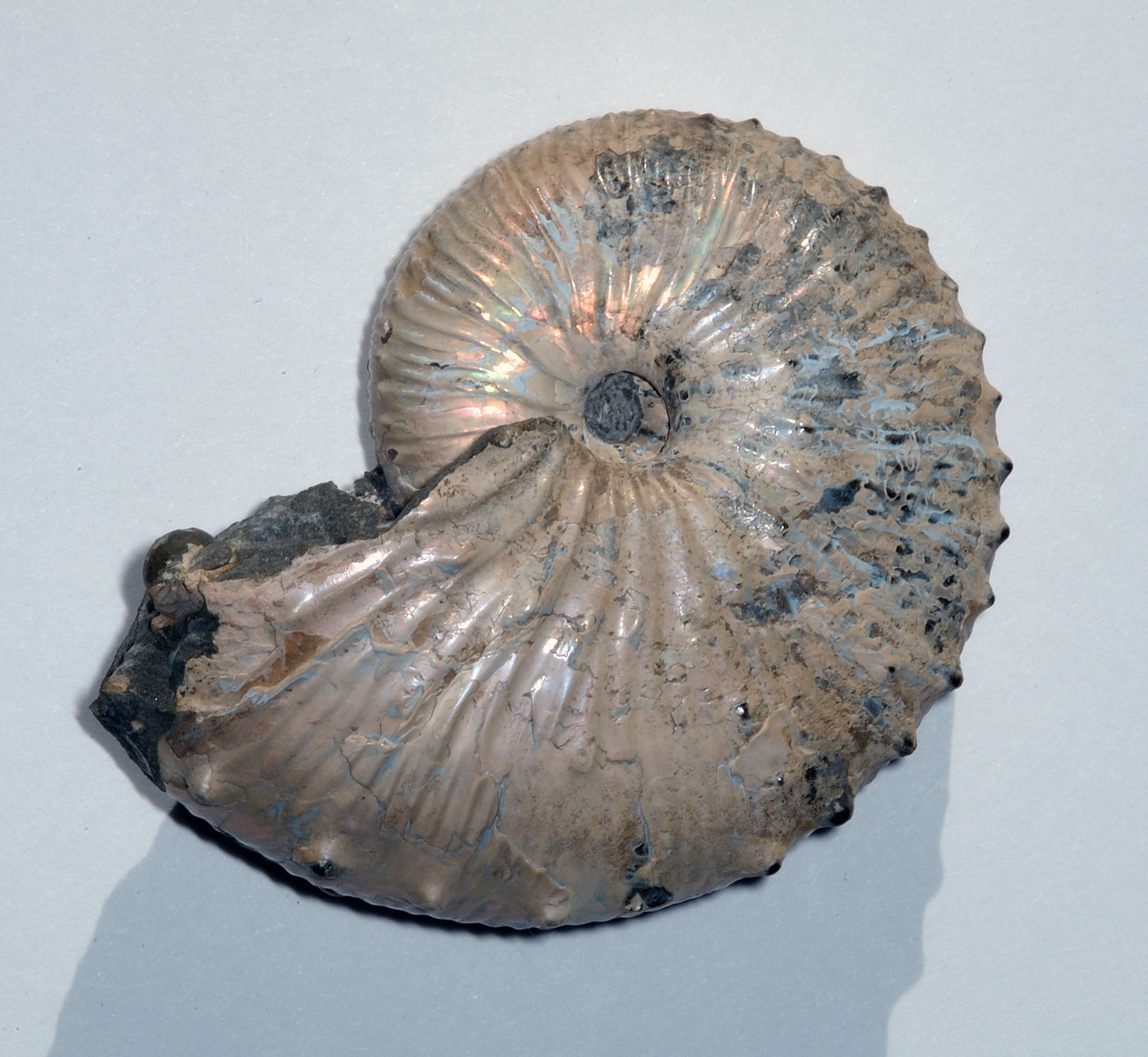
- Fossilized shell of the Late Cretaceous ammonoid cephalopod Jeletzkytes
  †Jeletzkytes
  - †Jeletzkytes nodosus

== K ==
- †Kalymmanthus – type locality for genus
  - †Kalymmanthus walkeri – type locality for species

== L ==
- †Laminospondylus
  - †Laminospondylus transversus – or unidentified comparable form
- †Leiosphaeridia
- †Leptosolen
  - †Leptosolen otterensis
- †Leptostyrax
  - †Leptostyrax crassidens
- †Lesqueria
  - †Lesqueria elocata
- †Linearis
  - †Linearis kansasensis
- †Lingula
  - †Lingula subspatula
  - †Lingula subspatulata
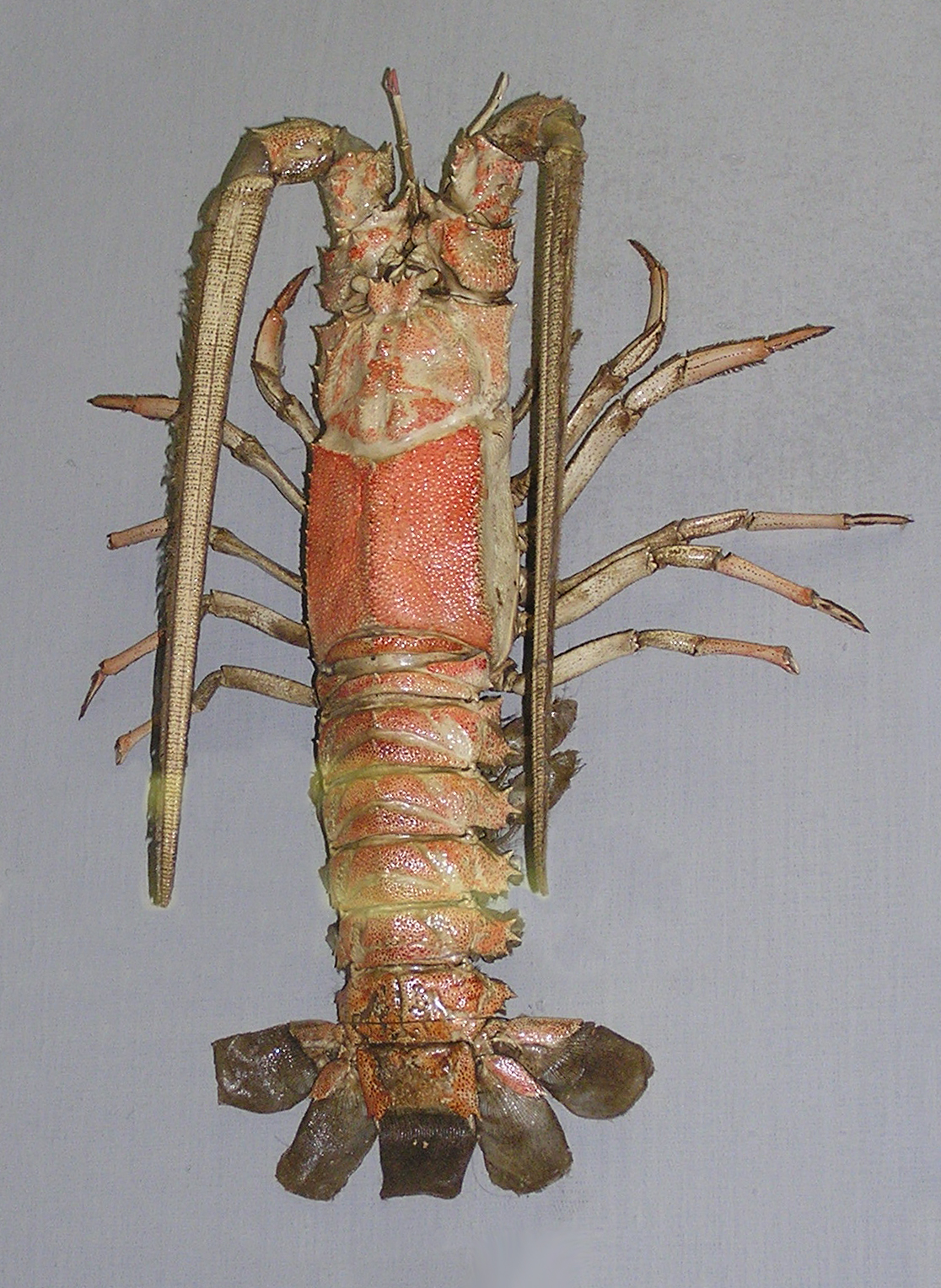
- A modern Linuparus spiny lobster
  Linuparus
  - †Linuparus canadensis
- †Liriophyllum
  - †Liriophyllum kansense – type locality for species
- Lopha
  - †Lopha kansasensis
  - †Lopha subovata
- †Lophochelys – type locality for genus
  - †Lophochelys natatrix – type locality for species
  - †Lophochelys niobrarae – type locality for species

== M ==
- †Maexisporites
  - †Maexisporites soldanellus
- †Magnoavipes
- Marsilea
  - †Marsilea johnhallii
- †Mathilda
- †Megacephalosaurus – type locality for genus
  - †Megacephalosaurus eulerti – type locality for species
- Membranipora
- †Microcarpolithes
  - †Microcarpolithes hexagonalis
- †Minerisporites
  - †Minerisporites dissimilis
  - †Minerisporites marginatus
  - †Minerisporites pterotus – or unidentified comparable form
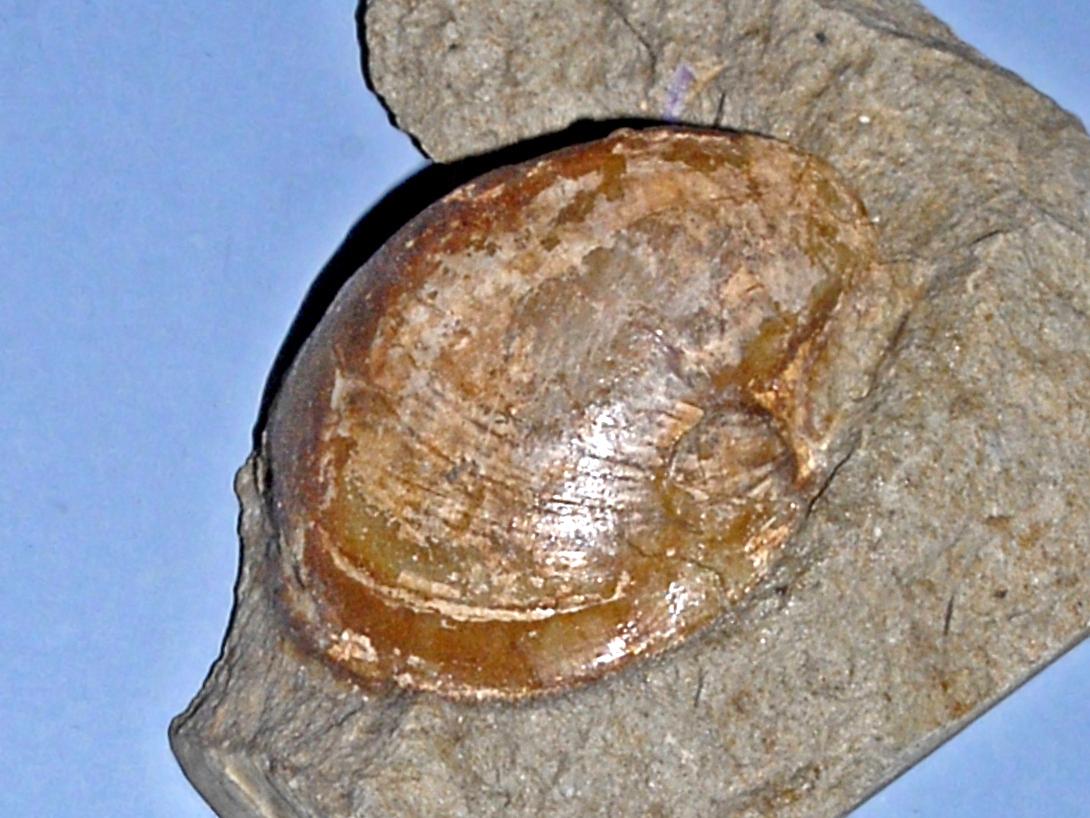
- Fossilized shell of the Devonian-modern marine bivalve Modiolus, or horsemussel
  †Modiolus
- †Molaspora
  - †Molaspora lobata
  - †Molaspora salinum – type locality for species
- †Mytiloides
  - †Mytiloides columbianus

== N ==
- †Niobrarasaurus
  - †Niobrarasaurus coleii – type locality for species
- †Niobrarateuthis
  - †Niobrarateuthis bonneri – type locality for species
  - †Niobrarateuthis walkeri – type locality for species
- Nucula
  - †Nucula catherina
  - †Nucula rivulana – or unidentified comparable form
- Nuculana
  - †Nuculana mutata
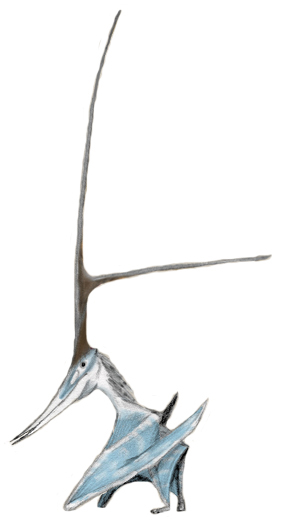
- Restoration of the Late Cretaceous pterosaur Nyctosaurus
  †Nyctosaurus
  - †Nyctosaurus bonneri – type locality for species
  - †Nyctosaurus gracilis – type locality for species
  - †Nyctosaurus nanus – type locality for species

== O ==
- †Ogmodirus – type locality for genus
  - †Ogmodirus martinii – type locality for species
- †Onychiopsis
  - †Onychiopsis psilotoides
- †Orepanochilus
  - †Orepanochilus kiowanus
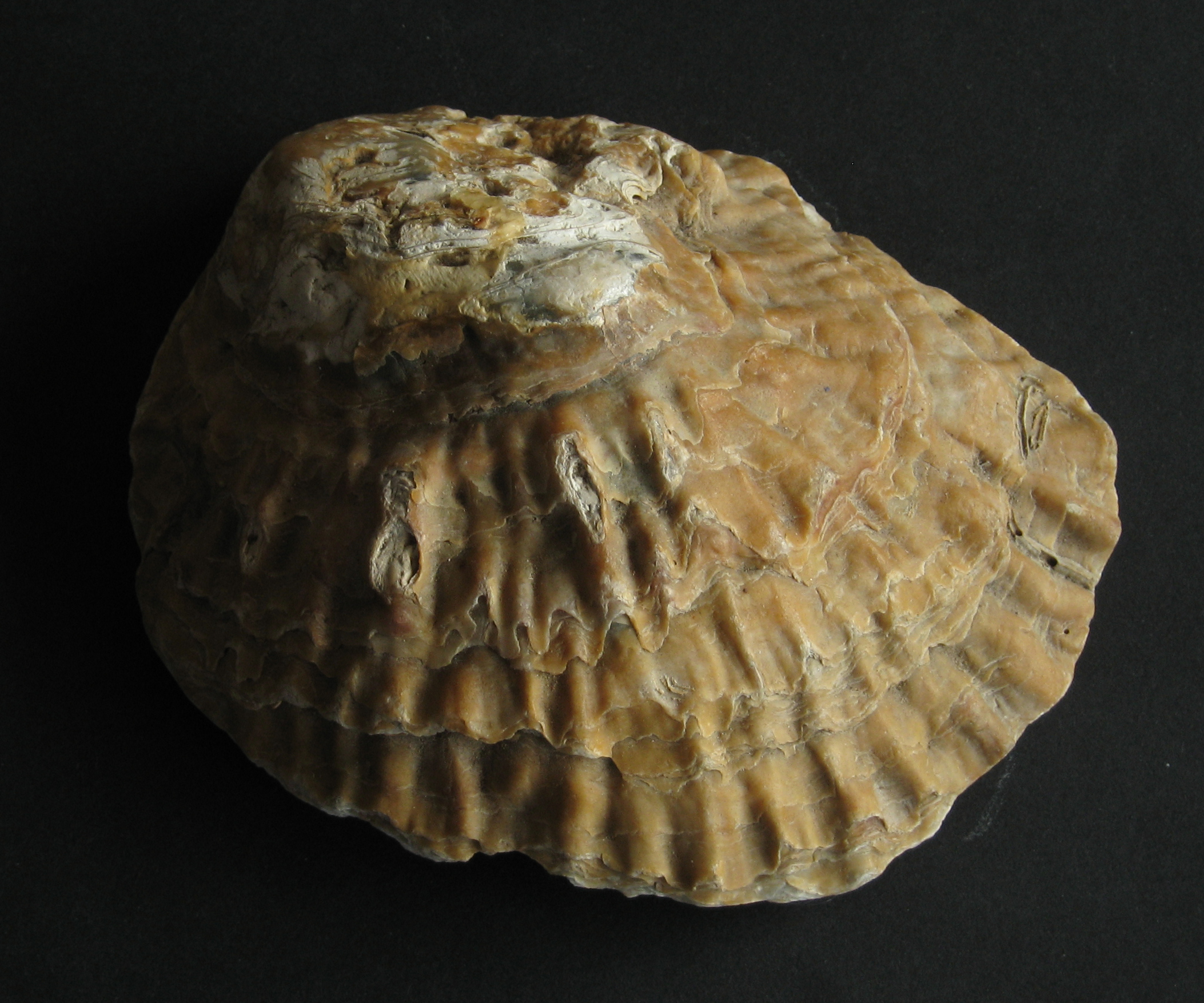
- Shell of an Ostrea, or oyster
  Ostrea
  - †Ostrea arcuata
  - †Ostrea lugubris
  - †Ostrea rugosa
- †Otostoma
- †Oxytropidoceras

== P ==
- †Pachyrhizodus
  - †Pachyrhizodus caninus – or unidentified comparable form
  - †Pachyrhizodus minimus
- †Parahesperornis – type locality for genus
  - †Parahesperornis alexi – type locality for species
- †Paraliodesmus
  - †Paraliodesmus guadagnii
- †Paxillitriletes
  - †Paxillitriletes dakotaensis
  - †Paxillitriletes vittatus
- †Pecten
  - †Pecten inconspicuus
- †Peilinia
  - †Peilinia quadriplicata
- †Phelopteria
  - †Phelopteria minuta
- Pholadomya
  - †Pholadomya belviderensis
- Pinus
  - †Pinus longifolius
- †Pirsila
- †Placenticeras
  - †Placenticeras meeki
- Platanus
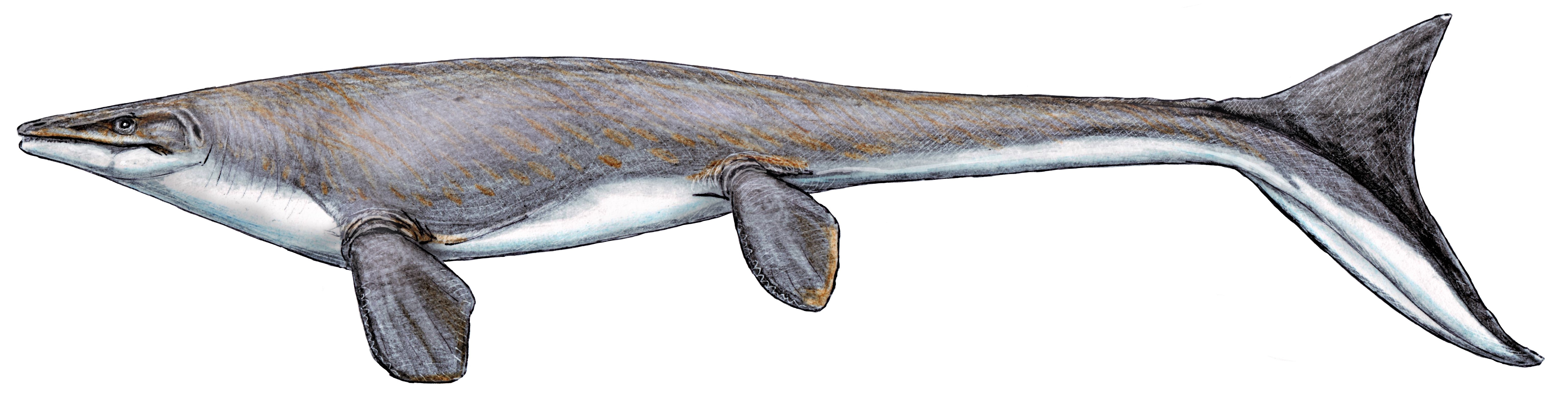
- Restoration of the Late Cretaceous mosasaur Platecarpus
  †Platecarpus
  - †Platecarpus planifrons – type locality for species
  - †Platecarpus tympaniticus
- †Platyceramus
  - †Platyceramus platinus
- †Platypterygius – or unidentified comparable form
- †Plesiochelys
  - †Plesiochelys belviderensis – type locality for species
- †Plesiosaurus
  - †Plesiosaurus gulo – type locality for species
- Plicatula
- †Polyacrodus – report made of unidentified related form or using admittedly obsolete nomenclature
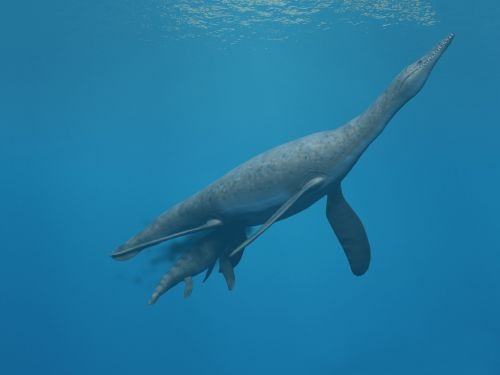
- Life restoration of the Late Cretaceous polycotylid plesiosaur Polycotylus giving birth
  †Polycotylus – type locality for genus
  - †Polycotylus latipinnis – type locality for species
- †Porthochelys – type locality for genus
  - †Porthochelys laticeps – type locality for species
- †Prionochelys
  - †Prionochelys galeotergum – type locality for species
- †Prionocyclus
  - †Prionocyclus hyatti
- †Prisca – tentative report
- †Protocardia
  - †Protocardia texana
- †Protosphyraena
  - †Protosphyraena tenuis
- †Protostega
  - †Protostega copei – type locality for species
- †Pseudoperna
  - †Pseudoperna bentonensis
  - †Pseudoperna congesta
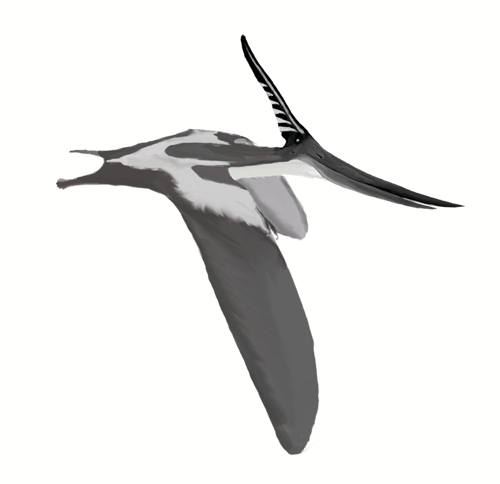
- Life restoration of the Late Cretaceous pterosaur Pteranodon
  †Pteranodon – type locality for genus
  - †Pteranodon comptus – type locality for species
  - †Pteranodon longiceps – type locality for species
  - †Pteranodon sternbergi – type locality for species
- †Pteria
  - †Pteria salinensis
- †Pterotrigonia
  - †Pterotrigonia emoryi
- †Ptychodus
  - †Ptychodus anonymus – or unidentified comparable form
  - †Ptychodus decurrens
  - †Ptychodus mortoni
  - †Ptychodus occidentalis
  - †Ptychodus whipplei
- †Ptychotrygon
  - †Ptychotrygon triangularis

== Q ==
- Quercus

== R ==
- †Raninella
  - †Raninella carlilensis
- †Repichnia
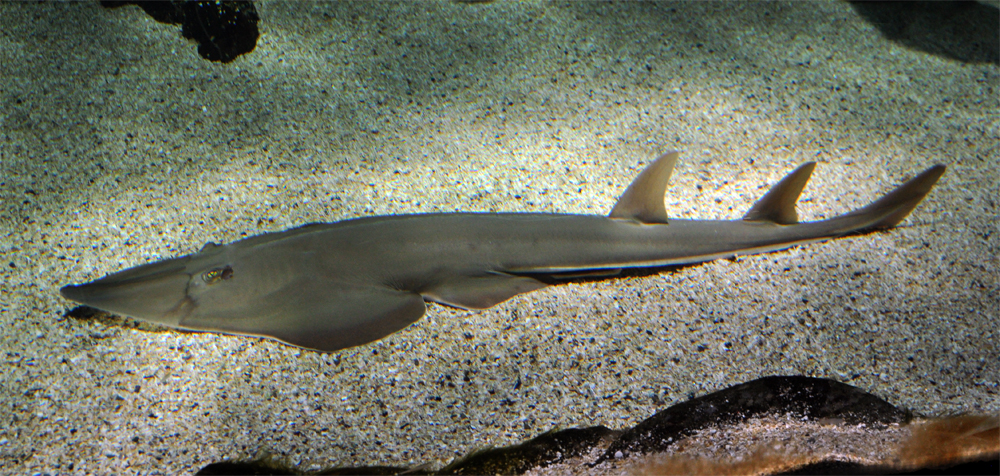
- A living Rhinobatos guitar fish
  Rhinobatos
  - †Rhinobatos incertus
- †Rhizocorallium
- †Ruffordia
  - †Ruffordia goepperti – or unidentified comparable form

== S ==
- †Sapindopsis
  - †Sapindopsis belviderensis
  - †Sapindopsis brevifolia
  - †Sapindopsis magnifolia
  - †Sapindopsis type A – informal
  - †Sapindopsis type B – informal
  - †Sapindopsis variabilis
- Sassafras
  - †Sassafras mudgii
  - †Sassafras mudgli
- †Scabratriletes
- †Scabtrigonia
  - †Scabtrigonia emoryi
- †Scapanorhynchus
  - †Scapanorhynchus rhaphiodon
- †Scaphites
  - †Scaphites plenus
- †Scolicia
- Scyliorhinus
- †Selmasaurus
  - †Selmasaurus johnsoni – type locality for species
- †Sequoia
  - †Sequoia condita
- Serpula
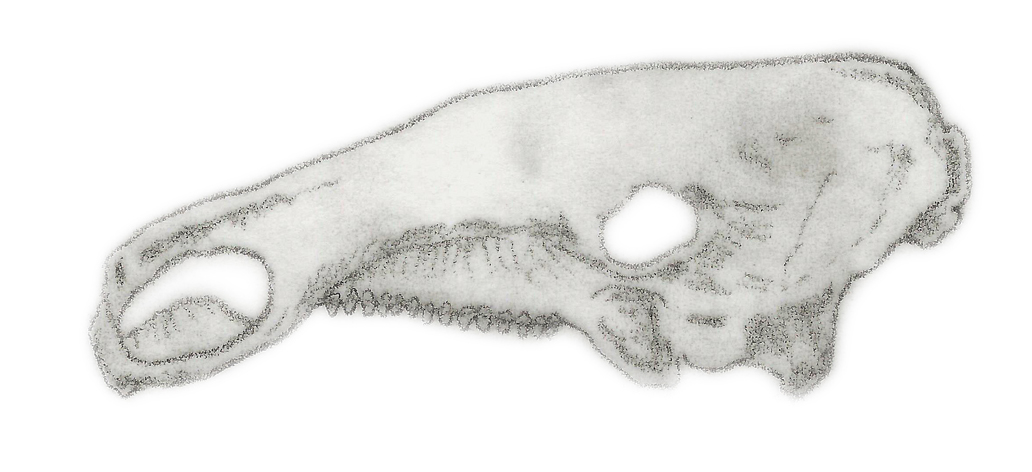
- Illustration of a fossilized cranium of the Late Cretaceous armored dinosaur Silvisaurus
  †Silvisaurus – type locality for genus
  - †Silvisaurus condrayi – type locality for species
- †Spermatites
  - †Spermatites piperiformis
- Squalicorax
  - †Squalicorax curvatus
  - †Squalicorax falcatus
  - †Squalicorax kaupi
  - †Squalicorax pristodontus – or unidentified comparable form
  - †Squalicorax volgensis
- †Squalocorax
- Sterculia
  - †Sterculia mucronata
  - †Sterculia towneri
- †Stoveris
  - †Stoveris achylosus
- †Stramentum
  - †Stramentum elegans
  - †Stramentum haworthi
- †Strepteneura
- †Striatriletes
  - †Striatriletes radialis
- Animated life restoration of the Late Cretaceous plesiosaur Styxosaurus
  †Styxosaurus – type locality for genus
  - †Styxosaurus snowii – type locality for species

== T ==
- Tellina
- †Terminonaris
  - †Terminonaris browni – or unidentified comparable form
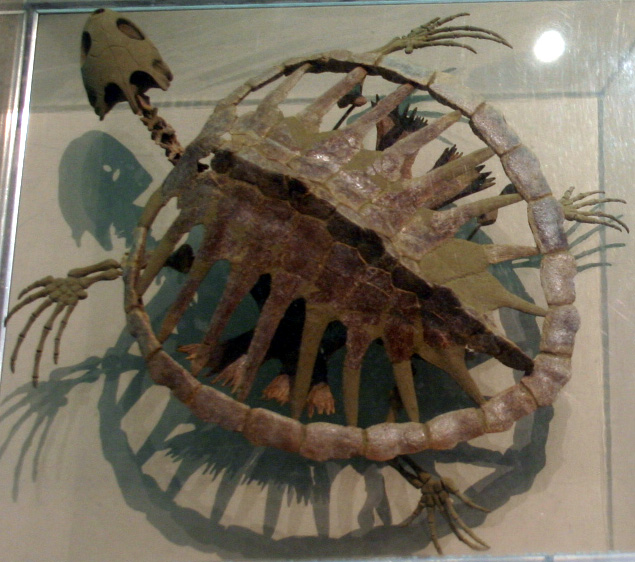
- Mounted fossilized skeleton of the Late Cretaceous sea turtle Toxochelys
  †Toxochelys
  - †Toxochelys latiremis
- Trachycardium
  - †Trachycardium kansasense
- †Tragodesmoceras
  - †Tragodesmoceras bassi
- †Trinacromerum – type locality for genus
  - †Trinacromerum bentonianum – type locality for species
- Turritella
  - †Turritella belviderei
  - †Turritella belviderensis
  - †Turritella kansasensis
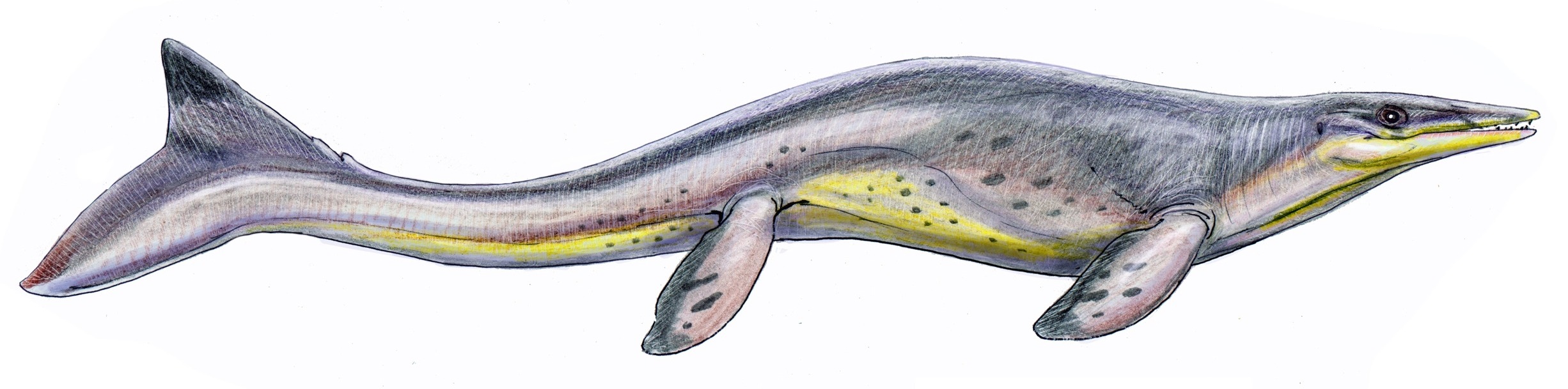
- Restoration of the Late Cretaceous mosasaur Tylosaurus
  †Tylosaurus
  - †Tylosaurus dyspelor
  - †Tylosaurus kansasensis – type locality for species
  - †Tylosaurus proriger

== U ==
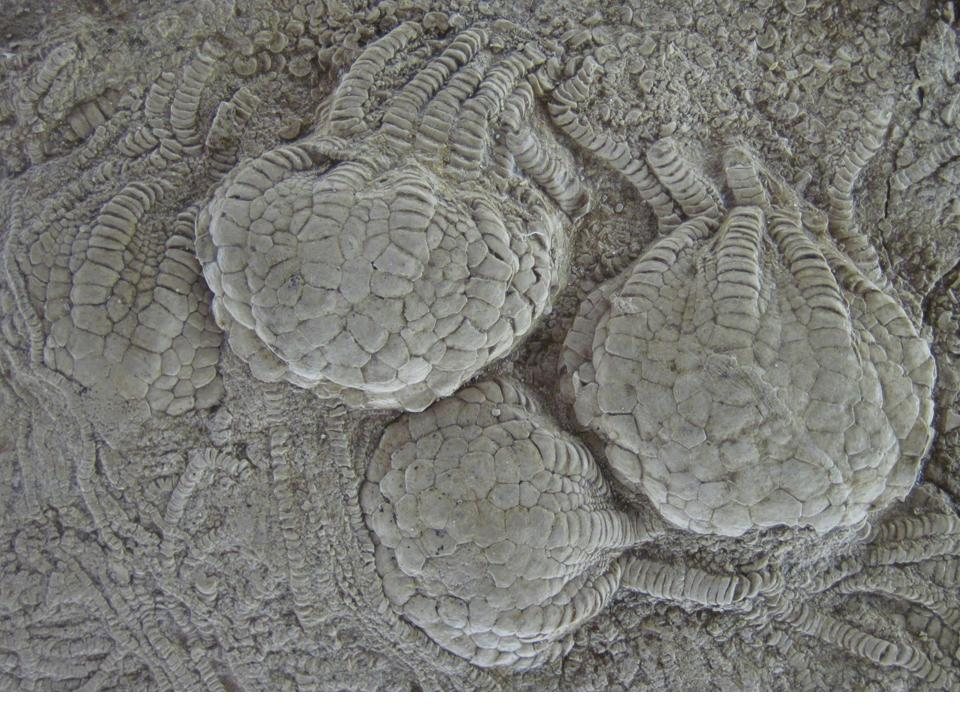
- Fossils of the Late Cretaceous crinoid ("sea lily") Uintacrinus
  †Uintacrinus
  - †Uintacrinus socialis
- †Urenchelys
  - †Urenchelys abditus – type locality for species

== V ==
- †Vitiphyllum

== X ==
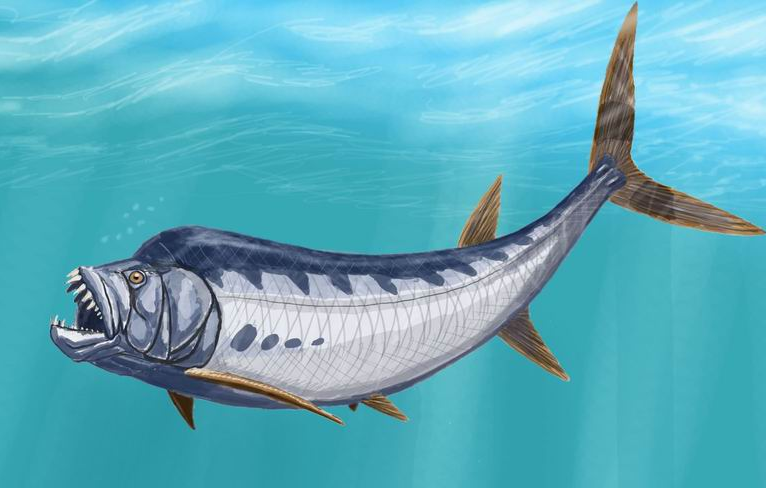
- Life restoration of the Cretaceous bony fish Xiphactinus
  †Xiphactinus
  - †Xiphactinus audax

== Y ==
- Yoldia
  - †Yoldia microdonta
