= Leptecodon =

Leptecodon Temporal range: Santonian

Scientific classification
- Kingdom: Animalia
- Phylum: Chordata
- Class: Actinopterygii
- Division: Teleostei
- Order: Aulopiformes
- Family: †Dercetidae
- Genus: †Leptecodon; Williston, 1899
- Species: †L. rectus

Binomial name
- †Leptecodon rectus Williston, 1899

Extinct genus of fishes

Leptecodon (meaning "slender tooth") is a genus of prehistoric marine aulopiform ray-finned fish from the Late Cretaceous (Santonian)-aged Smoky Hill Chalk of the Niobrara Formation in Kansas, US. It contains a single species, L. rectus, described by Williston in 1899.

It was likely a dercetid, a lineage of extinct slender-bodied aulopiforms with prominent scutes along their bodies. Only two Leptecodon specimens are known, both of which have been found inside fossil shells of the gigantic bivalve Platyceramus platinus. Some studies suggest that as with several other small Niobrara fish known only from fossils inside Inoceramus (including Omosoma, Kansius, and Urenchelys), Leptecodon lived inside Inoceramus as an inquiline and formed a symbiotic relationship with the clam, with Leptecodon fossils representing individuals that became trapped within their host clam following its death. In addition, one of the Leptecodon specimens has the bones of the extinct beardfish Omosoma inside it, suggesting that it ate the other fish.
