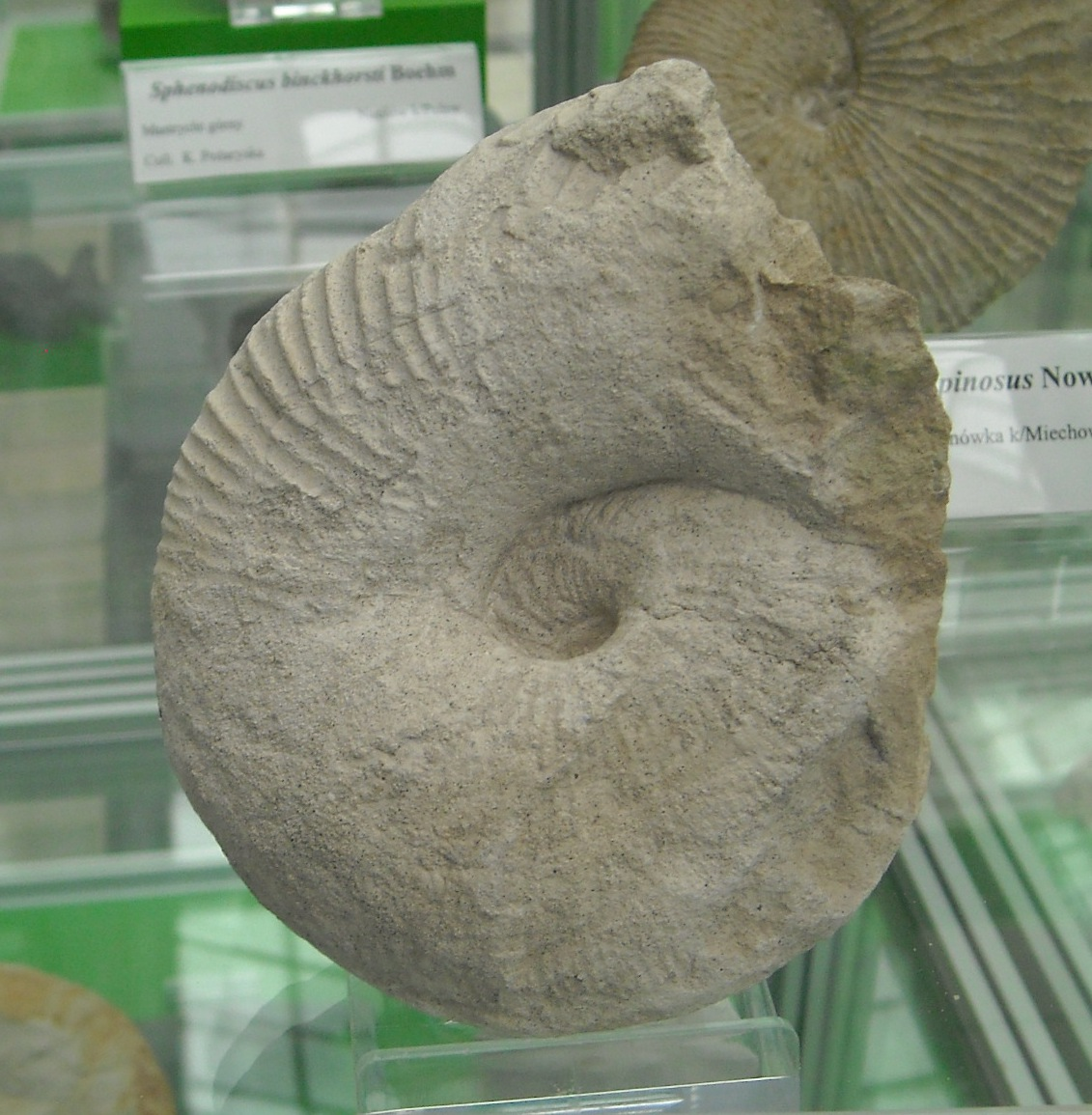
- A. tridens fossil

Scientific classification
- Domain: Eukaryota
- Kingdom: Animalia
- Phylum: Mollusca
- Class: Cephalopoda
- Subclass: †Ammonoidea
- Order: †Ammonitida
- Suborder: †Ancyloceratina
- Family: †Scaphitidae
- Subfamily: †Scaphitinae
- Genus: †Acanthoscaphites; Schluter, 1872

Species
- see text

= Acanthoscaphites =

Acanthoscaphites Temporal range: Late Campanian to Late Maastrichtian

Genus of molluscs (fossil)

Acanthoscaphites is an extinct genus of cephalopod belonging to the Ammonite subclass. The average diameter of its shell was approximately 20 millimetres (3/4 inch), but some specimens have been found with a diameter of slightly over 50 mm (2 in).

== Classification ==
Acanthoscaphites was first described by Schluter in 1872. Subsequent taxonomic revisions indicate that the relationship between Acanthoscaphites and Trachyscaphites is still unclear: Acanthoscaphites may have evolved in parallel with or as a derivative of Trachyscaphites.

Species

- A. plenus
- A. tridens
- A. verneuilianus

== Biogeography ==
Acanthoscaphites was a widespread genus during Campanian and Maastrichtian times, approximately 80 million years ago. Its remains can be found in rocks of that age from Europe and North America.
