= Kansius =

Kansius Temporal range: Santonian
- Life restoration of K. sternbergi

Scientific classification
- Kingdom: Animalia
- Phylum: Chordata
- Class: Actinopterygii
- Division: Teleostei
- Order: Beryciformes
- Suborder: Holocentroidei
- Genus: †Kansius; Hussakof, 1929
- Species: †K. sternbergi

Binomial name
- †Kansius sternbergi Hussakof, 1929

Genus of prehistoric fishes

Kansius is an extinct genus of prehistoric marine holocentroid ray-finned fish from the Late Cretaceous of North America. It contains a single species, K. sternbergi (named after its discoverer, George F. Sternberg) from the Santonian-aged Smoky Hill Chalk of the Niobrara Formation in Kansas, US. It has often been treated as a holocentroid related to modern squirrelfish, although doubt has been cast on the taxonomic placement of Cretaceous "holocentroids".

Type specimens

Kansius was a benthic fish whose remains have been exclusively found inside fossil shells of the giant inoceramid bivalve Platyceramus platinus. Some Platyceramus specimens preserve schools of up to 50 individual Kansius. It has thus been suggested that Kansius lived as an inquiline inside the shells of Platyceramus, and had a symbiotic relationship with it. As modern holocentrids are nocturnal, Kansius may have potentially lived inside Platyceramus in the daytime and emerged into the open at night.

== See also ==
- Prehistoric fish
- List of prehistoric bony fish
