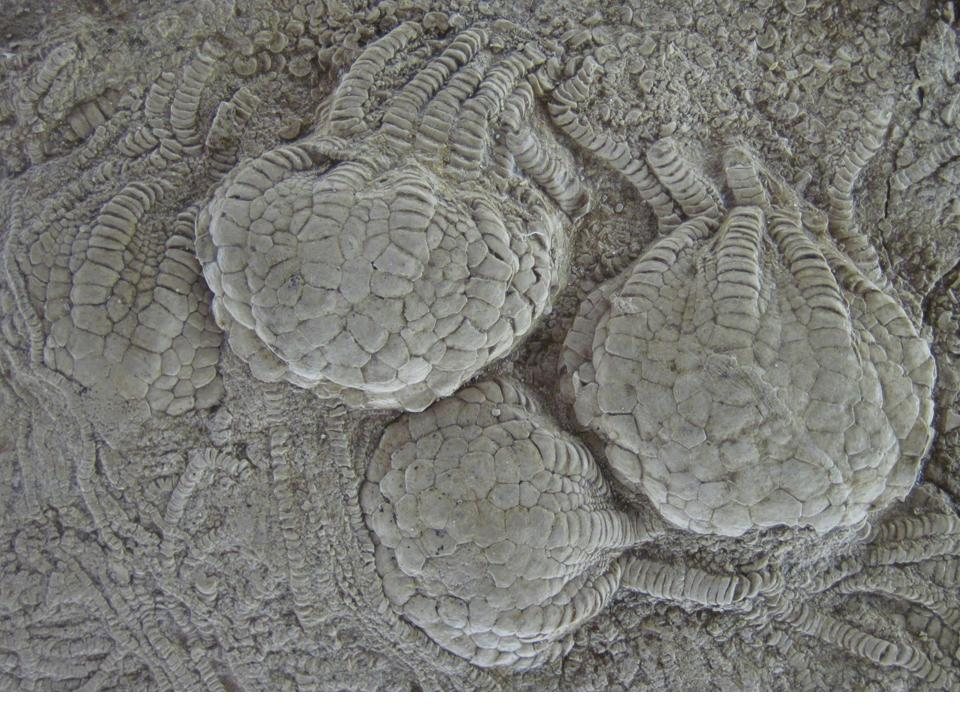
- Uintacrinus socialis

Scientific classification
- Kingdom: Animalia
- Phylum: Echinodermata
- Class: Crinoidea
- Order: †Uintacrinida
- Family: †Uintacrinidae
- Genus: †Uintacrinus; Grinnell, 1876

Species
- Uintacrinus anglicus; Uintacrinus socialis

= Uintacrinus =

Uintacrinus Temporal range: Cretaceous

Extinct genus of crinoids

Uintacrinus ("crinoid from the Uinta Mountains") is an extinct genus of crinoids from the Cretaceous of Kansas. It was unusual among crinoids because it had no stalk, and probably floated above the seafloor. It lived in the Western Interior Seaway. This crinoid was a colonial animal with ten long arms each that it used to capture prey.

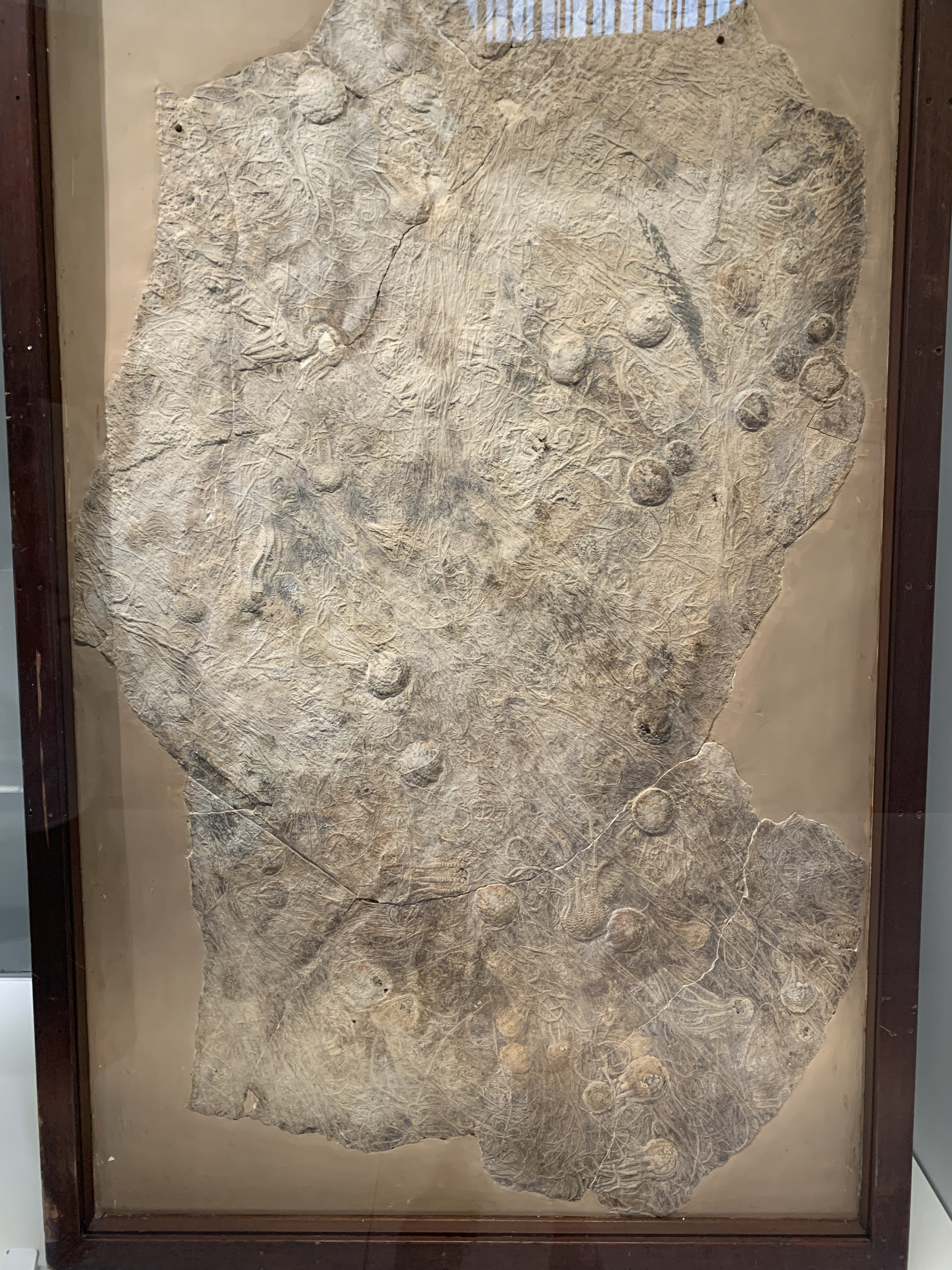
Block at the AMNH preserving at least 65 U. socialis individuals. Collected in Kansas.

== Sources ==
- Fossils (Smithsonian Handbooks) by David Ward (Page 174)
- "Notes on Uintacrinus socialis Grinnell" https://www.oceansofkansas.com/Uintacrinus.html
