= Omosoma =

Scientific classification
- Domain: Eukaryota
- Kingdom: Animalia
- Phylum: Chordata
- Class: Actinopterygii
- Order: Polymixiiformes
- Genus: †Omosoma; Costa, 1857

Extinct genus of fishes

Omosoma is an extinct genus of prehistoric ray-finned fish.

== See also ==
- Prehistoric fish
- List of prehistoric bony fish
