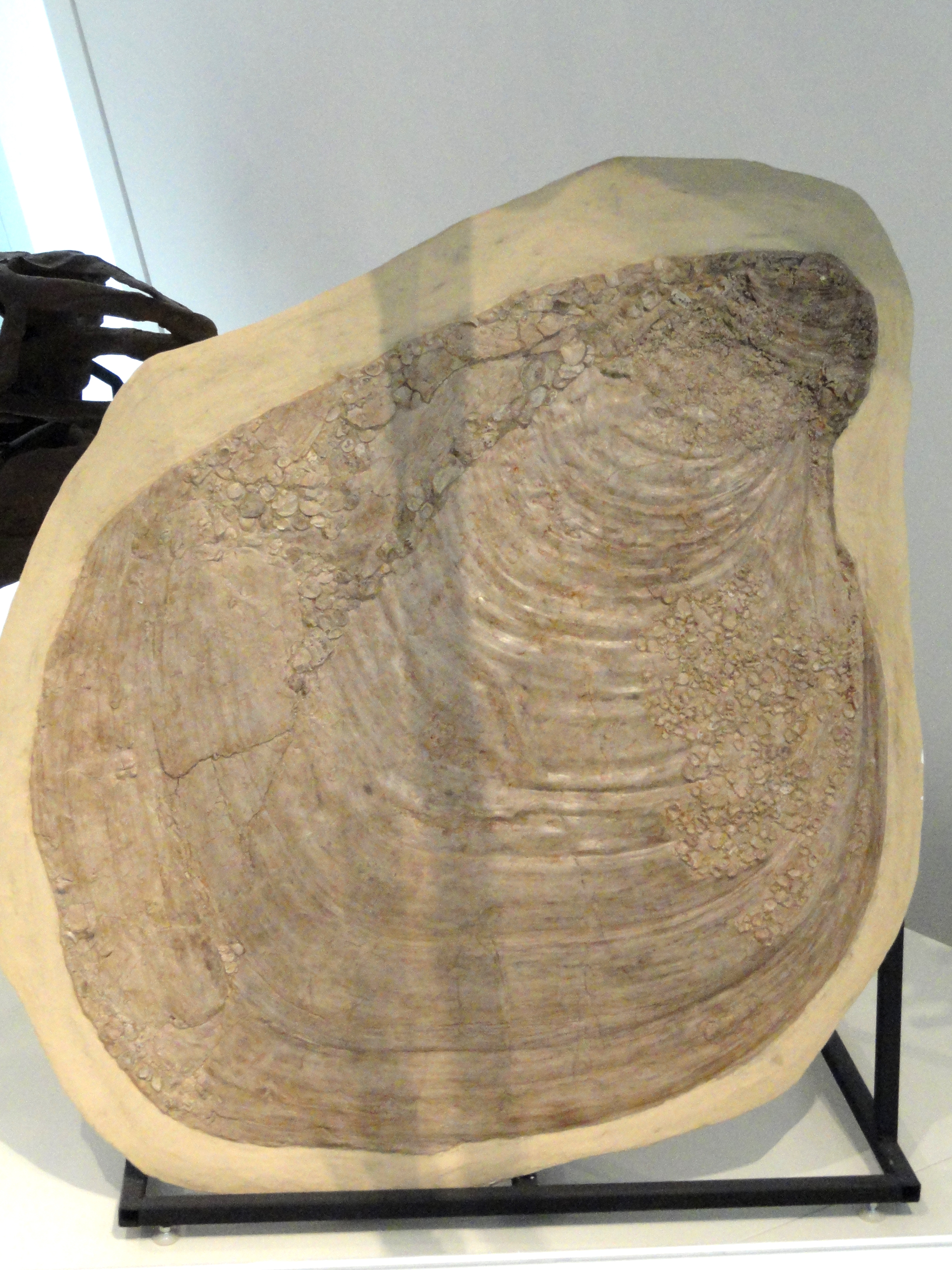
- Platyceramus platinus

Scientific classification
- Kingdom: Animalia
- Phylum: Mollusca
- Class: Bivalvia
- Order: Pteriida
- Family: †Inoceramidae
- Genus: †Platyceramus; Heinz, 1932

Species
- Platyceramus cycloides (Wegner, 1905); Platyceramus platinus (Logan, 1898)

= Platyceramus =

Platyceramus Temporal range: Cretaceous

Extinct genus of bivalves

Platyceramus was a genus of Cretaceous bivalve molluscs belonging to the extinct inoceramid lineage. It is sometimes classified as a subgenus of Inoceramus.

== Size ==
The largest and best known species is P. platinus. Individuals of this species typically reached 1 m (3 ft 3 in) or more in axial length, but some exceptional specimens 3 m (9 ft 10 in) long have been found, making it the largest known bivalve. Its huge but very thin shell often provided shelter for schools of small fish, some of which became trapped and fossilised themselves. The outer shell often provided habitat for its own juveniles, also for oysters such as the epizoic oyster Pseudoperna congesta, and barnacles.

Shells containing pearls have also been discovered.
