= Urenchelys =

Scientific classification
- Kingdom: Animalia
- Phylum: Chordata
- Class: Actinopterygii
- Division: Teleostei
- Order: Anguilliformes
- Genus: †Urenchelys; Woodward, 1900

Extinct genus of fishes

Urenchelys is an extinct genus of prehistoric bony fish. This genus is interesting as comprising the oldest known eels, which differ from all the tertiary and existing eels in still retaining the caudal fin.

== Generic characters ==
Teeth small, bluntly conical, and arranged in numerous series. Slender branchiostegal rays not curving round the opercular apparatus. Vertebrae exceeding 100 in number, the hindermost bearing a pair of expanded hypural bones. Pectoral fins present; dorsal fins arising immediately behind the occiput and extending to the caudal fin, which has stouter rays and is very small but separate. Scales Rudimentary.

== See also ==
- Prehistoric fish
- List of prehistoric bony fish
