= Pseudoperna =

Pseudoperna Temporal range: Cretaceous

Scientific classification
- Kingdom: Animalia
- Phylum: Mollusca
- Class: Bivalvia
- Order: Ostreida
- Family: Ostreidae
- Subfamily: incertae sedis
- Genus: †Pseudoperna; Logan, 1899

Species
- †Pseudoperna lapillicola (Marwick, 1926); †Pseudoperna rugosa Logan, 1899

Extinct genus of bivalves

Pseudoperna is a genus of extinct very small oysters. Pseudoperna lived in tight groups. This small oyster is commonly found attached in groups to the shell of large species such as Inoceramus. Pycnodonte and Pseudoperna are preserved mostly as calcitic valves and are also found attached to Mytiloides.
