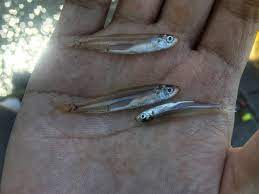
- Glassy sprat

Conservation status
- Least Concern (IUCN 3.1)

Scientific classification
- Kingdom: Animalia
- Phylum: Chordata
- Class: Actinopterygii
- Division: Teleostei
- Order: Clupeiformes
- Family: Hyperlophidae
- Genus: Hyperlophus
- Species: H. translucidus

Binomial name
- Hyperlophus translucidus McCulloch, 1917

= Glassy sprat =

Species of fish

The glassy sprat (Hyperlophus translucidus) is a type of sprat fish. The fish, when alive, is translucent, so it gets the second word in its scientific name from the Latin word translucidus, meaning transparent, diaphanous. In animal classification the glassy sprat belongs to Osteichthyes (some resources classified as Actinopterygii), Clupeiformes, Clupeidae, Hyperlophus. The glassy sprat is native to Australia and mainly found in Australia. It is marked as NE because it has not yet been evaluated by the World Animal Protection. It is mainly used as an economical aquatic product. In ecosystems, they are at the bottom end of the food chain, feeding mainly on plankton, which are less aggressive and very vulnerable to other fish. Glassy sprat are tiny in size and translucent with a silvery streak that extends from its tail to just behind its head. As early as a hundred years ago, Australians harvested the glassy sprat in large quantities and it featured on the table as food for a long time. Due to its poor appearance, it is not a very good ornamental fish.

== Other names ==
The glassy sprat is also known by the names; Glas-sandbrisling; grassy sprat; translucent sprat, and transparent sandy sprat.

== History ==
The glassy sprat is a marine and estuary species that occurs mainly in nearshore zones, seagrass areas, and shallow estuaries. It is often captured as a by-product of fisheries. Although it is easy to catch such fish because of its number, it has never been a commercial fish. Although the fish is often found in by-products of fisheries, catches like this only represent a very small fraction of the total population and do not have any negative impact on their population's survival. This species represents a small amount of by-catch in the New South Wales ocean hauling fishery, and has also been recorded as by-catch in the Moreton Bay prawn trawl fishery (Robins-Troeger, 1994). Due to its high number, humble size, and since it doesn't have an influence on its sea, it has been marked as Least Concern by IUCN.

== Biology ==
Glassy sprat is one kind of herring, so it has most of the characteristics of it. It's brackish water fish live in areas closer to the water surface, their head is small, body shape is streamlined, extended and side flat. The dorsal fin is located in the middle of the body opposite the abdominal fin, the belly side is silvery white.

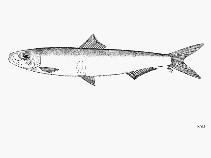

=== Color ===
Glassy sprats have a unique colour that distinguishes them from other fish of the same species. Its body is mostly black with some silver and translucent portions. There is translucent sprat all the way down their head to the caudal fin, and tiny black dots show irregularly on the back, dorsal and caudal fins, as well as on the lips and chin, and every anal-fin ray has a dark point.

=== Body structure ===
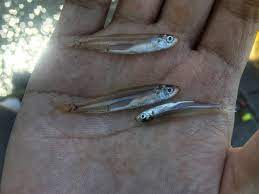
Body size of Glassy sprat

The larvae of the glassy sprat have an elongated body shape and are ovoid in cross-section. The general body shape of glassy sprat is side-flat, streamline, fairly elongate, the head of the it is small, however their eyes are big, with large mouth and long branchial cleft. In preflexion larvae, the head is small, but it starts to grow in postflexion and juvenile stages. Glassy sprats have 46-48 myomeres. They have striations on their hindgut, and their gut is long and straight. The swimbladder, which is found midway along their gut, is only inflated in larvae caught at night. The anal opening is a four-fifths distance along the underside of the body and the basal portion of the tail. The scales are small and the sidelines are straighter. Their dorsal fins and hip fins are symmetrical, and their tail fin is wedged shape. They do not have dorsal spines and anal spines. The number of their dorsal soft rays, anal soft rays. vertebrae, is 15–16, 19–22, 40-42 respectively. Belly keeled, with 17 + 9 scutes; about 19 dorsal scutes with low keels from head to dorsal fin origin. Second supra-maxilla paddle-shaped, lower portion larger, branchiostegal rays 4. Anal fin origin under or slightly behind base of last dorsal fin ray. The mineralized tissue of its scale is made up of hydroxylapatite, and its mineralized skeleton is composed of apatite. The snout of the glassy sprat is pointed and becomes rounded with growth but is initially dorso-ventrally flattened, and its mouth reaches the anterior of the eye but is moderate in size. There is no head spination, and small teeth can be seen in the jaws from 6.0 mm.

=== Size ===
As the larvae of the glassy sprat start to get older, their bodies start to thicken and become deeper. The usual size of the glassy sprat is the width of the adult's two fingers, and the width of the fish body is about two-thirds of the long of the first knuckles of an adult. Adult fish can have a maximum length of about six centimetres (2.4 in). Compared to other herrings, they are very small (the length of Clupea harengus adult fish is up to 45 cm (18 in) long) which is why they lack self-preservation in the face of other fish.

=== The auditory and visual system ===
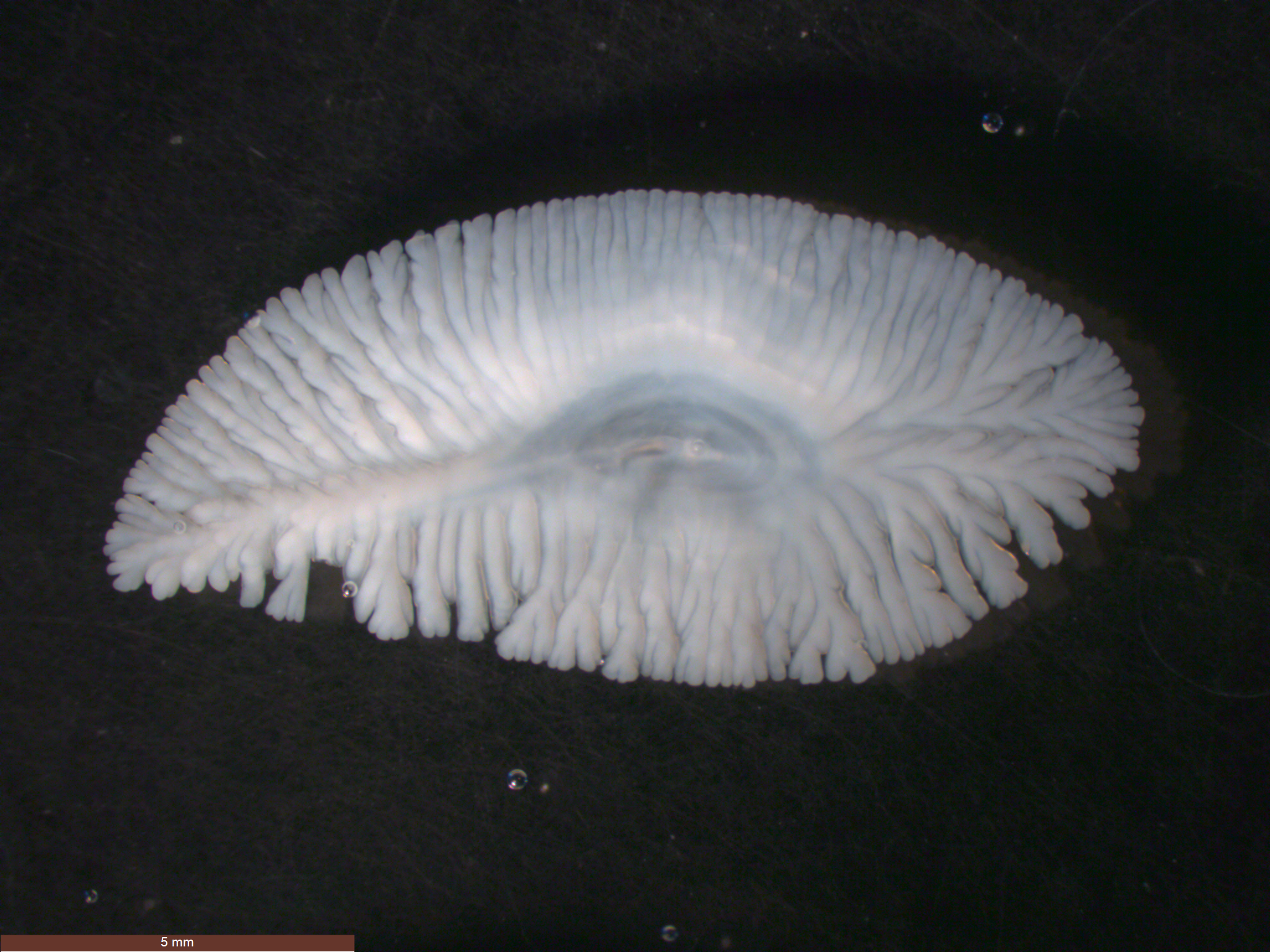
A picture of an Otolith of Centrolphus niger fish

Inferred from Actinopterygii, the glassy sprat's auditory system is otoliths. From the ancestral state deduced from Osteichthyes, the glassy sprat's eye lens can be described as spherical with increasing optical density towards the centre. The mineralized tissue of its otolith contains aragonite.

== Habits ==
Glassy sprat are diurnal, often gathering in large numbers and appearing in groups. Their primary food is unprotected small underwater insects and plankton. They mainly live in shallow salty and brackish waters with seagrass growing up to 50 metres (160 ft), including the Great Barrier Reef World Heritage Area and Marine Park, Moreton Bay Marine Park, the Great Sandy Marine Park, and the Jervis Bay Marine Park. Of the 52 fish species that can be caught in the seagrass area of sea area East Australia, glassy sprat has the highest fish density.

== Distribution ==
This fish belongs to the Australian characteristics of fish species, mainly in two states, Queensland and New South Wales and they often live in brackish water area closer to the mainland. They are absent during the daytime, and many preflexion larvae are present during the night.

Glassy sprats are pelagic and live inshore. They are found in shallow seagrasses, over sand adjacent to seagrasses, and in the shallow sandy parts of bays and estuaries. Glassy sprats are distributed across the Coral Sea, the Tasman Sea, and the South Pacific. According to the records, the location where the fish has been found is from Hervey Bay in Queensland through to the mid southern coast of NSW, including, Brisbane River, Mary River Heads, Caloundra, Moreton Bay, and Noosa River in Queensland; Port Stephens, Lake Illawarra, Lake Macquarie, Sans Souci (Botany Bay), in Sydney, Harbour and Jervis Bay in NSW.

The fish assemblage of glassy sprat in seagrass beds close to the estuary mouth is significantly different from those in beds located far from the mouth of the estuary. The population of glassy sprat in seagrass beds is higher at night than during the day. One reason for the difference is that fish can avoid the netting more efficiently during the day than they do at night. They may also go deeper to avoid bird predators during low tide during the day. During low tide at night, this avoidance would be unnecessary. Smaller seagrass beds have a more significant number of glassy sprat than medium and large beds.

Some tropical species' eggs and larvae are transferred southwards into temperate waters off the coast of New South Wales. As a result, tropical pelagic fish are unlikely to migrate to southern Queensland to spawn, as their offspring would be carried to areas with low survival rates. To be self-sustaining, tropical pelagic fish populations like glassy sprat in southern Queensland may need to travel northwards into more tropical locations to breed, with eggs and larvae being delivered southwards into the region by the East Australia Current. Another possibility is for a species to use behavioral or other mechanisms to prevent eggs and larvae from being transferred south into temperate waters.

The maximum latitude that it was found at was -25.2 degrees, and the minimum latitude was -34.95 degrees. The maximum longitude that glassy sprat was found at was 153.15 degrees, and the minimum longitude recorded was 150.73 degrees.

== Captivity ==
Glassy sprats require a specific set of precautions in order to create a suitable artificial environment and ensure their survival.

=== Tools needed ===
Lighting: aquarium lighting equipment includes metal halogen lamps, fluorescent lamps, mercury lamps and coral lamps, it is recommended to choose the appropriate light. Heating equipment: Small aquariums can use 100-300W electric heat pipes which is easy to buy and fixed to both ends of the tank. CO_{2} supplementation equipment: It can keep the water quality stable, and when the PH value of seawater drops, it can consider a method of supplementing carbon dioxide. Water quality testing equipment: It can be used to detect the pH of water.

=== A brackish tank ===
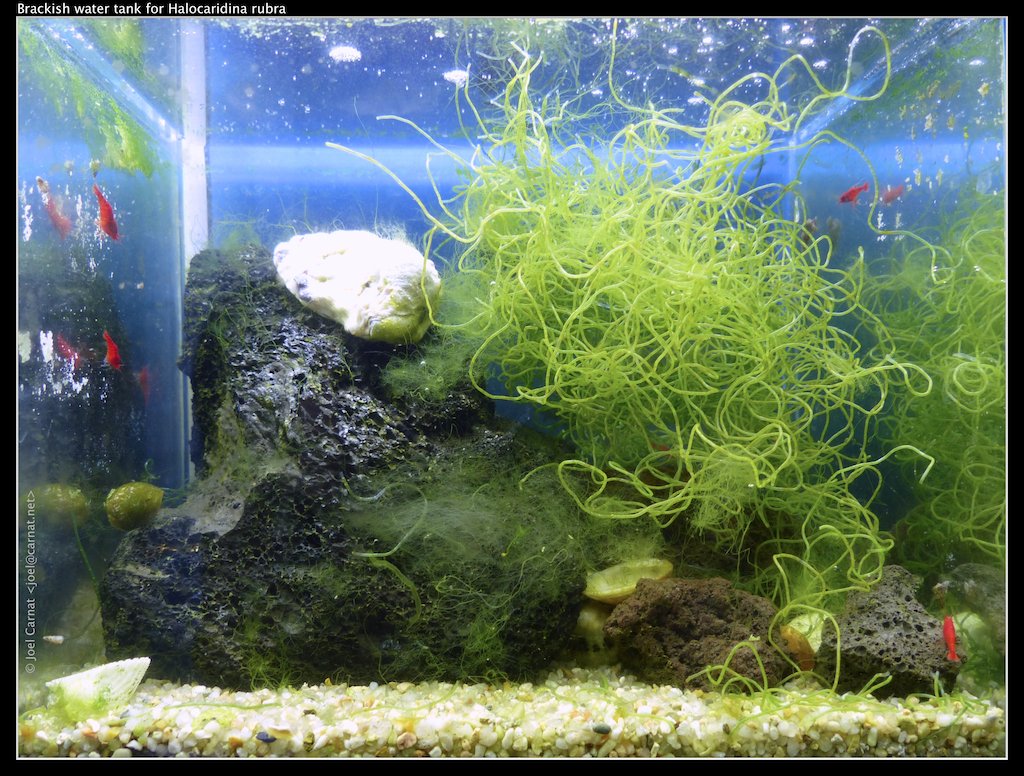
A brackish water tank

A brackish tank is required; normal water has different pH and alkalinity than sea water. The pH value of brackish tank should be around 8(±0.5 )and a specific gravity of 1.012(±0.8), At the same time, you need to use a humidifier to regulate the temperature of the aquarium to around 25 degrees Celsius. In this way, the fish can get a suitable living environment.

=== Configure the sea water ===
Generally, the finished artificial sea salt dissolved into fresh water, this is the common use of artificial seawater. Here are some things to watch out for, Do not use metal containers when mixing seawater. Take care to measure the water quality of sea water regularly every day, put the fish down after quality of the see water is stable. After making see water successful, cycle filtration, heating and oxidation should be initiated.

=== Aquascaping ===
This fish is more often active in seagrass areas, so the artificial environment should have a certain amount of seagrass. At the same time, some sand is required to create a more realistic eco-fish tank.

== Reproduction ==
Glassy sprat reproduces through sexual propagation, ovipara, and in vitro fertilization. Each female glassy sprat can lay tens of thousands of eggs and they scatter them freely in the sea. Male fish discharge a lot of semen after the female lays eggs, which causes the water to turn a different colour. Glassy sprat roe have mucus on the surface of their egg membrane and can be stuck to rocks, moss, and water grass. While their hatching success rate is low, the number of new offsprings born each year is a lot. The hatching time of fish eggs is variable, ranging from 1 to 5 days.

The eggs of sprats are translucency, extremely buoyancy, and delicacy. Their ova are 1.016 mm in diameter and spherical. The capsule is fragile, yet the transparent, colourless yolk that almost entirely fills the capsule has delicate lines or reticulations, as if the yolk were not separated into spheres The anal opening is a four-fifths distance along the underside of the body and the basal portion of the tail.

The eggs and larvae of the glassy sprat are plentiful in the sub-tropical waters of southern Queensland during late winter and early spring (June–October), when the average monthly sea surface temperature ranges from 21 to 23 °C (70 to 73 °F). The females spawn an average of one per week. The hatching time of fish eggs is variable, ranging from 1 to 5 days. After hatching, the baby fish will use estuaries for food and shelter, such as the estuary in south-east Queensland, and will then return to the open sea after a while (Pham, 2002). Spawning in the subtropical waters of southern Queensland during late winter and early spring helps the fish expand the amount of habitat accessible to each species, which maximises their potential population sizes.

== Importance to humans ==
The glassy sprat is not used for commercial or recreational purposes. It is not used as an ornamental fish.

== Vulnerability ==
Glassy sprats' vulnerability traits include close association with threatened taxa and threatened habitat. They follow a narrow depth range and restricted horizontal distribution, making their habitat particularly vulnerable to human destruction. One of its other vulnerability characteristics is being a bycatch in commercial fisheries. They have been found in the bycatch of the Moreton Bay prawn trawl fishery (Robins-Troeger, 1994) and are one of the species that make up less than 1% of the bycatch in the NSW Ocean Hauling Fishery. Since glassy sprats move between estuaries and utilise the area for food and shelter, particularly during the larvae and juvenile phase, their vulnerability to impacts expands as a few estuaries in the Northern Catchment Management Authority have been categorised as "modified" or "extremely modified."

== Differences and similarities between glassy sprat and sandy sprat ==
The sandy sprat and the glassy sprat are the two species of the genus Hyperlophus, and similarities and differences are present between the two species.

=== Differences ===
	Glassy Sprat	Sandy Sprat
Distribution	The glassy sprat is distributed across Queensland and New South Wales.	The sandy sprat is found in the mainland states of Southern Australia.
Biology	The glassy sprat has 40-42 myomeres in its body. The glassy sprat's preflexion larvae have 1 or 2 melanophores along the ventral midline of the tail. The anal fin in the glassy sprat commences below the rear of the dorsal fin. The glassy sprat has deciduous scales.	The sandy sprat has 46-48 myomeres in its body. The sandy sprat's preflexion larvae have 2-4 melanophores along the ventral midline of the tail. The anal fin in the sandy sprat originates well behind the dorsal fin. The sandy sprat has firm scales.
Uses	The glassy sprat is not used for commercial purposes.	The sandy sprat is reared for commercial purposes and is also used as a bait. Because the sandy sprat is a common prey for piscivorous fishes and birds, it plays an important role in food web trophic dynamics and is indirectly commercially important in the Murray Estuary and Coorong.

=== Similarities ===
==== a. Vulnerability and Distribution ====
- Both the sandy sprat and the glassy sprat are found in shallow sandy areas of bays and estuaries.
- Both have been classified as "Least Concern" by IUCN, and they pose no threat to humans.

==== b. Biology ====
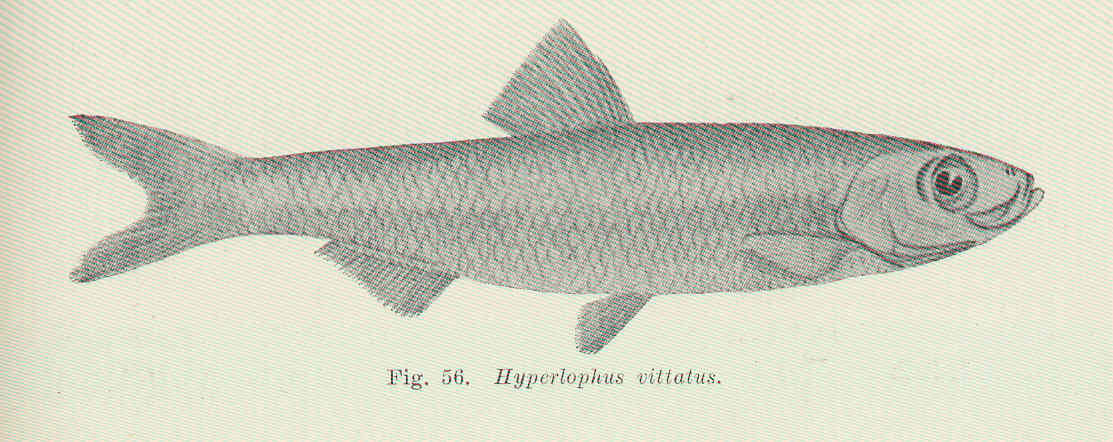
- Sandy sprat
  Both the sandy sprat and the glassy sprat have a fairly elongated body.
- Both of them have a paddle-shaped second supramaxilla, where the lower portion is larger.
- Both of their eggs are delicate and transparent.
- In the transforming larvae of both the sandy sprat and the glassy sprat, several small melanophores develop in the anterior portion of the midbrain and on the jaws.
- Juveniles of both species have many small melanophores over the upper portion of their trunk and tail and along the dorsal fin rays.
- Their bodies thicken as they get older in both the sandy sprat and the glassy sprat, which gradually obscures the melanophores along the gut and over the swim bladder in transforming larvae. They are not visible in juveniles.

== Bibliography ==
- "Species: Hyperlophus translucidus (Glassy Sprat)". Atlas of Living Australia.
- Dempster, T.; Kingsford, M. (2004). "Drifting objects as habitat for pelagic juvenile fish off New South Wales, Australia". Marine and Freshwater Research. 55 (7): 675–687. Bibcode:2004MFRes..55..675D. doi:10.1071/MF04071.
- Jack G.; Joan Greenwood; and Greg A. Skilleter (2002). "Comparison of demersal zooplankton in regions with differing extractive-dredging history, in the subtropical". Plankton Biol. Ecol. 49 (1): 17–26.
- Munroe, T. A.; Wongratana, T.; and Nizinski, M. S. "Herrings (also, sardines, shads, sprats, pilchards, and menhadens)". In K.E. Carpenter and V.H. Niem (eds.). FAO species identification guide for fishery purposes. Rome: FAO. pp. 1775–1784.
