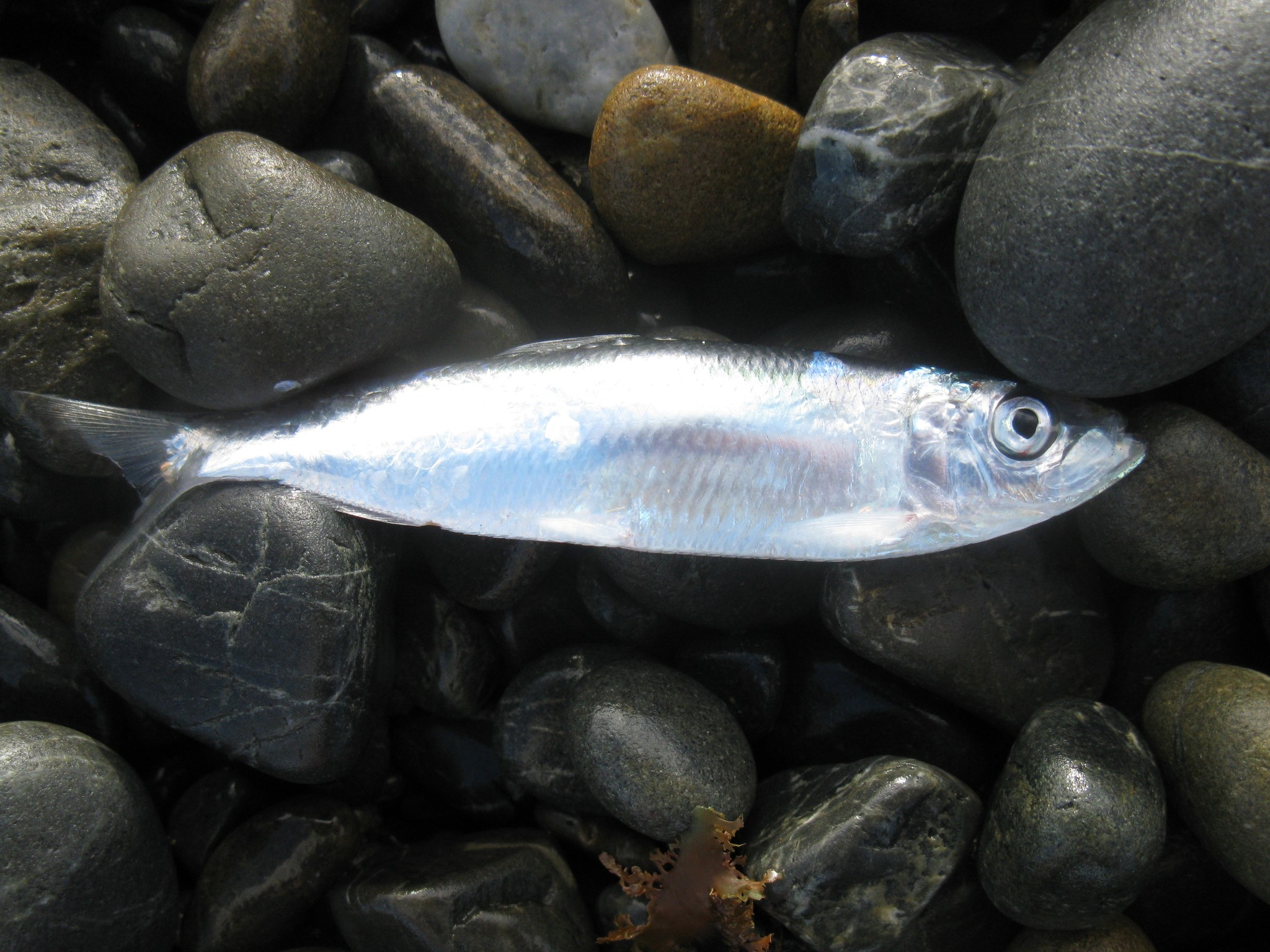

Conservation status
- Least Concern (IUCN 3.1)

Scientific classification
- Kingdom: Animalia
- Phylum: Chordata
- Class: Actinopterygii
- Order: Clupeiformes
- Family: Clupeidae
- Genus: Sprattus
- Species: S. antipodum

Binomial name
- Sprattus antipodum (Hector, 1872)

= New Zealand blueback sprat =

Species of fish

The New Zealand blueback sprat (Sprattus antipodum; Māori: kupae or marakuha) is a herring-like, forage fish of the family Clupeidae found in the waters around New Zealand, between latitudes 37° S and 48° S, and longitude 166° E and 180° E, to depths of up to 50 m. It belongs to the genus Sprattus, a small oily fish usually known by their common name, sprats. Its length is up to 12 cm.

The species schools in coastal waters primarily on the bottom or midwater, with shoals of fish seen on the surface usually only in summer. It is fished mainly in subsistence fisheries and occasionally used as fishing bait.

== See also ==
- New Zealand sprat

== Bibliography ==
- Armitage, R.O.; Payne, D.A.; Lockley, G.J.; Currie, H.M.; Colban, R.L.; Lamb, B.G.; Paul, L.J., eds. (1994). Guide book to New Zealand commercial fish species (Revised ed.). Wellington, New Zealand: New Zealand Fishing Industry Board.
