= New Zealand sprat =

Conservation status
- Least Concern (IUCN 3.1)

Scientific classification
- Kingdom: Animalia
- Phylum: Chordata
- Class: Actinopterygii
- Order: Clupeiformes
- Family: Clupeidae
- Genus: Sprattus
- Species: S. muelleri

Binomial name
- Sprattus muelleri (Klunzinger, 1879)

Species of fish

The New Zealand sprat (Sprattus muelleri; Māori: kupae or marakuha) is a herring-like, marine fish in the family Clupeidae found in the subtropical southwest Pacific Ocean endemic to New Zealand. It belongs to a genus Sprattus of small oily fish, usually known by their common name, sprats.

Its depth range is from the surface to 110 m, and its length is up to 13 cm.

== See also ==
- New Zealand blueback sprat
