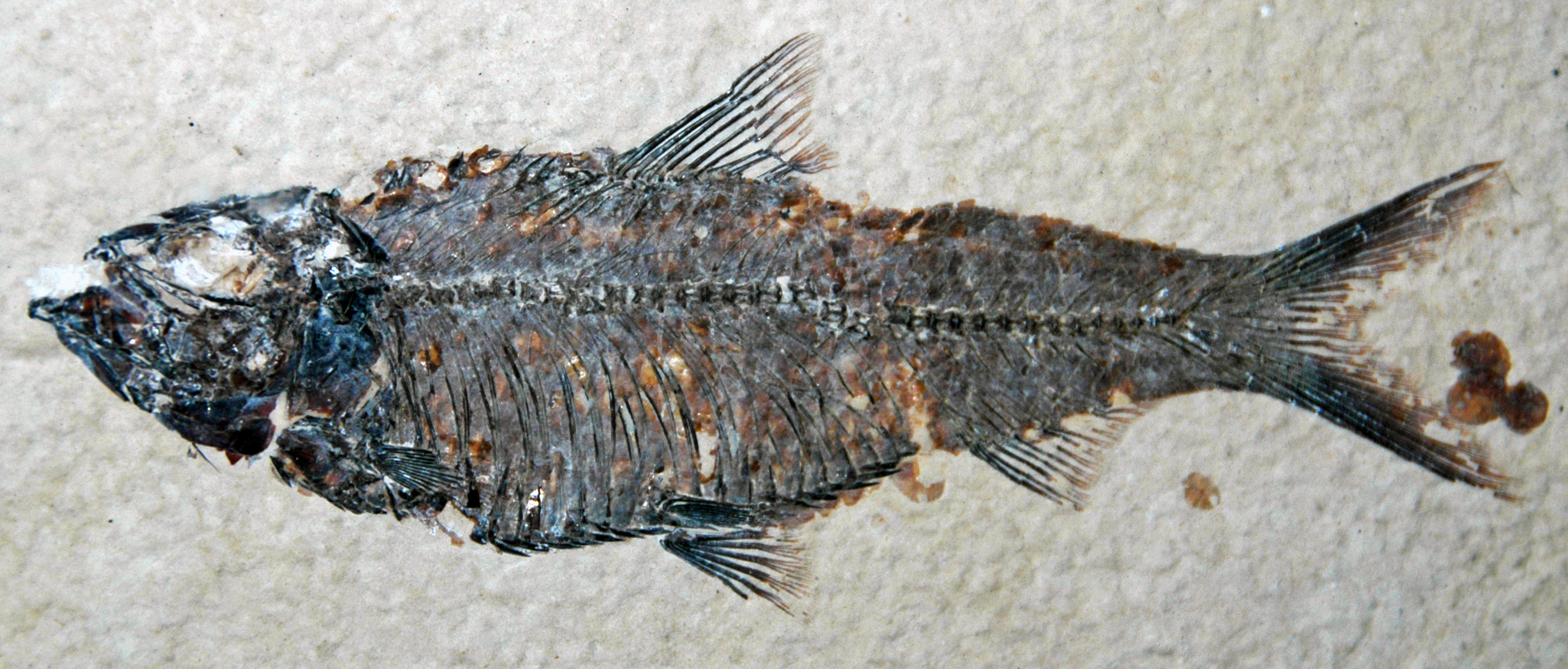

- Specimen of K. eocaena (top) and K. alta (bottom)

Scientific classification
- Kingdom: Animalia
- Phylum: Chordata
- Class: Actinopterygii
- Division: Teleostei
- Order: Clupeiformes
- Family: Hyperlophidae
- Genus: †Knightia; Jordan, 1907

Type species
- Clupea humilis Leidy, 1856

Species
- K. alta (Leidy, 1873); K. bohaiensis Zhang, Zhou & Qing, 1985; K. eocaena Jordan 1907; K. vetusta Grande, 1982

Synonyms
- Clupea alta (Leidy, 1873); Clupea eocaena Jordan, 1907; Clupea humilis Leidy, 1856; Clupea pusilla Cope, 1870; Knightia copei Tanner, 1925

= Knightia =

Knightia Temporal range: Middle Paleocene to Middle Eocene (Bartonian), 61–38 Ma

Extinct genus of fishes

Knightia is an extinct genus of freshwater clupeiform fish, related to modern herrings, that lived in the lakes and rivers of western North America and eastern Asia during the Paleocene and Eocene epoches. Knightia eocaena, the common species from the Early Eocene-aged Green River Formation of Wyoming, is the most commonly excavated fossil fish in the world, and as a whole the most commonly found articulated vertebrate fossil in the world. It is the official state fossil of Wyoming.

== Taxonomy ==
=== Taxonomic history ===
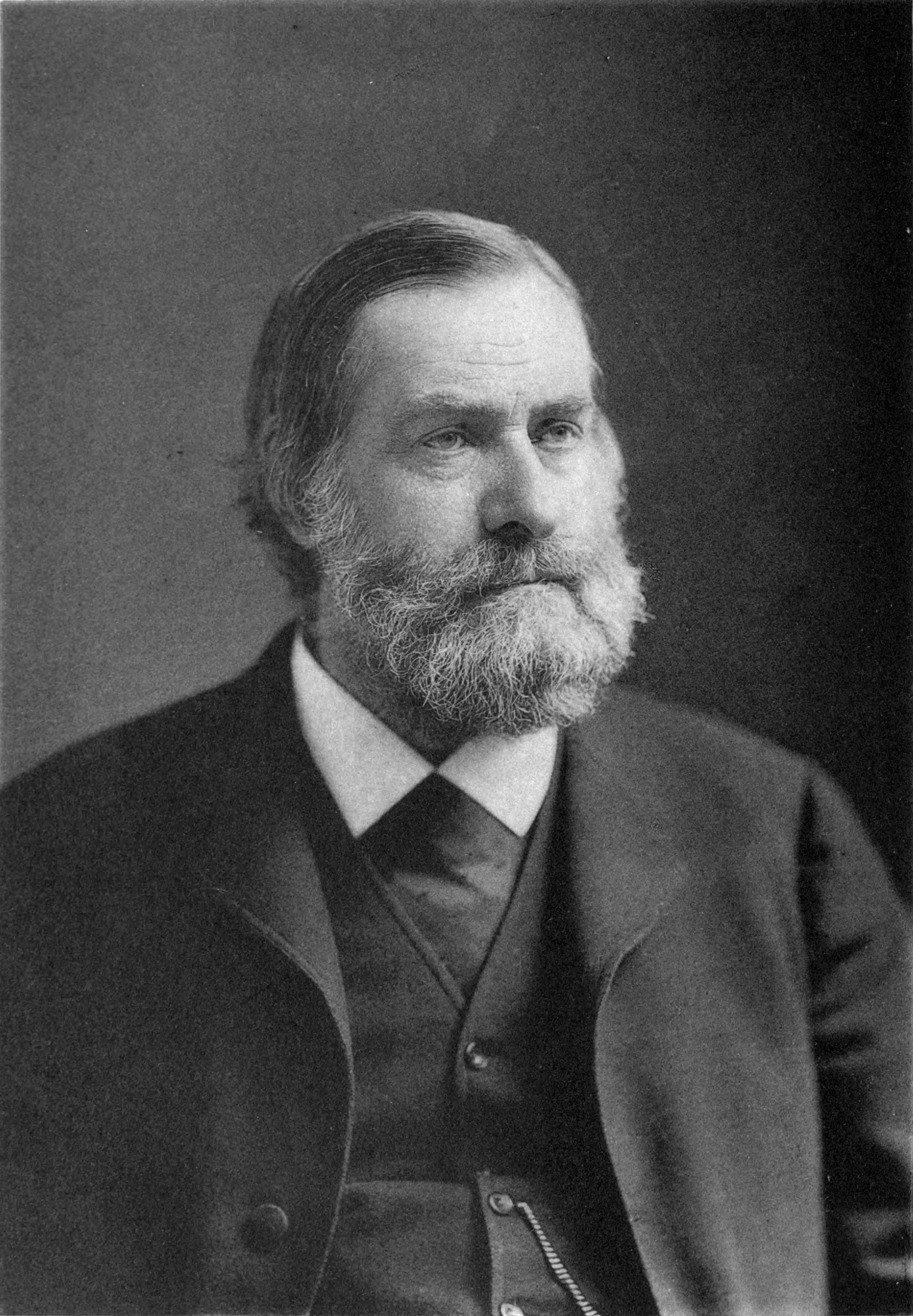
The two American species within Knightia were identified by Joseph Leidy, who conducted numerous studies into the paleobiota of the American West

In 1856, paleontologist Joseph Leidy described a species of herring-like fish from a weathered specimen found in the Wyoming Territory, along the Green River, by Dr. John Evans, United States Geologist to the Territories of Washington and Oregon. This specimen was water-worn but nearly complete, only missing its pectoral fins, and appeared to originate from the Eocene-aged shales of the Green River Formation. Leidy identified it as belonging to the modern genus Clupea, which contains the herrings commonly harvested for food in the Northern Hemisphere, and named it Clupea humilis. By the 1870s, the city of Green River had been established in the area, and a massive deposit of fossil fish skeletons was discovered along a railroad cut (colloquially called the "Petrified Fish cut") near Rock Springs station. In 1873, Leidy identified many more specimens of Clupea humilis from the Petrified Fish cut, but also identified a slightly different fish with a slightly higher body, and named it Clupea alta. In 1877, Edward Drinker Cope would reclassify both these species into the newly-described genus Diplomystus, which also contained a much larger herring-like fish (D. dentatus) found in the same deposits. This classification would continue to be followed for several decades.

In 1907, David Starr Jordan noted that Clupea humilis was a junior homonym of Clupea humilis von Meyer, 1851, another fossil clupeiform known from the Early Miocene of Germany (this other species is now classified in the genus Clupeonella as Clupeonella humilis). Another name coined by Cope in 1870, Clupea pusilla (later synonymized with C. humilis), was also found to be preoccupied by Clupea pusilla Mitchill, 1814, a synonym for the hickory shad (Alosa mediocris). In addition, Jordan determined the humilis+alta clade to be morphologically distinct from Diplomystus, and deserving of its own genus. For this reason, Jordan coined the new genus Knightia for these two species, named in honor of the late University of Wyoming professor Wilbur Clinton Knight, "an indefatigable student of the paleontology of the Rocky Mountains." The new species name Knightia eocaena (referring the species' occurrence in the Eocene) was coined to replace the preoccupied species name Clupea humilis.

=== Classification ===
Fossil school of K. alta

Knightia belongs to the same taxonomic order (Clupeiformes) as herring and sardines, and resembled the former closely enough that both K. alta and K. eocaena were originally described as species of true herring in the genus Clupea. It was only distantly related to a much larger co-occurring clupeomorph in the Green River deposits, Diplomystus, which commonly preyed upon Knightia. Diplomystus belonged to the Ellimmichthyiformes, a now-extinct clupeomorph order.

Although Knightia is classified as a clupeiform, a more refined placement within the order has long been uncertain, although multiple studies have found it to not be related to any of the clupeiforms currently found in the Americas. In a 1982 revision, Grande placed the genus in the subfamily Pellonulinae based on anatomical details. Knightia was determined to be the oldest known pellonuline and the only member known to have inhabited the Americas. Specimens of Knightia from the former Lake Gosiute were found to be morphologically distinct from those in the other two Green River lakes, and described as their own genus Gosiutichthys. This genus was not thought to be closely related to Knightia, and was instead placed in the subfamily Clupeinae.

However, phylogenetic studies in the mid-late 2010s led to a major taxonomic revision of the Clupeiformes, finding many of the previous clades within the order, including Pellonulinae, to be paraphyletic as previously defined. This led to numerous clades being split or found to be invalid. The placement of many fossil clupeiforms, including Knightia, became uncertain due to these studies being primarily based on molecular genetics rather than morphology. Following these revisions, Near & Thacker (2024) placed Knightia in the family Clupeidae, but Kevrekidis et al (2024) found no strong evidence for any specific affinity between Knightia and any crown group clupeiform family, and thus placed it as a clupeoid of uncertain placement. Kevrekidis et al also noted that Knightia and Gosiutichthys shared close similarities to one another.

In 2026, Marramà & Carnevale conducted a major taxonomic revision of most fossil clupeomorphs in both the Ellimmichthyiformes and Clupeiformes. They determined that Knightia and Gosiutichthys were sister taxa (in contrast to Grande's conclusion), and based on morphological similarities, found the two genera to be most closely related to two modern clupeiforms found in freshwater and marine habitats of Australia, Potamalosa & Hyperlophus. These two genera are generally placed in the family Clupeidae alongside several other genera, including the true herrings of Clupea. However, with the addition of the two fossil genera to the clade, the Australian herring clade was found to shift into a more basal position within the large herring radiation, with the rest of the Clupeidae instead forming a clade with Ehiravidae, Alosidae, and Dorosomatidae. For this reason, the clade comprising Knightia, Gosiutichthys, Potamalosa and Hyperlophus was redefined as the revived family Hyperlophidae, a change recognized by Eschmeyer's Catalog of Fishes.

=== Species ===
The following species are known:

- K. alta (Leidy, 1873) - Early to Middle Eocene (Ypresian to Lutetian) of Wyoming, US (Fossil Butte & Laney Members of Green River Formation)
- K. bohaiensis Zhang, Zhou & Qing, 1985 - Middle Eocene (Bartonian) of Shandong, China (Shahejie Formation)
- K. eocaena Jordan, 1907 - Early Eocene of Wyoming, US (Fossil Butte Member of the Green River Formation)
- K. vetusta Grande, 1982 - Middle Paleocene of Montana, US (Tongue River Member of Fort Union Formation)

The species "Knightia" yuyanga Liu, 1963 from China was first identified as Eocene when described in 1963. The age of "K." yuyanga has been revised with the placement of the species' type locality in the Late Cretaceous Paomagang Formation. Additionally the species placement in Knightia has been questioned, and the species is now treated as "Clupeid incertae sedis".

The Cretaceous genus Ellimma from Brazil was formerly synonymized into Knightia as Knightia branneri by Schaeffer (1947). This placement was rejected by Grande (1982) and subsequent authors, and the species moved back to Ellimma branneri. Another Brazilian clupeiform from the Pliocene originally described in Knightia, K. brasiliensis Woodward, 1939 was reclassified into its own genus, Paleopiquitinga in 2010.

== Anatomy ==
In Knightia fish, rows of dorsal and ventral scutes run from the back of the head to the medial fins. They had heavy scales and small conical teeth. Their size varied by species: Knightia eocaena was the longest, growing up to 25 cm (10 in), though most specimens are no larger than 15 cm. K. alta was shorter and relatively wider, with specimens averaging between 6 and 10 cm. Due to both species being sympatric with one another, it has been previously disputed whether they represent distinct species or not, but in many mass death assemblages of K. eocaena, no fossils have K. alta have been noted, supporting the idea that both species lived segregated from one another and likely represent distinct species.

== Paleoecology ==
As with modern-day clupeids, Knightia spp. likely fed on algae and diatoms, as well as insects and occasionally smaller fish. In a 2022 paper, researchers announced they had detected biological residues in Knightia fossils from the Green River Formation, confirming that biological residues can last for millions of years in well-preserved fossil organisms.

A small schooling fish, Knightia made an abundant food source for larger Eocene predators. The Green River Formation has yielded many fossils of larger fish species preying on Knightia; specimens of Diplomystus, Lepisosteus, Amphiplaga, Mioplosus, Phareodus, Amia, and Astephus have all been found with Knightia in either their jaws or stomachs.

== Gallery ==
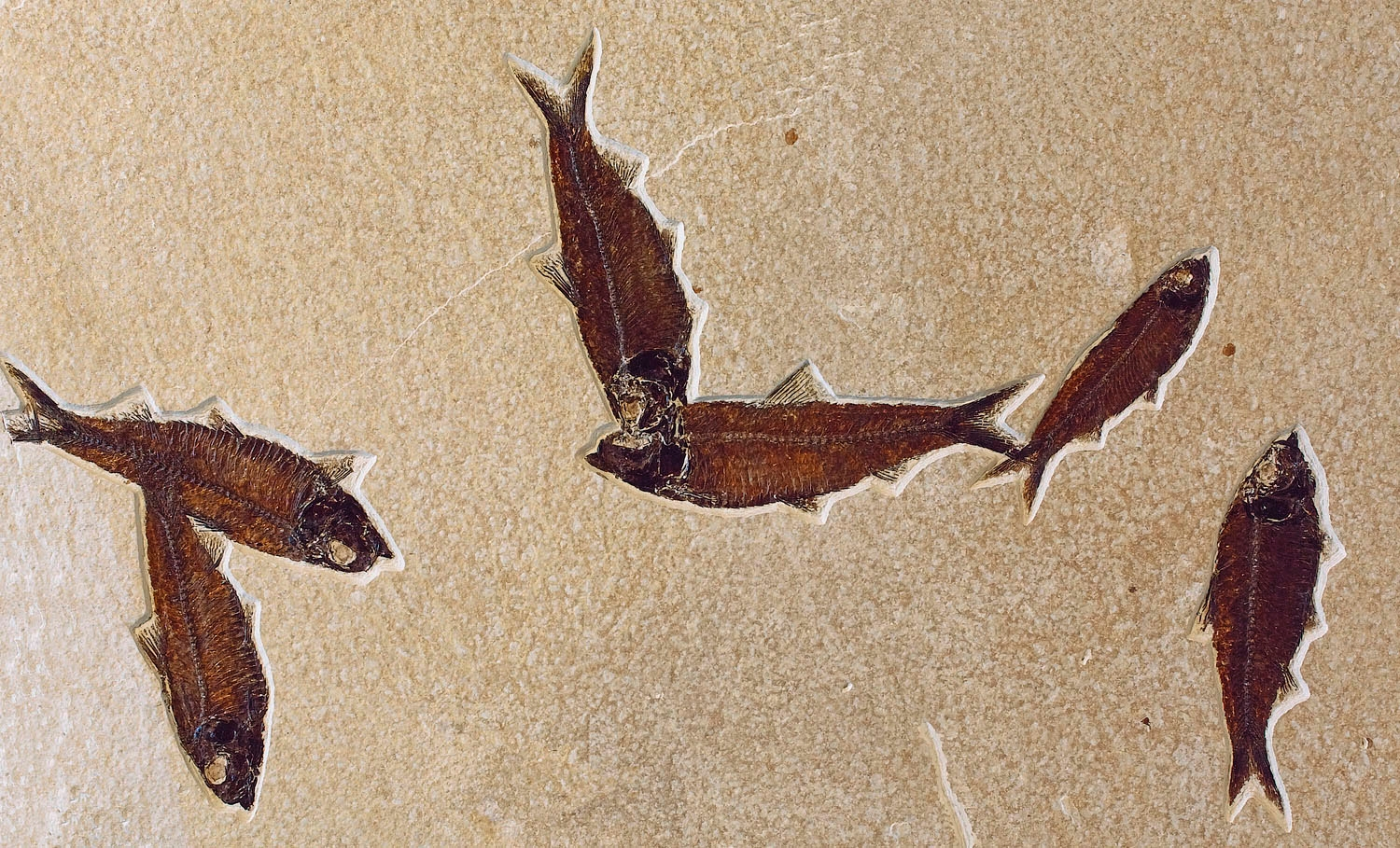
Slab of fossilized Knightia eocaena from Fossil Butte National Monument

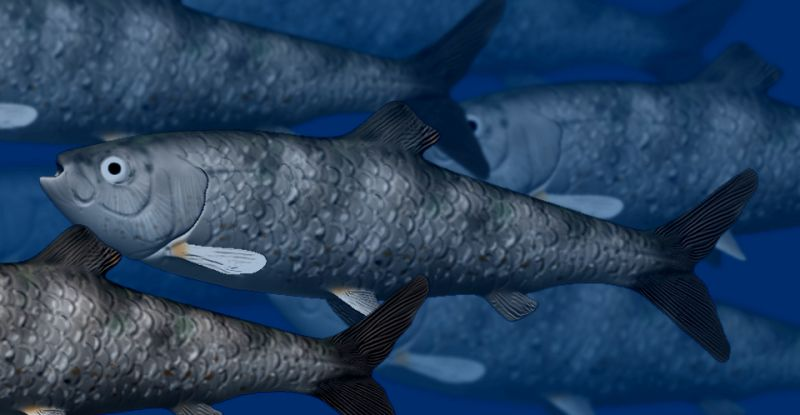
Digital artist's conception of Knightia sp.

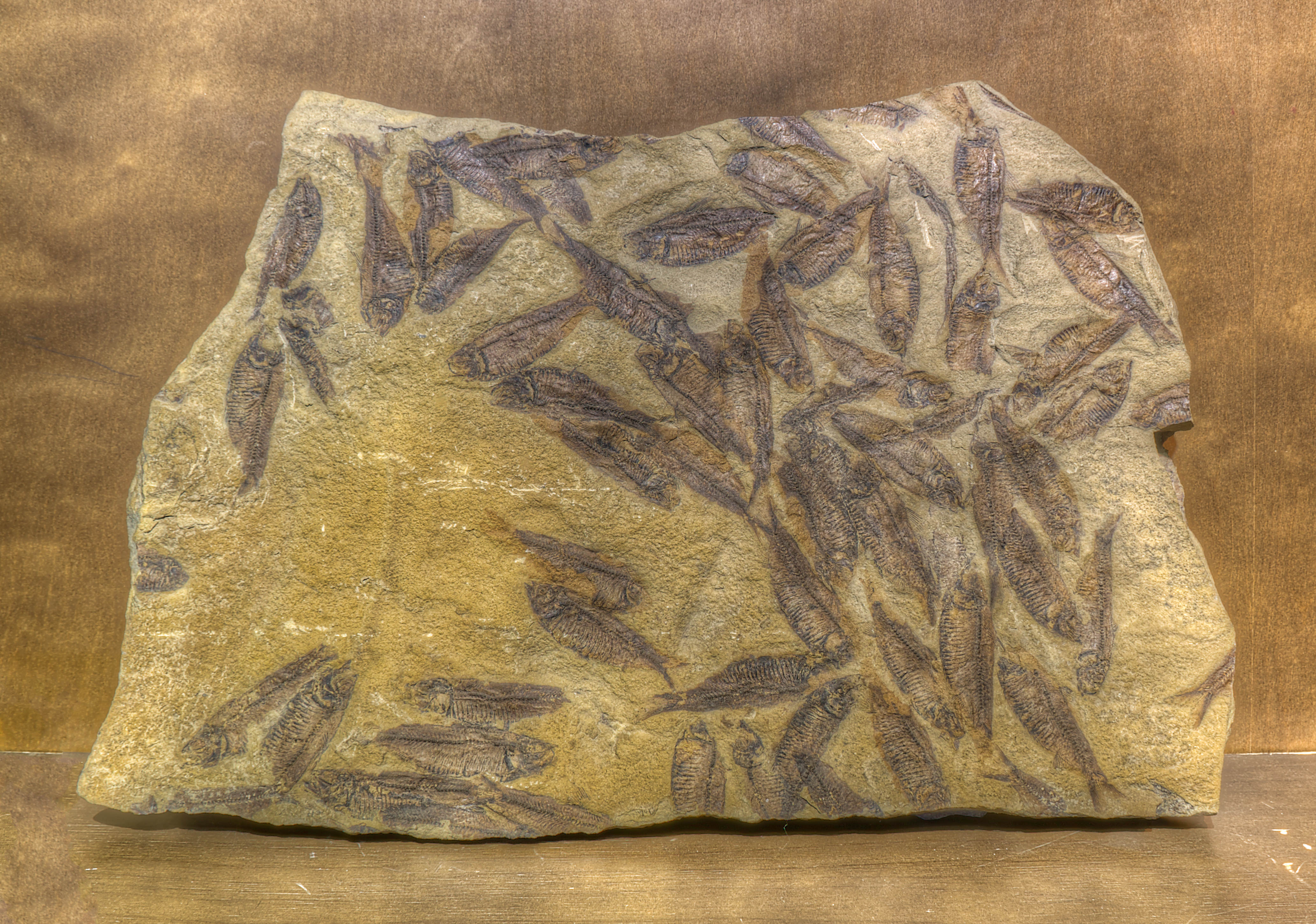
Knightia fossils from Green River Formation of Wyoming
