= Sprat =

Common name for several kinds of forage fish

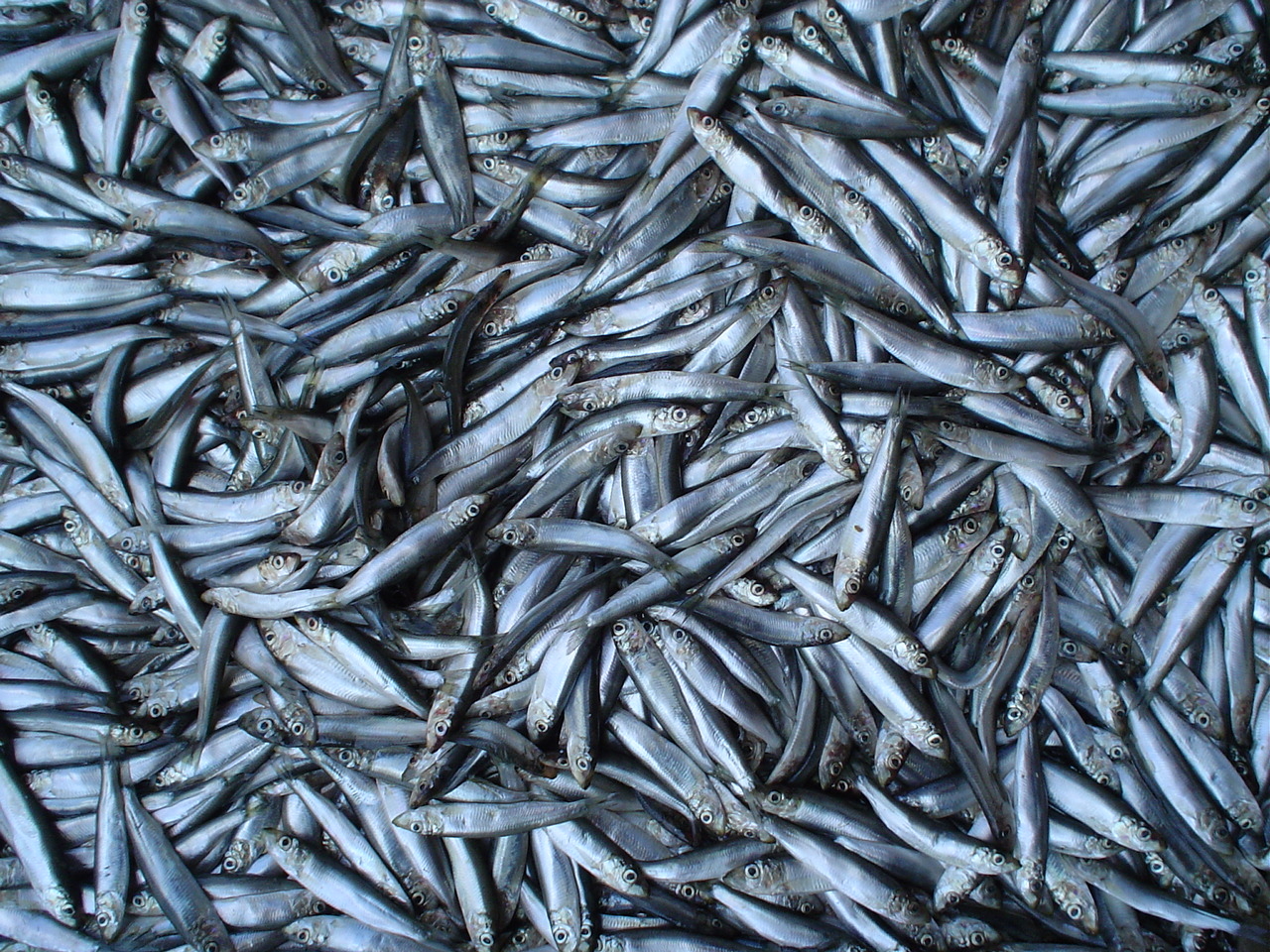
Salted sprats (Sprattus sprattus) at Odesa bazaar in Ukraine

Sprat is the common name applied to a group of forage fish belonging to the genus Sprattus in the family Clupeidae. The term also is applied to a number of other small sprat-like forage fish (Clupeoides, Clupeonella, Corica, Ehirava, Hyperlophus, Microthrissa, Nannothrissa, Platanichthys, Ramnogaster, Rhinosardinia, and Stolothrissa). Like most forage fishes, sprats are highly active, small, oily fish. They travel in large schools with other fish and swim continuously throughout the day.

They are recognized for their nutritional value, as they contain high levels of polyunsaturated fats, considered beneficial to the human diet. They are eaten in many places around the world. Sprats are often classed as sardines, which is a broad category. Sprats are sometimes passed off as other fish; products sold as having been prepared from anchovies (since the 19th century) sometimes are prepared from sprats, as the authentic ones once were less accessible.

== Species ==
=== True sprats ===
True sprats belong to the genus Sprattus in the family Clupeidae. The five species are:

Sprattus species
Common name	Scientific name	Maximum length	Common length	Maximum weight	Maximum age	Trophic level	Fish Base	FAO	ITIS	IUCN status
New Zealand blueback sprat	Sprattus antipodum (Hector 1872)	12.0 cm	9.0 cm			3.0				Least concern
Falkland sprat	Sprattus fuegensis (Blomefield, 1842)	18.0 cm	15.0 cm			3.4				Least concern
New Zealand sprat	Sprattus muelleri (Klunzinger, 1879)	13.0 cm	10.0 cm			3.0				Least concern
Australian sprat	Sprattus novaehollandiae (Valenciennes, 1847)	14.0 cm				3.0				Least concern
European sprat*	Sprattus sprattus (Linnaeus, 1758)	16.0 cm	12.0 cm		6 years	3.0				Least concern

* Type species

=== Other sprats ===
The term also is commonly applied to a number of other small sprat-like forage fish that share characteristics of the true sprat. Apart from the true sprats, FishBase lists another 48 species whose common names ends with "sprat". Some examples are:

Sprat-like species
Common name	Scientific name	Maximum length	Common length	Maximum weight	Maximum age	Trophic level	Fish Base	FAO	ITIS	IUCN status
Black Sea sprat	Clupeonella cultriventris (Nordmann, 1840)	14.5 cm	10 cm		5 years	3.0				Least concern

== Characteristics ==
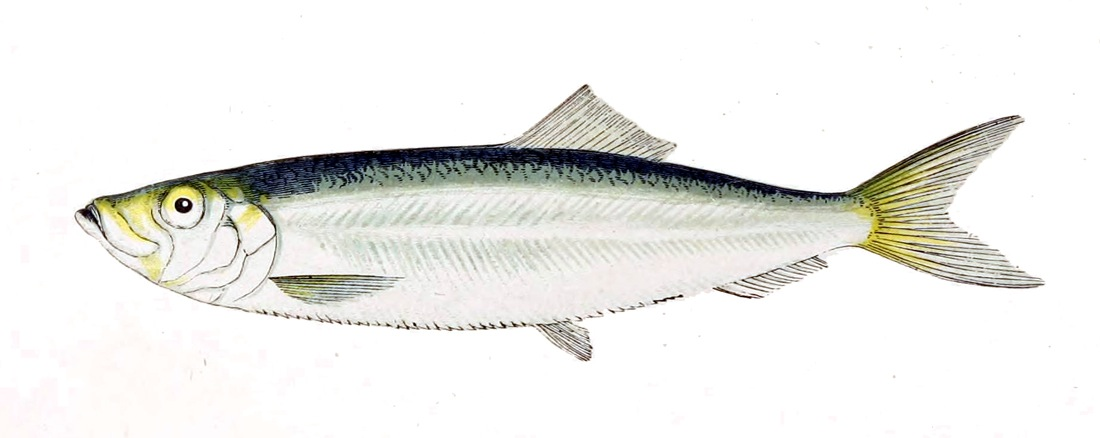
The European sprat, Sprattus sprattus, is the type species for the genus Sprattus.

The average length of time from fertilization to hatching is about 15 days, with environmental factors playing a major role in the size and overall success of the sprat. The development of young larval sprat and reproductive success of the sprat have been largely influenced by environmental factors. Some of these factors affecting the sprat can be seen in the Baltic Sea, where specific gravity, water temperature, depth, and other such factors play a role in their success.

In recent decades the number of sprat has fluctuated, due primarily to availability of zooplankton, a common food source, and also from overall changes in Clupeidae total abundance. Although the overall survival rates of the sprat decreased in the late 1980s and early 1990s, there has been a subsequent increase. Recent studies suggesting a progression in the reproductive success of the sprat acknowledge that a significant increase in spawning stock biomass occurred. One of the main concerns for reproductive success for the sprat include exceedingly cold winters, as cold temperatures, especially in the Baltic Sea, have been known to affect the development of sprat eggs and larvae.

The metabolic rate of the sprat is highly influenced by environmental factors such as water temperature. Several related fish, such as the Atlantic herring (C. harengus), have much lower metabolic rates than that of the sprat. Some of the difference may be due to size differences among the related species, but the most important reason for high levels of metabolism for the sprat is their exceedingly high level of activity throughout the day.

== Distribution ==
Fish of the different species of sprat are found in various parts of the world including New Zealand, Australia, and parts of Europe. By far, the most highly studied location where sprat, most commonly Sprattus sprattus, reside is the Baltic Sea in Northern Europe. The Baltic Sea provides the sprat with a highly diverse environment, with spatial and temporal potential allowing for successful reproduction.

One of the most well-known locations in the Baltic Sea where they forage for their food is the Bornholm Basin, in the southern portion of the Baltic Sea. Although the Baltic Sea has undergone several ecological changes during the last two decades, the sprat has dramatically increased in population. One of the environmental changes that has occurred in the Baltic Sea since the 1980s includes a decrease in water salinity, due to a lack of inflow from the North Sea that contains high saline and oxygen content.

== Ecology ==
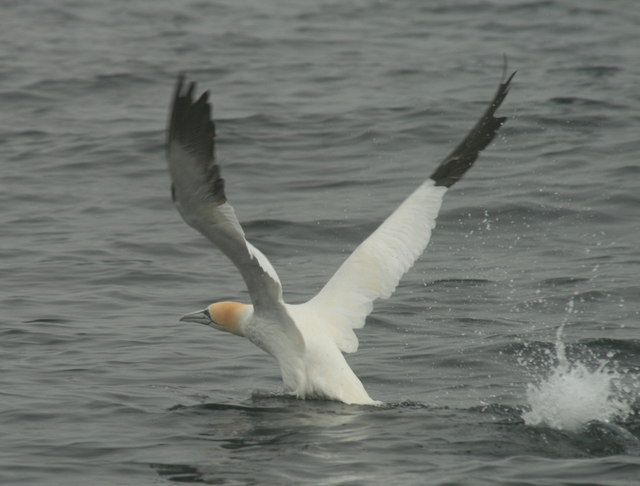
A gannet begins its takeoff run: Much "fuel" is needed for this huge bird to achieve take-off. Sprats and other forage fish that are abundant in the summer can provide this.

In the Baltic Sea, cod, herring, and sprat are considered the most important species. Cod is the top predator, while the herring and sprat primarily are recognized as prey. This has been proven by many studies that analyze the stomach contents of such fish, often finding contents that immediately signify predation among the species. Although cod primarily feed on adult sprat, sprat tend to feed on cod before the cod have been fully developed. The sprat tends to prey on the cod eggs and larvae.

The sprat and herring compete with each other for food. This is particularly evident in the vertical migration of the two species in the Baltic Sea, where they compete for the limited zooplankton available for their survival. Sprats are more selective in their diet than herring, and confine themselves to eating zooplankton. But they eat different species of zooplankton as temperature and other environment changes affect availability.

During autumn, sprats tend to have a diet high in Temora longicornis and Bosmina maritime. During the winter, their diet includes Pesudocalanus elongates. Pseudocalanus is genus of the order Calanoida and subclass Copepoda that is important to the predation and diet of fish in the Baltic Sea.

In both autumn and winter, a tendency exists for sprats to avoid eating Acartia spp., because they tend to be very small in size and have a high escape response to predators such as the herring and sprat. Although Acartia spp. may be present in large numbers, they also tend to dwell more toward the surface of the water, whereas the sprats, especially during the day, tend to dwell in deeper waters.

== Fisheries ==
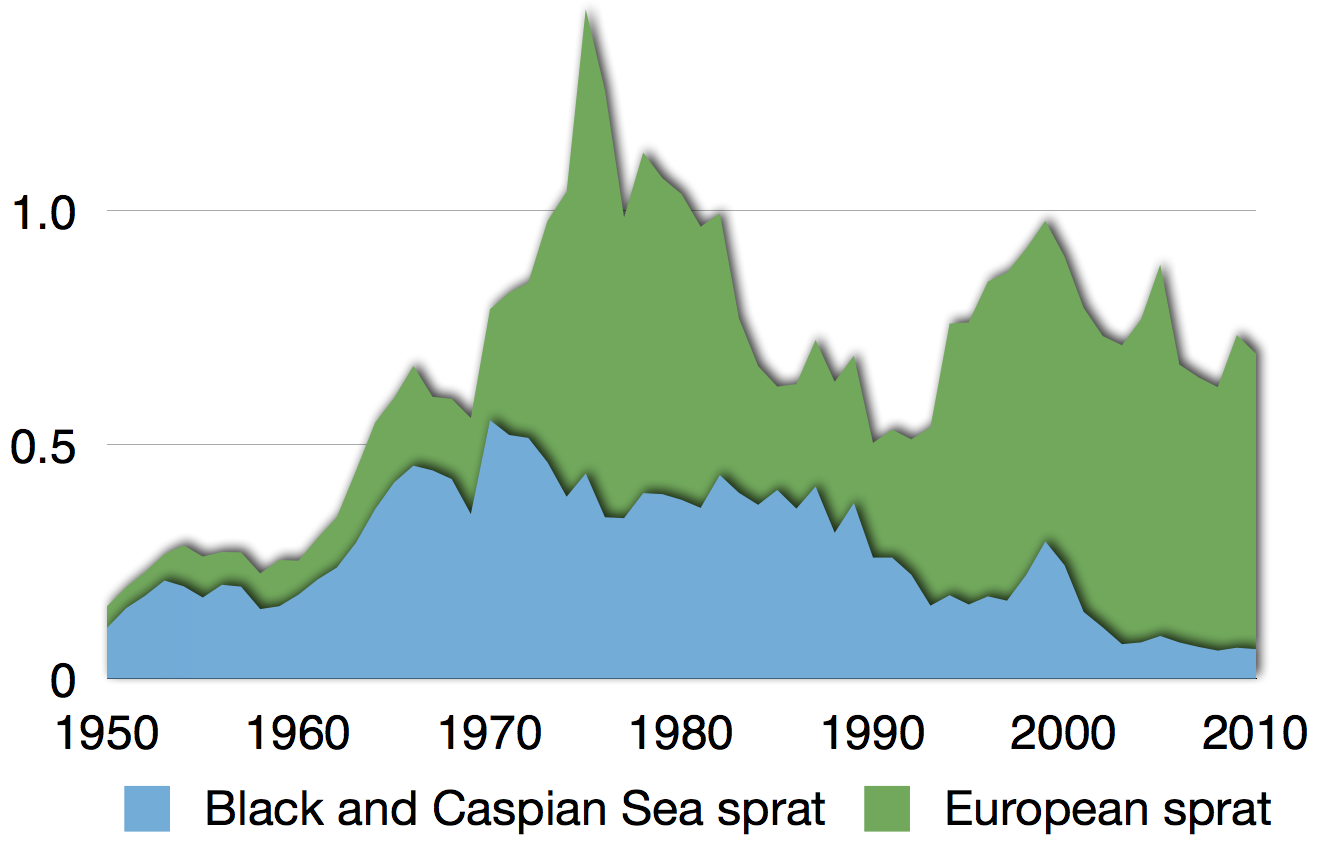
Global commercial capture of sprats in million tonnes 1950–2010

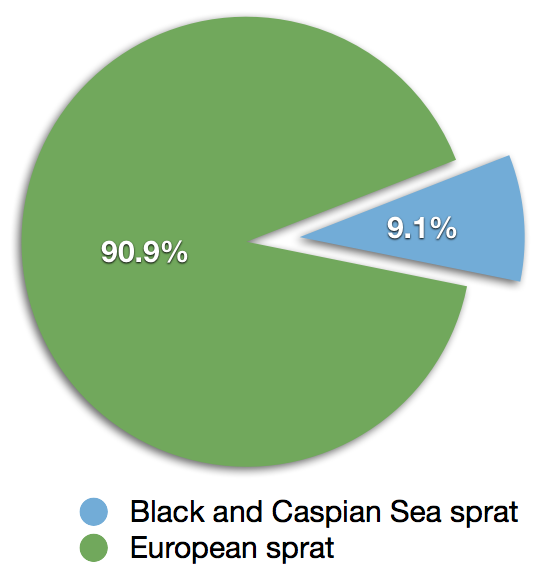
The total capture of sprats in 2010 reported by the FAO was 667,000 tonnes.

== As food ==
In Northern Europe, European sprats are commonly smoked and preserved in oil, which retains a strong, smoky flavor.

Sprat, if smoked, is considered to be one of the foods highest in purine content.

Sprats contain long-chain polyunsaturated fatty acids, including eicosapentaenoic acid (EPA) and docosahexaenoic acid (DHA). They are present in amounts comparable to Atlantic salmon, and up to seven times higher in EPA and DHA than common fresh fillets of gilt-head bream. The sprats contain about 1.43 g/100 g of these polyunsaturated fatty acids that have been found to help prevent mental, neural, and cardiovascular diseases.

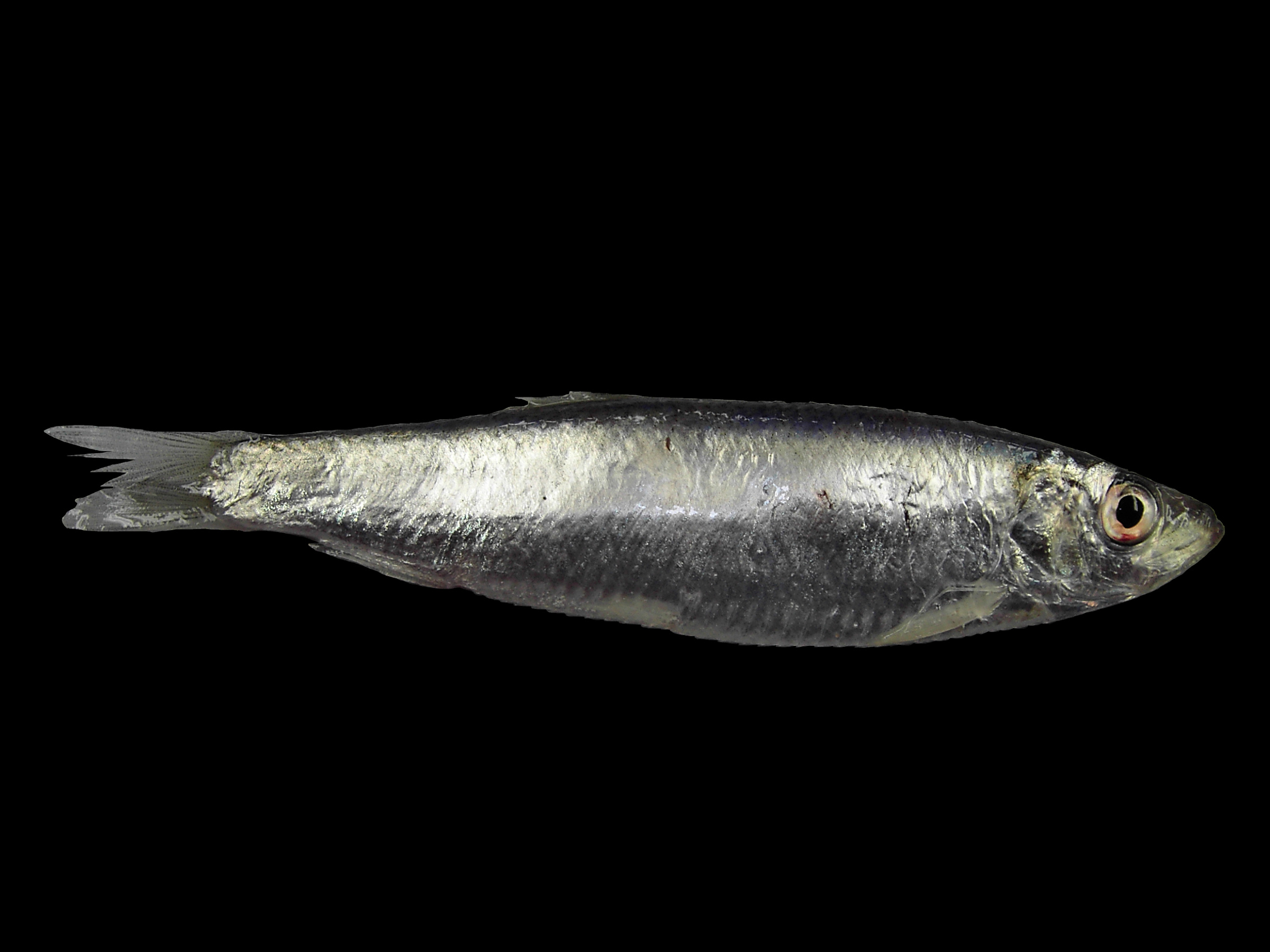
Sprattus sprattus, the European sprat

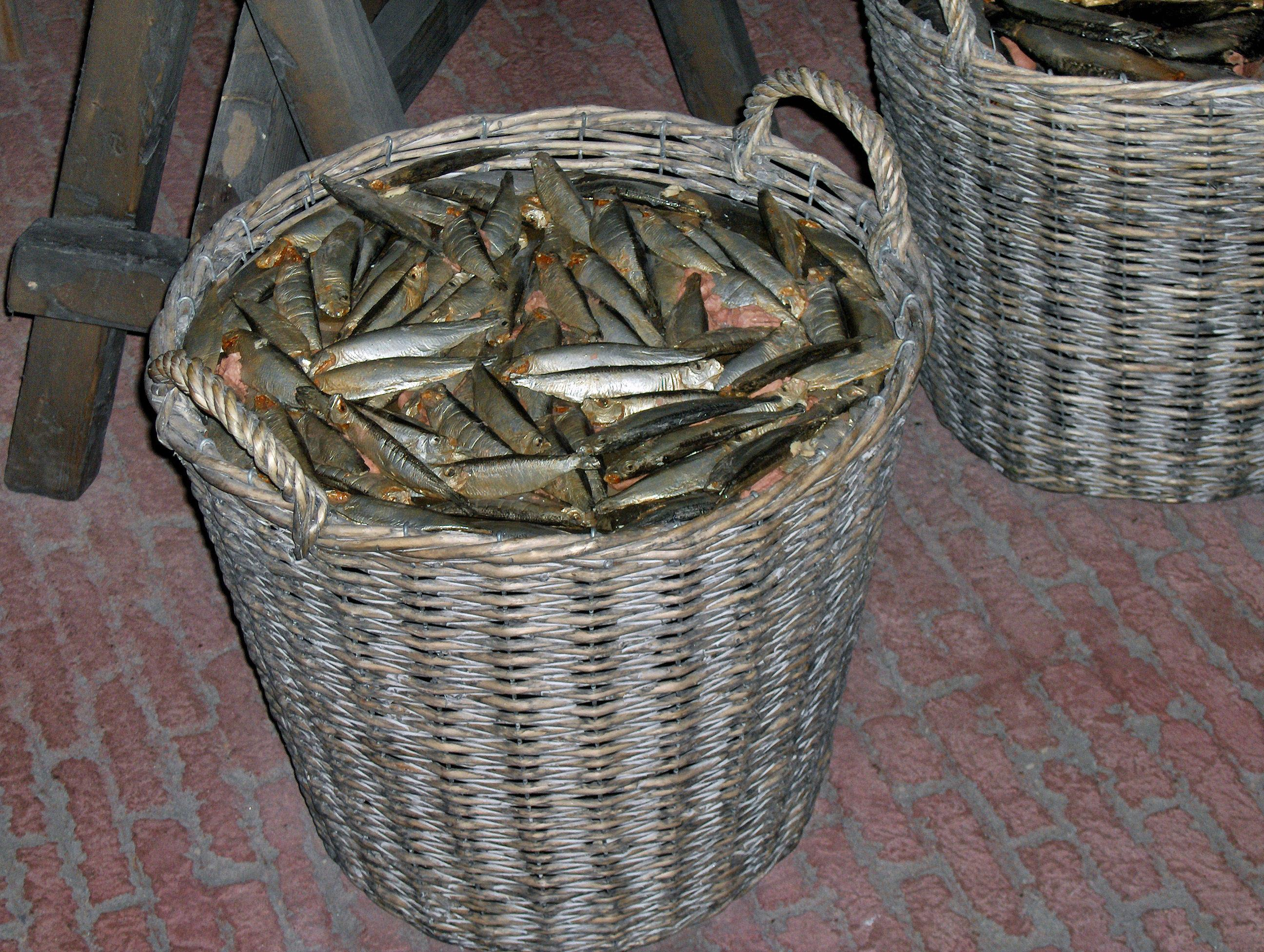
Creel with sprat, National Fishery Museum, Belgium

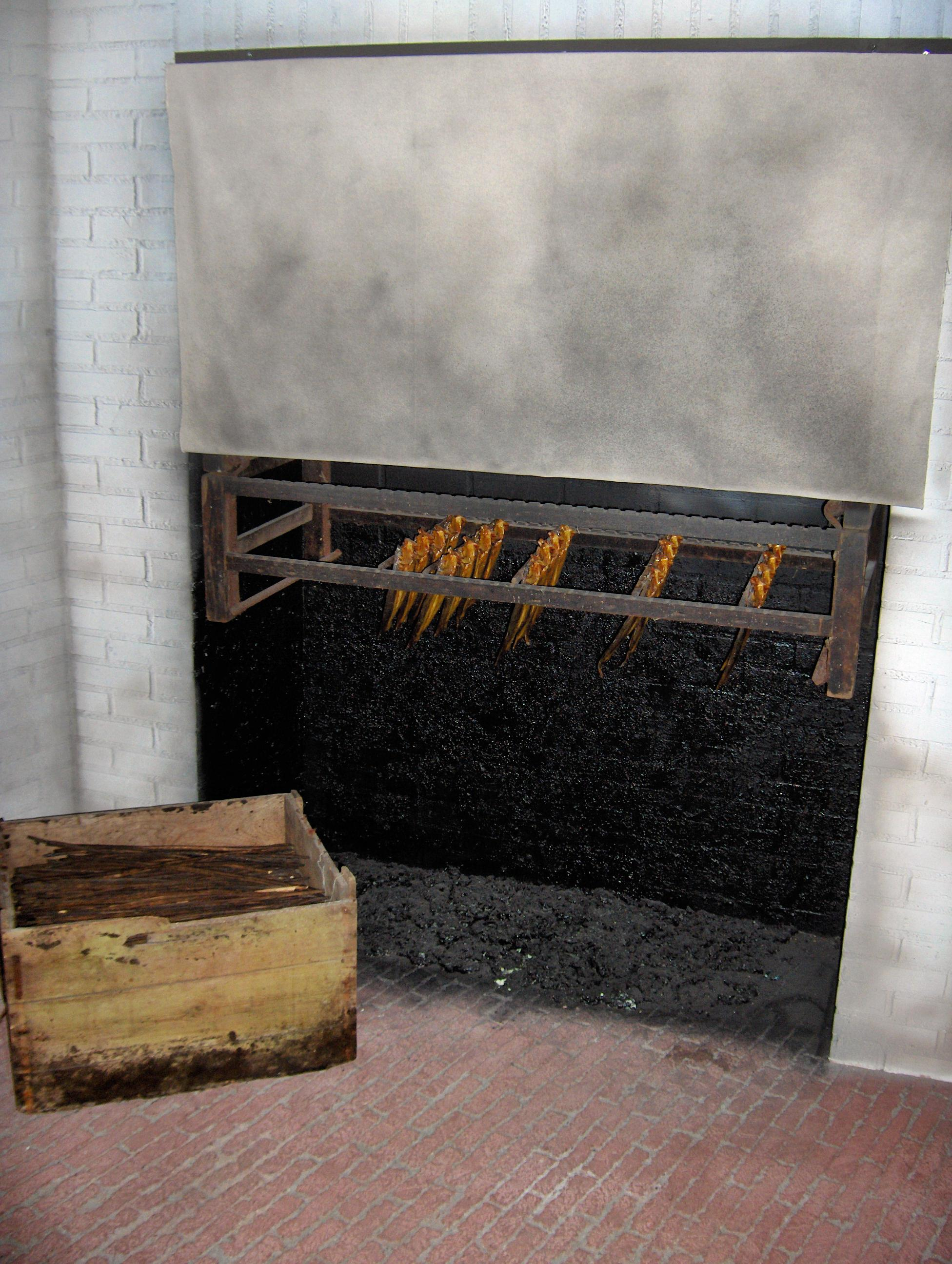
Oven for smoking sprat, National Fishery Museum, Belgium
