= University of Wyoming tyrannosaurus statue =

Tyrannosaurus statue in Laramie, Wyoming, U.S.

Tyrannosaurus Sculpture
- Location: University of Wyoming Geological Museum, Laramie, Wyoming, U.S.
- Designer: Samuel H. Knight
- Type: Sculpture
- Material: Hand-hammered copper shell with welded steel support rods
- Length: 45 feet
- Beginning date: 1964 (assembly and erection)
- Completion date: 1964

Tyrannosaurus rex Statue standing in front of the University of Wyoming Geological Museum

The University of Wyoming Geological Museum features a 45-foot-long Tyrannosaurus sculpture created by Samuel H. Knight. The sculpture was assembled and erected in front of the museum in 1964. Knight spent over 4,000 hours assembling the sculpture. The statue celebrated its 50th anniversary in 2014, which was documented by the Wyoming Public Radio. The University of Wyoming Geology Museum hosted two birthday parties for the statue to celebrate the occasion. One on Friday, April 11th, and the other on Saturday, April 12th.

== Folklore ==
Around finals every year, students from all over campus will throw pinecones into the sculpture's mouth. If a pinecone successfully lands in the Tyrannosarus' mouth, it is believed you will pass your finals that year. The trend has exceeded the student demographic, and people from all walks of life try to land a pinecone in the sculpture's jaws successfully. This lore is often explained on campus tours and during the university's Saddle Up Orientation when touring around the Geological Museum. The statue has quickly become a beloved landmark on the University of Wyoming campus and in Laramie, Wyoming.

== Construction ==
The Tyrannosaurus sculpture was created with welded steel support rods alongside a hand-hammered copper shell. Pieces such as the body, head, and legs were made separately. It was assembled on-site in 1964. This hammer technique created the sculpture's scaly texture. The sculpture was a passion project, and Samuel H. Knight built the statue singlehandedly for the Geological Museum.
