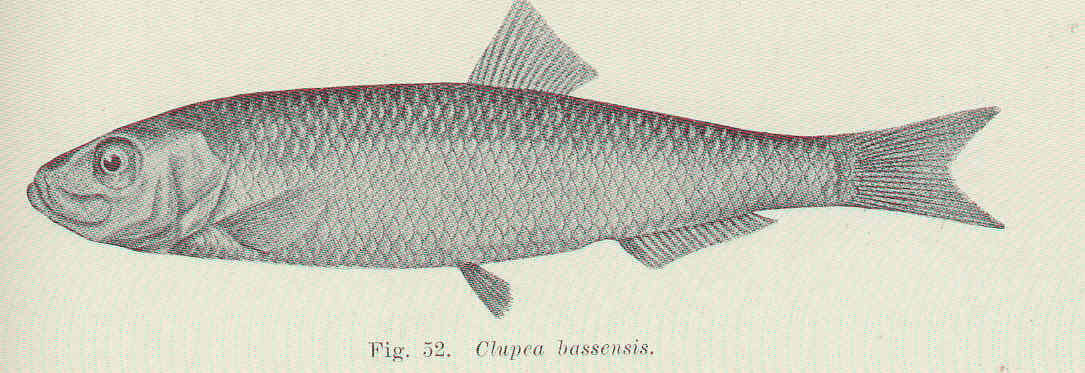

Conservation status
- Least Concern (IUCN 3.1)

Scientific classification
- Kingdom: Animalia
- Phylum: Chordata
- Class: Actinopterygii
- Division: Teleostei
- Order: Clupeiformes
- Family: Clupeidae
- Genus: Sprattus
- Species: S. novaehollandiae

Binomial name
- Sprattus novaehollandiae (Valenciennes in Cuvier and Valenciennes, 1847)

= Australian sprat =

Species of fish

The Australian sprat (Sprattus novaehollandiae) is a sprat fish whose habitat ranges in the waters surrounding Australia including Tasmania. It is a pelagic fish which is found in anti-tropical, temperate water. It is a part of the Clupeidae family. Other members of the Cluepeidae family also include herring, menhaden, sardines as well as shads. It is currently a relative unknown species of Sprat compared to the other members of the family. In total, there are five different types of True Sprats. What makes Australian Sprats different from the rest is their location and appearance. Sprattus Novaehollandiae have a dark blue back and a protruding lower jaw. They are found in the Southern regions of Australian such as lower Victoria and Tasmania were there are colder climates. On average, Australian Sprat grown up to 14 cm and live in the range of 0–50 meters deep in the ocean. They will lay between 10,000 and 40,000 eggs per year and live for approximately 5–7 years. Other names for the Australian Sprat include Clupea Bassensis and Meletta Novaehollandiae.

== Biology ==
In terms of appearance, Australian Sprats resemble herrings with their elongated body and silver colouration. Interestingly, Sprats vary in size depending on the specific species, with the Australian Sprat being 14 cm long. Specifically, the Australian Sprat has the following fin configuration. 15-18 Anal fin 18-21: Caudal fin 19: Pectoral fin 17-18: Pelvic fin 8; Oblique scale rows on side 44. The Australian Sprat has a relatively shallow body giving it an elongated and compressed look with a narrow caudal peduncle. They also have a smaller head (25-29% SL) with medium-sized eyes (27-33% HL). Along its anterior and posterior edges of the eye, it has strips of transparent adipose tissue. Finally, Australian Sprat have a slightly projecting lower jaw with miniature or no teeth. The scales on the Australian Sprat are large, cycloid and minimally attached. They cover most of the body except the head.

== Etymology ==
The name Novaehollandiae means New Holland which is the old name used for Australia. The further breakdown of the etymology of the Australian Sprat will be broken down in table form.

== Habitat ==
Overall, this specific Sprat is found in a wide range of ecosystems. The Australian Sprat is commonly found during the seasonal period of August–November in Tasmania. The Australian Sprat is considered a coastal, marine, estuarine and pelagic species. In coastal regions, they form schools located mostly in deep bays and estuaries. An estuary is a body of water where the river and the ocean meet. It is where freshwater is drained from the land into the seawater. Estuaries are considered one of the most productive ecosystems in the world being a reason why Australian Sprat are found in this location. On the other hand, an abundant level of Australian Sprat are found in bays during the season of August to November. A bay is a body of water surrounded partially by land. Specifically, during the day, sprats will move into deeper water and migrate to shallow regions to source food.

Unlike the other Sprats, Australian sprats are found around the colder regions of Australia. They are in both the Indian and Pacific Ocean. More specifically, this ranges from Port Jackson in New South Wales and down to Tasmania. Although less common, Australian Sprat have been spotted as far as the Spencer Gulf in South Australia as well as in New Zealand Waters. Overall, there is minimal data on the species. Not much is known abouts the total population size, history, and biology.

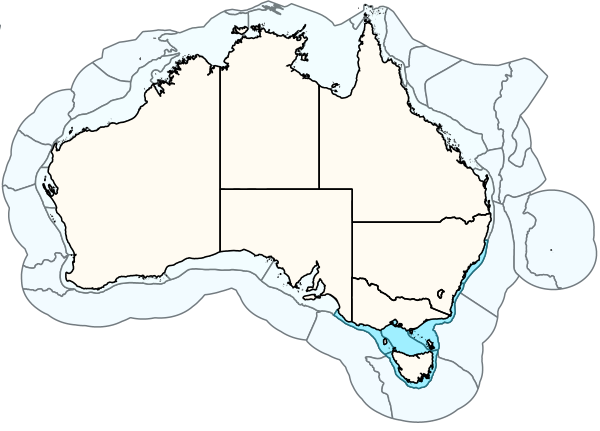
Showing extent of where Australian Sprats are located

The Australian Sprat is a pelagic fish which is found in antitropical, temperate water. An antitropical distribution occurs when similar species of the same animal are distributed on both the North and South of the tropics yet not within. Interestingly, this antitropical distribution pattern is found for all five species of Sprat. These tropical zones act as a barrier to entry of the Sprattus which limits the dispersion of the Sprattus around the world. Note that only the Sprattus Sprattus is found in the Northern Hemisphere around the coast of Europe while three out of the five species of Sprats are found within the oceania region. For the Sprattus to spread from the Northern to the Southern Hemisphere of vice versa, it is considered a possibility that it occurred during the Miocene and Pliocene period, as it allowed for a window of opportunity for the Sprattus to migrate to the other hemisphere. There have been no studies which examine the origins of the Sprattus, yet species with similar antitropical distribution have been examined extensively. These include Sardinops.

== Conservation ==
From a conservation perspective, the Australian Sprat is not a targeted species from fisheries which means there are no major threats and potential impacts to the species. However, more research as well as consistent monitoring is required to ensure this risk evaluation is correct. However, currently the Australian Sprat is of least concern. The International Union for Conservation of Nature cannot identify whether the population is increasing or decreasing.

== Predatory and prey ==
Although Australian Sprat are of least concern in terms of conservation. They are still prey of some animals. They are the known prey of little penguins (Eudyptula minor) as well the Australian Pied Cormorant (Phalacrocorax varius). Also, the Australian Sprat is a part of the seabird food chain.

Further, all Sprattus types are prey of the New Zealand fur seal (Arctocephalus forsteri). In terms of being a predator, the Australian Sprat is not a predator of any animal. However, it feeds on copepods and plankton.

Finally, the Australian Sprats diet remains unchanged throughout their lifetime. Both when they are young as well as adults, Sprats feed on zooplankton. Other animals that they prey include fish eggs, fish larvae, copepods as well as plankton.

== Taxonomy ==
Taxonomy
Class	Scientific name
Kingdom	Animalia
Subkingdom	Bilateria
Infrakingdom	Deuterostomnia
Phylum	Chordata
Subphylum	Vertebrata
Infraphylum	Gnathostomata
Superclass	Actinopterygii
Class	Teleostei
Superorder	Clupeomorpha
Order	Clupeiformes
Suborder	Clupeoidei
Family	Clupeidae
Subfamily	Clupeinae
Genus	Sprattus
Species	Sprattus Novaehollandiae

Note that Australian Sprat samples have been impossible to obtain regarding taxon sampling.

== Cooking and food ==
Note there is minimal human interaction and Sprats for a variety of reason. However, humans use Sprats to create fishmeal or for their own personal consumption. The Australian Sprat is a small oily fish which possesses an abundance of nutrients. In terms of seafood, it is considered one of the most nutritious varieties. To be preserved, it is smoked and then placed into a can of either oil or brine. Many people enjoy the smoky flavour and will use the sprat is a variety of different dishes and cuisines.

There are many ways which sprats can be cooked and consumed. Sprats can be cooked in the pan with salt, pepper, and lemon juice on toast. Another option is having a whole sprat on toast with egg is also a good meal. Finally, Sprats can also be placed into a stew depending upon the season. Overall, the sprat can be eaten either fresh, fry, broil, grill, bake, smoke or salted.

The following are a list of nutrition facts for sprats per 100 grams.

Nutrition
Name	Amount	% of daily intake
Calories	157 kcal	7.9%
Carbohydrates	0g	0.0%
Fibre	0g	0.0%
Sugar	0g	0.0%
Fat	6.53g	10.0%
Saturated Fat	1.47g	7.4%
Monounsaturated	2.7g	n/a
Polyunsaturated	1.54g	n/a
Omega-3	1.38g	n/a
Omega-6	0.14g	n/a
Protein	23.03g	46.1%

Vitamins and minerals
Name	% of daily intake
Vitamin B12	548
Niacin (B3)	26
Riboflavin (B2)	23
Vitamin B6	21
Vitamin D	15
Pantothenic acid (B5)	15
Choline	15
Thiamin (B1)	9
Vitamin E	5
Folate	3
Vitamin A	2
Vitamin C	1
Selenium	85
Phosphorus	24
Zinc	12
Magnesium	10
Potassium	9
Copper	13
Iron	8
Calcium	6
Sodium	5
Manganese	2

Australian sprat has large amounts of Omega-3. The Omega-3 comes in two forms, EPA (Eicosapentaenoic acid) and DHA (Docosahexaenoic acid) which are both the most bio-available form of Omega-3. Omega-3 is considered an essential fatty acid for a healthy diet.

Omega-3 positively impacts the body through its anti-inflammatory benefits. It also helps the cardiovascular system, whilst lowering blood pressure and triglyceride levels. Australian Sprat are also a great source of Vitamin D with 100g of Sprat being 15% of recommended daily intake. Vitamin D benefits the body by protecting the immune, nervous and skeletal system. It is also a source of Vitamin B12 which plays in energy production as well as DNA and red bloody cell production.

One of the main problems with consuming too many large fish is the high mercury content which they have. The Australian Sprat is low in the food chain compared to larger animals which means that they don't accumulate much mercury through their diet. Other larger fish in the food chain eat a collection of smaller fish which contain small amount of mercury individually which can collectively become an issue. Studies have shown that mercury content in sprats are low. The issue of adding sprats to your diet is the purine content. The purine content is sprats is high. Too much purine can affect the body due to the breakdown of purine in uric acid in the body.

== Reproduction and threats to reproduction ==
The Australian Sprat takes approximately 15 days from fertilisation to hatching. The process of reproduction and breeding for a sprat is via spawning. This is the process where eggs are fertilised outside of the body. The female sprats release their eggs into the warm water and the male releases sperm to fertilise them. Some of the long terms threats to reproduction include climate change, over-fishing and pollution.
