= Freshwater herring =

"Freshwater herring" is a term applied to a wide variety of freshwater fish which resemble herring:

- Clupeoides papuensis, toothed river herring
- Coregonus albula, vendace
- Potamalosa richmondia, Australian freshwater herring
- Salvelinus grayi, the Lough Melvin charr
- Sardinella tawilis, the bombon sardine
