= Samuel Howell Knight =

American geologist and professor (1892-1975)

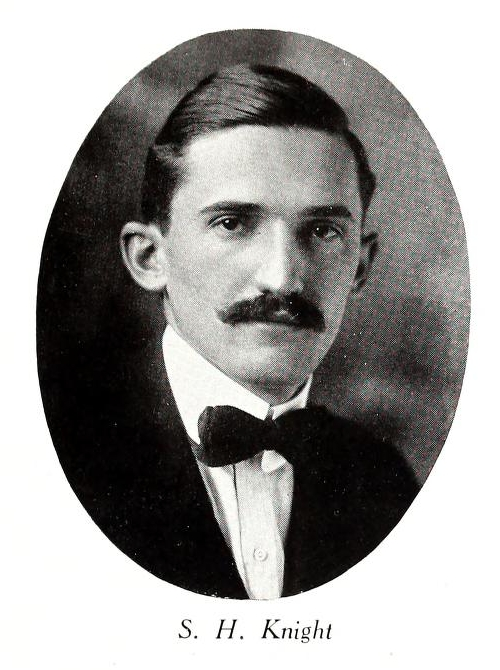
Doc Knight c. 1921

Samuel Howell "Doc" Knight (31 July 1892 – 1 February 1975) was an American geologist who taught at the University of Wyoming and also served as a state geologist from 1933 to 1941. Known as "Doc" Knight, he was an influential teacher, noted for his use of multi-colour chalk illustrations to teach geology over a span of fifty years.

== Life and work ==
Knight was born to Wilbur Clinton Knight and Emma Howell who had both studied at the University of Nebraska. Wilbur took up a position as a mining engineer at Florence, Keystone, west of Laramie and later became a state geologist. His mother was a county superintendent of schools. At a young age Knight was introduced to geology, and collected fossils with Professor William Reed, curator of the University of Wyoming museum. His father was also a keen fossil hunter, collecting 70 tons of material for the collections and is credited with the production of the first geology map of Wyoming. The fossil Knightia was named in honour of Wilbur Clinton Knight. The After schooling at Laramie, he went to the University of Wyoming, graduating in 1913. He then joined Columbia University where he studied under A. W. Grabau and D.W. Johnson, receiving a PhD in 1916. He then became an assistant professor of geology. In 1917 he was recruited into World War I for studying the terrain in Europe for military requirements. A skilled artist and designer, he was involved in making a life-size cast of Tyrannosaurus rex. In 1933 he served as State Geologist for Wyoming. Knight also conducted outdoors science camps in geology at the Medicine Bow Mountains west of Laramie.

Knight married his fellow student from Columbia, Edwina Hall, in 1916 and they had two children. Knight died at Laramie and is buried at Greenhill Cemetery.
