= Sprattus =

- European sprat, Sprattus sprattus sprattus

Scientific classification
- Kingdom: Animalia
- Phylum: Chordata
- Class: Actinopterygii
- Division: Teleostei
- Order: Clupeiformes
- Family: Clupeidae
- Genus: Sprattus; Girgensohn, 1846

Type species
- Sprattus haleciformis Girgensohn, 1846

Synonyms
- Antu de Buen, 1958; Maugeclupea Whitley, 1932; Meletta Valenciennes, 1847; Spratella Valenciennes, 1847

Genus of fishes

Sprattus is a genus of small oily fish of the family Clupeidae. They are more usually known by their common name, sprats. There are five species in the genus.

== Species ==
- Sprattus antipodum (Hector, 1872) (New Zealand blueback sprat)
- Sprattus fuegensis (Jenyns, 1842) (Fueguian sprat)
- Sprattus muelleri (Klunzinger, 1879) (New Zealand sprat)
- Sprattus novaehollandiae (Valenciennes, 1847) (Australian sprat)
- Sprattus sprattus (Linnaeus, 1758) (European sprat)
  - The most common species of sprat discussed in research is Sprattus sprattus, mostly because of its prevalence in the Baltic Sea.
