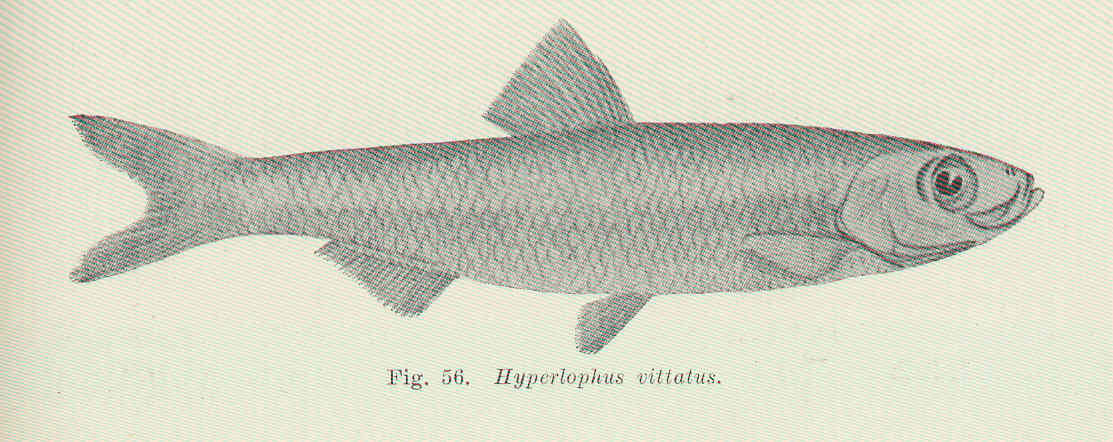

Conservation status
- Least Concern (IUCN 3.1)

Scientific classification
- Kingdom: Animalia
- Phylum: Chordata
- Class: Actinopterygii
- Division: Teleostei
- Order: Clupeiformes
- Family: Hyperlophidae
- Genus: Hyperlophus
- Species: H. vittatus

Binomial name
- Hyperlophus vittatus (Castelnau, 1875)

Synonyms
- Meletta vittata Castelnau, 1875

= Sandy sprat =

Species of fish

The sandy sprat, Hyperlophus vittatus, also known as the glassies, glassy, white pilchard, or whitebait, is a type of sprat fish.
