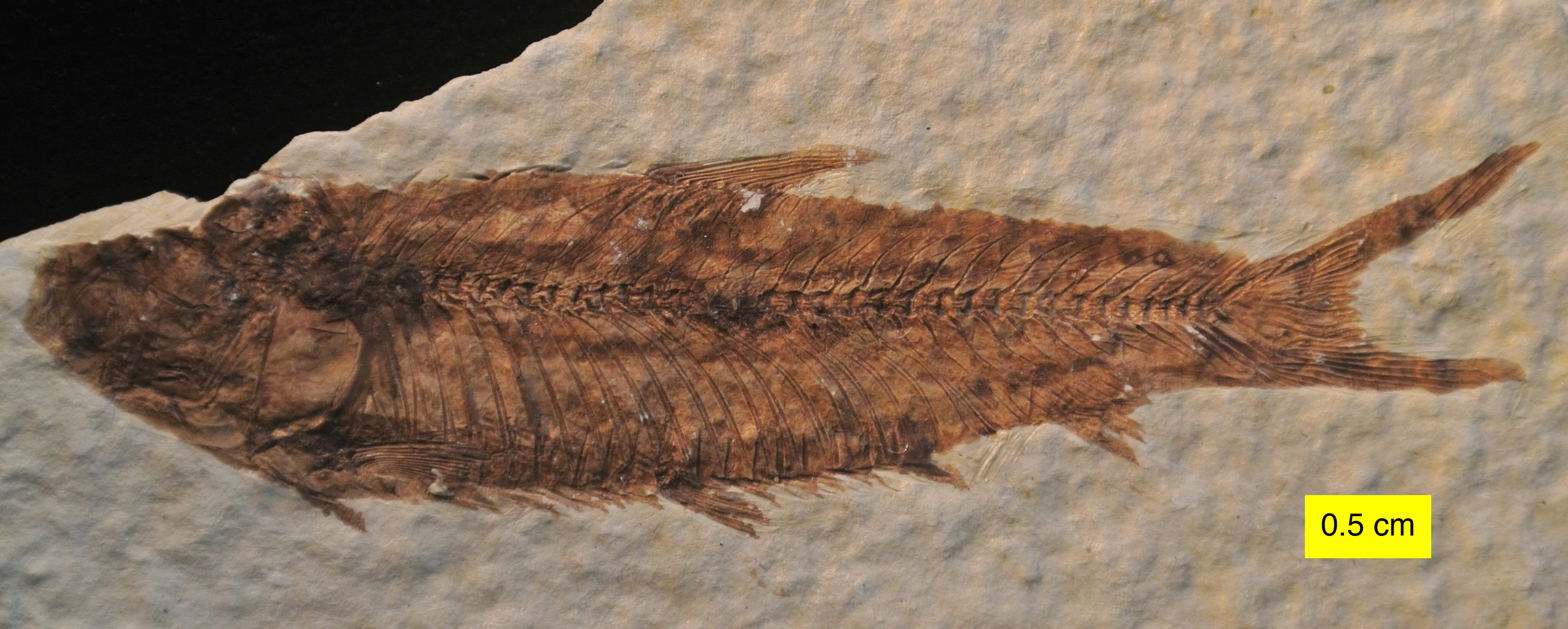
- Specimen of Knightia

Scientific classification
- Kingdom: Animalia
- Phylum: Chordata
- Class: Actinopterygii
- Division: Teleostei
- Order: Clupeiformes
- Suborder: Clupeoidei
- Family: Hyperlophidae; Ogilby, 1897

Species
- Hyperlophus; Potamalosa; †Knightia; †Gosiutichthys

= Hyperlophidae =

Hyperlophidae Temporal range: Middle Paleocene–present
- Hyperlophus vittatus

Family of fishes

Hyperlophidae, also known as double-armored freshwater herrings (not to be confused with the extinct double-armored herrings, Ellimmichthyiformes) is a small family of clupeiform fish. It comprises only two extant genera, both found in freshwater and marine habitats of Australia, but fossil evidence also suggests that they inhabited North America and Asia during the Paleogene.

The following extant genera are placed in this family:

- Hyperlophus Ogilby, 1892
- Potamalosa Ogilby, 1897

In addition, the following fossil genera are also known:

- †Knightia Jordan, 1907 (Middle Paleocene of Montana, US, Early Eocene of Wyoming, US, Middle Eocene of Shandong, China)
- †Gosiutichthys Grande, 1982 (Early Eocene of Wyoming, US)

The genus †Vectichthys Gaudant & Quayle, 1988 from the Late Eocene of England has also been noted to share close morphological similarities with Hyperlophus and Knightia, although it has not been reclassified into the family yet.

The close morphological similarities between the famous fossil herring Knightia and the modern Australian Hyperlophus & Potamalosa have long been noted, with both sharing complete scutation on the dorsal surface. In the 1980s, these genera were placed in the subfamily Pellonulinae, now known to be paraphyletic as originally defined. In the 2010s, following major taxonomic revisions, Knightia was found to be of uncertain classification, while the two extant genera were found to be closely related to the true herrings of Clupea, and thus placed in the family Clupeidae. However, in a 2026 taxonomic revision incorporating both phylogenetics and fossil calibrations, the Potamalosa + Hyperlophus clade was found to shift into a more basal position when Knightia was included within it, suggesting that a lack of fossil calibration may have skewed the previous findings about these genera belonging to the Clupeidae. For this reason, the family Hyperlophidae (originally described as a subfamily for the Australian herrings) was revived to include all these taxa.
