= Wilbur Clinton Knight =

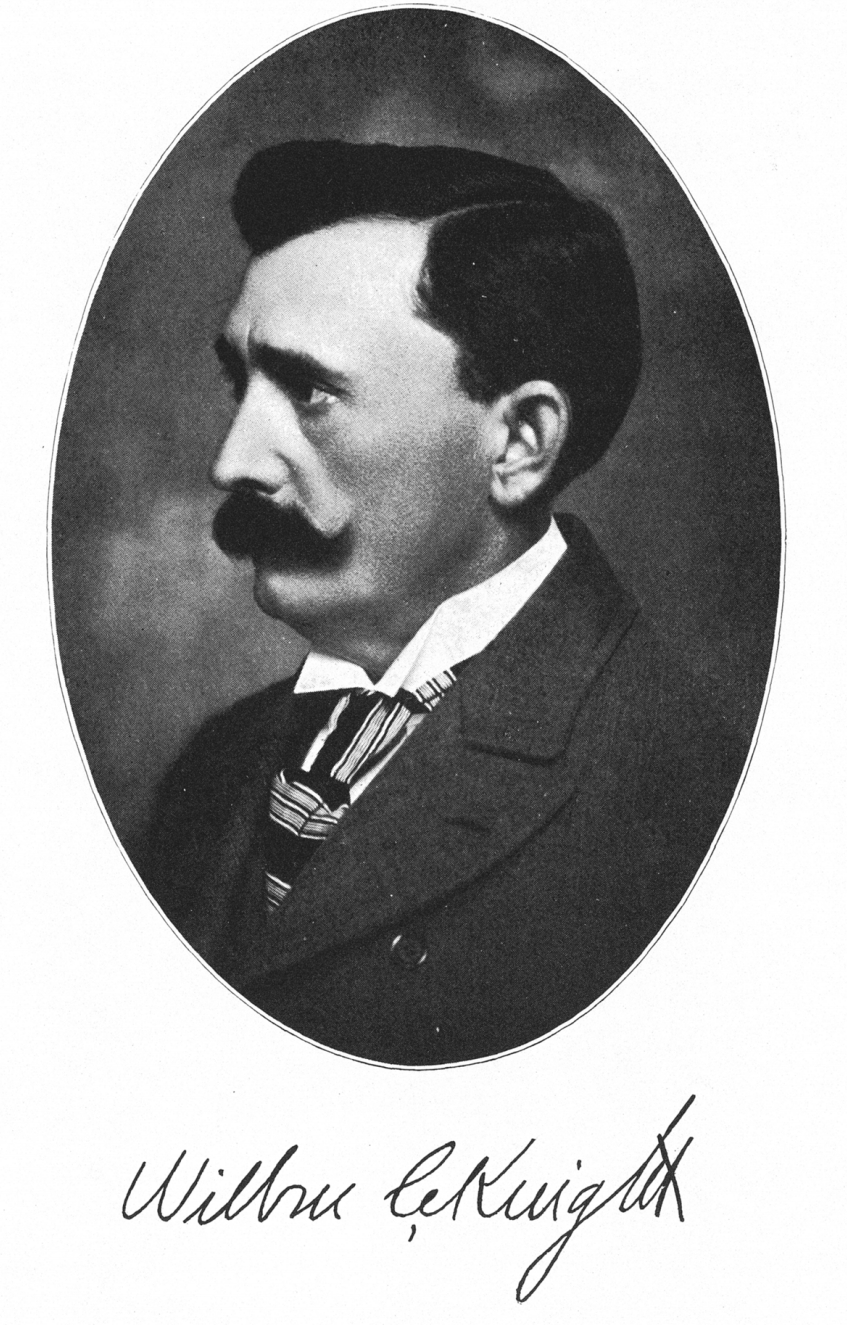

Wilbur Clinton Knight (13 December 1858 – 28 July 1903) was a geologist and founding professor of geology at the University of Wyoming. He also served as state geologist for Wyoming and produced some of the earliest geological maps of the region. His son Samuel Howell Knight also became a geologist of repute. The genus Knightia is named in his honor.

== Life and work ==
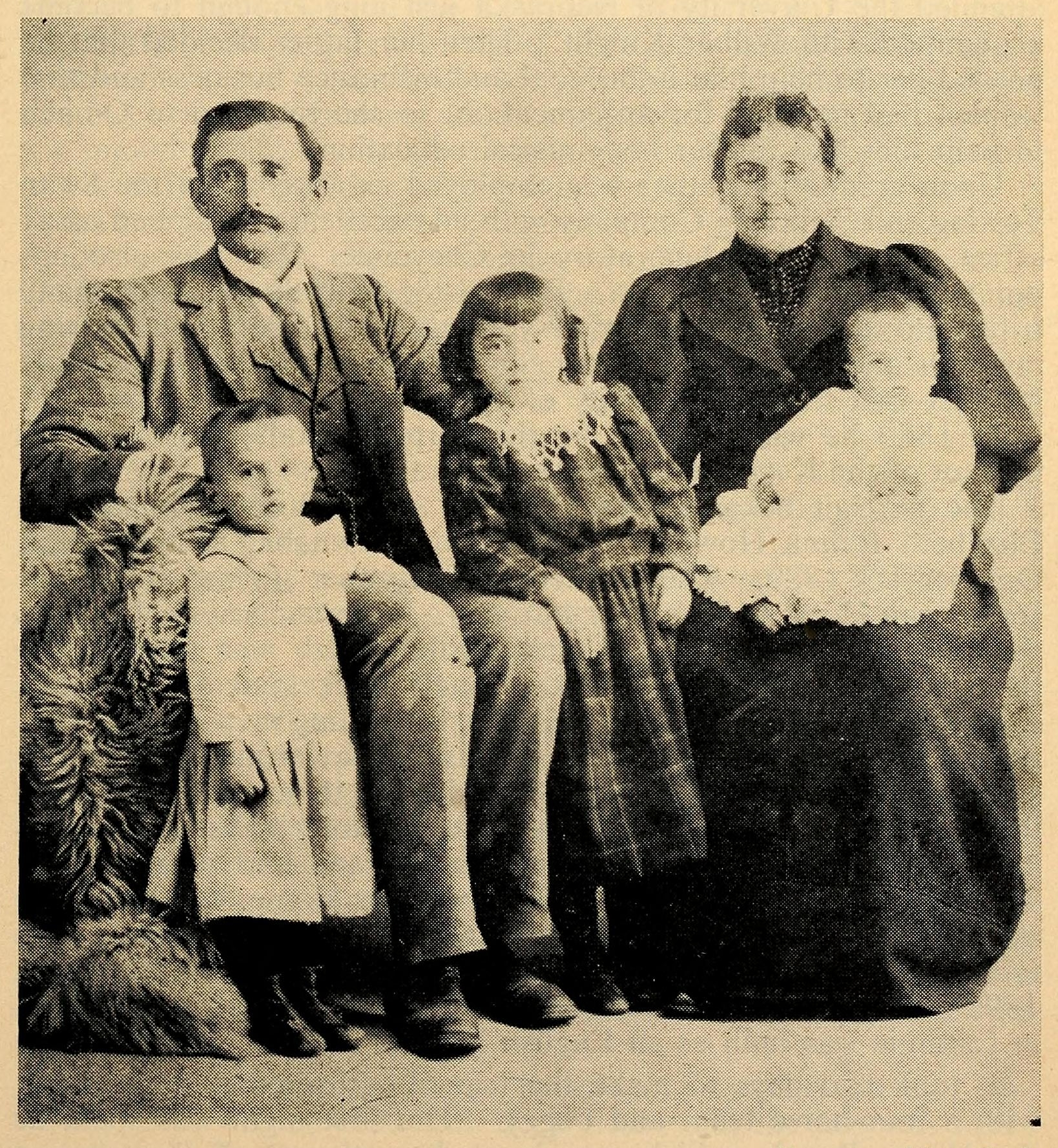
Wilbur and Emma with the children Samuel Howell, Wilburta Anna and Everett Lyell

Knight was born at Rochelle, Illinois from where his father David moved to farm in Blue Springs, Nebraska. He then went to the University of Nebraska, and graduated in 1886. He briefly considered studying botany. He then worked as an assayer at Swan Testing and Sampling Company from 1887 in Cheyenne, he became superintendent of mines in 1888 for Colorado and Wyoming. He also studied for his master's degree which he received in 1893. He became state geologist for Wyoming in 1898 and received a doctorate in 1901. He became chair of geology and mining engineering at the University of Wyoming in 1893 and was involved in establishing the department and the teaching of geology in the state. He also founded the geological museum for which he made collections himself while also making use of the services of William Harlow Reed. In 1900 he produced one of the earliest geological maps of Wyoming. Knight discovered fossil elephants in Wyoming in 1903 and estimated the Cenozoic Era to have lasted around four million years. He was a pioneer of the use of photography in paleontology. He often led geological excursions for his students as well as for interested people. In 1899 he took a party of about 100 fossil collectors around Como Bluff and the Grand Canyon. Free transportation was provided by the Union Pacific Railroad. In 1902, he published one of his last works being on the birds of Wyoming.

Knight married Elizabeth Emma Howell, a fellow student at the University of Nebraska, in 1889. Emma Knight worked in education and became the first dean of women at the University of Wyoming. They had three children, of whom Samuel Howell Knight followed his father as a geologist and professor at the University of Wyoming. Knight was also musically talented and played for the University band. He was also an associate of the American Ornithologists' Union.

Knight died from peritonitis following a ruptured appendix. The genus Knightia was named in his honor, which was in 1987 chosen as the state fossil of Wyoming.

Reconnaissance geological map of Wyoming, 1900
