= William Harlow Reed =

American paleontologist

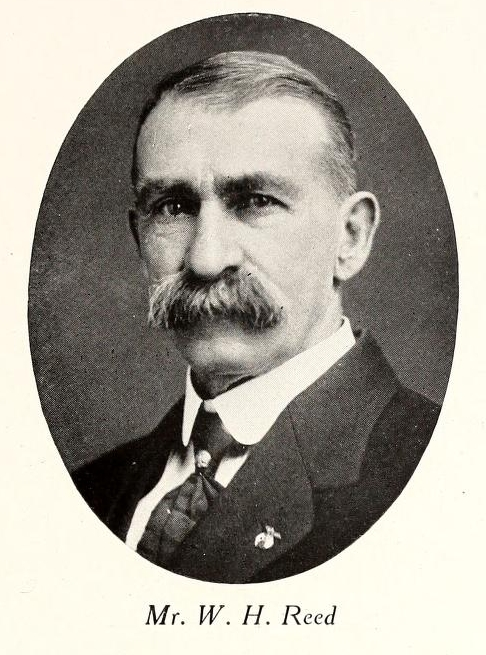

William Harlow Reed (9 June 1848 – 24 April 1915) was an American fossil collector and pioneer. He served as a curator at the Museum of Geology at the University of Wyoming, Laramie. He collected for a while for Othniel Charles Marsh but left after clashing with rival collectors at the height of the Bone Wars. Among his major finds was a near complete skeleton of a Brontosaurus (Apatosaurus) from Como Bluff. Reed's quarry in Como Bluff is named after him.

== Life and work ==
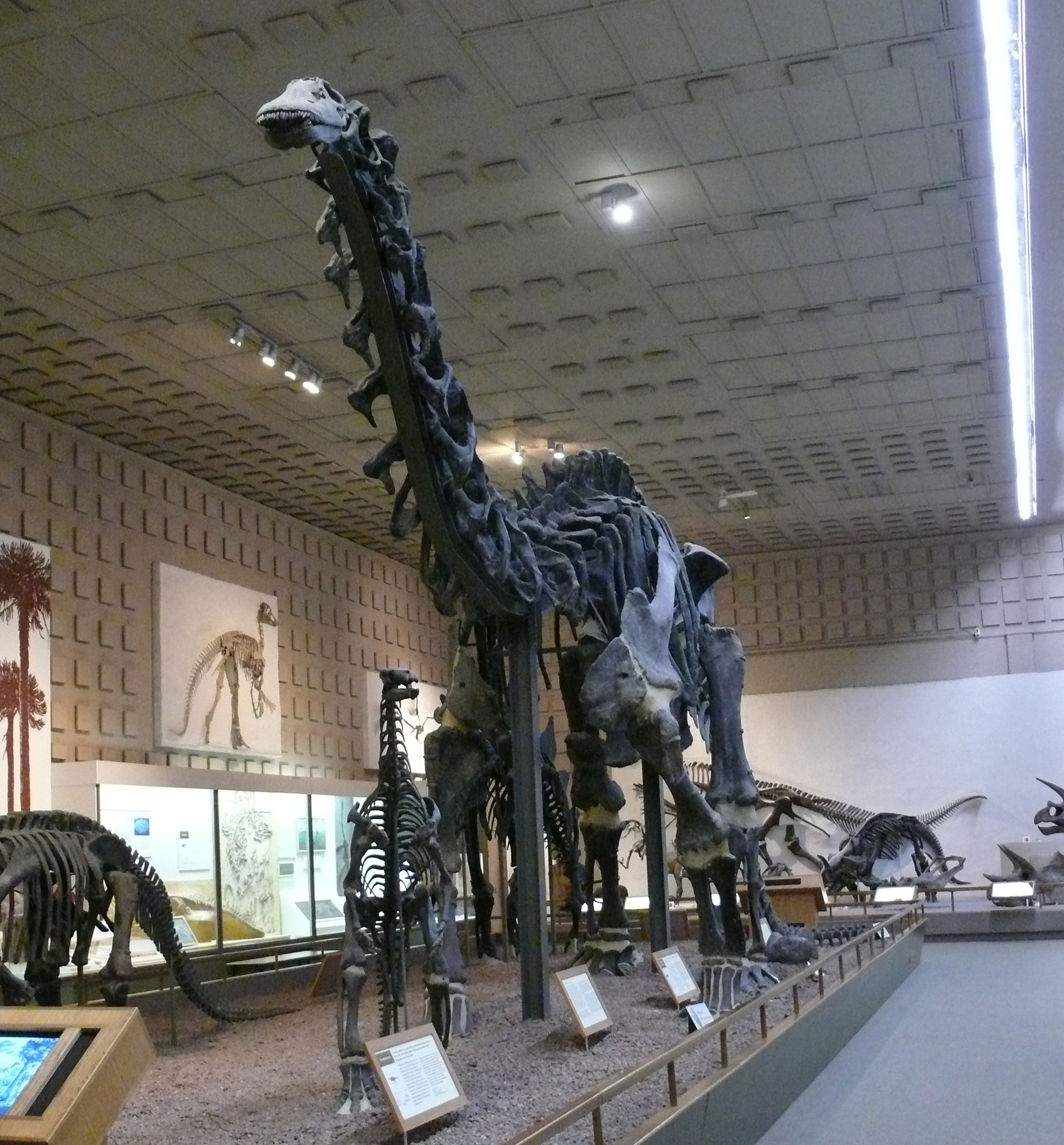
Yale museum specimen of Brontosaurus excelsus that was discovered by Reed

Reed was born near Hartford, Connecticut where his father Fedelius was a cooper and millwright of Scottish origins. Reed and his family moved to Ohio in 1853 and then moved to Michigan in 1863. Reed sought to join the Union Army several times and at the end of the Civil War, he joined the Union Pacific Railroad to shovel snow but his skills at shooting were recognized, he was contracted to provide fresh meat for the railway construction workers. Reed married Florence Bovee in Michigan in 1870. He was sometimes involved in fighting duties and as guide for the US Army on account of his familiarity with Indian dialects. During his travels, he saw the paleontological finds made by Othniel Charles Marsh and his group in the 1870s. In 1874 Reed's wife died in childbirth and he took up a job at Wyoming. On March 7, 1877, Reed noticed bones and vertebrae while walking near Como Bluff. Along with William Edwards Carlin, he wrote to O.C. Marsh and there they found Apatosaurus grandis (now Camarasaurus grandis). Reed and Carlin then began to collect for Marsh. In 1879 Reed was instructed by Marsh to destroy the fossil site to prevent rival collectors, principally Edward Drinker Cope who had won over Carlin as his collector.

In 1880, Reed married an Ohio school teacher, Anne E. Clark. In 1883, noting the problems with Marsh and the rivalry among collectors, he quit working on paleontological digs and began to ranch sheep along with George Bird Grinnell. When most of the sheep were killed in the winter of 1884, Reed went back to the fossil collection business as an independent collector. In 1894 he was hired by Wilbur Clinton Knight to help collect for the University of Wyoming in Laramie and in 1897 he became an assistant geologist and curator at the museum of the University of Wyoming. Reed continued to sell specimens to Marsh and this led to friction with Knight and Reed's resignation following his 1898 discovery of a specimen of Brontosaurus giganteus that was purchased by the Carnegie Museum and was hired his services. After two years of work, he quit the Carnegie Museum as he felt unrecognized. In 1903, following the death of Wilbur Knight, Reed was again offered a position at the University of Wyoming and he took up the position, now also including taking classes on geology. The lack of a formal training in science was a handicap and he was lost when it came to anatomy and matters of taxonomic description, leading to several mixed-up specimen mounts at the museum. These were removed by Samuel Howell Knight, William Clinton Knight's son who replaced Reed after his death. Reed died of dropsy, a generic description used in the past for heart failure.
