= Falkland sprat =

Conservation status
- Least Concern (IUCN 3.1)

Scientific classification
- Kingdom: Animalia
- Phylum: Chordata
- Class: Actinopterygii
- Division: Teleostei
- Order: Clupeiformes
- Family: Clupeidae
- Genus: Sprattus
- Species: S. fuegensis

Binomial name
- Sprattus fuegensis (Jenyns, 1842)

Synonyms
- Clupea fuegensis Jenyns, 1842; Sprattus fueguensis (Jenyns, 1842)

Species of fish

The Fueguian sprat or Falkland sprat (Sprattus fuegensis) is a herring-like, marine fish in the family Clupeidae found in the subtropical southwest Atlantic Ocean from 40° S to Tierra del Fuego and the Falkland Islands. Its depth range is from the surface to 10 m, and its length is up to 18 cm.

The Fueguian sprat has a lower jaw slightly projecting, and a gill cover without bony radiating striae. The last two anal fin rays are not enlarged, and there are no dark spots on the flanks. The pterotic bulla is absent. It is a schooling species found in coastal waters, and a food item of hakes, sea birds and seals in Patagonian Falkland waters.

Coloration is dark blue dorsally and silvery white laterally and ventrally, and all fins are translucent.
