= Emma Howell Knight =

First University of Wyoming Dean of Women

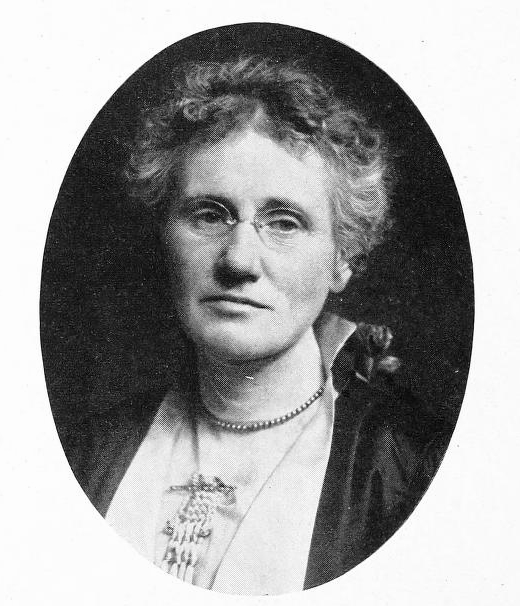
- Born: August 24, 1865
- Died: September 24, 1928 (aged 63); Laramie, Wyoming, US
- Resting place: Greenhill Cemetery, Laramie, Wyoming
- Citizenship: Canadian
- Education: University of Nebraska, University of Wyoming
- Occupation: Dean of Women
- Spouse: Wilbur Clinton Knight (married 1890–1903)
- Children: Samuel Howell Knight, Wilburta Florence Knight, Everett Knight, Oliver Knight

Emma Howell Knight (August 24, 1865 – September 24, 1928) was an American-Canadian academic and the University of Wyoming's first Dean of Women.

== Career ==
Emma Howell Knight began attending the University of Nebraska in 1890 at the age of 25. She temporarily paused her education after meeting her husband Wilbur Clinton Knight, moving to the Medicine Bow Mountains of Wyoming where her husband worked as a geologist. She began attending the University of Washington to continue her education after his death in 1903 and earned a 2 year diploma in Domestic Studies, whilst simultaneously working as the Albany County's superintendent of schools. She then became the University of Washington's Dean of Women in 1911 until her retirement in 1921.

She died in Laramie, Wyoming on September 24, 1928 after an emergency appendicitis operation.

== Legacy ==
The University of Wyoming dedicated a dormitory "Knight Hall", in memory of the former Dean.
