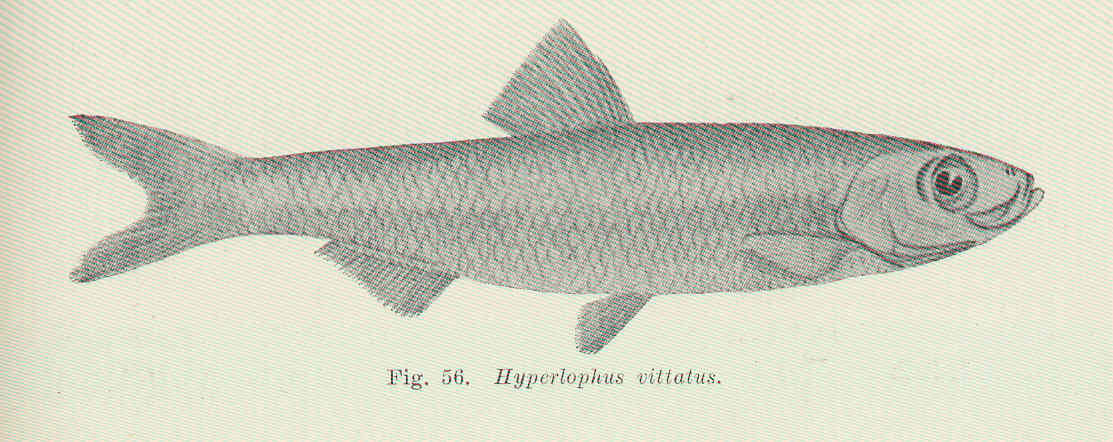
- Hyperlophus vittatus

Scientific classification
- Domain: Eukaryota
- Kingdom: Animalia
- Phylum: Chordata
- Class: Actinopterygii
- Order: Clupeiformes
- Family: Clupeidae
- Genus: Hyperlophus; J. D. Ogilby, 1892

Type species
- Clupea sprattellides Ogilby, 1892

= Hyperlophus =

Genus of fishes

Hyperlophus is a genus of sprat belonging to the herring family Clupeidae. They are endemic to the waters around Australia. There are currently two species recognized in the genus.

== Species ==
- Hyperlophus translucidus (McCulloch, 1917) (Transparent sandy sprat)
- Hyperlophus vittatus (Castelnau, 1875) (Sandy sprat)
