= Potamalosa =

Australian freshwater herring

Conservation status
- Least Concern (IUCN 3.1)

Scientific classification
- Kingdom: Animalia
- Phylum: Chordata
- Class: Actinopterygii
- Order: Clupeiformes
- Family: Clupeidae
- Genus: Potamalosa; J. D. Ogilby, 1897
- Species: P. richmondia

Binomial name
- Potamalosa richmondia (W. J. Macleay, 1879)

Species of fish

Potamalosa is a monospecific genus of freshwater ray-finned fish belonging to the family Clupeidae, which includes the anchovies, herrings and sprats. The only species in the genus is Potamalosa richmondia, the Australian freshwater herring. This species is endemic to eastern Australia where it lives in rivers, spawning in estuaries.
