= Oily fish =

Fish species with oils in their tissues and coelom

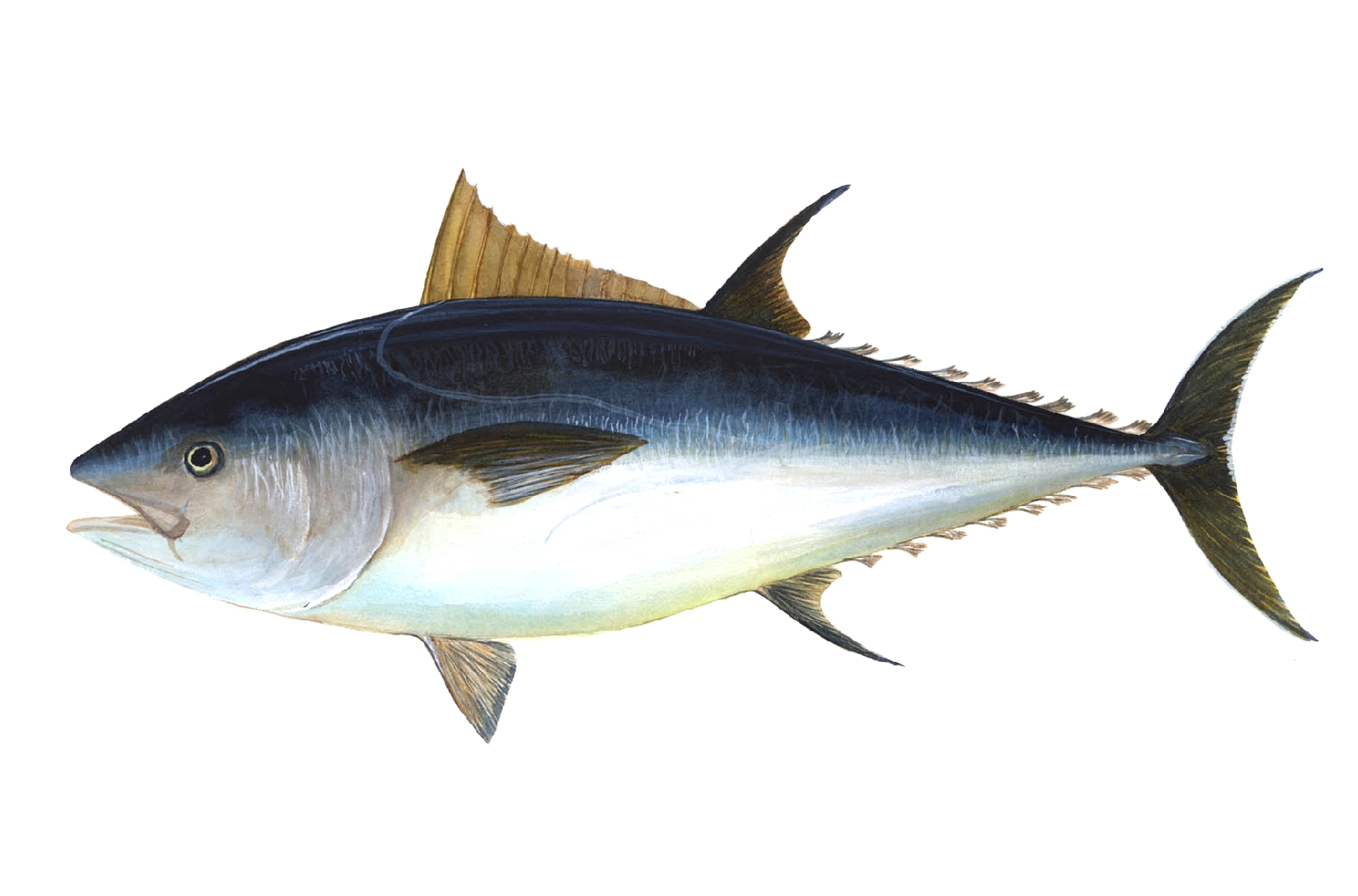
The large open-water Atlantic bluefin tuna is an oily fish.

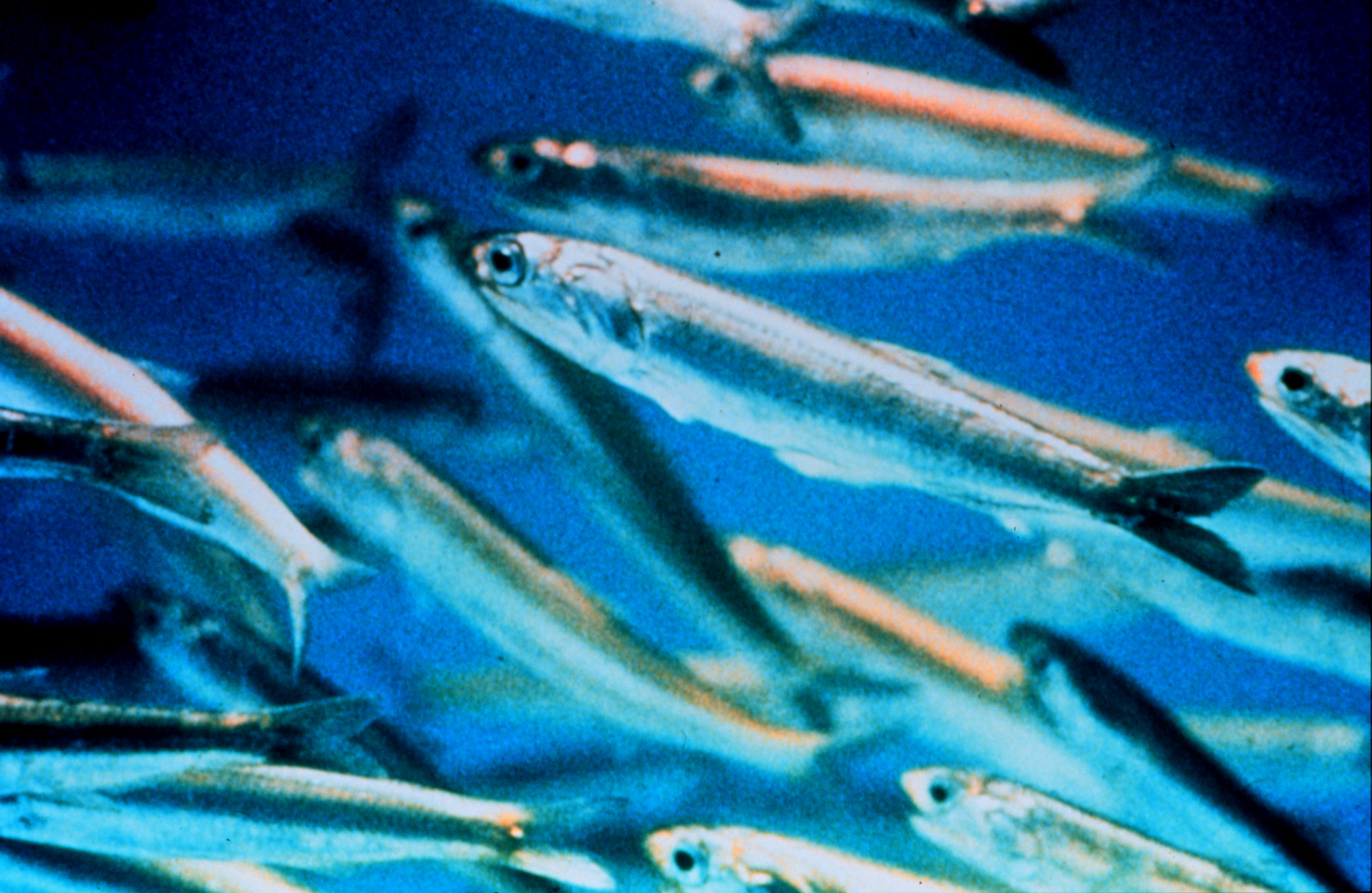
Most small forage fish, like these schooling anchovies, are also oily fish.

Oily fish, also known as blue fish, greasy fish or fatty fish, are species of fish with oil (fats) in soft tissues and in the coelomic cavity around the gut. Their fillets may contain up to 30% oil, although this figure varies both within and between species. Examples of oily fish include small forage fish such as sardines, herring and anchovies, and other larger pelagic fish such as salmon, trout, tuna, swordfish and mackerel.

Oily fish can be contrasted with whitefish, which contain oil only in the liver and in much less overall quantity than oily fish. Examples of whitefish are cod, haddock and flatfish. White fish are usually demersal fish which live on or near the seafloor, whereas oily fish are pelagic, living in the water column.

Compared to white fish, oily fish meat has higher concentrations of fat-soluble vitamins such as Vitamin A and D and omega-3 fatty acids. For this reason, the consumption of oily fish rather than white fish can be more beneficial to humans, particularly concerning heart diseases such as stroke and ischemic heart disease; however, oily fish are known to carry higher levels of contaminants (such as mercury, dioxin or POPs) than white fish. Among other benefits, studies suggest that the omega-3 fatty acids in oily fish may help improve inflammatory conditions such as arthritis.

== Health benefits ==
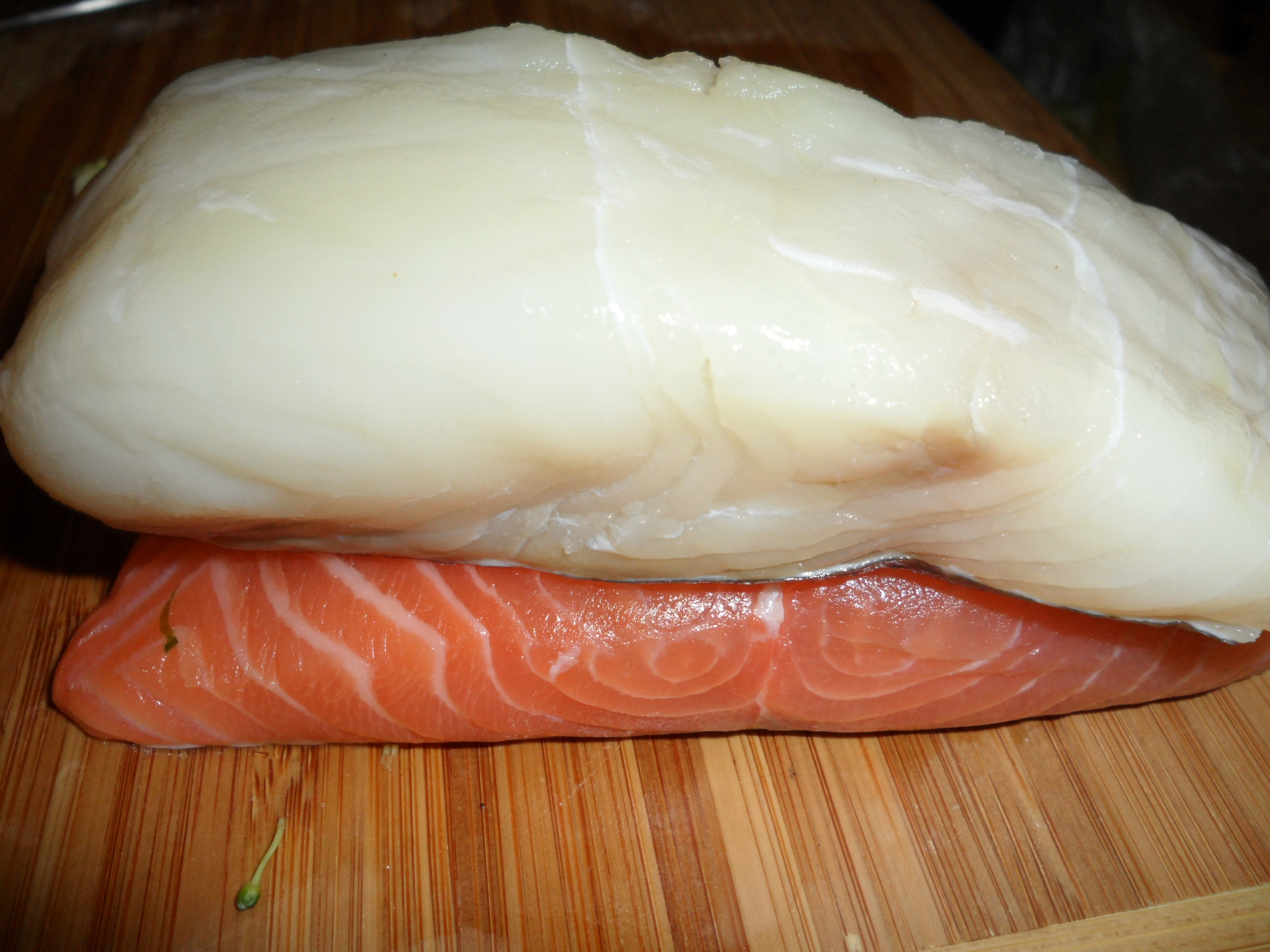
Oily fish fillet (salmon – bottom) contrasted with a white fish fillet (halibut – top)

=== Dementia ===
A 1997 study published in Annals of Neurology followed 5,386 elderly participants in Rotterdam. It found that fish consumption decreased the risk of dementia. However, the 2.1-year average follow-up was less than the three years dementia commonly affects people prior to diagnosis. Thus, the study was unclear as to whether fish consumption protected against dementia, or if dementia prevented the participants from wanting more fish.

French research published in 2002 in the British Medical Journal (BMJ) followed 1,674 elderly residents of southern France for seven years, studying their consumption of meat versus seafood and the presence of dementia symptoms. The conclusion was that people who ate fish at least once a week had a significantly lower risk of being diagnosed with dementia over a seven-year period. This study reinforced the findings reported in the Annals of Neurology. Because of the longer term, the BMJ study provided stronger evidence of a genuine protective effect. There was a possible confounding factor in that individuals with higher education have both a lower risk of dementia and higher consumption of fish.

=== Cardiovascular health ===
Consuming 200–400 g of oily fish twice per week may also help prevent sudden death due to myocardial infarction by preventing cardiac arrhythmia. The eicosapentaenoic acid found in fish oils appears to dramatically reduce inflammation through conversion within the body to resolvins, with beneficial effects for the cardiovascular system and arthritis.

== Recommended consumption ==
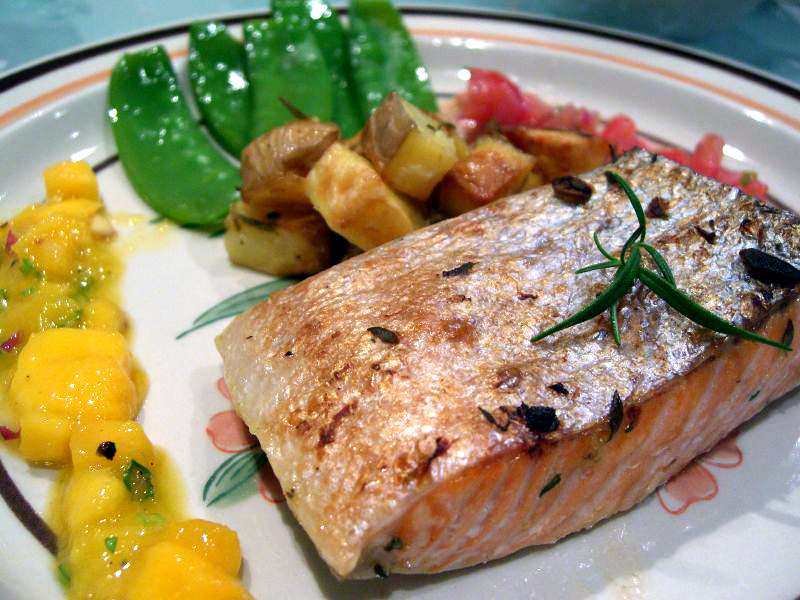
Grilled salmon, an oily fish

In 1994, the UK Committee on Medical Aspects of Food and Nutrition Policy recommended that people eat at least two portions of fish per week, one of which should be oily fish.

In 2004 the UK Food Standards Agency published advice on the recommended minimum and maximum quantities of oily fish to be eaten per week to balance the beneficial qualities of the omega-3 fatty acids against the potential dangers of ingesting polychlorinated biphenyls and dioxins. It reiterated the 1994 guideline of two portions of fish per week, including one portion of oily fish, but advised eating no more than four portions per week and no more than two portions for people who are pregnant, may become pregnant, or who are breastfeeding.

The United States Environmental Protection Agency's (EPA) Exposure Reference Dose (RfI) for methylmercury (MeHg) is 0.1 micrograms per kg body weight per day. The corresponding limit of blood mercury is 5.8 micrograms per liter. The restrictions apply to certain oily fish – "marlin, swordfish, shark and, to a lesser extent, tuna". The recommendations on maximum consumption of oily fish were up to four portions (1 portion = 140g, or approximately 4.9 ounces) a week for men, boys, and women past childbearing age, and up to two portions a week for women of childbearing age, including pregnant and breastfeeding women, and girls. There is no recommended limit on the consumption of white fish.

The EPA and 2007 U.S. Department of Agriculture guidelines set a limit only on consumption of fatty fish with greater than one part per million of methyl mercury, specifically tilefish, king mackerel, shark and swordfish. There are limits, however, for nursing/pregnant women and children under the age of six. This population should completely avoid fish with high risk of mercury contamination (those listed above) and limit consumption of moderate and low-mercury fish to 12 ounces or less per week. Albacore tuna should be limited to six ounces or less per week.

== Omega-3 content ==
Concerns about contamination, diet or supply have led to investigation of plant sources of omega-3 fatty acids, notably flax, hempseed and perilla oils. Lactating women who supplemented their diets with flaxseed oil showed increases in blood and breast milk concentrations of alpha-linolenic acid and eicosapentaenoic acid but no changes to concentrations of docosahexaenoic acid.

== See also ==
- Fish as food
- Mercury in fish
- Whitefish (fisheries term): it is low fat fish.
