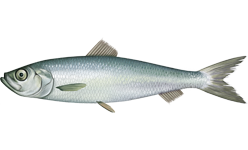
- Atlantic herring, Clupea harengus

Scientific classification
- Kingdom: Animalia
- Phylum: Chordata
- Class: Actinopterygii
- Division: Teleostei
- Order: Clupeiformes
- Suborder: Clupeoidei
- Family: Clupeidae; G. Cuvier, 1817

Genera
- Clupea Linnaeus, 1758; Sprattus Girgensohn, 1846

Synonyms
- Clupeinae Cuvier, 1817

= Clupeidae =

Clupeidae Temporal range: Middle Miocene to present

Family of fishes

Clupeidae is a small family of clupeiform ray-finned fishes, comprising the true herrings and sprats, inhabiting temperate marine habitats in both hemispheres. Members of the family have a body protected with shiny cycloid (very smooth and uniform) scales, a single dorsal fin, and a fusiform body for quick, evasive swimming and pursuit of prey composed of small planktonic animals. Due to their small size and position in the lower trophic level of many marine food webs, the levels of methylmercury they bioaccumulate are very low, reducing the risk of mercury poisoning when consumed.

== Taxonomy ==
The following genera are classified within the family:

- Clupea Linnaeus, 1758
- Sprattus Girgensohn, 1846

Until the 2020s, Clupeidae was treated as a wastebasket taxon containing almost all clupeoid fish with a generalized body plan. They were often divided into two subfamilies: the Clupeinae, containing primarily temperate taxa, and the Pellonulinae, containing primarily tropical taxa. Following molecular phylogenetic studies on the family, more subfamilies were erected within the Clupeidae, and in 2022, the entire group was split into multiple families, including the Dorosomatidae and Alosidae. Following a comprehensive study incorporating fossil taxa, many more of the remaining genera in Clupeidae were also split from the family (such as the family Hyperlophidae), until only two genera remained.

Many fossil genera were also previously classified in Clupeidae when it was a wastebasket taxon. However, the taxonomy of many of these is now uncertain, and they are better treated as indeterminate Clupeoidei. Fossil Clupea species are known from the Middle Miocene.

== Description and biology ==
Clupeids are mostly marine forage fish. The lateral line is short or absent, and the teeth are unusually small where they are present at all. Clupeids typically feed on plankton, and range from 2 to 75 cm (0.79 to 29.53 in) in length.

Clupeids spawn huge numbers of eggs (up to 200,000 in some species) near the surface of the water. After hatching, the larvae live among the plankton until they develop a swim bladder and transform into adults. These eggs and fry are not protected or tended to by parents. The adults typically live in large shoals, seeking protection from piscivorous predators such as birds, sharks and other predatory fish, toothed whales, marine mammals, and jellyfish. They also form bait balls.

Commercially important species of the Clupeidae include the Atlantic and Baltic herrings (Clupea harengus), and the Pacific herring (C. pallasii).

== Feeding physiology ==
The Clupeidae family primarily feed on small planktonic organisms. The teeth of members of this family are either reduced or absent, reduced teeth are miniature teeth that would be barely visible and line the interior of the fish's mouth. The structure of these teeth indicate that these organisms do not need to cut or tear their prey items as they would need fully formed teeth to complete this process. They do, however, possess long gill rakers that are designed for sifting plankton and other small particles out of the water as it passes through their gills. Gill rakers are protrusions along the gill arch, opposing the gill filaments, that help aquatic organisms to trap food particles.

The diet of many clupeids primarily consists of phytoplankton and plant matter during their larval stages. As the fish mature this diet begins to shift towards larger and more substantive organisms, including more zooplankton and copepods. This change in diet is possible due to their increase in body and gill raker size, which allows them to capture and process larger organisms to support themselves. Small organisms like these do not need to be ground or torn apart for consumption so pronounced teeth would not serve a purpose in the feeding habits of Clupeidae, instead the use of filter feeding allows for much more efficient nutrient collection.

The fusiform body shape of Clupeidae is also advantageous to their trophic ecology. The tapering body form is a highly hydrodynamic form that allows for quick increases in speed and a high maximum speed. Moving at high speeds allows the members of this family to regulate their feeding habits and avoid predators. Clupeidae can moderate the speed at which they swim to increase their uptake of nutrients. As with all filter feeders, Clupeidae cannot take in food if nutrient rich water does not pass over their gills. To moderate this, members of this family have been found to increase their swimming speed when they sense that there is a high concentration of food items in order to take advantage of this feeding period. Keeping a high swimming speed during periods of low food availability would not be efficient to maintain over long periods of time as the organisms would not net as much energy as they may need to in order to sustain themselves and increase their fitness. Increasing their swimming speed during feeding periods would allow them to take in more plankton while not suffering consequences from maintaining that speed.
