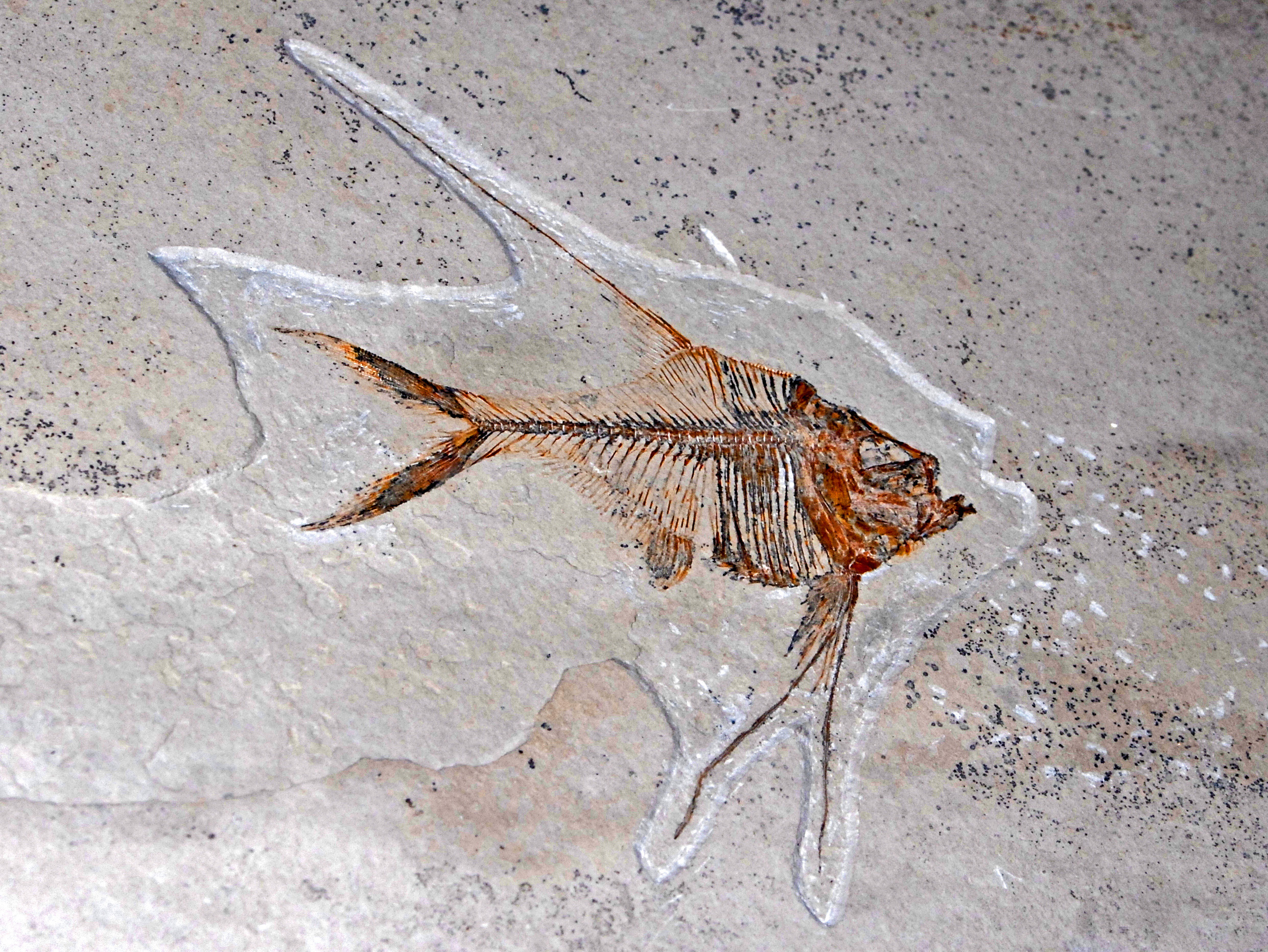
- Sorbinichthys elusivo

Scientific classification
- Kingdom: Animalia
- Phylum: Chordata
- Class: Actinopterygii
- Order: †Ellimmichthyiformes
- Suborder: †Sorbinichthyoidei
- Family: †Sorbinichthyidae; Bannikov & Bacchia, 2000
- Genus: †Sorbinichthys; Bannikov & Bacchia, 2000

Species
- †S. elusivo Bannikov & Bacchia, 2000; †S. africanus Murray and Wilson, 2010

= Sorbinichthys =

Sorbinichthys Temporal range: Cenomanian

Extinct genus of fishes

Sorbinichthys is a genus of extinct ray-finned fish from the Cenomanian of Lebanon and Morocco. It is classified within the order Ellimmichthyiformes. Both species within the genus are small (15 cm) and, like other members of their order, have deep bodies. The most notable feature of the genus is the presence of extremely long 2nd fin rays on the dorsal and pectoral fins that are much longer than the other rays on the respective fins. Sorbinichthys is one of the most basal members of the order and, in some analyes, the sister group of the rest of the order. The fish lived in shallow coastal environments that were home to a number of other fish and invertebrates. Two species are currently recognized: S. elusivo and S. africanus.

== History and naming ==
The type species of Sorbinichthys was described in 2000 by Bannikov & Bacchia based on material found within the Nammoura locality, within Lebanon. This description was based on the holotype specimen (CLC No. 431) along with two others (AGMV VP1 & MCSNT 12238) with all three specimens being complete specimens of the fish. Murray & Wilson later described a second species in 2010 based on material from a locality in southeastern Morocco that they titled "Agoult", with them naming it after a nearby village. This species was described off of the holotype (UALVP 51640) and paratypes (UALVP 47186 & UALVP 51641) with all three also being complete fish. These specimens were collected the previous year by a field team headed by Brian Chatterton and are of a similar preservation to the ones seen in Lebanon. In 2023, the osteology and relationships of Sorbinichthys were analyzed by Taverne & Capasso. In this paper, a new definition was given to the genus and type species with them also corroborating the more basal placement of Sorbinichthys within earlier papers.

The name of Sorbinichthys derives from the Italian paleoichthyologist and a friend of the authors, Dr. Lorenzo Sorbini, along with the Greek word for fish. The species name of the type species, "elusivo", comes from the Italian word for evasive, referring to the fact that the dorsal and pectoral fins were hidden before the fossils were prepared. The species name of the second species, "africanus", derives from the fact that the fossils were found in Africa.

== Description ==
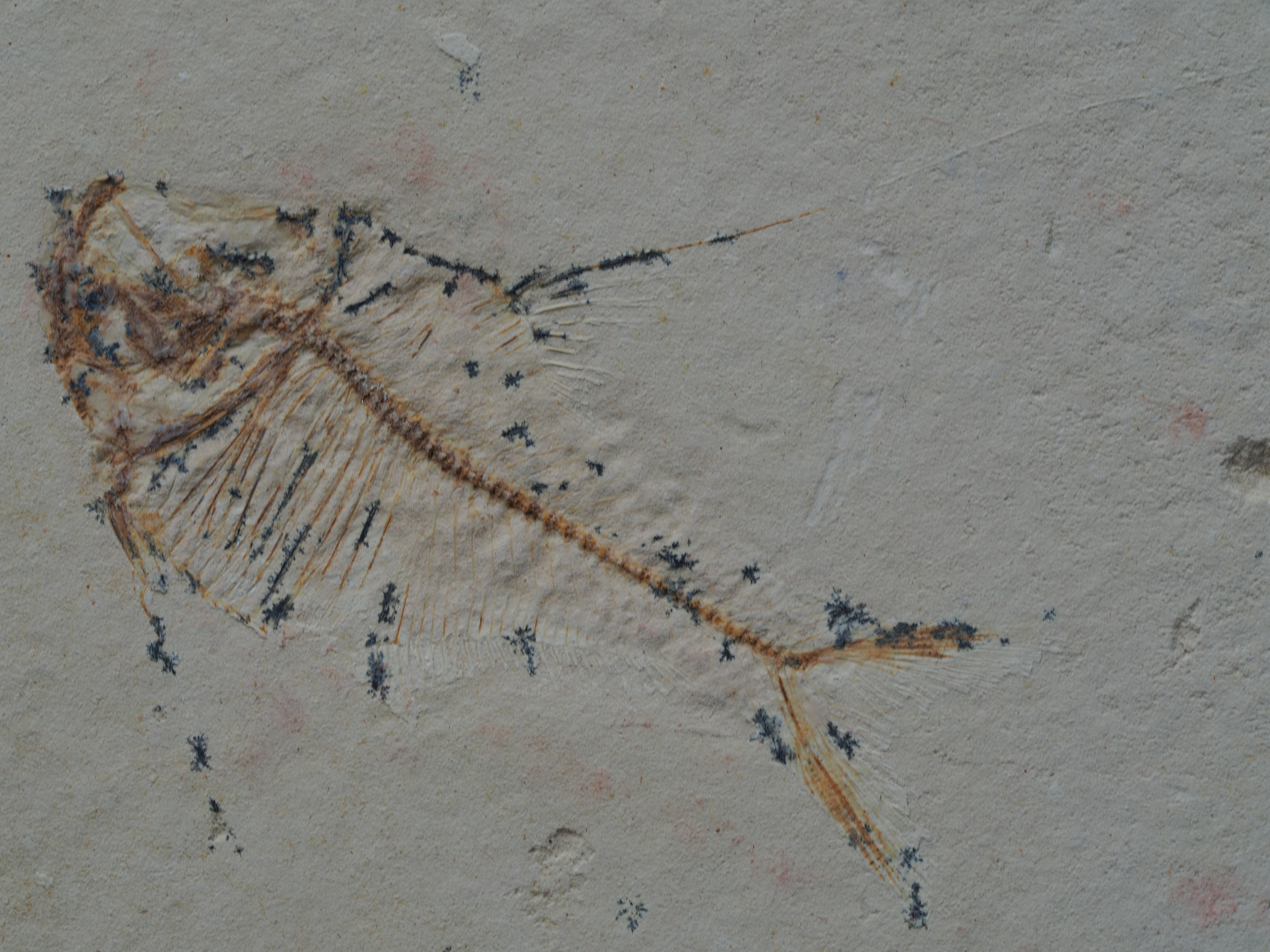
Sorbinichthys africanus

Sorbinichthys was a small, deep-bodied fish with the larger of the two species, S. elusivo, only reaching a maximum length of 15 cm. Though the fish had deeper bodies, they were not as deep-bodied as members of Paraclupeidae with their maximal body depth being just under half of the standard length, similar to Diplomystus. Their pectoral fins are long, reaching towards the base of the pelvic fin, and located low on the flank with an enlarged second fin ray. The pelvic fins of Sorbinichthys are small and positioned at the midline of the dorsal fin. This dorsal fin is generally large and is located between the origins of the pectoral and anal fin origins, the second dorsal ray is elongated similar to the second ray of the pectoral fins. The anal fin of the fish is long is long with it being present on the majority of the area between the anal and caudal fin. The caudal fin is forked with procurrent rays being present on the upper and lower parts of the fin. Within the caudal fin, there is a very large "U" shaped diastema between the hypural 2 and 3. Scutes are located around the body of Sorbinichthys with a majority of them (25-30 scutes) being located between the skull and dorsal fin. These scutes are also located on the ventral midline (12-14 scutes) and in the postpelvic area (3 scutes). These scutes are wide with some having a spine towards the front. Like the rest of the body, the skull of Sorbinichthys is deep with it making up between 25 and 32% of the standard length. In both species, the parietal bones are small and reach the midline of the body. The maxilla of the fish is long and, like the rest of the jaws, has small teeth. Though incorrectly identified in the original description of the type species, the jaw of both species is articulated in line with the middle of the orbit.

=== Sorbinichthys elusivo ===
Specimens of S. elusivo are more well preserved than what is seen in the other species, with fins being one of the notable examples. Unlike S. africanus, specimens of the type species have completely preserved pectoral and anal fins. The complete pectorals shows and extremely long second pectoral fin ray and a more rounded anal fish when compared to the other species. Just like other ellimmichthyiforms, S. elusivo possessed two supramaxillae, another feature only preserved on the type species. The fish's vertebral column is made up of 17-18 abdominal vertebrae and 22-23 caudal vertebrae.

=== Sorbinichthys africanus ===
Sorbinichthys africanus is much smaller than the type species with specimens measuring 4–5 cm. The lower jaw of S. africanus is slightly longer than S. elusivo with it making up around 70% of the skull length compared to the 57-64% seen in the type species. It possesses 3 fewer pleural ribs than S. elusivo and has a shorter dorsal fin than the other species. The edge of the anal fin is not preserved in specimens of the species though, based on fact that the anal fin rays are all around the same thickness, it most likely had a straight edge. S. africanus processed more vertebrae than the other species with the vertebral column being made up of 16 abdominal vertebrae and 25-26 caudal vertebrae.

== Classification ==
The placement of Sorbinichthys within Ellimmichthyiformes has consistently been found as it being at or near the base of the group, though papers argue what other more basal members it is closest to. Alvarado-Ortega et al. (2008) suggested that Sorbinichthys would have been in a clade with Diplomystus though more recent papers suggest a less close relationship between the two genera. Another suggestion is that the fish may form a sister group with Gasteroclupea though this has received less support in studies such as Marramà, Khalloufi, & Carnevale (2023). Even with the exact placement of the genus within the order relative to other taxa being uncertain, a number of papers agree that it potentially is the sister group to the rest of ellimmichthyiforms.

- - Chanos chanos
  - - - Denticeps clupeoides
      - - Chirocentrus dorab
        - - Hyperlophus vittatus
          - - Alosa sapidissima
            - Odaxothrissa vittata
    - - Sorbinichthyidae
        - Sorbinichthys africanus
        - Sorbinichthys elusivo
      - - Codoichthys carnavalii
        - - - Foreyclupea loonensis
            - Ranulfoicthys dorsonudum
            - Ornategulum sardinoides
          - - Gasteroclupeidae
              - Gasteroclupea branisai
              - - Guiclupea superstes
                - - - Diplomystus dentatus
                    - Diplomystus shengliensis
                  - - Diplomystus birdi
                    - Diplomystus dubertreti
            - - Armigatidae
                - Armigatus carrenoae
                - - - Armigatus namourensis
                    - Armigatus brevissimus
                  - - Armigatus oligodentatus
                    - - Armigatus dalmaticus
                      - Armigatus alticorpus
              - Paraclupeidae
                - - Thorectichthys rhadinus
                  - Thorectichthys marocensis
                - - - Ezkutuberezi carmenae
                    - Eoellimmichthys superstes
                  - - - Ellimma branneri
                      - - Rhombichthys intoccabilis
                        - - - Tycheroichthys dunveganensis
                            - Tunisiclupea seperatus
                          - - Paraclupea chetungensis
                            - - Paraclupea solignaci
                              - Paraclupea seilacheri
                    - - Ellimmichthys longicostatus
                      - - - 'Ellimma' longipectoralis
                          - - 'Ellimmichthys' spinosus
                            - Scutatospinosus itapagipensis
                        - - - Triplomystus oligoscutatus
                            - Triplomystus noorae
                          - - Scutatoclupea bacchiai
                            - Scutatoclupea applegatei

Phylogenetic placement of S. elusivo and S. africanus, as presented by Marramà, G., Khalloufi, B., & Carnevale, G. (2023).

== Paleoenvironment ==
=== Sorbinichthys elusivo ===
Sorbinichthys elusivo was found at the Nammoura locality of the Sannine Formation, a well known late Middle Cenomanian locality near Beirut the preserves a diverse fish fauna on a carbonate platform. This environment would have been located within a small basin with restricted water circulation. At the bottom of this shallow basin, there would have been hypersaline conditions, with this being the area where things preserved. A number of plant fossils have also been found in the locality, suggesting that it represents a near-shore environment with a more arid, seasonal climate due to the presence of xeromorphic plants and laminated limestone. This ecosystem would have been on the coast of an emergent island with the nearest shore being located hundreds of kilometers to the south.

=== Sorbinichthys africanus ===
Sorbinichthys africanus was found at the Agoult locality of the Akrabou Formation which preserves a late Cenomanian to potentially early Turonian marine environment. Besides S. africanus, a number of fish, arthropods, echioderms, worms, and plant fossils have been described. The area would have been a part of the Preafrican Trough which preserves a variety of environments. This carbonate platform would have been influenced by the Tethys Sea with water levels rising during the early Turonian. At the time, a number of areas show evidence of being poorly-oxygenated which has been suggested to be the reason for the higher paleoproductivity in the area at the time. Due to the presence of both marine and terrestrial fauna, it has been suggested that the locality represents a shallow coastal environment. This shallow environment was most likely a warm, quiet muddy lagoon that would have been bordered by a reef with isotope analysis suggesting a water temperature of 24.8 °C. During the time of preservation, the climate would have been wetter than in the past due to the Cenomanian Carbon Isotope Excursion.
