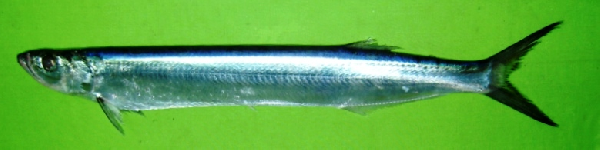

Conservation status
- Least Concern (IUCN 3.1)

Scientific classification
- Kingdom: Animalia
- Phylum: Chordata
- Class: Actinopterygii
- Division: Teleostei
- Order: Clupeiformes
- Family: Chirocentridae
- Genus: Chirocentrus
- Species: C. nudus

Binomial name
- Chirocentrus nudus Swainson, 1839

Synonyms
- Chirocentrus russellii Swainson, 1838

= Chirocentrus nudus =

Species of fish

Chirocentrus nudus, the whitefin wolf-herring, is a species of marine ray-finned fish belonging to the family Chirocentridae, the wolf herrings. This species has a wide Indo-Pacific distribution. It is a pelagic, predatory fish of coastal waters.

== Taxonomy ==
Chirocentrus nudus was first formally described in 1838 by the English naturalist William Swainson with no type locality given. It was later ascertained to be Visakhapatnam in India. This species is one of two species in the genus Chirocentrus, the other is C. dorab, which is the type species. Chirocentrus is the only genus in the monogeneric family Chirocentridae which is classified in the suborder Clupeoidei of the order Clupeiformes, the herring-like fishes.

== Etymology ==
Chirocentrus nudus is one of two species in the genus Chirocentrus, a name which compouns chiro, derived from the Greek from cheír or cheirós and meaning "hand", i.e. the pectoral fin, with kentron, meaning "a sharp point", an allusion to the long, bony appendage at the base of the pectoral fin of C. dorab. The specific name, nudus, means "naked", Swainson though this fish was scaleless but the scales are small and readily fall off.

== Description ==
Chirocentrus nudus have slender, elongated bodies, fang like canine teeth, and small scales. They can grow up to 100 cm (39 in) in length and around 410 g (14 oz) in weight. Compared to the closely related dorab wolf-herring (Chirocentrus dorab), C. nudus has a longer pectoral fin. • The dorsal fin has 16-19 rays while the anal fin has 29-36 rays. The pectoral fin is long, with a length greater than the distance from the centre of the eye centre to the edge of the operculum. The dorsal and anal fins colourless, with the distal part of dorsal fin being clear, and there is no black on the front part of the anal fin). There are bands of green and blue on the back.

== Distribution and habitat ==
Chirocentrus nudus is a coastal pelagic species with a wide Indo-Pacific distribution from the eaastern coast of Africa and Madagascar north to the Red Sea and the Seychelles around the Arabian Peninsula into the Persian Gulf and east innto the Pacific Ocean as fars as Australia and New Guinea, north to China.

== Biology ==
Chirocentrus nudus is a mainly piscivorous species, with 98% of its diet consisting of small fishes, but will also eat squid and crustaceans.

== Fisheries ==
Chirocentrus nudus is a commercial species which is sold fresh, dried, salted or frozen. It is also a game fish. Whitefin wolf-herring is a commonly eaten fish in many Asian and European countries. In Kuwait the whitefin wolf-herring is caught in the summer using trawls and gill nets, seine nets in the autumn and traps in the winter.
