= Akrabou Formation =

Geological formation in Morocco

- Stratigraphic range: latest Cenomanian to ?middle Turonian; ~93.9–90 Ma
- Fish of the Akrabou Formation
- Type: Geological formation
- Sub-units: Agoult, Goulmima, others
- Overlies: Kem Kem Group

Lithology
- Primary: Limestone

Location
- Coordinates: 30.5°N 4.8°W
- Approximate paleocoordinates: 17.8°N 4.8°W
- Region: Er Rachidia
- Country: Morocco, Algeria
- Extent: central and eastern Morocco north and south of the Pre-African Trough

Type section
- Named by: El Mostafa Ettachfini, Bernard Andreu
- Year defined: 2004
- Akrabou Formation (Morocco)

The Akrabou Formation is a Late Cretaceous (latest Cenomanian to early/mid Turonian)-aged geological formation and Konservat-Lagerstätte in Morocco. It overlies the slightly older freshwater deposits of the Kem Kem Group, which it was once thought to be a part of. It was deposited over following the Kem Kem ecosystem's submergence by the Tethys Ocean during a marine transgression from the Cenomanian-Turonian boundary event, as part of a wider deposition of carbonate platforms across the region from the event.

== Localities ==
The Akrabou Formation has outcrops across the Anti-Atlas, but it has two especially prominent localities: Agoult and Goulmima (also known as Asfla). The Agoult locality is also commonly referred to as Gara Sbaa due to it outcropping at the hill of the same name, but this name is also used for the underlying freshwater-based deposit of the Kem Kem Group at the same locality, which may lead to nomenclatural confusion. Both localities are considered lagerstätten due to their excellently preserved fossils, but they differ in time period, paleoenvironment, and preservation of fossils.

The Agoult locality is the older of the two and appears to have been deposited around the time of the Cenomanian-Turonian boundary event, dating it to latest Cenomanian or earliest Turonian. It is a plattenkalk that contains excellently preserved two-dimensional fossils of fish, land plants, marine and terrestrial invertebrates, and some terrestrial reptiles. The presence of a significant terrestrial component indicates it was deposited in a shallow marine environment close to shore, although the deposits record the gradual deepening of the habitat as the sea level rose.

In contrast, the Goulmima locality is younger, dating to the early or mid Turonian, and appears to have been deposited in an offshore environment on the continental shelf. Fossils from this locality, which include fish and marine reptiles, are found in concretions and have a unique three-dimensional preservation akin to that of the older Santana Formation in Brazil.

In addition, several other localities are also known, some of which cross the border into Algeria, which have a rich fauna of ammonites and nautiloids.

== Paleoenvironment ==
In the basal Agoult horizons of the formation, a number of plant remains are known, which are similar to those found in southern Europe at the same time, suggesting floristic exchanges between northern Africa and southern Europe. Based on these, the paleoclimate of the ecosystem, at least earlier during its deposition, is suggested to have been a mildly dry subtropical climate akin to that of the modern western Canary Islands.

== Paleobiota ==
Color key: Taxon / Reclassified taxon / Taxon falsely reported as present / Dubious taxon or junior synonym / Ichnotaxon / Ootaxon / Morphotaxon	Notes; Uncertain or tentative taxa are in small text; ~~crossed out~~ taxa are discredited.

Most fish are documented in a species list from Amalfitano et al (2020) & Cooper et al (2023):

=== Vertebrates ===
==== Cartilaginous fish ====
Genus	Species	Locality	Material	Notes	Image
Asflapristis	A. cristadentis	Goulmima	Incomplete three-dimensional skeletons, isolated teeth	A ptychotrygonid sawskate.	
Cretomanta	C. sp.	Goulmima	Isolated teeth	A chondrichthyan of uncertain affinties, possibly an aquilolamnid.	
Haimirichia	H. amonensis	Agoult	Partial skeleton	A haimirichiid mackerel shark.	
Ptychodus	P. maghrebianus	Goulmima	Dental battery, isolated teeth	A ptychodontid shark.	
Ptychotrygon	P. rostrispatula	Goulmima	Incomplete skeletons	A ptychotrygonid sawskate.	
?Rhinobatos	?R. sp.	Goulmima	Incomplete cranium	A presumed guitarfish.	
Squalicorax	S. sp.	Goulmima	Teeth	A crow shark.	
Tingitanius	T. tenuimandibulus	Goulmima	Three-dimensionally preserved incomplete skeleton of a young individual	The oldest known platyrhinid ray.	

==== Bony fish ====
Genus	Species	Locality	Material	Notes	Image
Acanthomorpha indet.		Agoult	Complete specimen	A poorly-preserved acanthomorph of uncertain affinities.	
Agoultichthys	A. chattertoni	Agoult	Complete specimen	A macrosemiid.	Agoultichthys chattertoni Murray & Wilson, 2008
Agoultpycnodus	A. aldrovandii	Agoult	Complete specimen	A pycnodont.	
Amioidea gen. et sp. nov. 1		Agoult		Undescribed amiiforms in their own family.	
Amioidea gen. et sp. nov. 2		Agoult		Undescribed amiiforms in their own family.	
Anomoeodus	A. sp. "A"	Goulmima	Isolated jaw bones.	A pycnodont.	
Anomoeodus	A. sp. "B"	Goulmima	Isolated jaw bones.	A pycnodont.	
Armigatus	A. oligodentatus	Agoult	Complete specimens	An armigatid clupeomorph.	
Belonostomus	B. sp.	Agoult	Complete specimen	An aspidorhynchid.	
Araripichthys	A. corythophorus	Goulmima	Incomplete specimens with associated skull remains	An araripichthyiform.	
cf. Chanoidei indet.		Agoult	Complete specimen	A potential chanid.	
Cladocyclus	C. sp.	Agoult		An ichthyodectid.	
cf. Dercetis	cf D. sp.	Agoult	Complete specimens	A dercetid aulopiform.	
Enchodus	E. sp.	Goulmima	Incomplete specimens, isolated crania & teeth,	An enchodontid aulopiform.	
Errachidia	E. pentaspinosa	Agoult	Complete specimen	A pharmacichthyid lamprimorph.	Errachidia pentaspinosa Murray & Wilson, 2014
Goulmimichthys	G. arambourgi	Goulmima	Complete specimen.	A pachyrhizodontid crossognathiform.	
Grandemarinus	G. gherisiensis	Goulmima	3 specimens known, one complete.	A gar.	
Ghrisichthys	G. bardacki	Goulmima	Isolated cranium	An ichthyodectid.	
Homalopagus	H. multispinosus	Agoult	Complete specimen	A pharmacichthyid lamprimorph.	Homalopagus multispinosus Murray & Wilson, 2014
Ichthyodectes	I. sp.	Goulmima	Complete specimen, isolated crania	An ichthyodectid.	
Kradimus	K. asflaensis	Goulmima	Complete specimen.	A pachyrhizodontid crossognathiform.	
Lusitanichthys	L. africanus	Agoult	Complete specimen	A clupavid otophysan.	Lusitanichthys africanus Cavin, 1999
Maghrebichthys	M. nelsoni	Agoult	Complete specimen	A pycnosteroidid beardfish.	Magrebichthys nelsoni Murray & Wilson, 2014
Neomesturus	N. asflaensis	Goulmima	Isolated jaw bones.	A pycnodont.	
Nursallia	N. fenestrata	Goulmima		A pycnodont	
Osmeroides	O. rheris	Goulmima	Isolated crania	An osmeroidid albuliform.	
Paranursallia	P. cavini	Goulmima	Isolated jaw bones.	A pycnodont.	
Pleuropholis	P. danielae	Agoult	Complete specimen	The last known pleuropholid.	
Polazzodus	P. sp.	Goulmima	Isolated jaw bones.	A pycnodont.	
Rhynchodercetis	R. sp.	Agoult	Complete specimens.	A dercetid aulopiform.	Rhynchodercetis sp.
Saurorhamphus	S. sp.	Agoult	Complete specimens.	A eurypholid aulopiform.	
Sorbinichthys	S. africanus	Agoult	Complete specimen.	A sorbinichthyid clupeomorph.	Sorbinichthys africanus Murray & Wilson, 2011
Teleostei indet.		Agoult	Complete specimen	An indeterminate teleost.	
Thorectichthys	T. marocensis	Agoult	Complete specimens.	A paraclupeid clupeomorph.	Thorectichthys marocensis Murray & Wilson, 2013
Thorectichthys	T. rhadinus	Agoult	Complete specimens.	A paraclupeid clupeomorph.	Thorectichthys rhadinus Murray & Wilson, 2013

==== Reptiles ====
Genus	Species	Locality	Material	Notes	Image
Brachauchenius	B. lucasi	Goulmima	Partial mandible	A pliosaur, the first record of this species outside North America.	
Libonectes	L. morgani (=L. atlasense)	Goulmima	Articulated skull and post-cranial skeleton.	An elasmosaurid plesiosaur, the first record of this species outside North America.	
Manemergus	M. anguirostris	Goulmima	Partially complete skeleton	A polycotylid plesiosaur.	
Protostegidae indet.		Goulmima	Carapace, skull	Indeterminate protostegid turtles.	
Tethysaurus	T. nopcsai	Goulmima	Hundreds of specimens of different age classes, some nearly complete	A tethysaurine mosasaur.	
Thililua	T. longicollis	Goulmima	Complete skull, lower jaw, and articulated vertebrae	A polycotylid plesiosaur.	
Polycotylidae indet.		Goulmima	Skull with mandible	An indeterminate polycotylid plesiosaur.	
Squamata indet.		Agoult	Complete specimen	A small indeterminate terrestrial lizard, specimen now lost.	

=== Mollusks ===
Based on Kennedy et al (2008) & Meister et al (2017):

Genus	Species	Locality	Material	Notes	Image
Angulithes	A. mermeti	Douira, Goulmima & Tazzougert	Shells	A hercoglossid nautiloid.	
Choffaticeras	C. segne	Goulmima	Shells	A pseudotissotid ammonite.	
Choffaticeras	C. sinaiticum	Goulmima	Shells	A pseudotissotid ammonite.	
Eutrephoceras	E. sp.	Douira & Taouz	Shells	A nautilid nautiloid.	
Fagesia	F. peroni	Goulmima	Shells	A vasoceratid ammonite.	
Fagesia	F. cf. tevesthensis	Goulmima	Shells	A vasoceratid ammonite.	
Hoplitoides	H. mirabilis	Goulmima	Shells	A hoplitid ammonite.	
Hoplitoides	H. gr. wortmanni	Goulmima	Shells	A hoplitid ammonite.	
Mammites	M. nodosoides	Goulmima	Shells	An acanthoceratid ammonite.	
Nannovascoceras	N. intermedium	Goulmima	Shells	A vasoceratid ammonite.	
Neolobites	N. vibrayeanus	Agoult, Tazzougert, Taouz, Tizi Momrad	Shells	An engonoceratid ammonite.	
Neoptychites	N. cephalotus	Goulmima	Shells	A vasoceratid ammonite.	
Neoptychites	N. aff. hottingeri	Goulmima	Shells	A vasoceratid ammonite.	
Romaniceras (Yubariceras)	R. (Y.) reymenti	Goulmima	Shells	An acanthoceratid ammonite.	
Thomasites	T. rollandi	Goulmima	Shells	A vasoceratid ammonite.	
Wrightoceras	W. munieri	Goulmima	Shells	A pseudotissotid ammonite.	

=== Arthropods ===
Partially based on Garassino, Angeli & Pasini (2014):

Genus	Species	Locality	Material	Notes	
Afroapseudes	A. cretacicus	Agoult		A tanaidacean crustacean.	Afroapseudes cretacicus Pasini, Vega & Garassino 2022
Amazighopsis	A. cretacea	Agoult		An astacidean crustacean.	
Corazzatocarcinus	C. cf. hadjoulae	Agoult		A necrocarcinid crab.	
Cretagalathea	C. exigua	Agoult		A munidid squat lobster.	
Cretapenaeus	C. berberus	Agoult		A penaeid prawn.	Cretapenaeus berberus Garassino, Pasini & Dutheil, 2006
Galathea	G. sahariana	Agoult		A galatheid squat lobster.	Galathea sahariana Garassino, De Angeli & Pasini, 2008
?Glyphea	G. garaasbaensis	Agoult		A glypheid crustacean.	Glyphea garasbaaensis Garassino, De Angeli & Pasini, 2008
Mesolimulus	M. tafraoutensis	Agoult	Two complete specimens	A horseshoe crab.	
?Isoptera indet.		Agoult	Complete specimen	A potential termite.	
Marocarcinus	M. pasinii	Agoult		A marocarcinid crab.	
Muelleristhes	M. africanus	Agoult	Complete specimen	A porcelain crab.	
Palinuridae indet.		Agoult	Complete specimen	A spiny lobster.	
Phagophytichnus	P. ekowskii	Agoult	Trace fossil	Feeding traces on a leaf.	
Polyphaga indet.		Agoult	Complete specimen	A polyphagan beetle.	
Telamonocarcinus	T. cf. gambalatus	Agoult		A dorippid crab.	
Troponoma	T. constricta	Agoult	Trace fossil	Trail made by a leafminer.	
Unusuropode	U. castroi	Agoult	Complete specimen	A sphaeromatid isopod, first record of this species outside Brazil.	Unusuropode castroi Duarte & Santos, 1962

=== Plants ===
Based primarily on Krassilov & Bacchia (2013):

Genus	Species	Locality	Material	Notes	Image
Abietites	A. (Tritaenia) cf. linkii	Agoult	Needles	A conifer.	
Barykovia	B. cf. tschuckotika	Agoult	Leaf	A potentially fagalean angiosperm.	
Cocculophyllum	C. cf. fucinerve	Agoult	Leaf	A climbing angiosperm.	
Coniopteris	C. cf. Dicksonia mamiyai	Agoult	Leaflet.	A fern.	
Dryophyllum	D. cf. subcretaceum	Agoult	Leaf	A potentially fagalean angiosperm.	
Frenelopsis	F. cf. teixeirae	Agoult	Shoot	A cheirolepidiacean conifer.	
Garasbahia	G. flexuosa	Agoult	Branching shoot with leaves.	A cabombacean angiosperm.	
Pseudotorellia	P. cf. ensiformis	Agoult	Leaf	A ginkgoalean.	
Sulcatocladus	S. cf. robustus	Agoult	Shoot	A conifer.	
Welwitschiophyllum	W. sp.	Agoult	Leaf	A possible welsitschialean.	
