= Spratticeps =

Scientific classification
- Domain: Eukaryota
- Kingdom: Animalia
- Phylum: Chordata
- Class: Actinopterygii
- Superorder: Clupeomorpha
- Genus: †Spratticeps; Patterson, 1970

Type species
- †Spratticeps gaultinus Patterson, 1970

Extinct genus of fishes

Spratticeps is an extinct genus of clupeiform fish which existed in what is now England during the lower Cretaceous period. It contains the species Spratticeps gaultinus.
