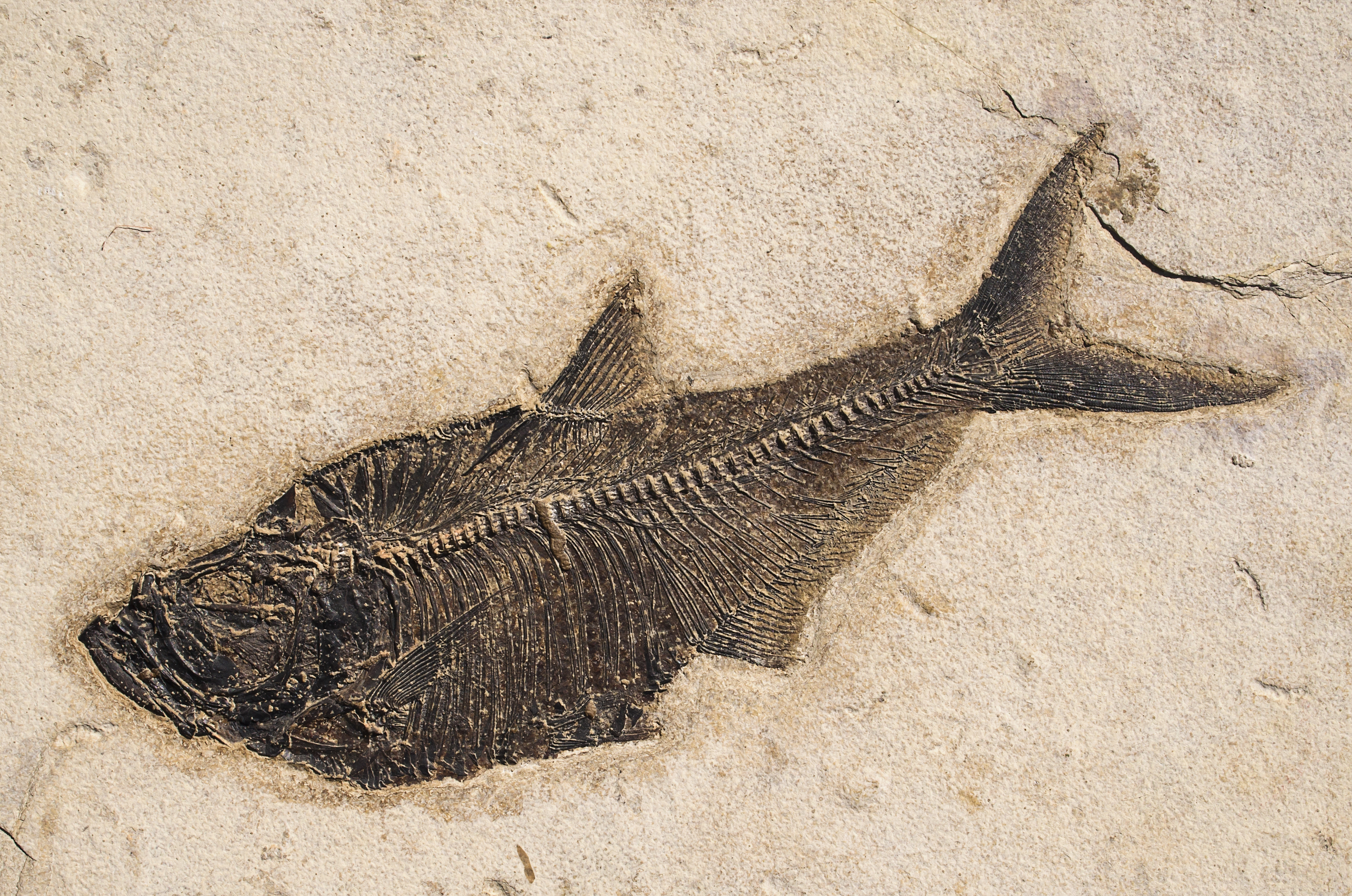
- D. dentatus from Eocene of Wyoming

Scientific classification
- Kingdom: Animalia
- Phylum: Chordata
- Class: Actinopterygii
- Order: †Ellimmichthyiformes
- Family: †Armigatidae
- Genus: †Diplomystus; Cope, 1877

Type species
- †Diplomystus dentatus Cope, 1877

Species
- See text

Synonyms
- Dyplomystus (sic)

= Diplomystus =

Diplomystus Temporal range: Late Cenomanian to Middle Eocene

Extinct genus of fishes

Diplomystus is an extinct genus of freshwater and marine clupeomorph fish distantly related to modern-day extant herrings, anchovies, and sardines. It is known from the United States, Canada, China, Uzbekistan and Lebanon from the Late Cretaceous to the middle Eocene. Many other clupeomorph species from around the world were also formerly placed in the genus, due to it being a former wastebasket taxon. It was among the last surviving members of the formerly-diverse order Ellimmichthyiformes, with only its close relative Guiclupea living for longer.

== Taxonomy ==
The genus contains the following species:

- D. birdi Woodward, 1895 – Late Cretaceous (Cenomanian) of Lebanon (Sannine Formation)
- D. dentatus Cope, 1877 – Early Eocene of Wyoming, USA (Green River Formation)
- D. dubertreti Signeux, 1951 – Late Cretaceous (Santonian) of Lebanon (Sahel Alma)
- D. shengliensis Zhang, Zhou & Qing, 1985 – Middle Eocene (Bartonian) of China (Shahejie Formation)

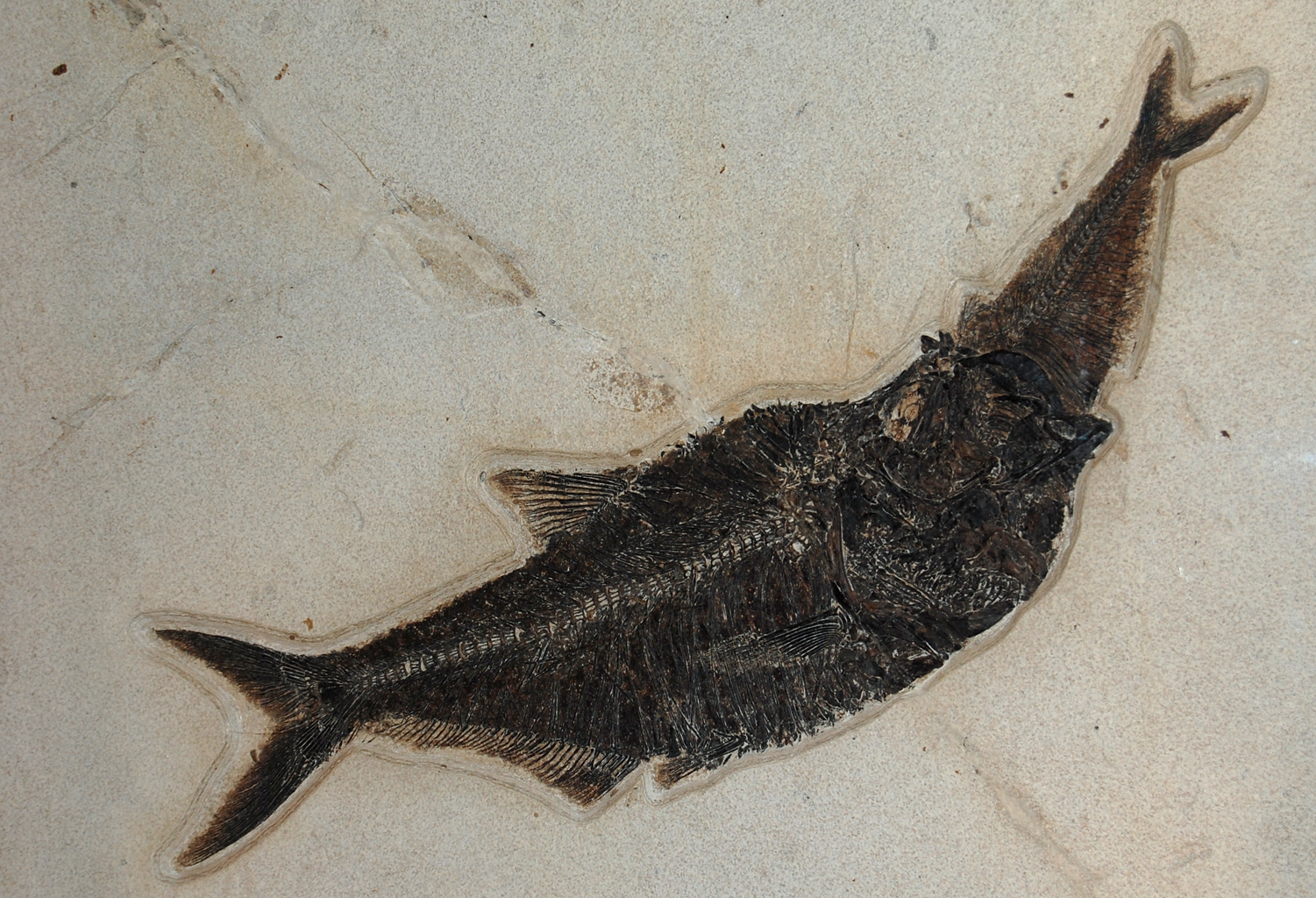
Specimen of D. dentatus swallowing a Knightia

The type species of the genus, and likely the most well-known ellimmichthyiform overall, is Diplomystus dentatus, due to its abundance in the famous lower Eocene lagerstätte of Fossil Butte National Monument, an exposure of the Green River Formation. They are also present but significantly less common in other members of the formation. The Green River Formation is the remnant of a large freshwater lake whose mud would eventually be transformed into soft calcite-bearing shale. Specimens of D. dentatus range from larval size to 65 cm, and reach their largest sizes in the Fossil Butte deposits. Some fossilized eggs are also known. D. dentatus was a voracious predator on smaller fishes and is commonly found in close association with the extinct clupeid Knightia. Many Diplomystus specimens are preserved with a Knightia lodged in their mouth, indicating that Diplomystus fed on the smaller clupeomorph despite it growing to nearly half the size of Diplomystus.

The freshwater species D. shengliensis is known from the slightly younger (Middle Eocene, likely Bartonian) Shahejie Formation of Shandong, China, where full specimens have been collected from boreholes. Despite occurring on the opposite side of the Pacific from the North American D. dentatus, it physically appears very similar to it. Due to the multiple freshwater fish genera shared by Asia & North America during the Paleogene, It has been suggested that a brief exposure of Beringia during the Late Paleocene and early Eocene may have allowed for a rapid dispersal event of Diplomystus and several other freshwater fish genera between both continents.

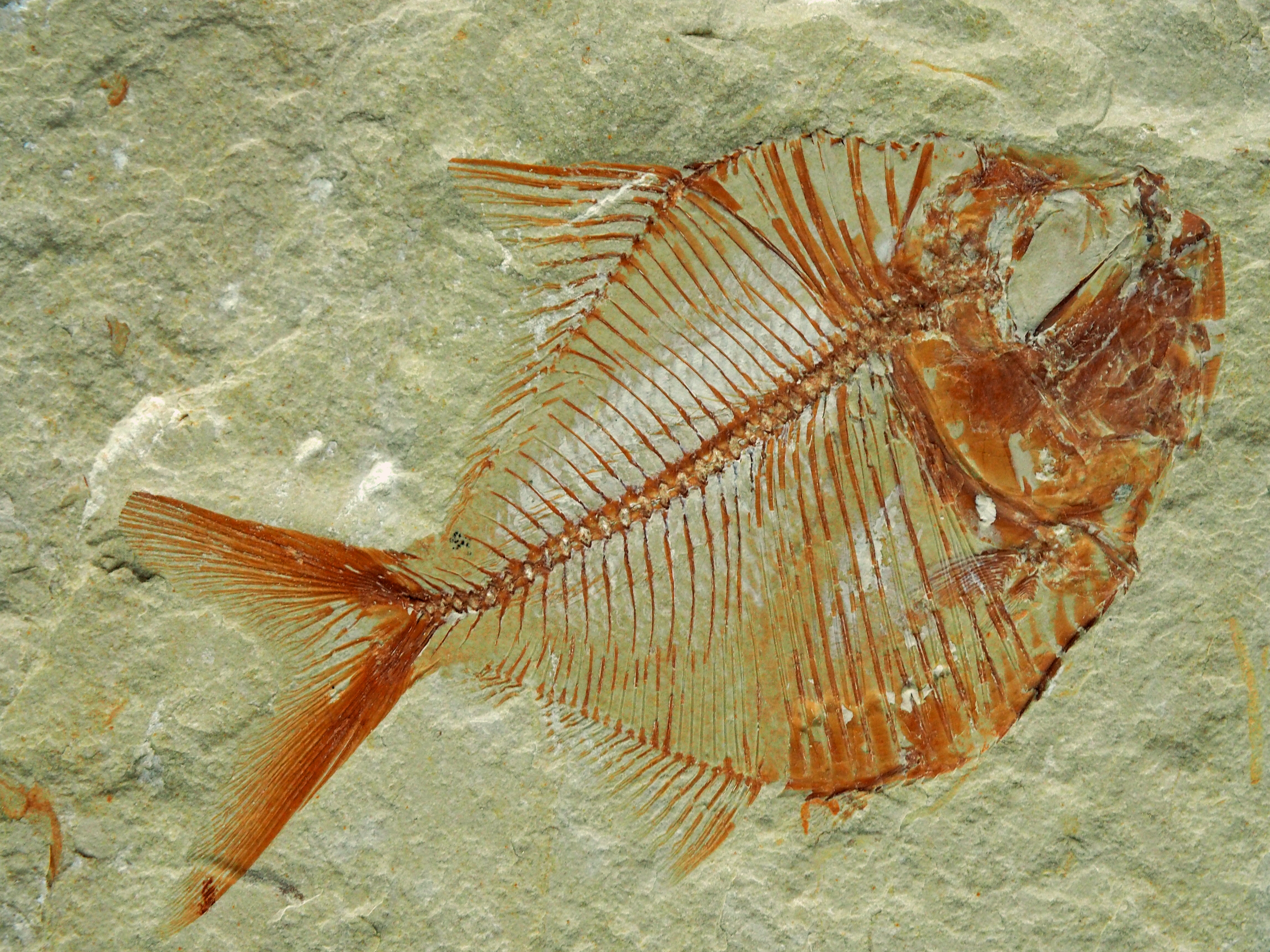
The mid-Cretaceous-aged, marine D. birdi from Lebanon

Two marine Diplomystus species, D. birdi and D. dubertreti, are known from Late Cretaceous-aged (Cenomanian and Santonian respectively) formations in Lebanon, and have much deeper bodies than the two Cenozoic freshwater species. Despite their differing habitat, distribution, appearance and much earlier occurrence, morphological analyses have found them to be the closest relatives to the two Eocene species.

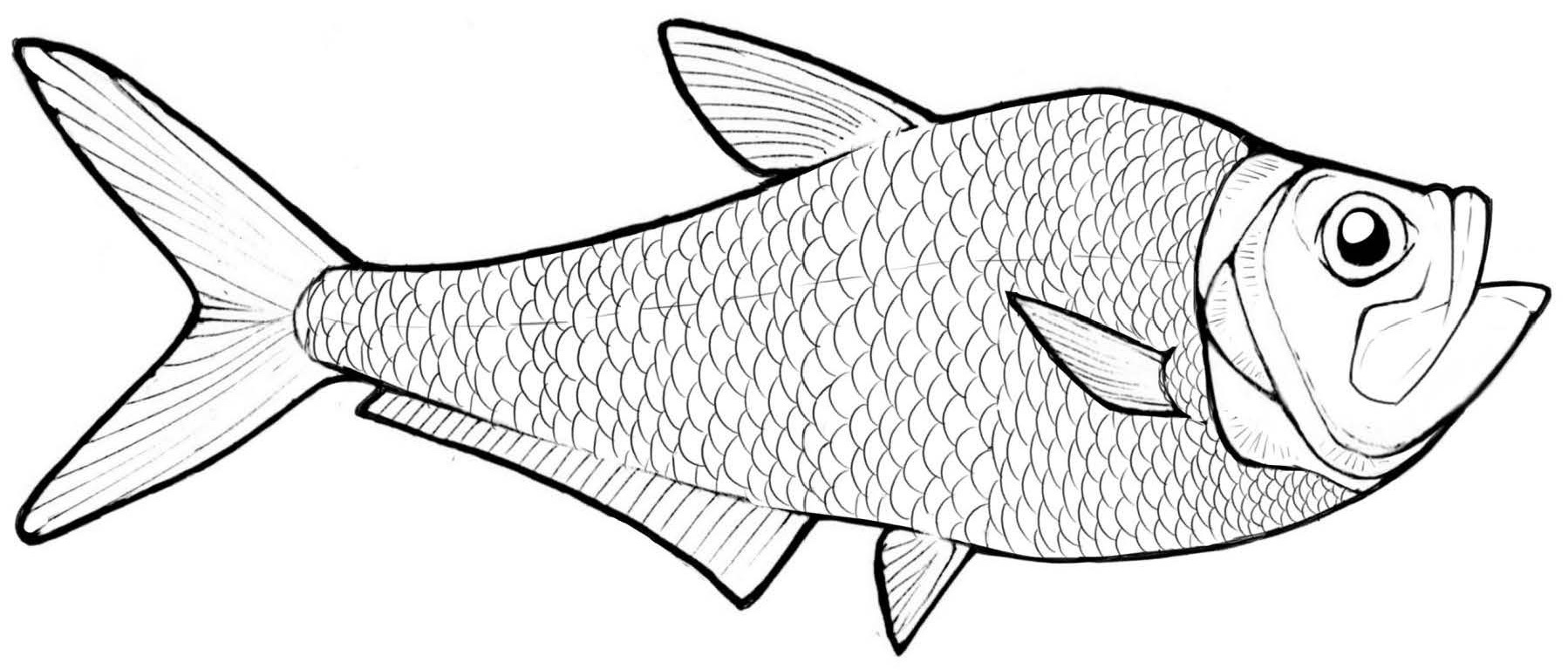
Life restoration of D. dentatus

Isolated vertebral centra of Diplomystus have been identified from the Early Eocene-aged Wasatch Formation of Wyoming, and these diagnostic vertebra have been used to identify earlier records of Diplomystus in the North American fossil record. Fossil Diplomystus vertebra have been identified in the Cenomanian-aged Dakota Formation of Utah, US, the Santonian-aged Straight Cliffs Formation of Utah, the Campanian-aged Belly River Group of Alberta, Canada, and the Early Paleocene-aged Ravenscrag Formation of Saskatchewan, Canada. These suggest that Diplomystus was widespread in freshwater habitats of North America from the mid-Cretaceous to the Eocene, and even survived the Cretaceous-Paleogene extinction event in these habitats. Outside of North America, fossil vertebrae have also been identified from the Turonian-aged Bissekty Formation of Uzbekistan.

The closest relative of Diplomystus was Guiclupea, an Oligocene genus from China and the last known ellimmichthyiform overall. Despite its late occurrence, a reconstructed phylogeny suggests it likely diverged from Diplomystus during the Early Cretaceous.

=== Former species ===
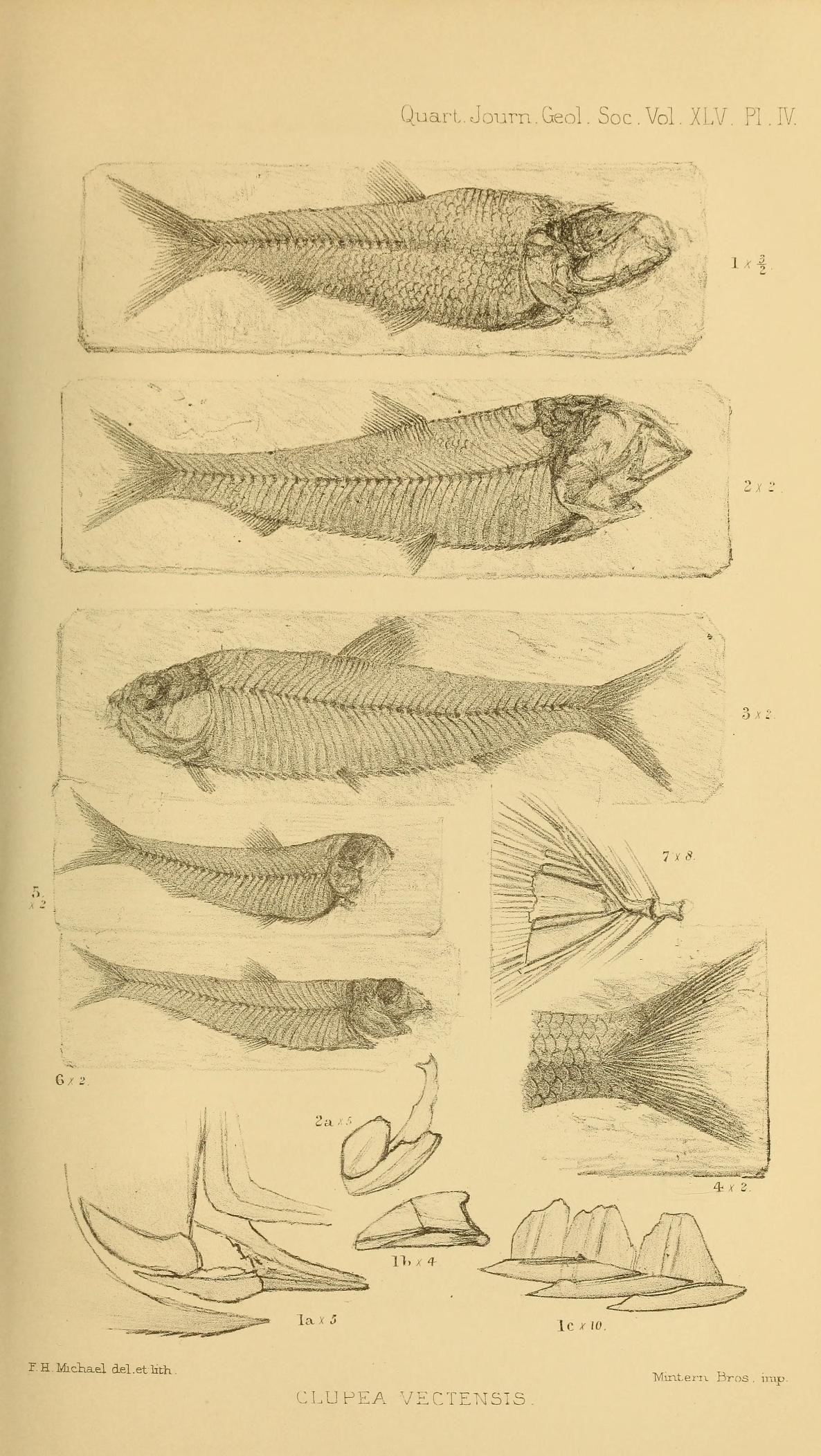
"D." vectensis (now Vectichthys), a former species from the Isle of Wight

Diplomystus was formerly used as a wastebasket taxon for many different species of fossil clupeomorphs.

A trio of Early Cretaceous (late Valanginian to early Barremian-aged) freshwater species that inhabited lakes in what is now Japan and Korea (D. altiformis Yabumoto, 1994, D. kokuraensis Uyeno, 1979, and D. primotinus Uyeno, 1979) were previously placed in this genus, but morphological studies indicate that they are not true members of Diplomystus; however, they have not yet been reclassified. These species are abundant enough to lend their names to an entire species assemblage (the "Diplomystus-Wakinoichthys Fauna"). Another tentatively assigned species, D. trebecianensis Bannikov & Sorbini, 2000 from the Early Paleocene of Italy is among the last known marine ellimmichthyiforms, but likely does not belong to Diplomystus. The species D. coverhamensis from the Late Cretaceous of New Zealand is considered an indeterminate clupeomorph.

The species D. soligacni Gaudant & Gaudant, 1971 from the Late Cretaceous of Tunisia was previously assigned to this genus, but is now placed in Paraclupea. The former species D. dartevellei Casier, 1965 from the Cenomanian of the Democratic Republic of the Congo is now placed in its own genus, Kwangoclupea. The Early Cretaceous species D. longicostatus from Brazil and D. goodi from Equatorial Guinea are placed in Ellimmichthys. The species D. elatus from Italy is now placed in Armigatus. The species D. vectensis from the Late Eocene of the Isle of Wight is now placed in Vectichthys. The species D. marmorensis from the Miocene of Turkey is now thought to belong to Clupeonella.

== Bibliography ==
- Grande, Lance (1982). "A revision of the fossil genus Diplomystus: with comments on the interrelationships of clupeomorph fishes". American Museum Novitates (2728). New York: American Museum of Natural History. hdl:2246/5342.
- Nelson, Gareth J. (1973). "Notes on the structure and relationships of certain Cretaceous and Eocene teleostean fishes". American Museum Novitates (2524). New York: American Museum of Natural History. hdl:2246/2730.
- Zhang, Miman; John G. Maisey (2003). "Redescription of †Ellimma branneri and †Diplomystus shengliensis, and Relationships of Some Basal Clupeomorphs". American Museum Novitates (3404). New York: American Museum of Natural History. hdl:2246/2830.
