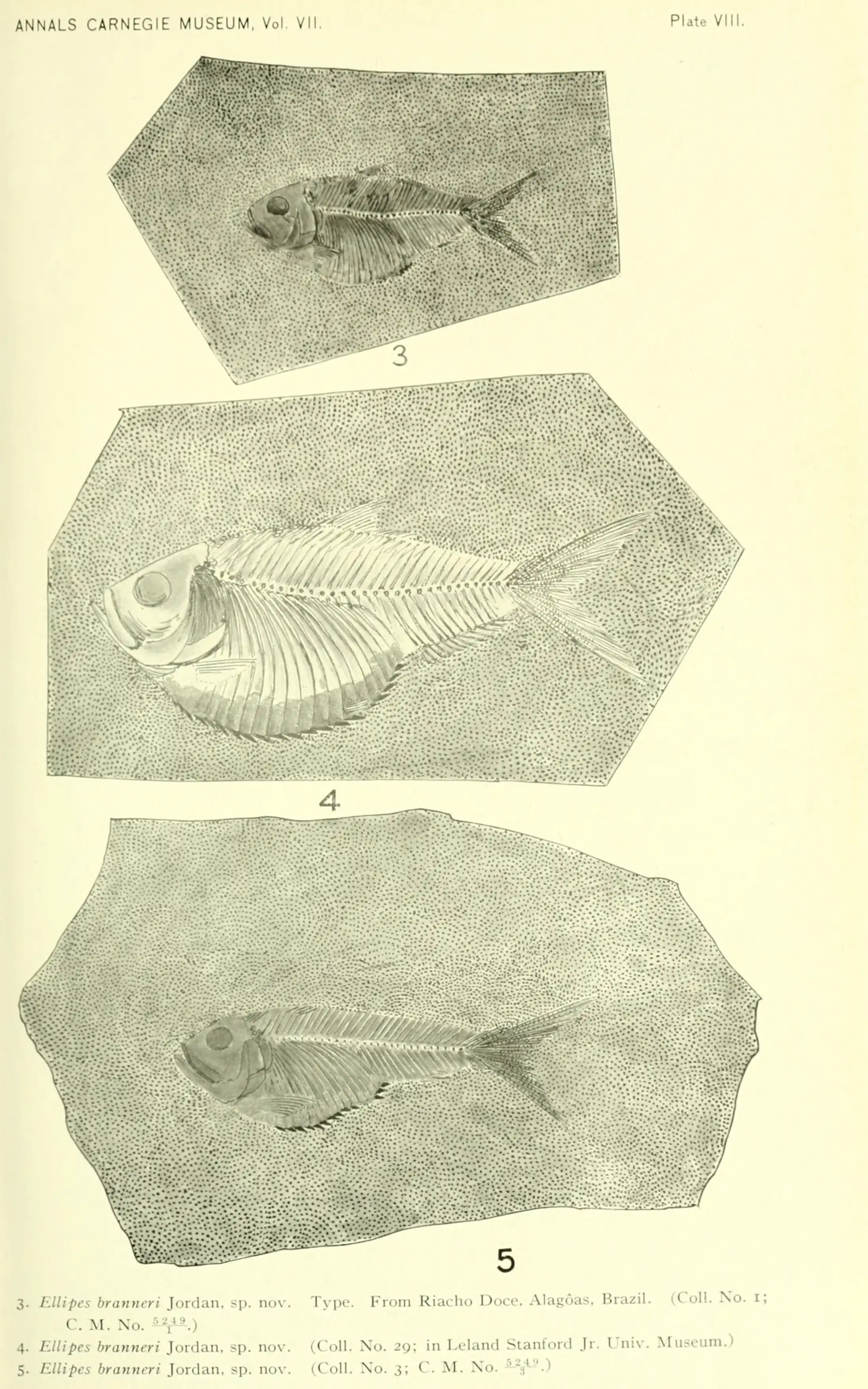
- Fossil specimens of E. branneri

Scientific classification
- Kingdom: Animalia
- Phylum: Chordata
- Class: Actinopterygii
- Division: Teleostei
- Order: †Ellimmichthyiformes
- Family: †Paraclupeidae
- Genus: †Ellimma; Jordan, 1913

Species
- E. branneri (Jordan, 1910); E. longipectoralis Polck et al 2020

Synonyms
- Ellipes Jordan, 1910 (preocc.)

= Ellimma =

Ellimma Temporal range: Aptian

Ellimma is an extinct genus of freshwater clupeomorph fish belonging to the order Ellimmichthyiformes. It was a distant relative of modern herrings and anchovies. Fossil remains are known from the Early Cretaceous of South America.

Two species are known:

- E. branneri (Jordan, 1910) (type species) - Early Cretaceous (Aptian) of Alagoas, Brazil (Muribeca Formation) (=Ellipes branneri Jordan, 1910)
- E. longipectoralis Polck et al.., 2020 - Aptian of offshore southeastern Brazil (Barra Velha Formation of Santos Basin)

The species E. longicostatus, initially placed in Diplomystus and reclassified in Ellimma in 1910, was reclassified in Ellimmichthys in 1919. However, the genus Ellimma as a whole may be paraphyletic with respect to Ellimmichthys, as some phylogenies show both species in both genera being sister to one another. The species E. cruzae from the Cabo Formation of Brazil is now placed in its own genus, Caboellimma. The species E. elmodenae from the Late Miocene of California, US, initially also placed in Ellimma by Jordan, is now placed in the true herring genus Xyrinius.

The genus was originally described as Ellipes in 1910, with three species being placed in it: E. longicostatus (previously described as Diplomystus longicostatus in 1886 by Edward Drinker Cope) as well as two new species, E. branneri and E. riacensis (the latter now considered synonymous with E. branneri). In 1913, it was noted that the genus name was already preoccupied by Ellipes, a modern genus of orthopteran insect, and it was thus renamed Ellimma. In 1919, Jordan noted the significant morphological differences between E. branneri and E. longicostatus, most notably the sharply elevated back of the latter, and placed the latter species in the new genus Ellimmichthys.

The species E. longipectoralis was described from nearly complete fossil specimens within a drill core from oil exploration, recovered 200 kilometres (120 miles) offshore at a depth of 5,500 metres (18,000 ft) below sea level. It represents the first articulated vertebrate specimen known from the offshore Santos Basin and a significant southwards range extension for the genus. It appears to have inhabited an alkaline shallow lake environment.
