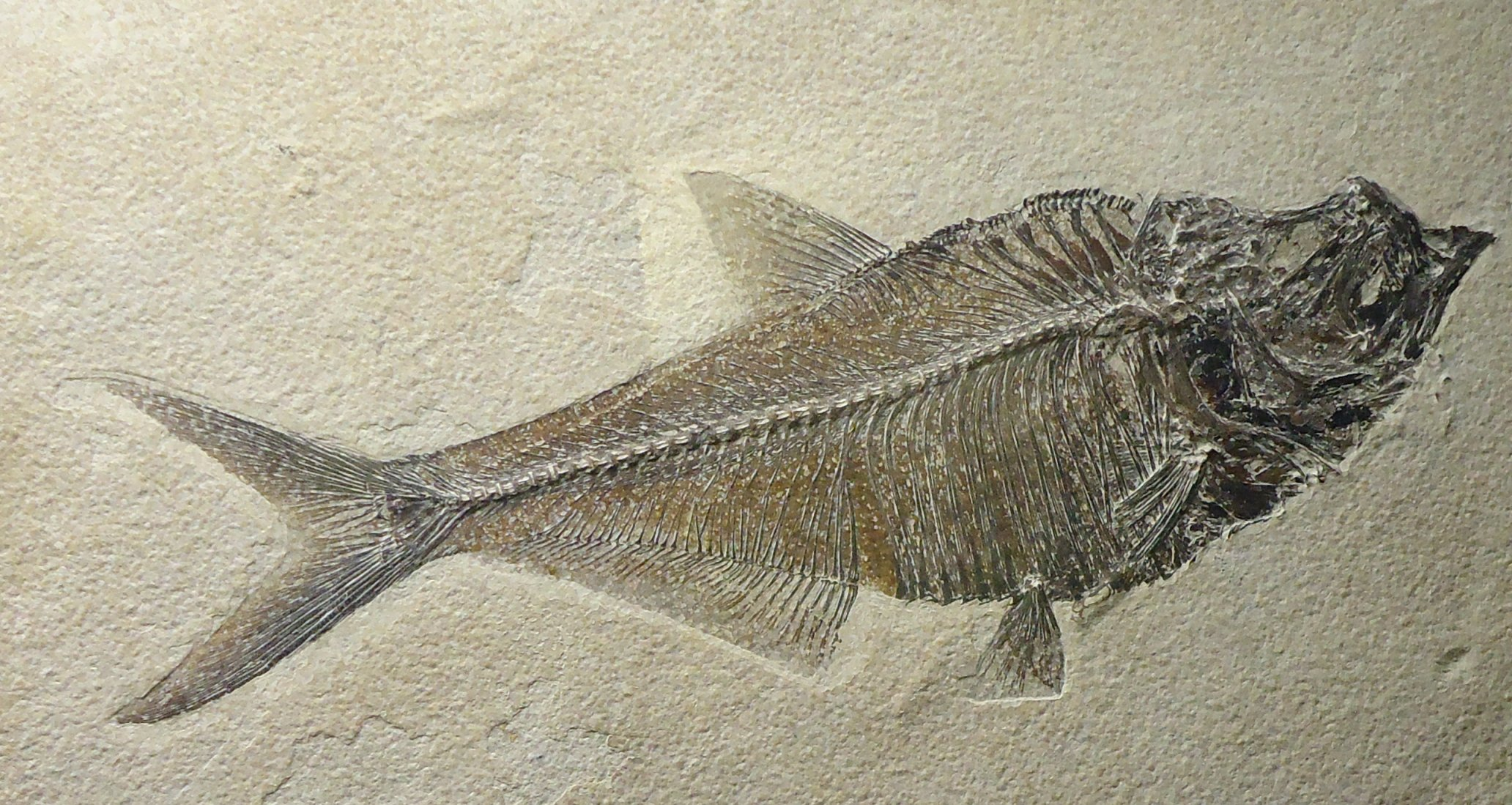
- Diplomystus dentatus from Wyoming
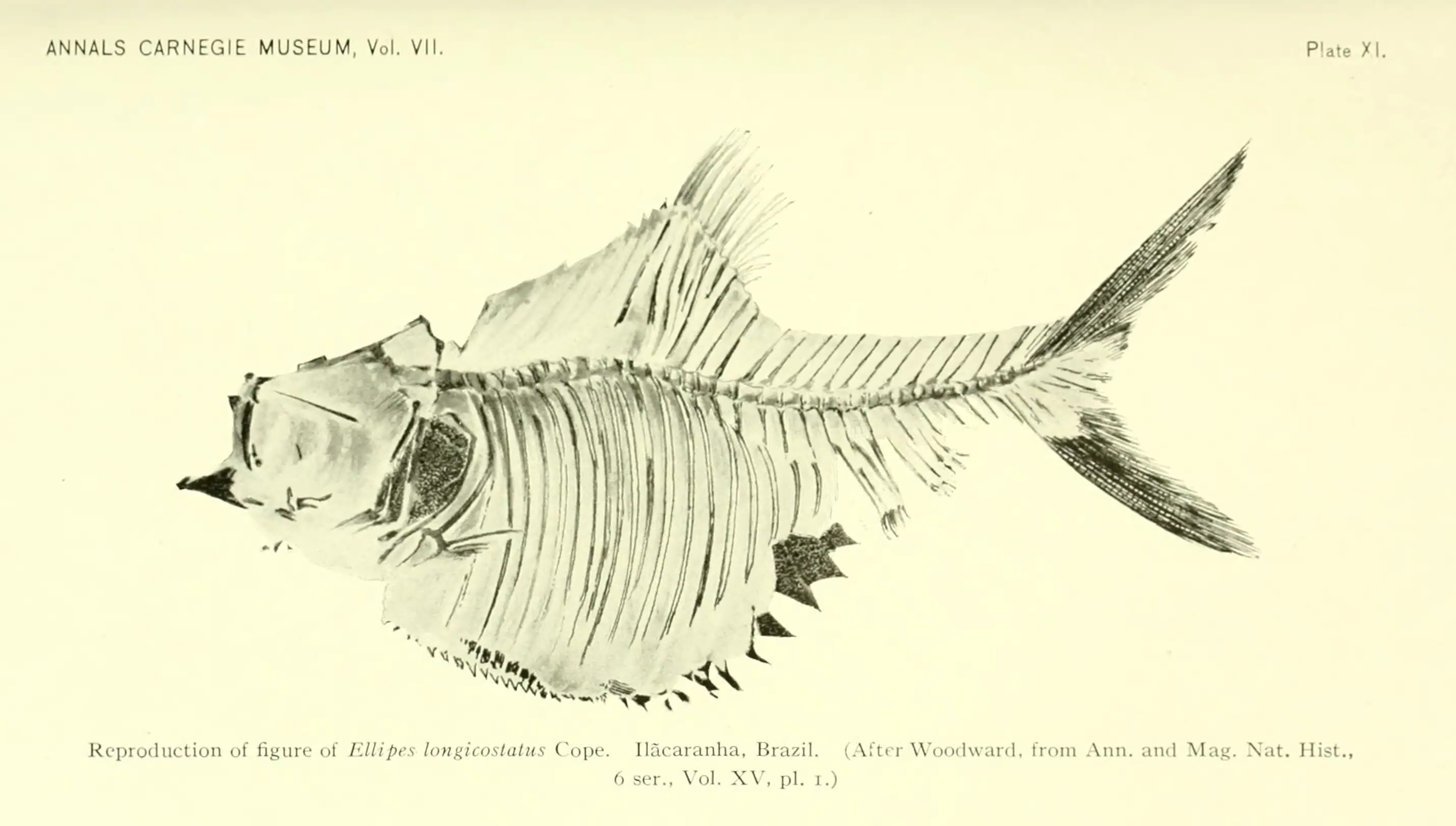
- Ellimmichthys from Brazil, the type genus of the order

Scientific classification
- Kingdom: Animalia
- Phylum: Chordata
- Class: Actinopterygii
- Division: Teleostei
- Superorder: Clupeomorpha
- Order: †Ellimmichthyiformes; Grande, 1982

Type genus
- †Ellimmichthys Jordan, 1919

Families
- †Ancashichthyidae; †Armigatidae; †Gasteroclupeidae; †Paraclupeidae; †Scutatuspinosidae; †Sorbinichthyidae

= Ellimmichthyiformes =

Ellimmichthyiformes Temporal range: Late Jurassic to Late Oligocene

Extinct order of fishes

The Ellimmichthyiformes, also known as double-armored herrings, are an extinct order of ray-finned fish known from the Late Jurassic to the Oligocene. They were the sister group to the extant true herrings, shad and anchovies in the order Clupeiformes, with both orders belonging to the suborder Clupeomorpha. Some studies suggest that the order may be potentially paraphyletic with respect to crown-group Clupeiformes, although more comprehensive studies support them as being a monophyletic group.

A highly successful group throughout the Cretaceous, they were found worldwide and are known to have inhabited both marine and freshwater habitats. They appear to have been a largely marine group for most of their history, with the first freshwater lineages appearing during the Late Cretaceous. In 2026, the Ancashichthyidae, the earliest known ellimmichthyiforms (and clupeomorphs as a whole), were described from the Late Jurassic of Peru.

The discovery of the Ancashichthyiedae suggests that like many other fish lineages, the Ellimmichthyiformes may have originated around South America. Shortly after the first major radiation of the Ellimmichthyiformes in the Early Cretaceous, the Mediterranean portion of the Tethys Ocean appears to have been a major center of diversification for them, as the majority of fossils of this group are known from there. Following this, they saw an explosion in diversity during the Cenomanian, possibly due to the high sea levels of the Tethys at the time and the resulting impact on geography and food distribution, with the group evolving numerous different body plans. However, they were devastated by the Cretaceous–Paleogene extinction event and saw a drastic reduction in range. Only a few freshwater species in the genera Diplomystus and Guiclupea survived primarily in North America and China (although the unusual Gasteroclupea of South America appears to have briefly survived into the Paleocene), including Diplomystus dentatus of the famous Green River Formation. A few marine lineages survived in the Tethys Ocean near modern Italy, such as "Diplomystus" trebicianensis in the Paleocene and Eoellimmichthys, the last marine ellimmichthyiform, during the Eocene. The last surviving ellimmichthyiform, Guiclupea superstes, was a freshwater species that occurred in southern China during the Oligocene, representing the youngest member of the group.

== Taxonomy ==
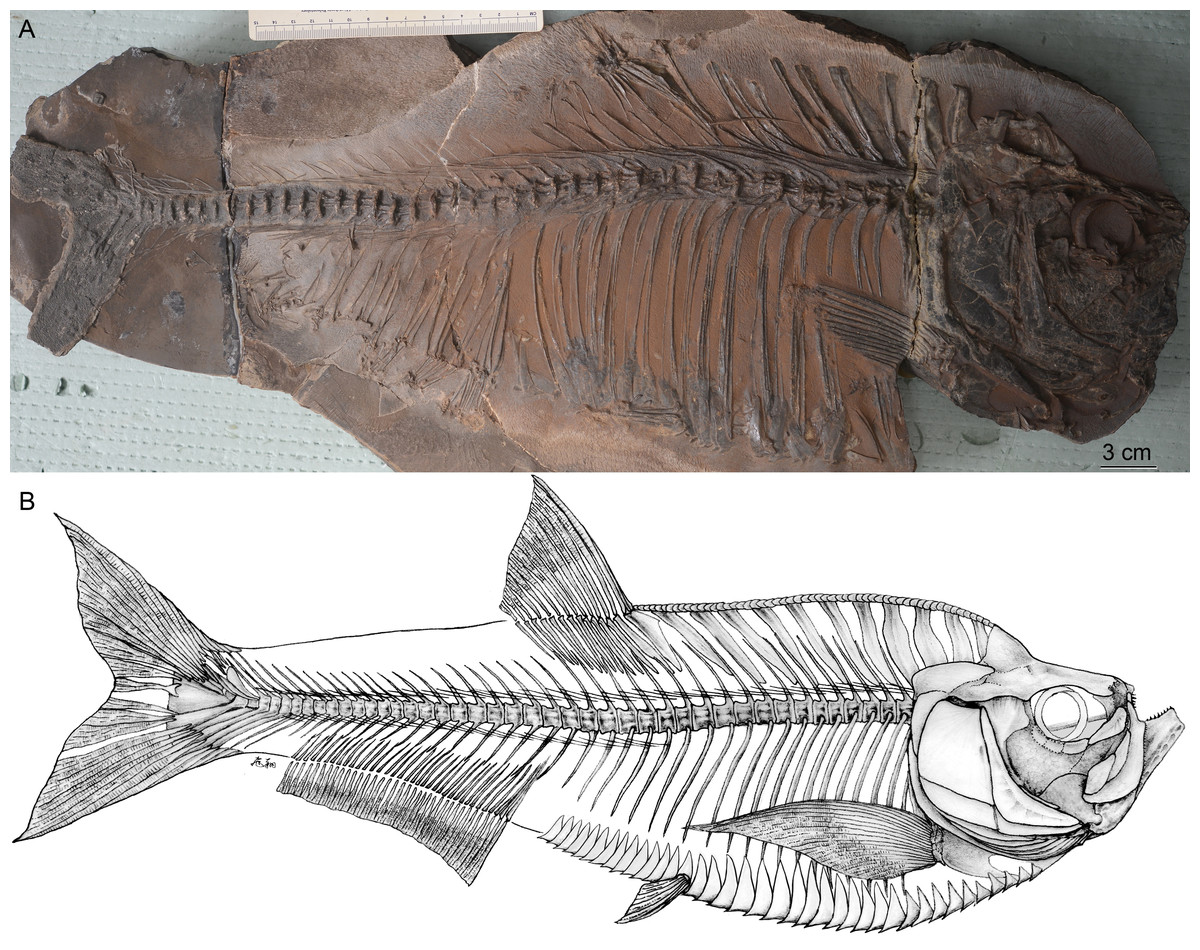
Guiclupea from China, the last surviving ellimmichthyiform

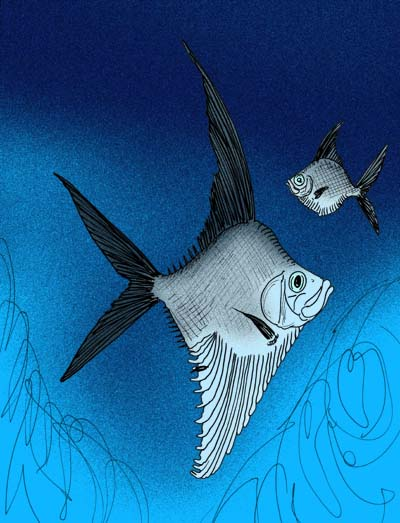
Life restoration of the bizarre Rhombichthys from Palestine

Based on Marramà & Carnevale (2026), in taxonomic order, with additions where relevant:

- Genus †Codoichthys Silva Santos, 1994
- Genus †Horseshoeichthys Newbrey, Murray, Brinkman, Wilson & Neuman, 2010
- Family †Ancashichthyidae Ordóñez, Arratia, Tejada & Chacaltana, 2026
  - Genus †Aijaichthys Ordóñez, Arratia, Tejada & Chacaltana, 2026
  - Genus †Ancashichthys Ordóñez, Arratia, Tejada & Chacaltana, 2026
- Family †Sorbinichthyidae Bannikov & Bacchia, 2000
  - Genus †Sorbinichthys Bannikov & Bacchia, 2000
- Family †Scutatuspinosidae Silva Santos & Silva Corréa, 1985
  - Genus †Foreyclupea Vernygora, Murray & Wilson, 2016
  - Genus †Scutatuspinosus Silva Santos & Correa, 1985
  - Genus †Ranulfoichthys Alvarado-Ortega, 2014
  - Genus †Ornategulum Forey, 1973
- Family †Gasteroclupeidae Signeux, 1964
  - Genus †Diplomystus Cope, 1877
  - Genus †Guiclupea Chen, Chang, Wu & Liao, 2018
  - Genus †Gasteroclupea Signeux, 1964
- Family †Armigatidae Murray & Wilson, 2013
  - Genus †Armigatus Grande, 1982
  - Genus ?†Pugliaclupea Taverne, 2004
- Family †Paraclupeidae Chang & Chou, 1977
  - Genus †Caboellimma de Figueiredo & Gallo, 2023
  - Genus ?†Kwangoclupea Taverne, 1997
  - Subfamily †Thorectichthyinae Murray & Wilson, 2013
    - Genus †Thorectichthys Murray & Wilson, 2013
  - Subfamily †Eoellimmichthyinae Marramà & Carnevale, 2026
    - Genus †Eoellimmichthys Marramà, Bannikov, Kriwet & Carnevale, 2018
    - Genus †Ezkutuberezi Poyato-Ariza, Lopez-Horgue & García-Garmilla, 2000
  - Subfamily †Triplomystinae Murray & Wilson, 2013
    - Genus †Triplomystus Forey, Yi, Patterson & Davies, 2003
    - Genus †Scutatoclupea Bannikov, 2015
  - Genus †Paraclupeinae Chang & Chou, 1977
    - Genus †Ellimma Jordan, 1913
    - Genus †Ellimmichthys Jordan, 1919
    - Genus †Paraclupea Sun, 1956
    - Genus †Rhombichthys Khalloufi, Zaragüeta-Bagils & Lelièvre, 2010
    - Genus †Tunisiaclupea Boukhalfa, Wu, Ben Ali & Fang, 2019
    - Genus †Tycheroichthys Hay, Cumbaa, Murray & Plint, 2007

Prior to the 2026 revision, Ellimmichthyiformes was treated as comprising 3 suborders (Armigatoidei with Armigatidae, Sorbinichthyioidei with Sorbinichthyidae & Gasteroclupeidae, and Ellimmichthyoidei with Paraclupeidae), a division now known to be paraphyletic.
