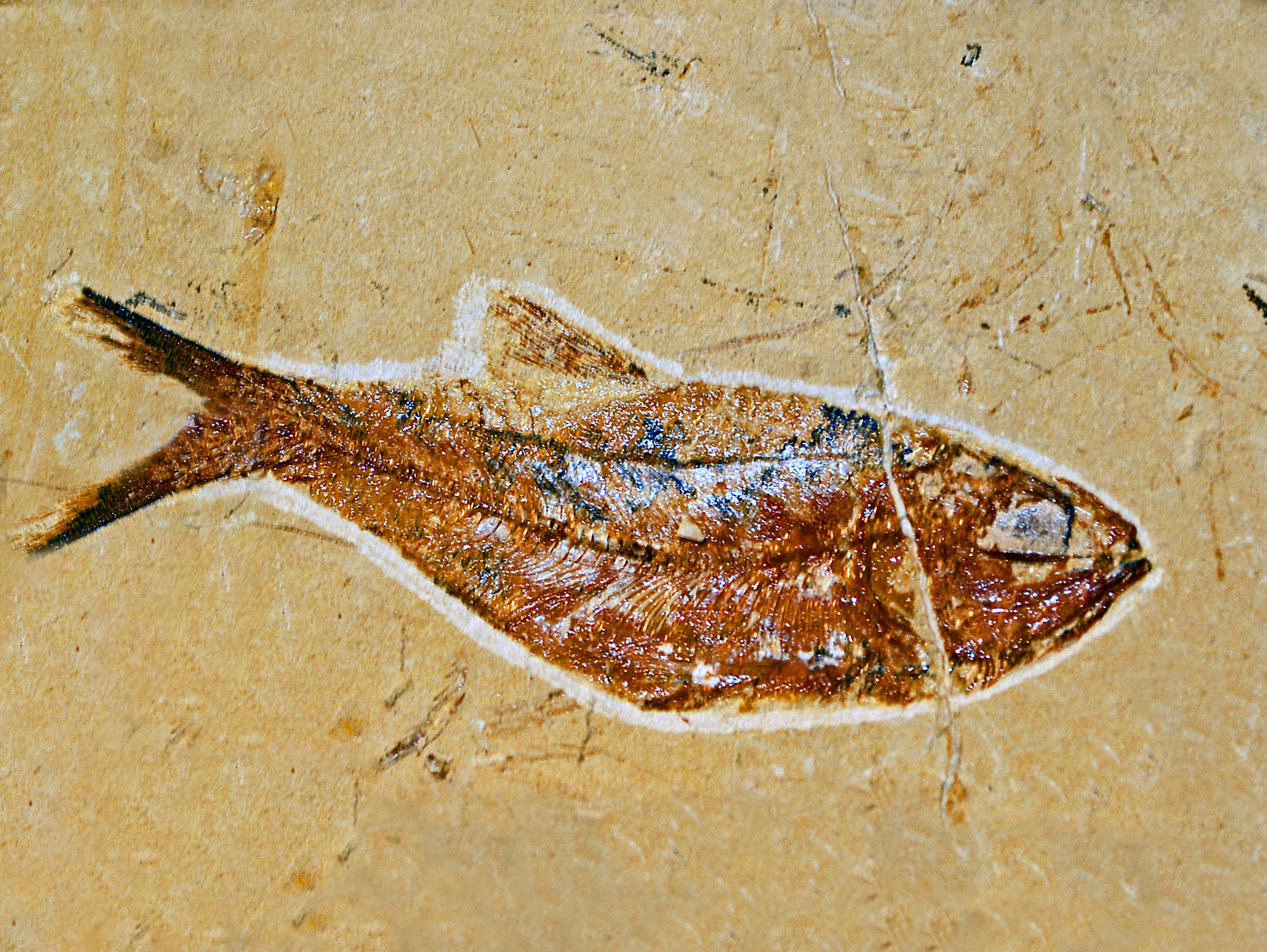
- Fossil of A. brevissimus from Lebanon

Scientific classification
- Kingdom: Animalia
- Phylum: Chordata
- Class: Actinopterygii
- Order: †Ellimmichthyiformes
- Family: †Armigatidae
- Genus: †Armigatus; Grande, 1982

Type species
- †Clupea brevissimus Blainville, 1818

Species
- See text

= Armigatus =

Armigatus Temporal range: Hauterivian/Barremian to Campanian

Extinct genus of fishes

Armigatus is an extinct genus of marine clupeomorph fishes belonging to the order Ellimmichthyiformes. These fishes lived in the Cretaceous (Albian to Campanian, about 103-72 million years ago); their fossil remains have been found in Mexico, Europe, the Middle East and North Africa, suggesting the genus ranged across the Tethys Sea.

== Etymology ==
The Latin generic epithet Armigatus, means bearer of armor. The specific epithet brevissimus signifies "shortest, smallest".

== Description ==
Armigatus has an osteoglossid-like tooth patch, a large foramen in the anterior ceratohyal and a series of subtriangular dorsal scutes, giving rise to their scientific name.

== Species ==
- †A. alticorpus Forey et al., 2003 from Namoura and Hakel, of the Sannine Formation in Lebanon.
- †A. brevissimus (Blainville, 1818), the type species, from the Cenomanian of Lebanon (Hakel and Hajula in the Sannine Formation), Italy (Sicily), Slovenia (Komen), and Germany (Hesseltal Formation). Type species.
- †A. carrenoae Alvarado-Ortega et al., 2020 from the Albian Tlayua Formation of Mexico.
- †A. dalmaticus Murray et al., 2016 from the Campanian deposits of Dalmatia, Croatia.
- †A. elatus (Costa, 1850) from the Albian Pietraroja Plattenkalk of Italy (=Histiurus elatus Costa, 1850)
- †A. felixi Than-Marchese et al., 2022 from the Albian Tlayua Formation of Mexico.
- †A. namourensis Forey et al., 2003 from Namoura, of the Sannine Formation in Lebanon.
- †A. oligodentatus Vernygora and Murray, 2016 from the Cenomanian/early Turonian Akrabou Formation of Morocco.
- †A. plinii Marramà & Carnevale, 2023 from the Albian Pietraroja Plattenkalk of Italy
- †A. simonettoi Amalfitano et al., 2025 from the late Hauterivian–early Barremian Grivò Flysch of Italy
