= Ranulfoichthys =

Ranulfoichthys Temporal range: Albian

Scientific classification
- Kingdom: Animalia
- Phylum: Chordata
- Class: Actinopterygii
- Superorder: Clupeomorpha
- Genus: †Ranulfoichthys
- Species: †R. dorsonudum

Binomial name
- †Ranulfoichthys dorsonudum Alvarado-Ortega, 2014

Extinct species of herring

Ranulfoichthys is an extinct genus of clupeomorph that lived during the Albian stage of the Early Cretaceous epoch.

== Distribution ==
Ranulfoichthys dorsonudum is known from the Tlayúa Quarry of Puebla, Mexico.
