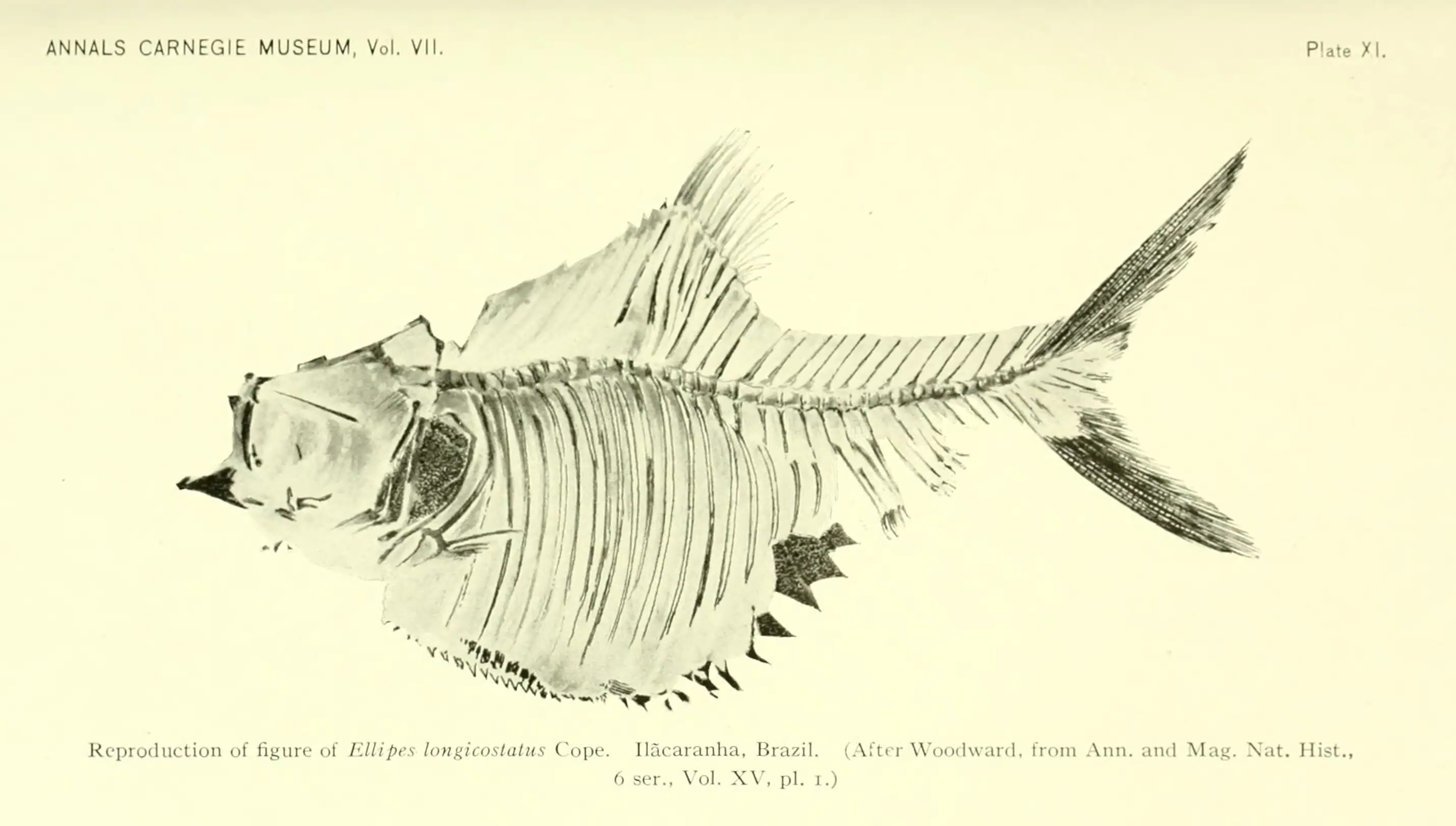
- Type specimen of E. longicostatus

Scientific classification
- Kingdom: Animalia
- Phylum: Chordata
- Class: Actinopterygii
- Order: †Ellimmichthyiformes
- Family: †Paraclupeidae
- Genus: †Ellimmichthys; Jordan, 1919

Type species
- †Diplomystus longicostatus Cope, 1886

Species
- †E. longicostatus (Cope, 1886); †E. goodi (Eastman, 1912); †E. spinosus de Figuereido & Gallo, 2021

= Ellimmichthys =

Ellimmichthys Temporal range: Berriasian/Valanginian–Aptian/Albian

Extinct genus of fishes

Ellimmichthys is an extinct genus of freshwater clupeomorph fish belonging to the order Ellimmichthyiformes, of which it is the type genus. It was a distant relative of modern herrings and anchovies. It inhabited freshwater rift lakes in the supercontinent of West Gondwana (comprising modern South America and Africa) during the Early Cretaceous, and fossil remains are known from formations in both South America (Brazil) and Africa (Equatorial Guinea).

This genus can be distinguished from its relatives by the prominent raised area on its back below the dorsal fin.

== Taxonomy ==
The following species are known:

- †E. longicostatus (Cope, 1886) - Berriasian/Valanginian of Bahia, Brazil (Candeias Formation) (=Diplomystus longicostatus Cope, 1886) (type species)
- †E. goodi (Eastman, 1912) - Aptian/Albian of Equatorial Guinea (Cocobeach Formation) (=Diplomystus goodi Eastman, 1912, D. elberti Weiler, 1922, Ellimma guineensis Gayet, 1989)
- †E. spinosus de Figuereido & Gallo, 2021 - Berriasian/Valanginian of Bahia, Brazil (Candeias Formation)

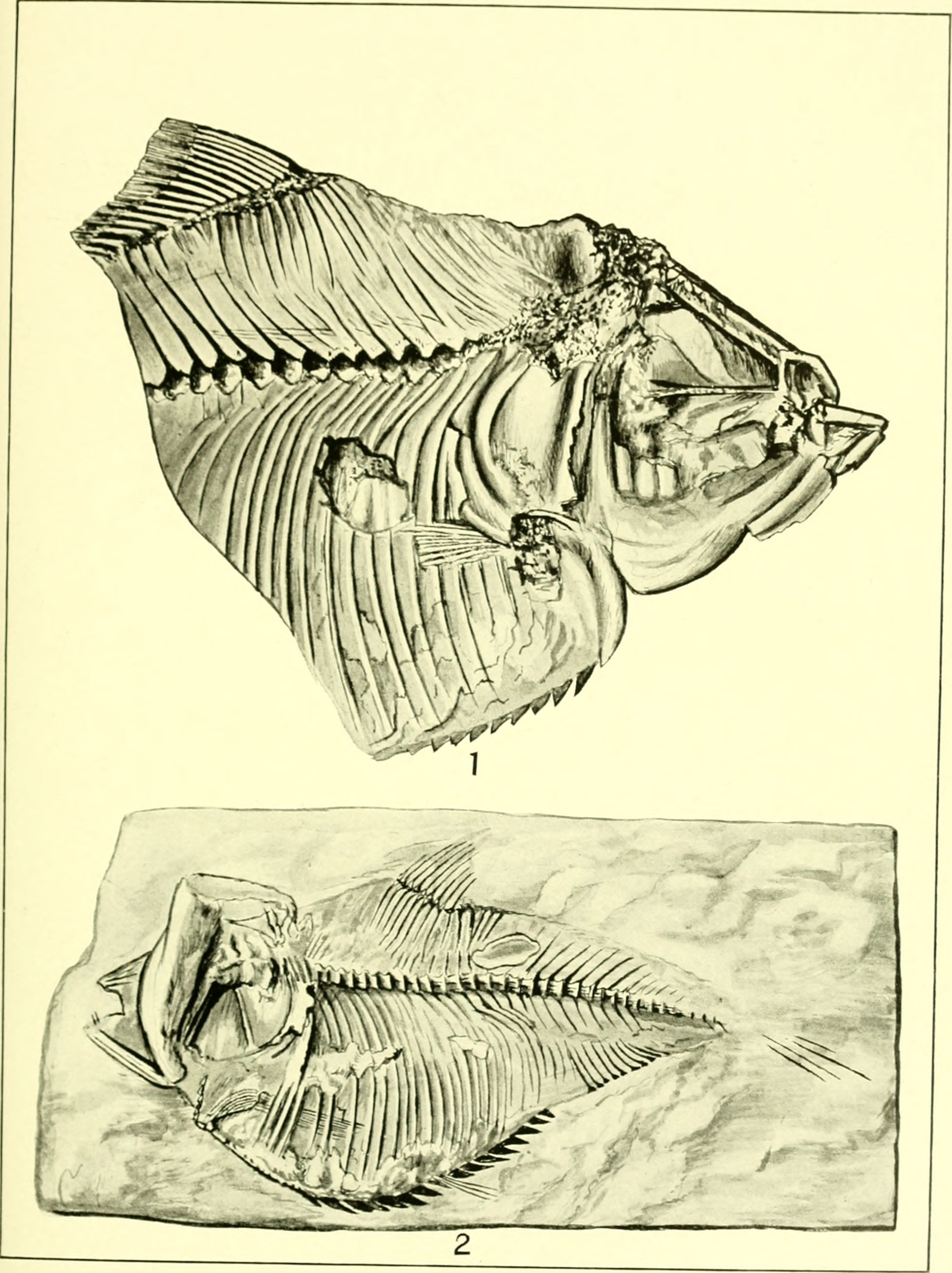
Specimen of E. goodi

Another species E. maceioensis Malabarba et al, 2004 from the Aptian-aged Maceió Formation of Alagoas, Brazil likely does not belong to this genus as it does not display diagnostic morphological characteristics. However, the genus as a whole may also be paraphyletic with respect to Ellimma.

The sister genus to Ellimmichthys is thought to be Eoellimmichthys, a marine paraclupeid that lived much later during the Early Eocene, with fossils known from Monte Bolca, Italy. Eoellimmichthys is thought to have been the last surviving paraclupeid, and the last surviving marine ellimmichthyiform as a whole.
