= Haimirichia =

Haimirichia Temporal range: Cenomanian to Turonian
- Articulated partial skeleton from the Akrabou Formation

Scientific classification
- Kingdom: Animalia
- Phylum: Chordata
- Class: Chondrichthyes
- Subclass: Elasmobranchii
- Division: Selachii
- Order: Lamniformes
- Family: †Haimirichiidae
- Genus: †Haimirichia; Vullo, Guinot, & Barbe, 2016

Type species
- Odontaspis amonensis Cappetta and Case, 1975

Prehistoric shark genus

Haimirichia is an extinct genus of mackerel shark from the late Cenomanian epoch of the Cretaceous period. It currently contains a single species: H. amonensis. Teeth now assigned to this genus were originally attributed to the genus Odontaspis. Exquisitely preserved remains from the Akrabou Formation Lagerstätte in Agoult, Morocco allowed the species to be moved into a new genus and family. Microscopic study revealed specialized dermal denticles likely used in electroreception. Its tooth and head design suggest a lifestyle similar to the extant Whitetip reef shark, a novel one for Lamniformes. Roulletia has a similar tooth design and may be part of the same family, Haimirichiidae.
