= Pseudoellimma =

Pseudoellimma Temporal range: Barremian

Scientific classification
- Domain: Eukaryota
- Kingdom: Animalia
- Phylum: Chordata
- Class: Actinopterygii
- Order: Clupeiformes
- Genus: †Pseudoellimma; De Figueiredo 2009

Type species
- †Pseudoellimma gallae De Figueiredo, 2009

Extinct species of fish

Pseudoellimma gallae is an extinct species of clupeiform fish which existed in the Coqueiro Seco Formation, Brazil during the early Cretaceous period. It was described by Francisco J. De Figueiredo in 2009, in a new genus, Pseudoellimma.
