= Roulletia =

Roulletia Temporal range: Cenomanian
- Teeth from the upper Cenomanian of France

Scientific classification
- Domain: Eukaryota
- Kingdom: Animalia
- Phylum: Chordata
- Class: Chondrichthyes
- Subclass: Elasmobranchii
- Division: Selachii
- Order: Lamniformes
- Family: †Haimirichiidae
- Genus: †Roulletia; Vullo, Cappetta, & Néraudeau, 2007

Type species
- †Roulletia bureaui Vullo et al. 2007

Species
- †Roulletia bureaui Vullo et al. 2007; †Roulletia canadensis Underwood and Cumbaa 2010

Extinct genus of sharks

Roulletia is an extinct genus of sharks in the family Haimirichiidae. It was described by Romain Vullo, Henri Cappetta, and Didier Néraudeau in 2007, and the type species is R. bureaui, which existed during the upper Cenomanian of what is now France. The genus was named after its type locality, Roullet-Saint-Estèphe, while the species epithet honours Michel Bureau, an amateur paleontologist who gathered the material for the species. Another species, R. canadensis, was described from the Cenomanian of Canada by Charlie J. Underwood and Stephen L. Cumbaa in 2010. The species epithet refers to the country in which it was discovered. It has been suggested tentatively this genus may be related to Haimirichia, which has been placed in its own family (Haimirichiidae) based on soft-tissue preservation.
