= Clupeomorpha =

Clupeomorpha Temporal range: Late Jurassic to present
- Atlantic herring (Clupea harengus)

Scientific classification
- Kingdom: Animalia
- Phylum: Chordata
- Class: Actinopterygii
- Division: Teleostei
- Cohort: Otocephala
- Superorder: Clupeomorpha; Greenwood, Rosen, Weitzman & Myers, 1966

Orders
- see text

Superorder of fishes

Clupeomorpha is a superorder of ray-finned fish which belongs to the clade Otocephala. Represented today only by the diverse, economically-important order Clupeiformes (containing herrings, anchovies and allies), it was formerly even more diverse, with the extinct order Ellimmichthyiformes also known. Fossil records of this group date back to the Tithonian stage of the Late Jurassic, with the ellimmichthyiform genera Aijaichthys and Ancashichthys.

== Classification ==
Clupeomorpha contains the following taxa:

- Genus †Beurlenichthys de Figueiredo & Gallo, 2004
- †Order Ellimmichthyiformes Grande, 1982
  - †Family Ancashichthyidae Ordóñez, Arratia, Tejada & Chacaltana, 2026
  - †Family Armigatidae A. M. Murray & M. V. H. Wilson, 2013
  - †Family Gasteroclupeidae Signeux, 1964
  - †Family Paraclupeidae Chang & Chou, 1974 (= Ellimmichthyidae Grande, 1982)
  - †Family Sorbinichthyidae Bannikov & Bacchia, 2000
- Order Clupeiformes Goodrich, 1909
  - Suborder Denticipitoidei Grande, 1982
    - Family Denticipitidae Clausen, 1959 (denticle herrings)
    - Family †Cynoclupeidae Malabarba & Di Dario, 2017
  - Suborder Clupeoidei Bleeker, 1849
    - Family †Garganoclupeidae Taverne, 2014
    - Family Spratelloididae D. S. Jordan 1925 (dwarf herrings or small round herrings)
    - Family Dussumieriidae Gill, 1861 (round herrings or rainbow sardines)
    - Family Chirocentridae Bleeker, 1849 (wolf herrings
    - Family Engraulidae Gill, 1861 (anchovies)
    - Family Pristigasteridae Bleeker, 1872 (longfin herrings)
    - Family Clupeidae Cuvier, 1816 (herrings and sprats)
    - Family Hyperlophidae Ogilby, 1897 (double-armored freshwater herrings)
    - Family Ehiravidae Deraniyagala, 1929 (river sprats)
    - Family Alosidae Svetovidov, 1952 (shads and sardines)
    - Family Dorosomatidae Gill, 1861 (thread herrings or gizzard shads and sardinellas)
