= Haimirichiidae =

Haimirichiidae Temporal range: Cenomanian to Turonian
- Articulated partial skeleton of haimirichia from the Akrabou Formation in Morocco

Scientific classification
- Domain: Eukaryota
- Kingdom: Animalia
- Phylum: Chordata
- Class: Chondrichthyes
- Subclass: Elasmobranchii
- Division: Selachii
- Order: Lamniformes
- Family: †Haimirichiidae; Vullo, Guinot, & Barbe, 2016

Genera
- Haimirichia; Roulletia

Prehistoric shark genus

Haimirichiidae is an extinct family of lamniform sharks containing two genera Haimirichia and Roulletia.
