= Ornategulum =

Ornategulum Temporal range: Cenomanian

Scientific classification
- Domain: Eukaryota
- Kingdom: Animalia
- Phylum: Chordata
- Class: Actinopterygii
- Order: Clupeiformes
- Genus: †Ornategulum; Forey, 1973

Extinct genus of fishes

Ornategulum is an extinct genus of prehistoric bony fish that lived during the Cenomanian.
