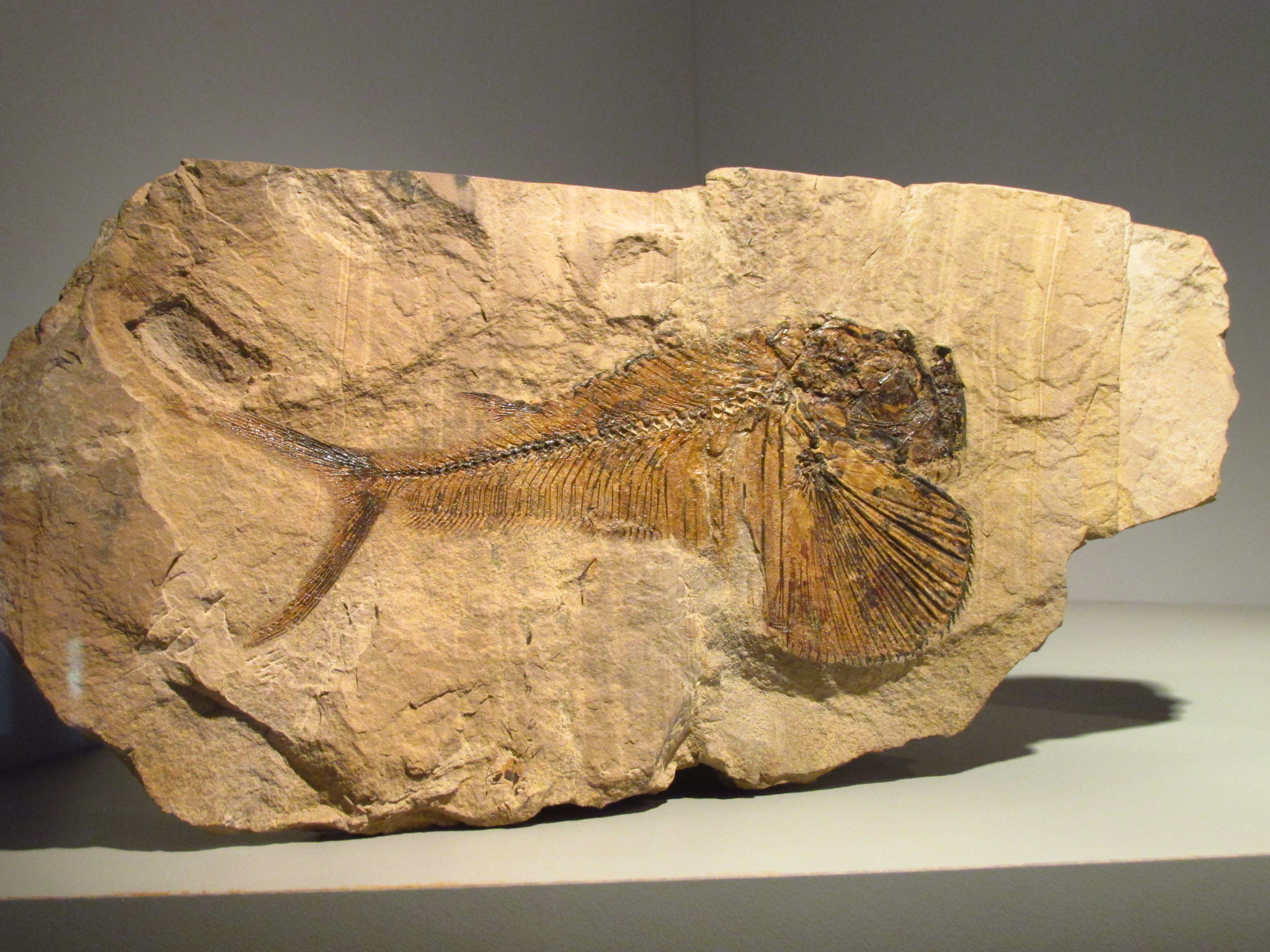
- Fossil specimen

Scientific classification
- Kingdom: Animalia
- Phylum: Chordata
- Class: Actinopterygii
- Order: †Ellimmichthyiformes
- Suborder: †Sorbinichthyoidei
- Family: †Gasteroclupeidae; Signeux, 1964
- Genus: †Gasteroclupea; Signeux, 1964
- Species: †G. branisai

Binomial name
- †Gasteroclupea branisai Signeux, 1964

= Gasteroclupea =

Gasteroclupea Temporal range: Campanian–Danian

Extinct genus of fishes

Gasteroclupea is a genus of prehistoric ellimmichthyiform fish that is distantly related to modern anchovies and herrings. It contains one species, G. branisai. It inhabited freshwater or estuarine habitats across South America during the Campanian and Maastrichtian stages of the Late Cretaceous period, and it briefly survived beyond the K-Pg boundary into the Danian stage of the Paleocene, making it among the few genera from its order to survive into the Cenozoic. Fossils of the genus have been found in the Yacoraite Formation of Argentina, the Chaunaca Formation, Santa Lucía Formation, and El Molino Formation of Bolivia, and the Navay Formation in Venezuela.

Its taxonomic identity was long uncertain, often being placed as a clupeid or an indeterminate clupeomorph, but more recent studies have placed it with the Ellimmichthyiformes. Its closest relative has been found to be Sorbinichthys, another unusual ellimmichthyiform from marine deposits in Lebanon, though some studies have been inconclusive about this.

It is notable for its extremely deep abdominal profile (hence the genus name Gasteroclupea, translating to "stomach herring"), which shows heavy convergent evolution with the distantly related herring Pristigaster and especially with the unrelated freshwater hatchetfish (Gasterpelecidae), both of which are also known from South America. As with modern freshwater hatchetfish, its upturned mouth may have been an adaptation to a lifestyle of feeding on fallen insects on the water's surface.
