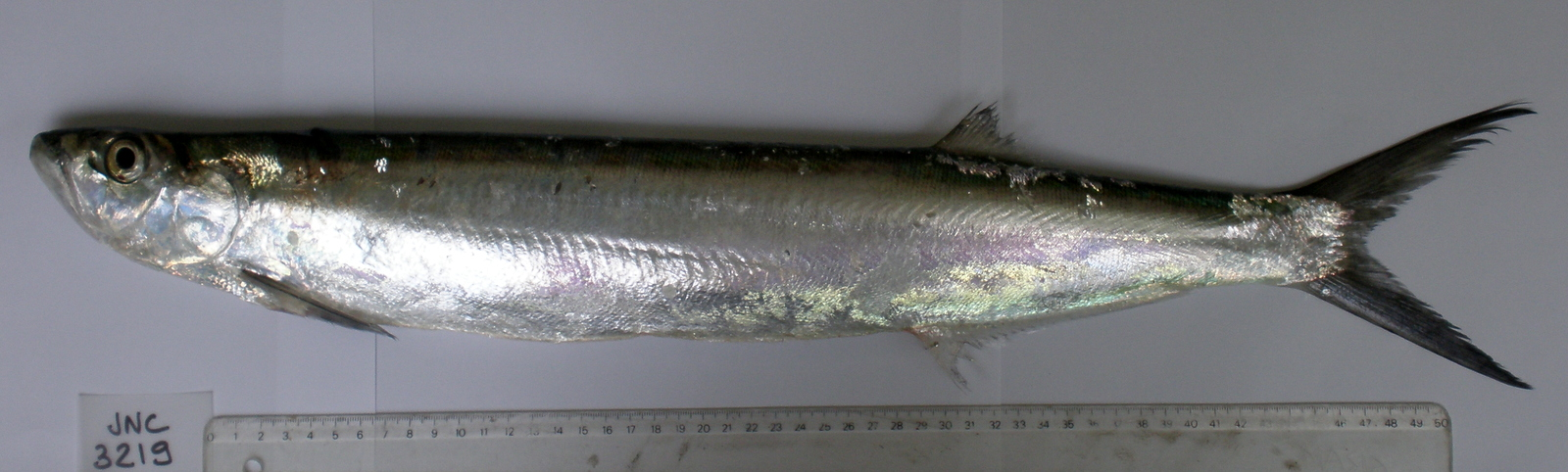
- Dorab wolf-herring

Scientific classification
- Kingdom: Animalia
- Phylum: Chordata
- Class: Actinopterygii
- Order: Clupeiformes
- Family: Chirocentridae; Bleeker, 1849
- Genus: Chirocentrus; Cuvier, 1816

Type species
- Clupea dorab Fabricius, 1775

Species
- See text

Synonyms
- Neosudis Castelnau, 1873

= Wolf herring =

Wolf herring Temporal range: 55–0 Ma

Genus of fishes

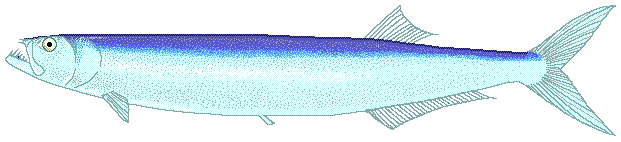
Drawing of C. dorab

Wolf herring are a family (Chirocentridae) of two marine species of ray-finned fish related to herrings.

Both species have elongated bodies and jaws with long sharp teeth that aid their ravenous appetites, primarily for other fish. They can grow up to 1 m in length and have silvery sides with bluish backs.

They are commercially fished and sold fresh or frozen.

Wolf herring tend to stay near coastal waters off Africa and Asia, mostly in the Indian Ocean, but some have also been spotted near Australian beaches.

== Species ==
- Chirocentrus dorab (Fabricius, 1775) - Dorab wolf-herring, found in warm coastal waters from the Red Sea to Japan and Australia
- Chirocentrus nudus Swainson, 1839 - whitefin wolf-herring, found in a similar range (This species is difficult to distinguish from C. dorab; the former has a black mark on its dorsal fin. This species is also known to eat crabs in addition to its usual diet of smaller fish.)
