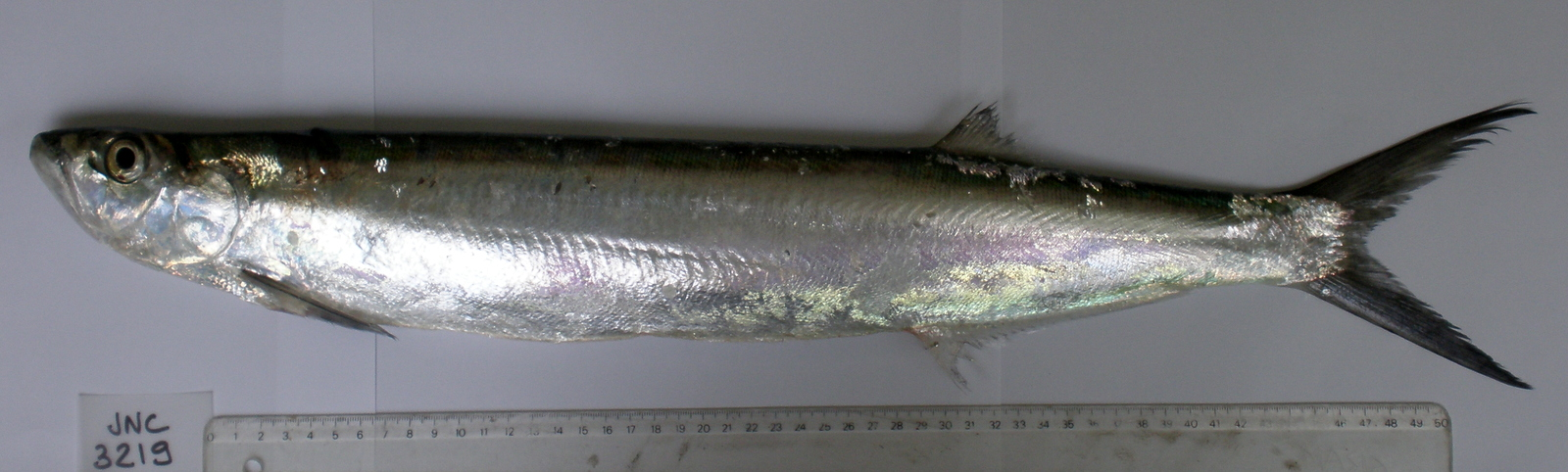

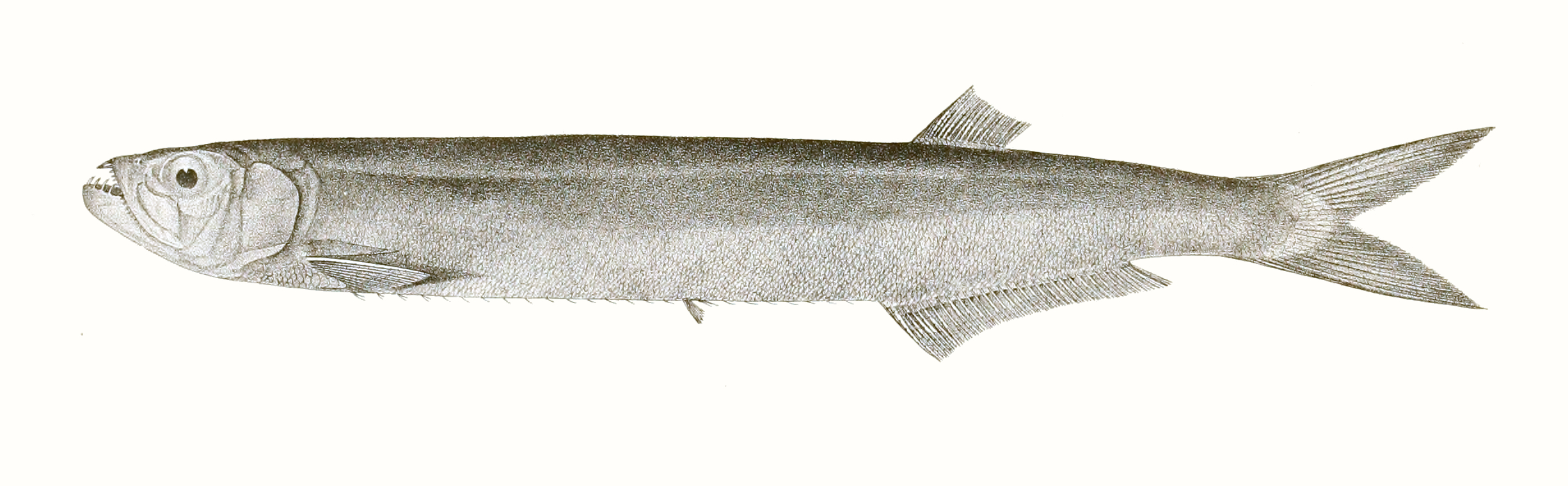

Conservation status
- Least Concern (IUCN 3.1)

Scientific classification
- Kingdom: Animalia
- Phylum: Chordata
- Class: Actinopterygii
- Order: Clupeiformes
- Family: Chirocentridae
- Genus: Chirocentrus
- Species: C. dorab

Binomial name
- Chirocentrus dorab (Forsskål, 1775)

Synonyms
- Chirocentris dorab (Forsskål, 1775); Chirocentrus hypselosoma Bleeker, 1852; Clupea dentex Bloch & Schneider, 1801; Clupea dorab Forsskål, 1775; Esox chirocentrus Lacepède, 1803; Neosudis vorax Castelnau, 1873

= Dorab wolf-herring =

Species of ray-finned fish

The dorab wolf-herring (Chirocentrus dorab) is a fish species from the genus Chirocentrus of the family Chirocentridae. It is a coastal fish, silvery below and bright blue above. It is found in both marine and brackish or estuarine waters, where it primarily feeds on smaller fish and possibly crustaceans. The genus name Chirocentrus is from the Greek cheir meaning hand and kentron meaning sting. Dorab is from the Arabic language word darrab (ضرّاب), probably a corrupted form of durubb (دُرُبّ), a name for goldfish in Arabic. It has another Arabic name, lisan (لسان), which means tongue. In Sinhala, it is known as කටුවල්ලා (katuwalla).

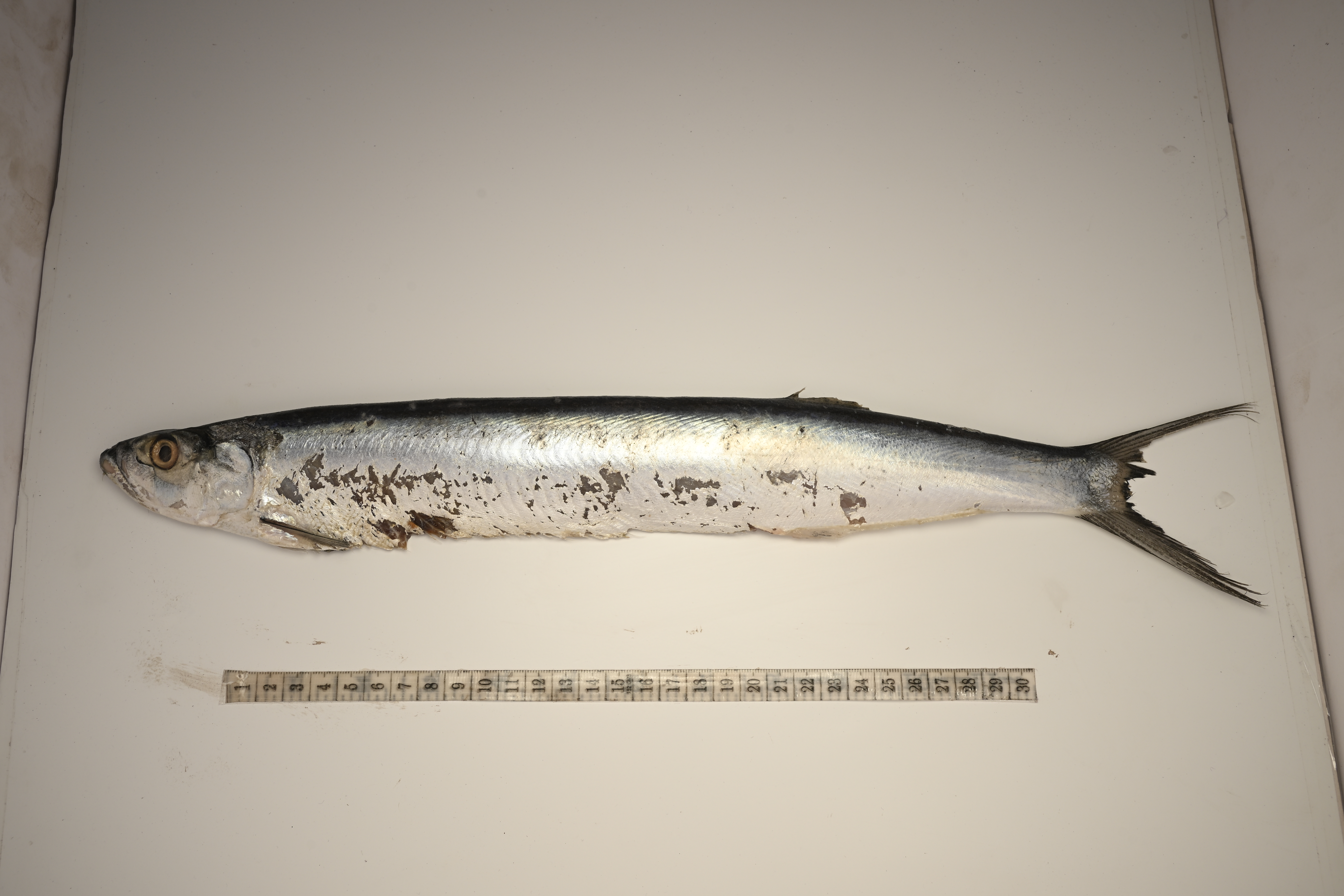
Chirocentrus dorab

== Description ==
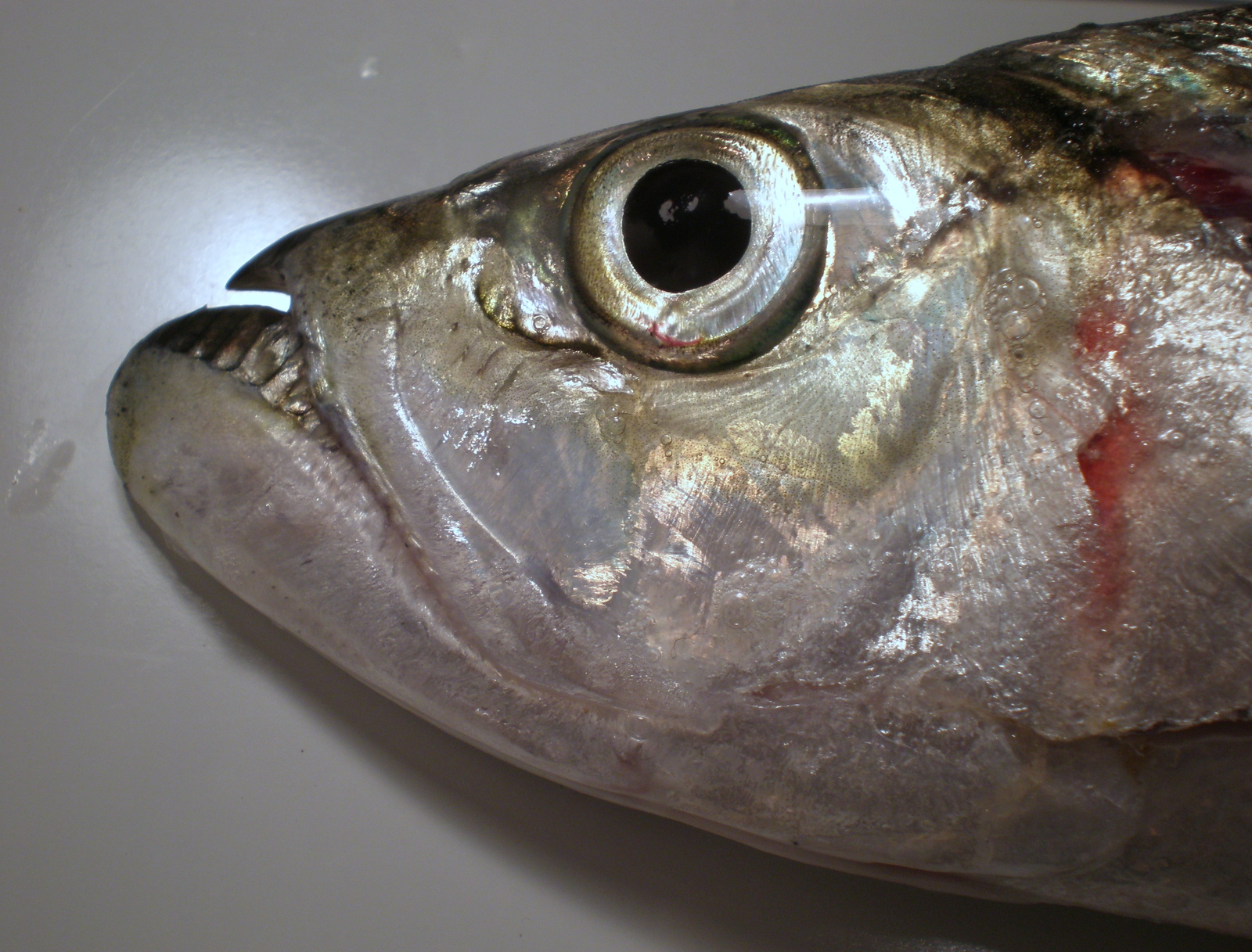
Dorab wolf-herring head

The dorab wolf-herring have slender, elongated bodies. They are commonly about 3–120 centimetres (1.2–47.2 in) in length and weigh between 170–1,200 grams (0.37–2.65 lb).

== Range ==
The dorab wolf-herring is found in the Indo-Pacific, probably throughout the warmer coastal waters, from the Red Sea and East Africa to the Solomon Islands, north to southern Japan, south to northern Australia. It was recently reported in Tonga.

== Fisheries ==
The dorab wolf-herring is a commercial species which is sold fresh, dried, salted or frozen. It is also a game fish.
