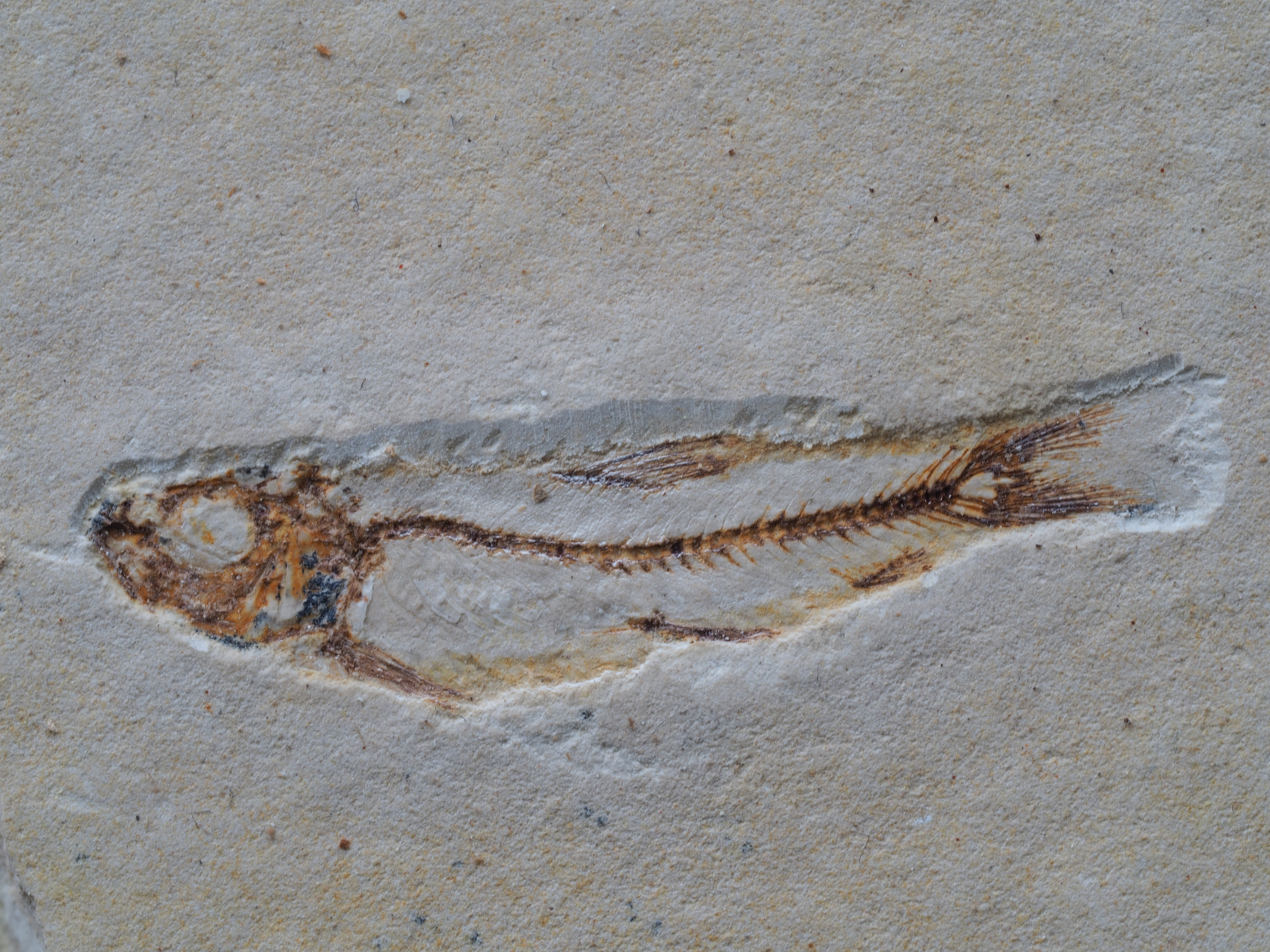

Scientific classification
- Kingdom: Animalia
- Phylum: Chordata
- Class: Actinopterygii
- Genus: †Lusitanichthys; Gavet, 1980

= Lusitanichthys =

Lusitanichthys Temporal range: Cenomanian

Lusitanichthys is an extinct genus of prehistoric bony fish that lived during the Cenomanian.

== See also ==
- Prehistoric fish
- List of prehistoric bony fish
