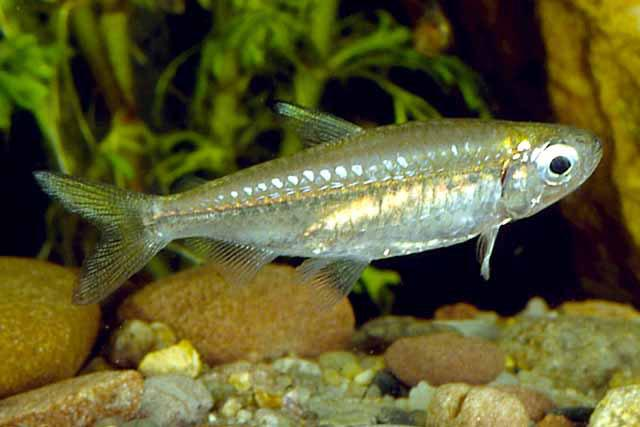

Conservation status
- Vulnerable (IUCN 3.1)

Scientific classification
- Kingdom: Animalia
- Phylum: Chordata
- Class: Actinopterygii
- Order: Clupeiformes
- Suborder: Denticipitoidei; Grande, 1982
- Family: Denticipitidae; Clausen, 1959
- Genus: Denticeps; Clausen, 1959
- Species: D. clupeoides

Binomial name
- Denticeps clupeoides Clausen, 1959

= Denticle herring =

Denticle herring Temporal range: Middle Eocene to present

Species of fish

The denticle herring (Denticeps clupeoides) is a small, up to 15 cm (5.9 in) long, species of ray-finned fish found only in the rivers of Benin, Nigeria, and western Cameroon. It is related to the herrings, but notable for its large anal fin and its array of denticle-like scales under the head, which give it almost a furry appearance.

It is the sole living member of the family Denticipitidae, and is the last surviving member of a very ancient lineage of clupeiforms, the Denticipitoidei, that diverged from the clupeoids during the Mesozoic. Studies have estimated the divergence of Denticipitidae from the clupeoids to have occurred anywhere between the Late Jurassic to Early Cretaceous, and that it must have occurred before the Barremian stage, when the earliest clupeoids are known. The only other known member of this lineage is Paleodenticeps, a fossil denticipitid known from the Mahenge Formation of Tanzania during the middle Eocene. Denticeps thus likely descend from a marine clupeiform that colonized the freshwater ecosystems of Africa anywhere between the Early Cretaceous to the mid-Eocene.

== See also ==
- List of fish families
