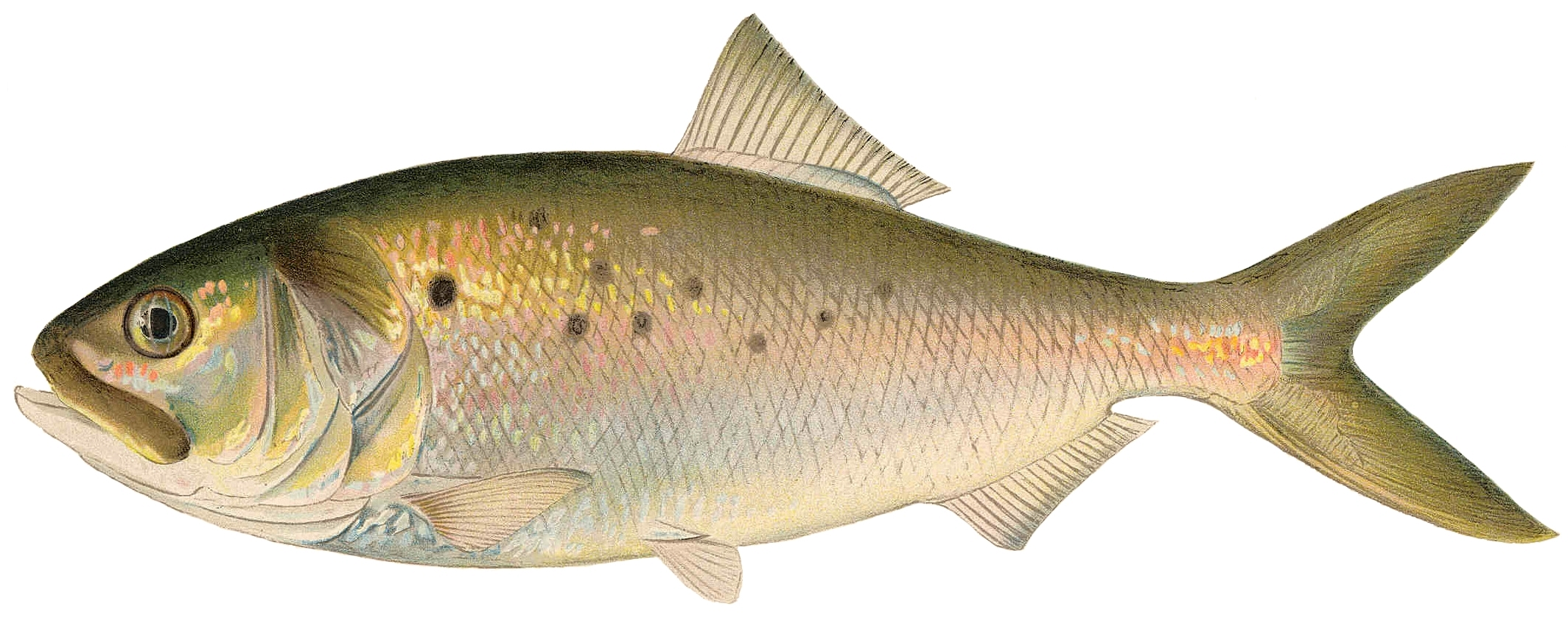
- Atlantic menhaden (Brevoortia tyrannus)

Scientific classification
- Kingdom: Animalia
- Phylum: Chordata
- Class: Actinopterygii
- Clade: Clupeocephala
- Cohort: Otocephala; Johnson & Patterson, 1996

Subcohorts
- Alepocephali; Clupei; Ostariophysi

Synonyms
- Ostarioclupeomorpha; Otomorpha

= Otocephala =

Otocephala Temporal range: Late Jurassic (Tithonian) to present

Clade of ray-finned fishes

Otocephala is a clade of ray-finned fishes within the infraclass Teleostei which evolved some 230 million years ago. It is named for the presence of a hearing (otophysic) link from the swimbladder to the inner ear. Other names proposed for the group include Ostarioclupeomorpha and Otomorpha.

The clade contains Clupeiformes (herrings) and Ostariophysi, a group of other orders including Cypriniformes (minnows and allies), Gymnotiformes (knifefish), and Siluriformes (catfish). Otocephala may also contain Alepocephaliformes (slickheads), but as yet (2016) without morphological evidence.

The clade is sister to Euteleostei which contains the majority of bony fish alive today.

In 2015, Benton and colleagues set a "plausible minimum" date for the origin of crown Otocephala as about 228.4 million years ago. They argued that since the oldest locality for any diversity of stem teleosts is the Carnian of Polberg bei Lunz, Austria, whose base is 235 million years old, a rough estimate for Otocephala can be made. The earliest known fossil members of the group date to the Tithonian stage of the Late Jurassic, and include the stem-ostariophysan Tischlingerichthys from Germany and the concurrent clupeomorphs Aijaichthys & Ancashichthys from Peru.

== Taxonomy ==
The 5th edition of Fishes of the World classifies the Otocephala as a cohort and subdivides it above the level of order as set out below, the classification of extant taxa from the level of order and below follows Eschmeyer's Catalog of Fishes:

- Cohort Otocephala
  - Superorder Clupeomorpha Greenwood et al. 1966
    - †Order Ellimmichthyiformes Grande, 1982
    - Order Clupeiformes Goodrich, 1909
  - Superorder Alepocephali Betancur-R, et al., 2017
    - Order Alepocephaliformes N. B. Marshall, 1962
  - Superorder Ostariophysi M. Sagemehl, 1885
    - Series Anotophysi Rosen and Greenwood, 1970
      - Order Gonorynchiformes Greenwood, Rosen, Weitzman, and Myers, 1966
    - Series Otophysi Garstang, 1931
      - Order Cypriniformes Goodrich, 1909
      - Order Gymnotiformes Regan, 1912
      - Order Characiformes Regan, 1911
      - Order Siluriformes Hay, 1929

Taxonomy based on:

- Cohort Otocephala Johnson & Patterson 1996 [Otomorpha Wiley & Johnson 2010; Ostarioclupeomorpha Arratia 1997]
  - Genus †Kermichthys Taverne 1993
  - Family †Lycoclupeidae Gowda 1968
  - Family †Clupavidae Bertin & Arambourg 1958
  - Subcohort Clupei Wiley & Johnson 2010 [Clupeomorpha Greenwood et al. 1966]
    - Order †Ellimmichthyiformes Grande 1982
    - Order Clupeiformes Goodrich 1859
  - Subcohort Alepocephali
    - Order Alepocephaliformes Marshall 1962
  - Subcohort Ostariophysi Sagemehl 1885
    - Genus †Tischlingerichthys Arratia 1997
    - Family †Ancylostylidae Jordan 1923
    - Family †Erythrinolepididae Cockerell 1919 corrig.
    - Section Anotophysa (Rosen & Greenwood 1970) Sagemehl 1885 [Anotophysi Rosen & Greenwood 1970]
      - Order †Sorbininardiformes Taverne 1999
      - Order Gonorynchiformes Regan 1909
    - Section Otophysa (Rosen & Greenwood 1970) Sagemehl 1885 [Otophysi Rosen & Greenwood 1970]
      - Genus †Nardonoides Mayrinck, Brito & Otero, 2014
      - Family †Acronichthyidae Liu et al., 2025
      - Family †Chanoididae Taverne 2005
      - Family †Salminopsidae Gayet 1985
      - Superorder Cypriniphysae [Cypriniphysi Woodward 1901]
        - Order Cypriniformes Bleeker 1859 sensu Goodrich 1909
      - Superorder Characiphysae (Fink & Fink 1981)
        - Order Characiformes Goodrich 1909
      - Superorder Siluriphysae [Siluriphysi]
        - Order Gymnotiformes Berg 1940 (Neotropical knifefishes)
        - Order Siluriformes Cuvier 1817 sensu Hay 1929 (catfishes)

== Phylogeny ==
Phylogeny of living groups based on:

- Otocephala
  - Clupei
    Clupeiformes (herrings and relatives)
  - - Alepocephali
      Alepocephaliformes (slickheads and tubeshoulders)
    - Ostariophysi
      - Anotophysa
        Gonorynchiformes (milkfish and relatives)
      - Otophysa
        - Cypriniphysae
          Cypriniformes (minnow, carp, loach)
        - - Characiphysae
            Characiformes (tetras and piranhas)
          - Siluriphysae
            - Gymnotiformes (knifefish)
            - Siluriformes (catfish)
