= Clupeiformes =

Clupeiformes Temporal range: Barremian–present
- Atlantic herring, Clupea harengus

Scientific classification
- Kingdom: Animalia
- Phylum: Chordata
- Class: Actinopterygii
- Division: Teleostei
- Cohort: Otocephala
- Superorder: Clupeomorpha
- Order: Clupeiformes; Goodrich, 1909

Type species
- Clupea harengus Linnaeus, 1758

Families
- See text

Order of fishes

Clupeiformes /ˈkluːpiːɪfɔːrmiːz/ is the order of ray-finned fish that includes the herring family, Clupeidae, and the anchovy family, Engraulidae and sardines. The group includes many of the most important forage and food fish.

Clupeiformes are physostomes, which means that their gas bladder has a pneumatic duct connecting it to the gut. They typically lack a lateral line, but still have the eyes, fins and scales that are common to most fish, though not all fish have these attributes. They are generally silvery fish with streamlined, spindle-shaped bodies, and they often school. Most species eat plankton which they filter from the water with their gill rakers.

The former order of Isospondyli was subsumed mostly by Clupeiformes, but some isospondylous fishes (isospondyls) were assigned to Osteoglossiformes, Salmoniformes, Cetomimiformes, etc.

Their sister group were the extinct Ellimmichthyiformes, which were dominant throughout much of the Cretaceous and into the Paleogene, and often coexisted with clupeiforms at many known localities. Both groups closely resembled each other morphologically, although the ellimmichthyiformes evolved some highly divergent body plans later in the Cretaceous.

Several fossil clupeiforms are known from the Early Cretaceous of South America that appear to be more closely allied with Clupeioidei over the Denticipitidae. This suggests a very deep divergence within the crown group Clupeiformes that must have occurred during the Early Cretaceous or before.

== Families ==
Phylogeny of Clupeiformes by Lavoué et al 2014.

- Clupeiformes
  - Denticipitoidei
    Denticipitidae
  - Clupeoidei
    - - Engraulidae
        - Coiliinae
        - Engraulinae
      - - Spratelloidinae
        - - Pristigasteridae
          - - - Dussumieriidae s.s.
              - Chirocentridae
            - Clupeidae
              - Clupeinae
              - Dorosomatinae

The order includes about 405 species in ten families:

- Order Clupeiformes
  - Genus †Histiothrissa Woodward, 1901
  - Genus ?†Jhingrania Misra & Saxena, 1959 (possibly a clupavid)
  - Genus †Spratticeps Patterson, 1970
  - Suborder Denticipitoidei Grande, 1982
    - Family Denticipitidae Clausen, 1959 (denticle herring)
    - Family †Cynoclupeidae Malabarba & Di Dario, 2017
  - Suborder Clupeoidei Bleeker, 1849
    - Genus †Beksinskiella Granica, Bieńowska-Wasiluki & Paldyna, 2024
    - Genus †Italoclupea Taverne, 2007
    - Genus †Leufuichthys Gallo et al., 2011
    - Genus †Nardoclupea Taverne, 2002
    - Genus †Nolfia de Figueiredo, 2009
    - Genus †Pseudoellima de Figueiredo, 2009
    - Genus †Scombroclupea Kner, 1863
    - Family †Garganoclupeidae Taverne, 2014
    - Family Spratelloididae D. S. Jordan 1925 (dwarf herrings or small round herrings)
    - Family Dussumieriidae Gill, 1861 (round herrings or rainbow sardines)
    - Family Chirocentridae Bleeker, 1849 (wolf herrings)
    - Superfamily Engrauloidea
      - Family Engraulidae Gill, 1861 (anchovies)
        - Subfamily Coiliinae Bleeker, 1872 (Old World anchovies)
        - Subfamily Engraulinae Gill, 1861 (anchovies)
      - Family †Clupeopsidae Marramà & Carnevale, 2026
    - Family Pristigasteridae Bleeker, 1872 (longfin herrings)
    - Family Clupeidae Cuvier, 1816 (herrings and sprats)
    - Family Hyperlophidae Ogilby, 1897 (double-armored freshwater herrings)
    - Family Ehiravidae Deraniyagala, 1929 (river sprats)
      - Subfamily Ehiravinae Deraniyagala, 1929 (Indian freshwater herrings)
      - Subfamily Pellonulinae Svetovidov, 1952 (African freshwater herrings)
    - Family Alosidae Svetovidov, 1952 (shads and sardines)
    - Family Dorosomatidae Gill, 1861 (thread herrings or gizzard shads and sardinellas)
