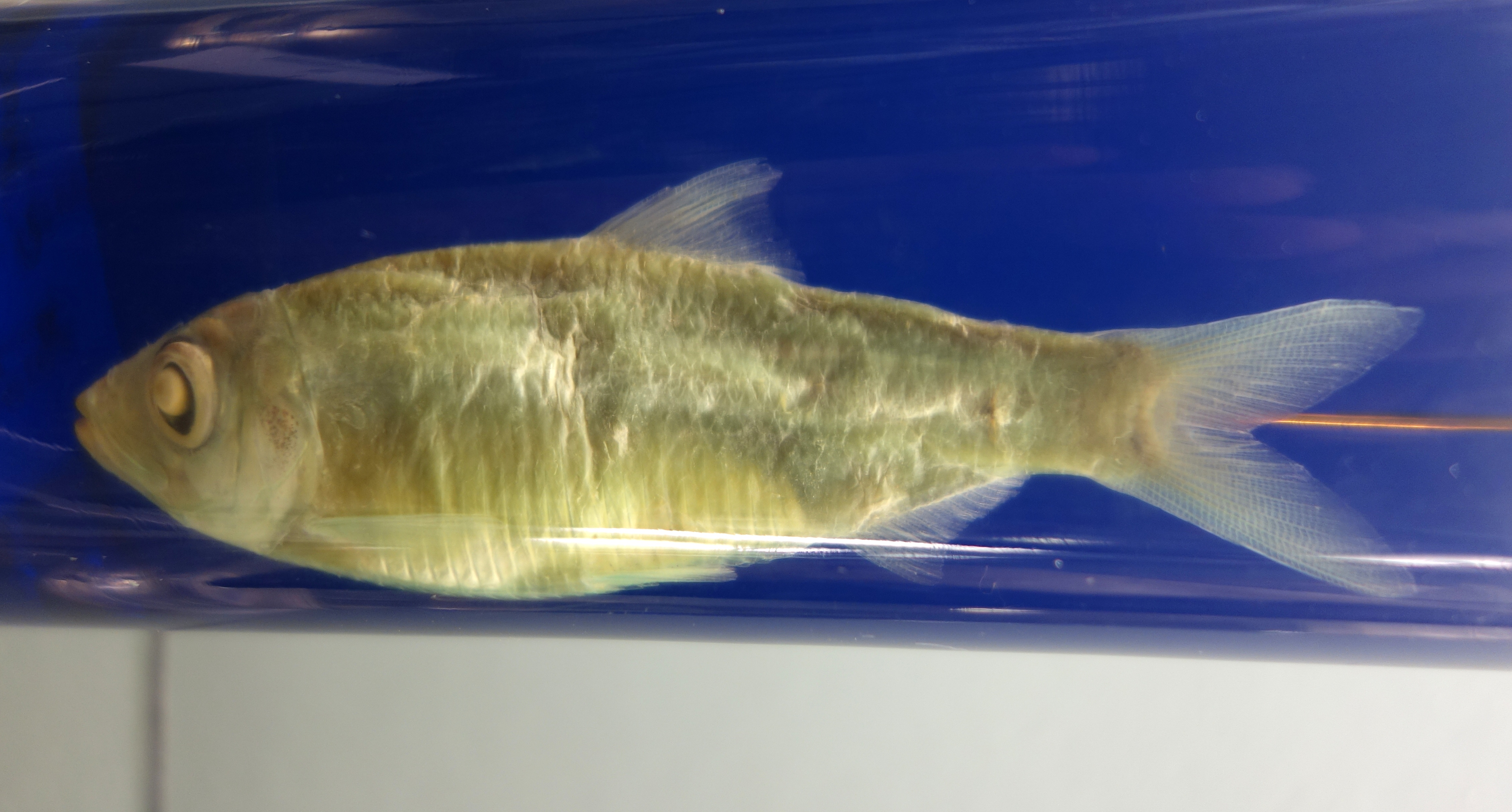
- Pellonula vorax
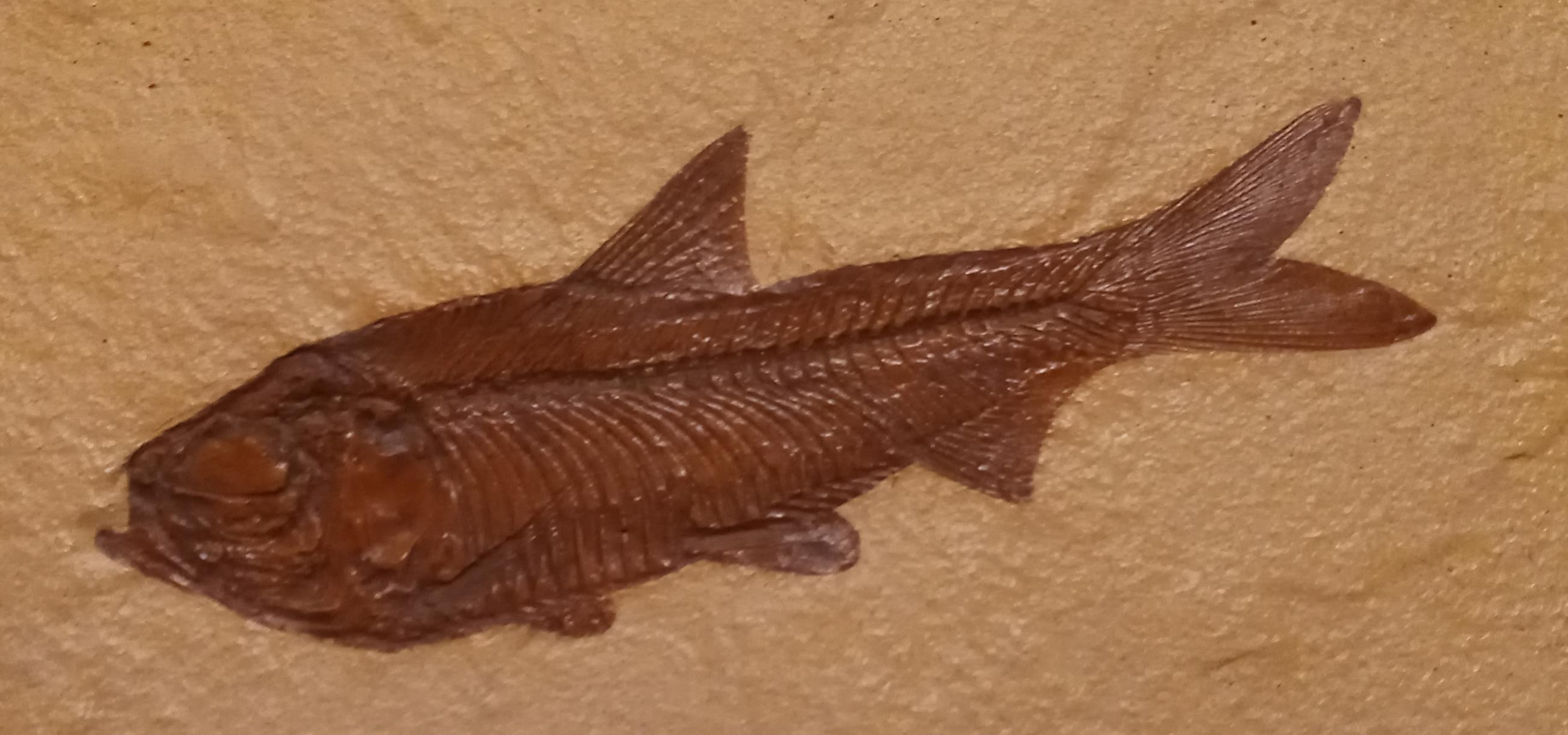
- †Knightia cf. alta

Scientific classification
- Domain: Eukaryota
- Kingdom: Animalia
- Phylum: Chordata
- Class: Actinopterygii
- Order: Clupeiformes
- Family: Clupeidae
- Subfamily: Pellonulinae

Genera
- †Knightia; Clupeichthys; Clupeoides; Congothrissa; Corica; Ehirava; Hyperlophus; Laeviscutella; Limnothrissa; Microthrissa; Minyclupeoides; Odaxothrissa; Pellonula; Poecilothrissa; Potamalosa; Potamothrissa

= Pellonulinae =

Pellonulinae Temporal range: 55–0 Ma Early Eocene to present

Subfamily of fishes

Pellonulinae is a subfamily of freshwater herrings belonging to the family Clupeidae. Extant species are found in Asia, Africa and Australia, and members of the family occurred in North America in the Eocene.
