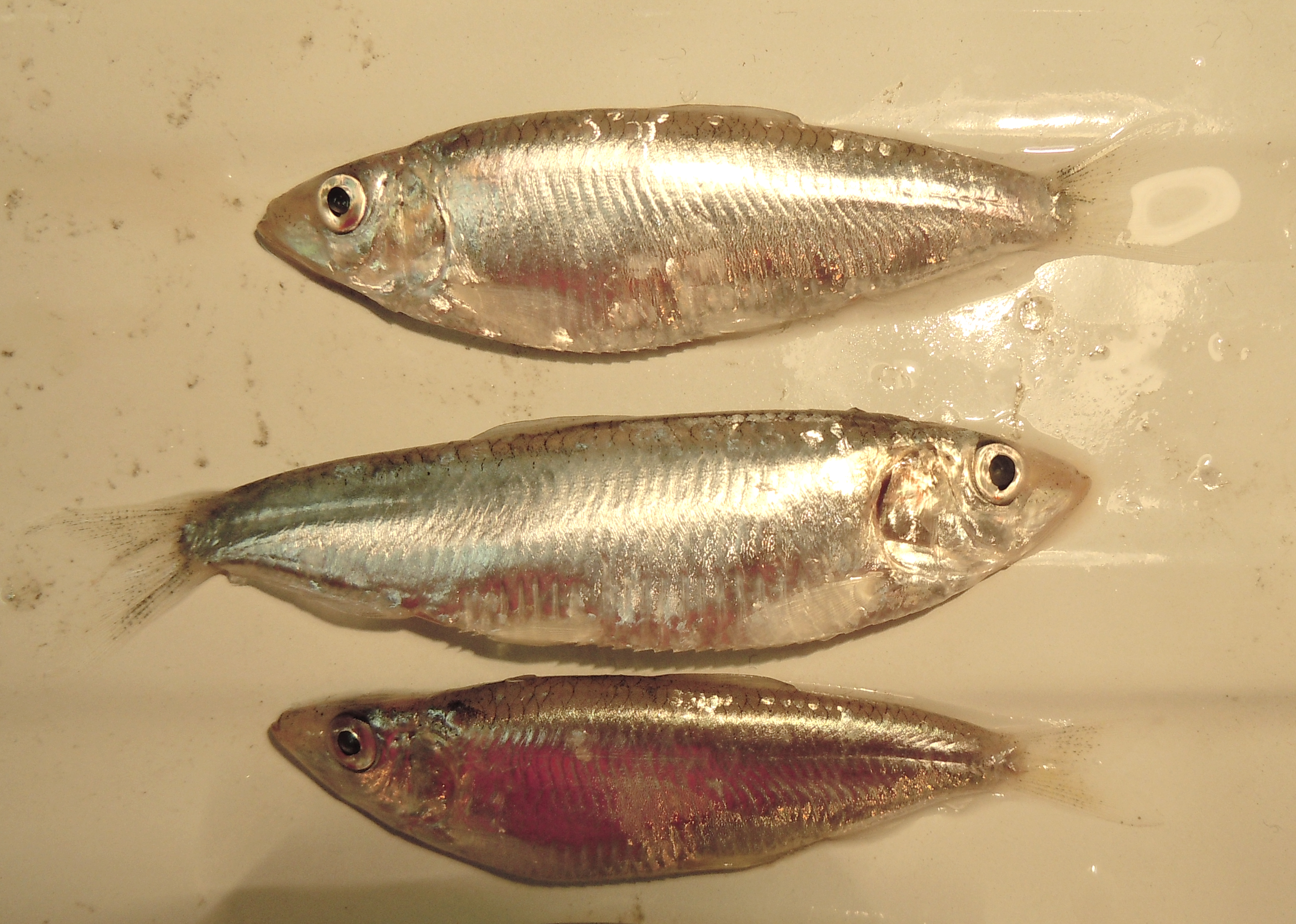
- Clupeonella cultriventris

Scientific classification
- Kingdom: Animalia
- Phylum: Chordata
- Class: Actinopterygii
- Division: Teleostei
- Order: Clupeiformes
- Suborder: Clupeoidei
- Family: Ehiravidae; Deraniyagala, 1929

Genera
- see text

= Ehiravidae =

Family of fishes

Ehiravidae is a family of clupeiform fishes. It is now recognized by FishBase as a family in its own right; it had been considered to be a subfamily of Clupeidae. It contains 22 extant genera.

== Genera ==
Ehiravidae contains the following genera:

Subfamily Ehiravinae Deraniyagala, 1929 (Indian freshwater herrings)

- Clupeichthys Bleeker, 1855
- Clupeoides Bleeker, 1851
- Clupeonella Kessler, 1877
- Corica Hamilton, 1822
- Dayella Talwar & Whitehead, 1971
- Ehirava Deraniyagala, 1929
- Gilchristella Fowler, 1935
- Minyclupeoides Roberts, 2008
- Sauvagella Bertin, 1940
- Spratellomorpha Bertin, 1946
- Sundasalanx Roberts, 1981

Subfamily Pellonulinae Svetovidov, 1952 (African freshwater herrings)

- Congothrissa Poll, 1964
- Laeviscutella Poll, Whitehead & Hopson, 1965
- Limnothrissa Regan, 1917
- Microthrissa Boulenger, 1902
- Nannothrissa Poll, 1965
- Odaxothrissa Boulenger, 1899
- Pellonula Günther, 1868
- Poecilothrissa Regan, 1917
- Potamothrissa Regan, 1917
- Sierrathrissa Thys van den Audenaerde, 1969
- Stolothrissa Regan, 1917
- Thrattidion T. R. Roberts, 1972
