= Herring =

Forage fish, mostly belonging to the family Clupeidae

External videos
- Humpback Whale: Hunting Technique – YouTube
- Bait Ball Feast – Nature's Great Events

Herring

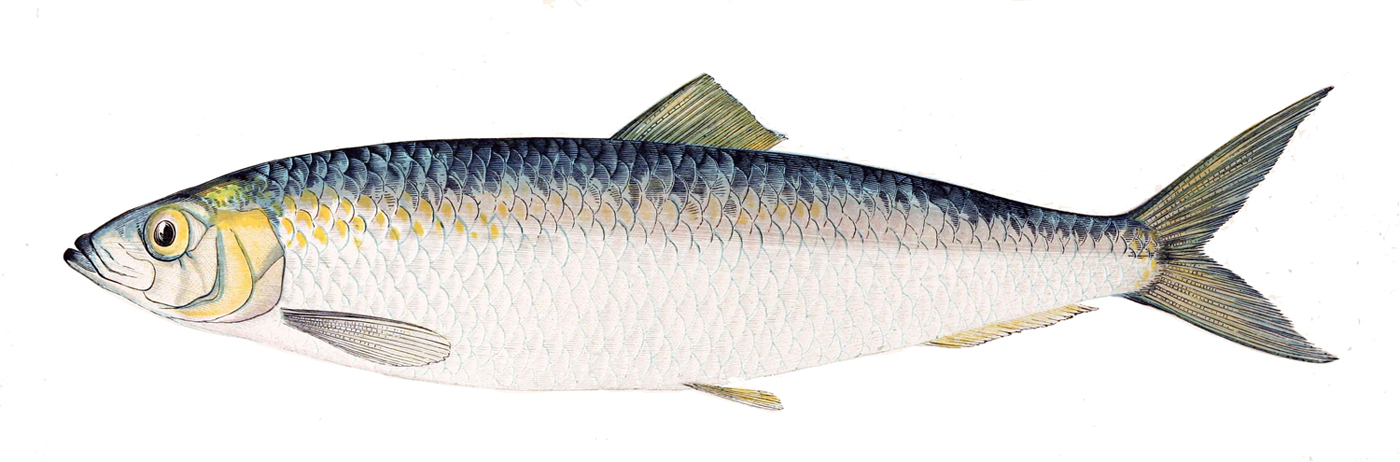
Atlantic herring, Clupea harengus

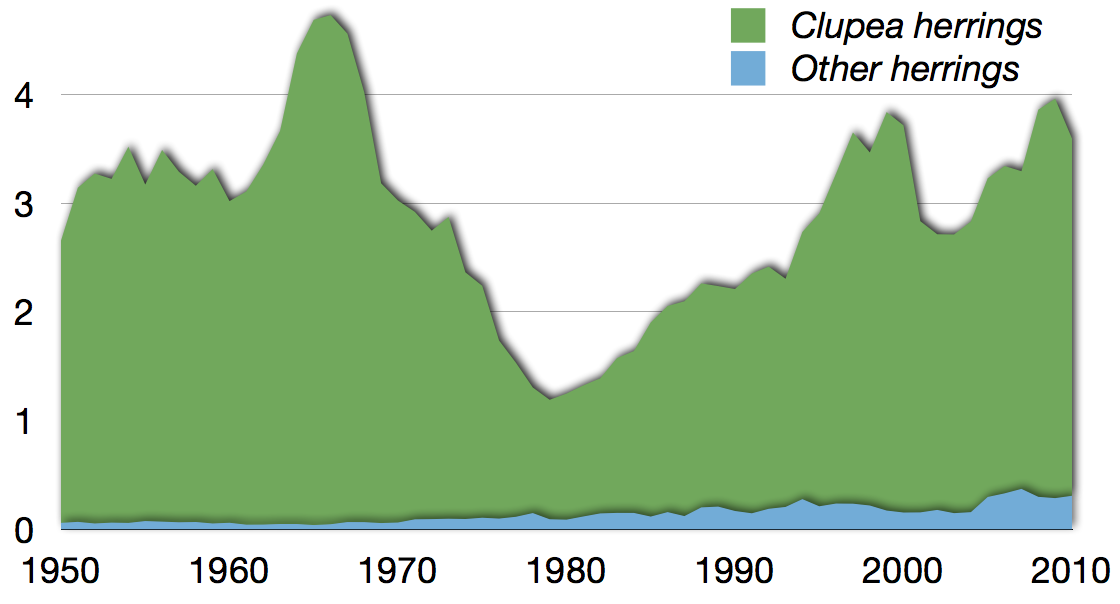
Global commercial capture of herrings
in million tonnes reported by the FAO 1950–2010

Herring are various species of forage fish, belonging to the order Clupeiformes.

Herring often move in large schools around fishing banks and near the coast, found particularly in shallow, temperate waters of the North Pacific and North Atlantic Oceans, including the Baltic Sea, as well as off the west coast of South America. Three species of Clupea (the type genus of the herring family Clupeidae) are recognised, and comprise about 90% of all herrings captured in fisheries. The most abundant of these species is the Atlantic herring, which comprises over half of all herring capture. Fish called herring are also found in the Arabian Sea, Indian Ocean, and Bay of Bengal.

Herring played an important role in the history of marine fisheries in Europe, and early in the 20th century, their study was fundamental to the development of fisheries science. These oily fish also have a long history as an important food fish, and are often salted, smoked, or pickled.

Herring were also known as "silver darlings" in the United Kingdom.

== Species ==
A number of different species, most belonging to the family Clupeidae, are commonly referred to as herrings. The origins of the term "herring" is somewhat unclear, though it may derive from the same source as the Old High German heri meaning a "host, multitude", in reference to the large schools they form.

The type genus of the herring family Clupeidae is Clupea. Clupea contains only two species: the Atlantic herring (the type species) found in the North Atlantic, and the Pacific herring mainly found in the North Pacific. Subspecific divisions have been suggested for both the Atlantic and Pacific herrings, but their biological basis remains unclear.

Herrings in the genus Clupea
Common name	Scientific name	Maximum length	Common length	Maximum weight	Maximum age	Trophic level	Fish Base	FAO	ITIS	IUCN status
Atlantic herring	Clupea harengus Linnaeus, 1758	45.0 cm	30.0 cm	1.05 kg	22 years	3.23				Least concern
Pacific herring	Clupea pallasii Valenciennes, 1847	46.0 cm	25.0 cm		19 years	3.15				Data deficient

In addition, a number of related species, all in the Clupeidae, are commonly referred to as herrings. The table immediately below includes those members of the family Clupeidae referred to by FishBase as herrings which have been assessed by the International Union for Conservation of Nature.

Other herrings in the family Clupeidae
Group	Common name	Scientific name	Maximum length	Common length	Maximum weight	Maximum age	Trophic level	Fish Base	FAO	ITIS	IUCN status
Freshwater herrings	Toothed river herring	Clupeoides papuensis (Ramsay & Ogilby, 1886)	cm	cm	kg	years					Data deficient
Round herrings	Day's round herring	Dayella malabarica (Day, 1873)	cm	cm	kg	years					Least concern
Round herrings	Dwarf round herring	Jenkinsia lamprotaenia (Gosse, 1851)	cm	cm	kg	years					Least concern
Round herrings	Gilchrist's round herring	Gilchristella aestuaria (Gilchrist, 1913)	cm	cm	kg	years					Least concern
Round herrings	Little-eye round herring	Jenkinsia majua Whitehead, 1963	cm	cm	kg	years					Least concern
Round herrings	Red-eye round herring	Etrumeus sadina (Mitchill, 1814)	33 cm	25 cm	kg	years					Least concern
Round herrings	Two-finned round herring	Spratellomorpha bianalis (Bertin, 1940)	4.5 cm	cm	kg	years	3.11				Data deficient
Round herrings	Whitehead's round herring	Etrumeus whiteheadi (Wongratana, 1983)	20 cm	cm	kg	years	3.4				Least concern
Round herrings	Venezuelan herring	Jenkinsia parvula Cervigón and Velasquez, 1978	cm	cm	kg	years					Vulnerable
Thread herrings	Galapagos thread herring	Opisthonema berlangai (Günther, 1867)	26 cm	18 cm	kg	years	3.27				Vulnerable
Thread herrings	Middling thread herring	Opisthonema medirastre Berry & Barrett, 1963	cm	cm	kg	years					Least concern
Thread herrings	Pacific thread herring	Opisthonema libertate (Günther, 1867)	30 cm	22 cm	kg	years					Least concern
Thread herrings	Slender thread herring	Opisthonema bulleri (Regan, 1904)	cm	cm	kg	years					Least concern
Other	Araucanian herring	Strangomera bentincki (Norman, 1936)	28.4 cm	cm	kg	years	2.69				Least concern
Other	Blackstripe herring	Lile nigrofasciata Castro-Aguirre Ruiz-Campos and Balart, 2002	cm	cm	kg	years					Least concern
Other	Denticle herring	Denticeps clupeoides Clausen, 1959	cm	cm	kg	years					Vulnerable
Other	Dogtooth herring	Chirocentrodon bleekerianus (Poey, 1867)	cm	cm	kg	years					Least concern
Other	Graceful herring	Lile gracilis Castro-Aguirre and Vivero, 1990	cm	cm	kg	years					Least concern
Other	Pacific Flatiron herring	Harengula thrissina (Jordan and Gilbert, 1882)	cm	cm	kg	years					Least concern
Other	Sanaga pygmy herring	Thrattidion noctivagus Roberts, 1972	cm	cm	kg	years					Least concern
Other	Silver-stripe round herring	Spratelloides gracilis (Temminck & Schlegel, 1846)	10.5 cm	cm	kg	years	3.0				Least concern
Other	Striped herring	Lile stolifera (Jordan & Gilbert, 1882)	cm	cm	kg	years					Least concern
Other	West African pygmy herring	Sierrathrissa leonensis Thys van den Audenaerde, 1969	cm	cm	kg	years					Least concern

Also, a number of other species are called herrings, which may be related to clupeids or just share some characteristics of herrings (such as the lake herring, which is a salmonid). Just which of these species are called herrings can vary with locality, so what might be called a herring in one locality might be called something else in another locality. Some examples:

Other fishes called herring
	Common name	Scientific name	Maximum length	Common length	Maximum weight	Maximum age	Trophic level	Fish Base	FAO	ITIS	IUCN status
Longfin herring	Bigeyed longfin herring	Opisthopterus macrops (Günther, 1867)	cm	cm	kg	years					Least concern
Longfin herring	Dove's longfin herring	Opisthopterus dovii (Günther 1868)	cm	cm	kg	years					Least concern
Longfin herring	Hatchet herring	Ilisha fuerthii (Steindachner, 1875)	cm	cm	kg	years					Least concern
Longfin herring	Panama longfin herring	Odontognathus panamensis (Steindachner, 1876)	cm	cm	kg	years					Least concern
Longfin herring	Tropical longfin herring	Neoopisthopterus tropicus (Hildebrand 1946)	cm	cm	kg	years					Least concern
Longfin herring	Vaqueira longfin herring	Opisthopterus effulgens (Regan 1903)	cm	cm	kg	years					Vulnerable
Longfin herring	Equatorial longfin herring	Opisthopterus equatorialis Hildebrand, 1946	cm	cm	kg	years					Least concern
Wolf herring	Dorab wolf-herring	Chirocentrus dorab (Forsskål, 1775)	100 cm	60 cm	kg	years	4.50				Least concern
Wolf herring	Whitefin wolf-herring	Chirocentrus nudus Swainson, 1839	100 cm	cm	0.41 kg	years	4.19				Least concern
Freshwater whitefish	Lake herring (cisco)	Coregonus artedi Lesueur, 1818	cm	cm	kg	years					Least concern

== Characteristics ==
The species of Clupea belong to the larger family Clupeidae (herrings, shads, sardines, menhadens), which comprises some 200 species that share similar features. These silvery-coloured fish have a single dorsal fin, which is soft, without spines. They have no lateral line and have a protruding lower jaw. Their size varies between subspecies: the Baltic herring (Clupea harengus membras) is small, 14 to 18 cm (about 5.5 to 7 inches); the proper Atlantic herring (Clupea harengus harengus) can grow to about 46 cm (18 in) and weigh up 700 g (1.5 lb); and Pacific herring grow to about 38 cm (15 in).

== Life cycle ==
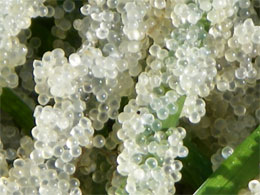
Herring spawn

At least one stock of Atlantic herring spawns in every month of the year. Each spawns at a different time and place (spring, summer, autumn, and winter herrings). Greenland populations spawn in 0–5 metres (0–16 feet) of water, while North Sea (bank) herrings spawn at down to 200 m (660 ft) in autumn. Eggs are laid on the sea bed, on rock, stones, gravel, sand or beds of algae. Females may deposit from 20,000 to 40,000 eggs, according to age and size, averaging about 30,000. In sexually mature herring, the genital organs grow before spawning, reaching about one-fifth of its total weight.

The eggs sink to the bottom, where they stick in layers or clumps to gravel, seaweed, or stones, by means of their mucous coating, or to any other objects on which they chance to settle.

If the egg layers are too thick they suffer from oxygen depletion and often die, entangled in a maze of mucus. They need substantial water microturbulence, generally provided by wave action or coastal currents. Survival is highest in crevices and behind solid structures, because predators feast on openly exposed eggs. The individual eggs are 1 to 1.4 mm (3/64 to 1/16 in) in diameter, depending on the size of the parent fish and also on the local race. Incubation time is about 40 days at 3 °C (37 °F), 15 days at 7 °C (45 °F), or 11 days at 10 °C (50 °F). Eggs die at temperatures above 19 °C (66 °F).

The larvae are 5 to 6 mm (3/16 to 1/4 in) long at hatching, with a small yolk sac that is absorbed by the time the larvae reach 10 mm (13/32 in). Only the eyes are well pigmented. The rest of the body is nearly transparent, virtually invisible under water and in natural lighting conditions.

The dorsal fin forms at 15 to 17 mm (19/32 to 21/32 in), the anal fin at about 30 mm (1 3/16 in)—the ventral fins are visible and the tail becomes well forked at 30 to 35 mm (1 3/8 in)— at about 40 mm (1 9/16 in), the larva begins to look like a herring.

Herring larvae are very slender and can easily be distinguished from all other young fish of their range by the location of the vent, which lies close to the base of the tail; however, distinguishing clupeoids one from another in their early stages requires critical examination, especially telling herring from sprats.

At one year, they are about 10 cm (4 in) long, and they first spawn at three years.

Egg to juvenile

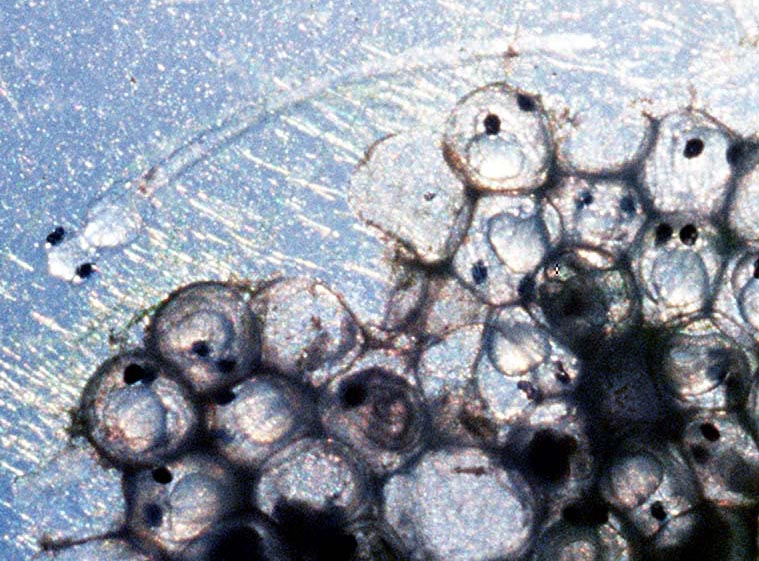
Transparent eggs with the yolk and eyes visible and one larva hatched

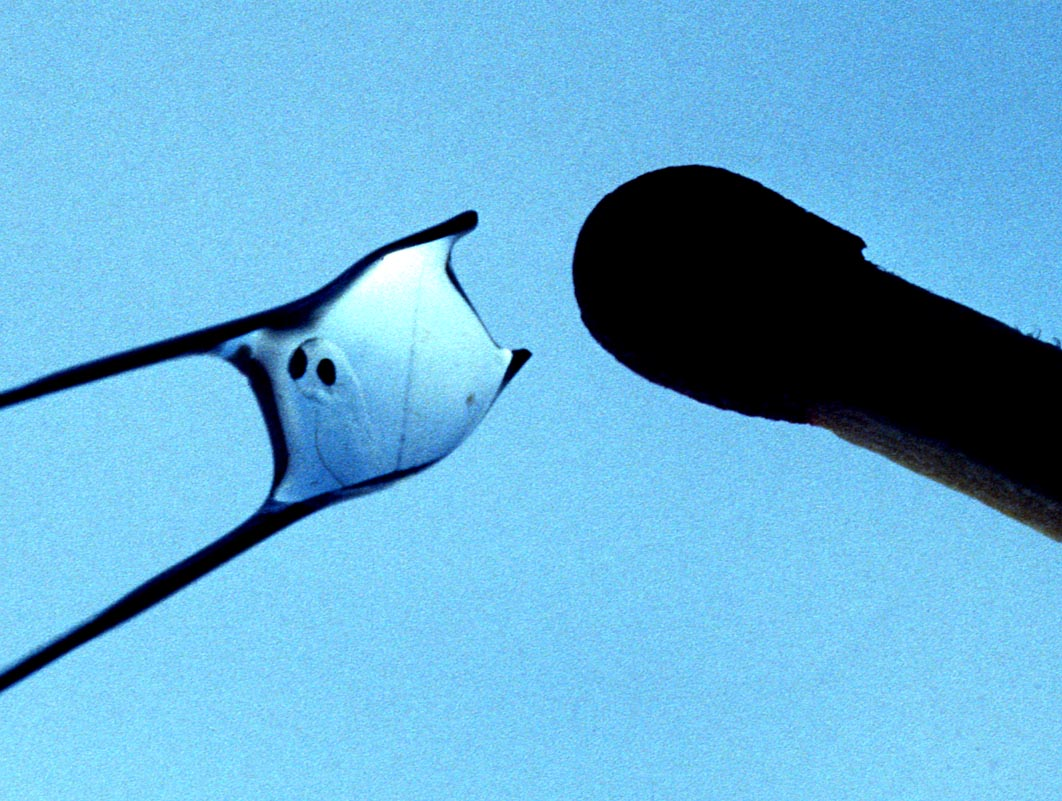
Freshly hatched larva in a drop of water beside a match to demonstrate how tiny it is: The black eyes and the yolk are visible.

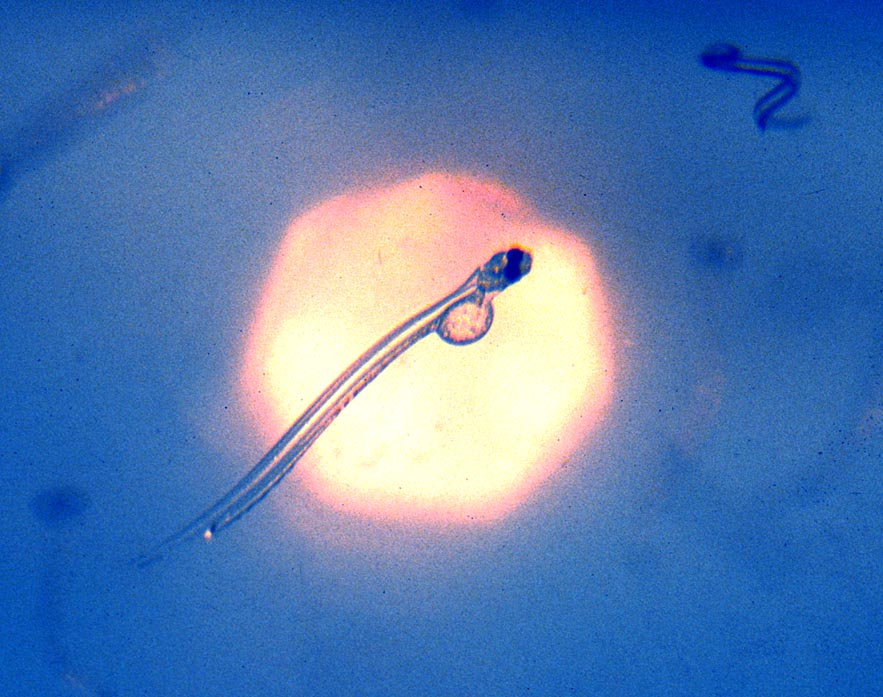
Young larva in typical oblique swimming position, with remaining yolk still attached: Another larva at the upper right is in the classical S-shape of the beginning phase of attacking a copepod.

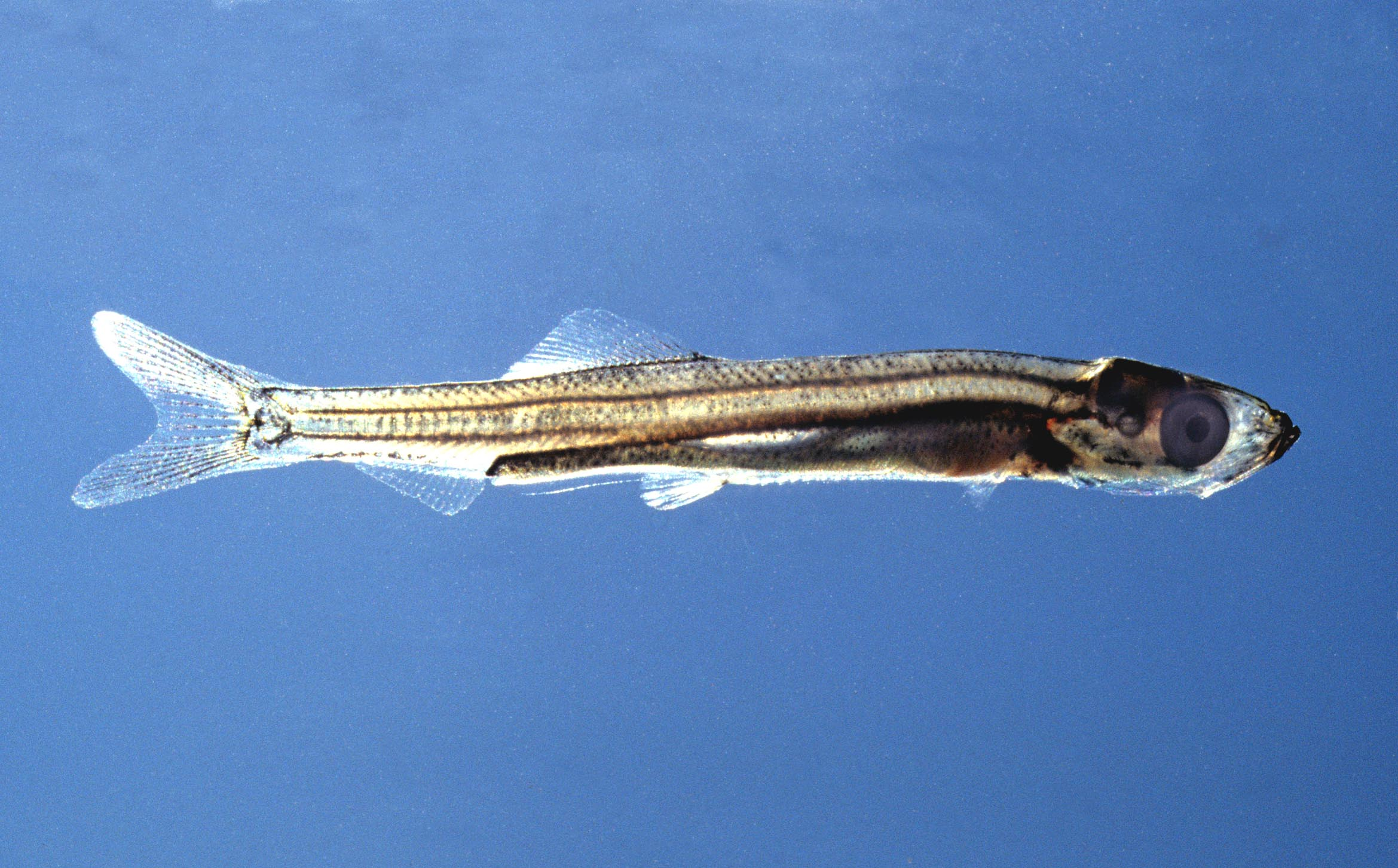
Still transparent juvenile herring, about 38 mm long and 3 months old: Visible are the otoliths, the gut, the silvery swimbladder, and the heart.

== Ecology ==
=== Prey ===
Herrings consume copepods, arrow worms, pelagic amphipods, mysids, and krill in the pelagic zone. Conversely, they are a central prey item or forage fish for higher trophic levels. The reasons for this success are still enigmatic; one speculation attributes their dominance to the huge, extremely fast cruising schools they inhabit.

Herring feed on phytoplankton, and as they mature, they start to consume larger organisms. They also feed on zooplankton, tiny animals found in oceanic surface waters, and small fish and fish larvae. Copepods and other tiny crustaceans are the most common zooplankton eaten by herring. During daylight, herring stay in the safety of deep water, feeding at the surface only at night when the chance of being seen by predators is less. They swim along with their mouths open, filtering the plankton from the water as it passes through their gills. Young herring mostly hunt copepods individually, by means of "particulate feeding" or "raptorial feeding", a feeding method also used by adult herring on larger prey items like krill. If prey concentrations reach very high levels, as in microlayers, at fronts, or directly below the surface, herring become filter feeders, driving several meters forward with wide open mouth and far expanded opercula, then closing and cleaning the gill rakers for a few milliseconds.

Copepods, the primary zooplankton, are a major item on the forage fish menu. Copepods are typically 1–2 mm (1/32–3/32 in) long, with a teardrop-shaped body. Some scientists say they form the largest animal biomass on the planet. Copepods are very alert and evasive. They have large antennae (see photo below left). When they spread their antennae, they can sense the pressure wave from an approaching fish and jump with great speed over a few centimetres. If copepod concentrations reach high levels, schooling herrings adopt a method called ram feeding. In the photo below, herring ram feed on a school of copepods. They swim with their mouths wide open and their operculae fully expanded.

Hunting copepods

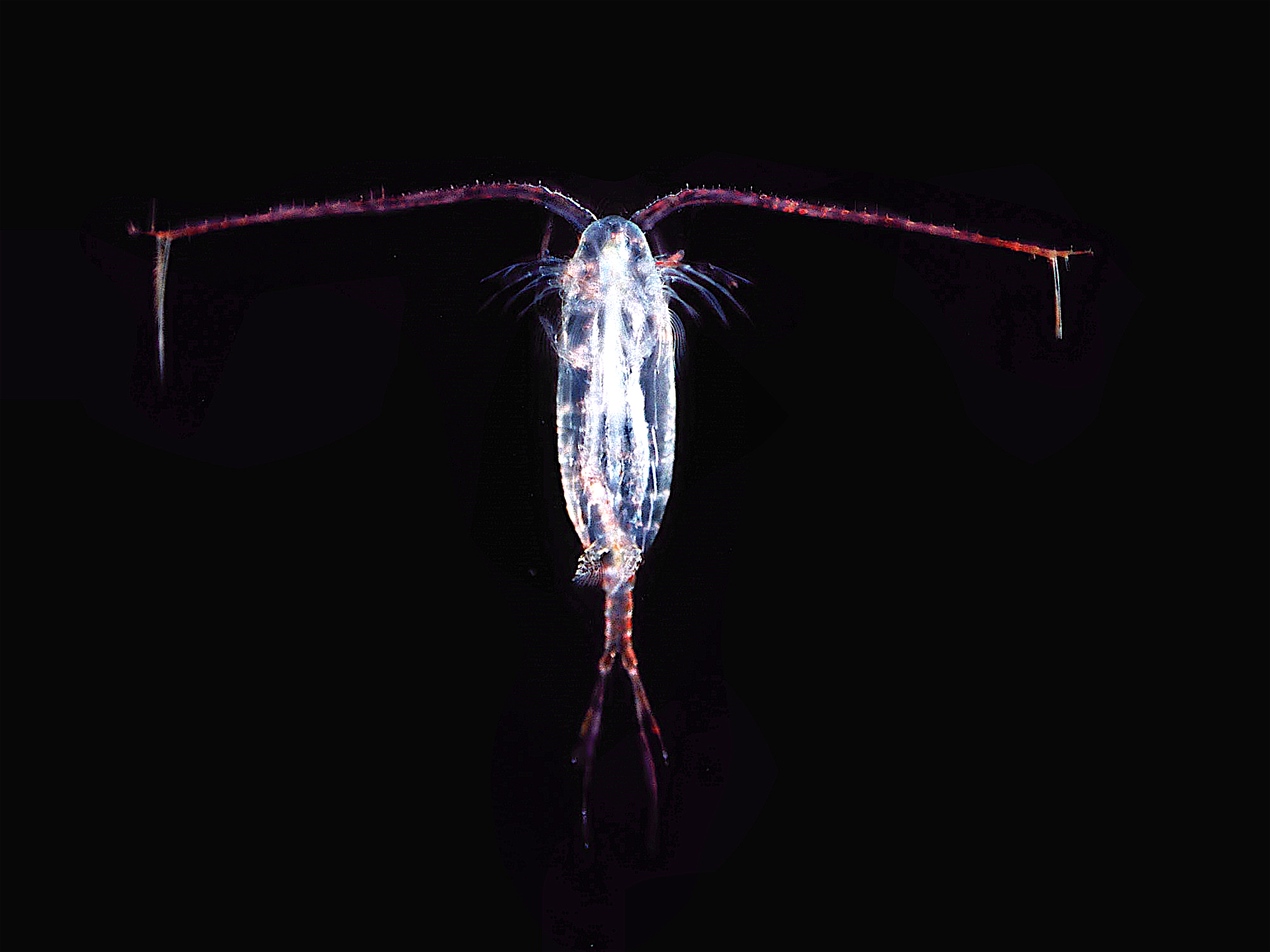
This copepod has its antennae spread. The antennae detect the pressure wave of an approaching fish.

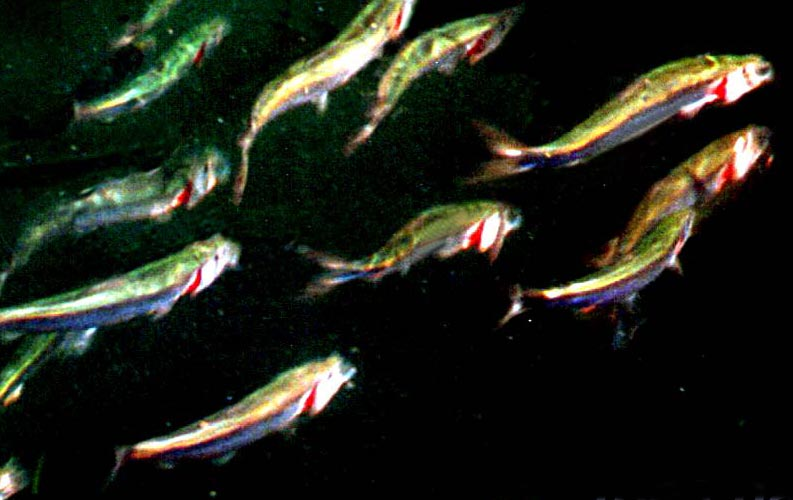
School of herrings ram feeding on a school of copepods with opercula and mouth expanded: The fish swim in a grid with a distance of the jump length of their prey, as indicated by the animation at the right.

Animation showing how herrings hunt in a synchronised way to capture an alert and evasive copepod

The fish swim in a grid where the distance between them is the same as the jump length of their prey, as indicated in the animation above right. In the animation, juvenile herring hunt the copepods in this synchronised way. The copepods sense with their antennae the pressure wave of an approaching herring and react with a fast escape jump. The length of the jump is fairly constant. The fish align themselves in a grid with this characteristic jump length. A copepod can dart about 80 times before it tires. After a jump, it takes it 60 milliseconds to spread its antennae again, and this time delay becomes its undoing, as the almost endless stream of herring allows a herring to eventually snap up the copepod. A single juvenile herring could never catch a large copepod.

Other pelagic prey eaten by herring includes fish eggs, larval snails, diatoms by herring larvae below 20 mm (13/16 in), tintinnids by larvae below 45 mm (1 3/4 in), molluscan larvae, menhaden larvae, krill, mysids, smaller fishes, pteropods, annelids, Calanus spp., Centropagidae, and Meganyctiphanes norvegica.

Herrings, along with Atlantic cod and sprat, are the most important commercial species to humans in the Baltic Sea. The analysis of the stomach contents of these fish indicate Atlantic cod is the top predator, preying on the herring and sprat. Sprat are competitive with herring for the same food resources. This is evident in the two species' vertical migration in the Baltic Sea, where they compete for the limited zooplankton available and necessary for their survival. Sprat are highly selective in their diet and eat only zooplankton, while herring are more eclectic, adjusting their diet as they grow in size. In the Baltic, copepods of the genus Acartia can be present in large numbers. However, they are small in size with a high escape response, so herring and sprat avoid trying to catch them. These copepods also tend to dwell more in surface waters, whereas herring and sprat, especially during the day, tend to dwell in deeper waters.

=== Predators ===
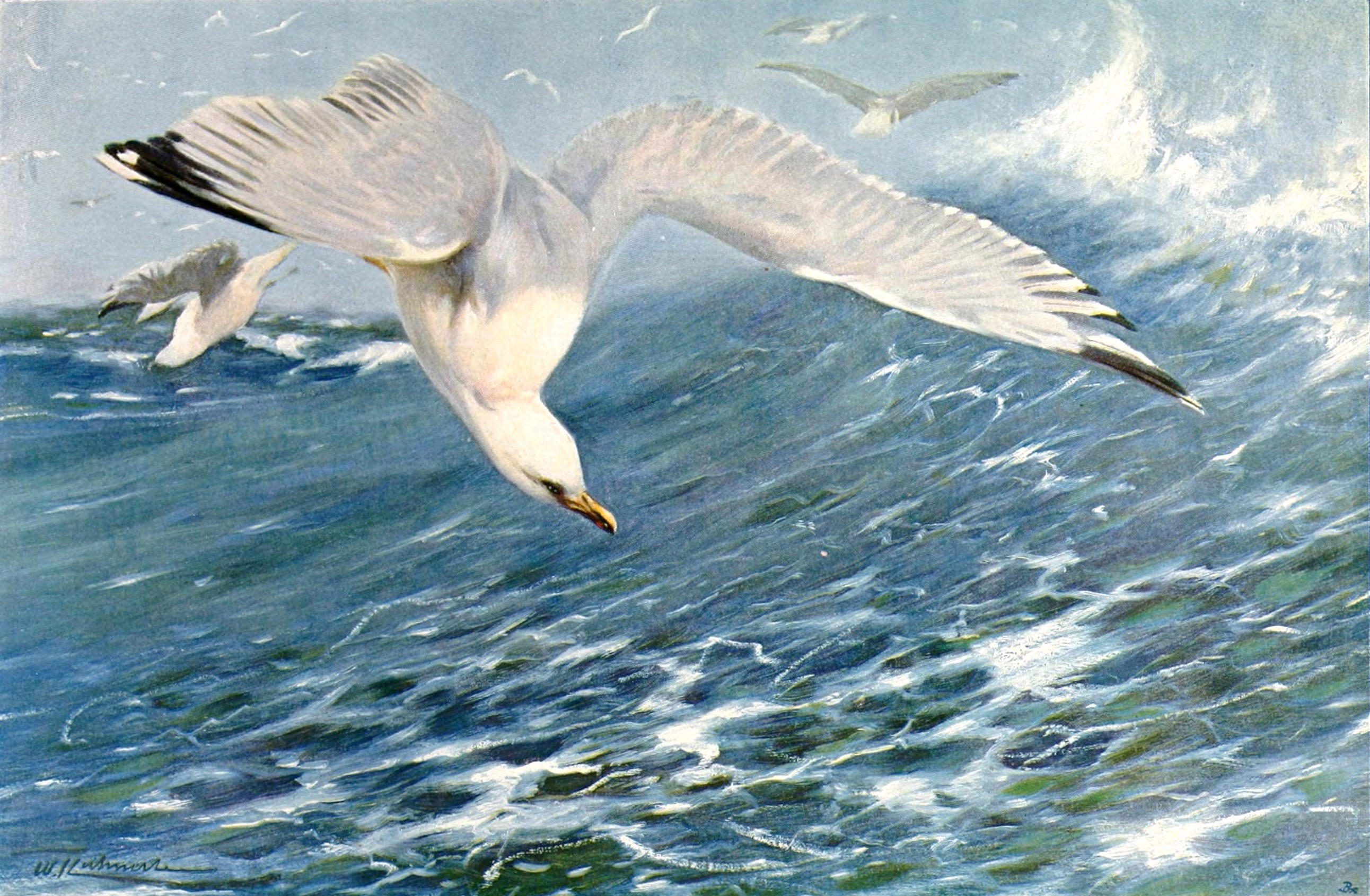
Seabirds, like this European herring gull, attack herring schools from above.

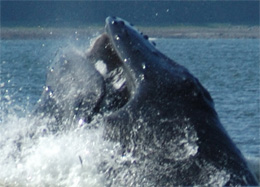
Humpback whales attack herring schools by lunging from below.

Predators of herring include seabirds, marine mammals such as dolphins, porpoises, whales, seals, and sea lions, predatory fish such as sharks, billfish, tuna, salmon, striped bass, cod, and halibut. Fishermen also catch and eat herring.

The predators often cooperate in groups, using different techniques to panic or herd a school of herring into a tight bait ball. Different predatory species then use different techniques to pick the fish off in the bait ball. The sailfish raises its sail to make it appear much larger. Swordfish charge at high speed through the bait balls, slashing with their swords to kill or stun prey. They then turn and return to consume their "catch". Thresher sharks use their long tails to stun the shoaling fish. These sharks compact their prey school by swimming around them and splashing the water with their tails, often in pairs or small groups. They then strike them sharply with the upper lobe of their tails to stun them. Spinner sharks charge vertically through the school, spinning on their axes with their mouths open and snapping all around. The sharks' momentum at the end of these spiraling runs often carries them into the air.

Some whales lunge feed on bait balls. Lunge feeding is an extreme feeding method, where the whale accelerates from below the bait ball to a high velocity and then opens its mouth to a large gape angle. This generates the water pressure required to expand its mouth and engulf and filter a huge amount of water and fish. Lunge feeding by rorquals, a family of huge baleen whales that includes the blue whale, is said to be the largest biomechanical event on Earth.

More images

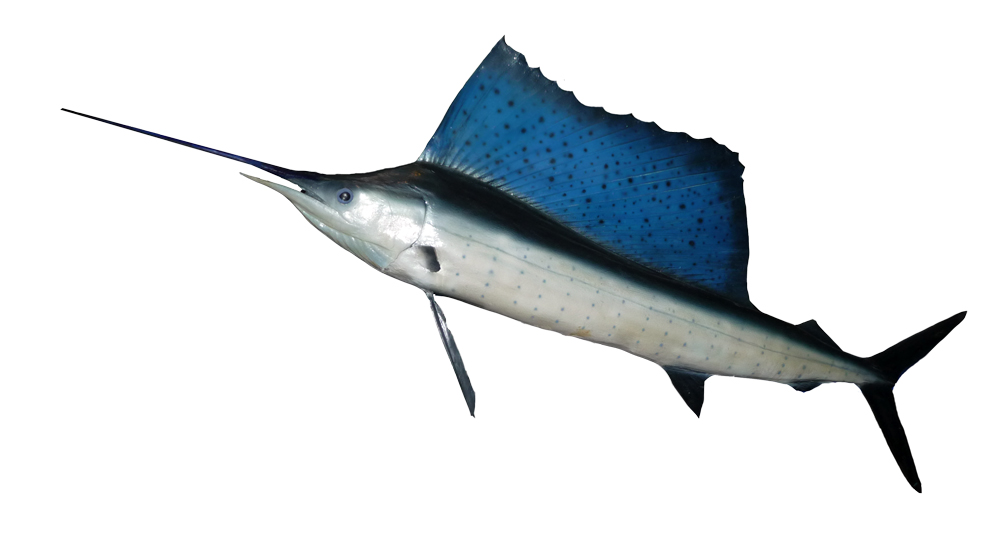
Sailfish herd herring schools with their sails

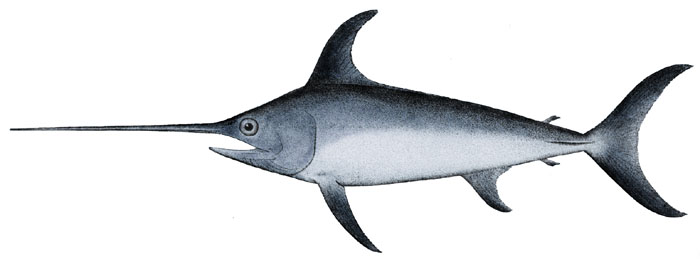
Swordfish slash at herrings with their swords

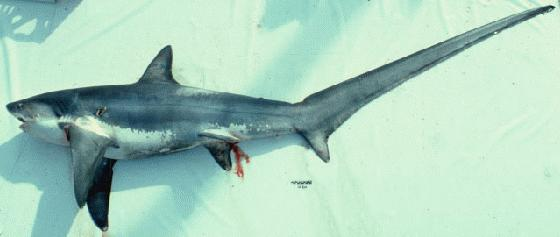
Thresher shark strike them with their tails

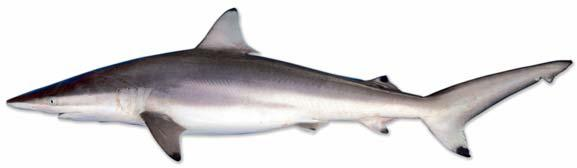
Spinner shark spin on their axis, snapping herrings as they go

Dolphins can hunt herring in groups

== Fisheries ==
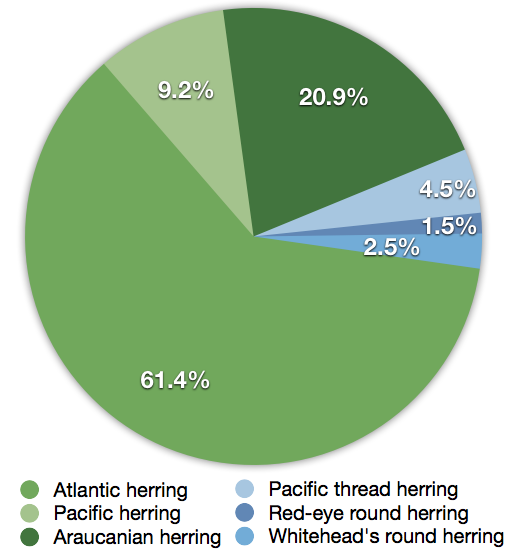
↑ All herrings 2010
Green = Clupea herrings

Adult herring are harvested for their flesh and eggs, and they are often used as baitfish. The trade in herring is an important sector of many economies around the world. In Europe, the fish has been called the "silver of the sea", and its trade has been so significant to many countries that it has been regarded as the most commercially important fishery in history.

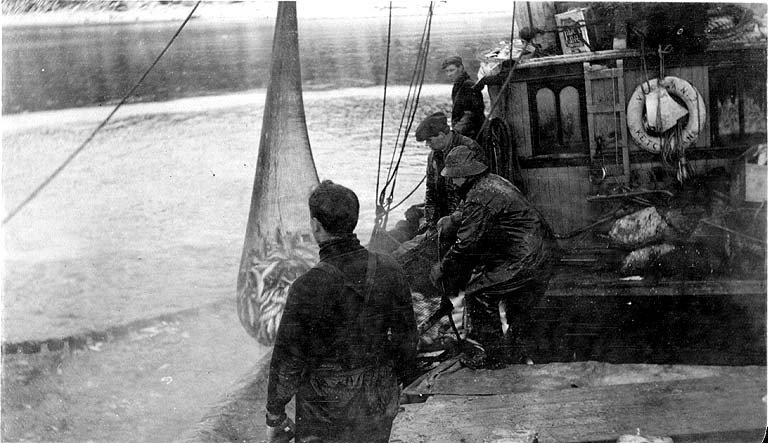
Purse seining for herring in southeast Alaska

Detailed time series
Global capture of herrings in tonnes reported by the FAO

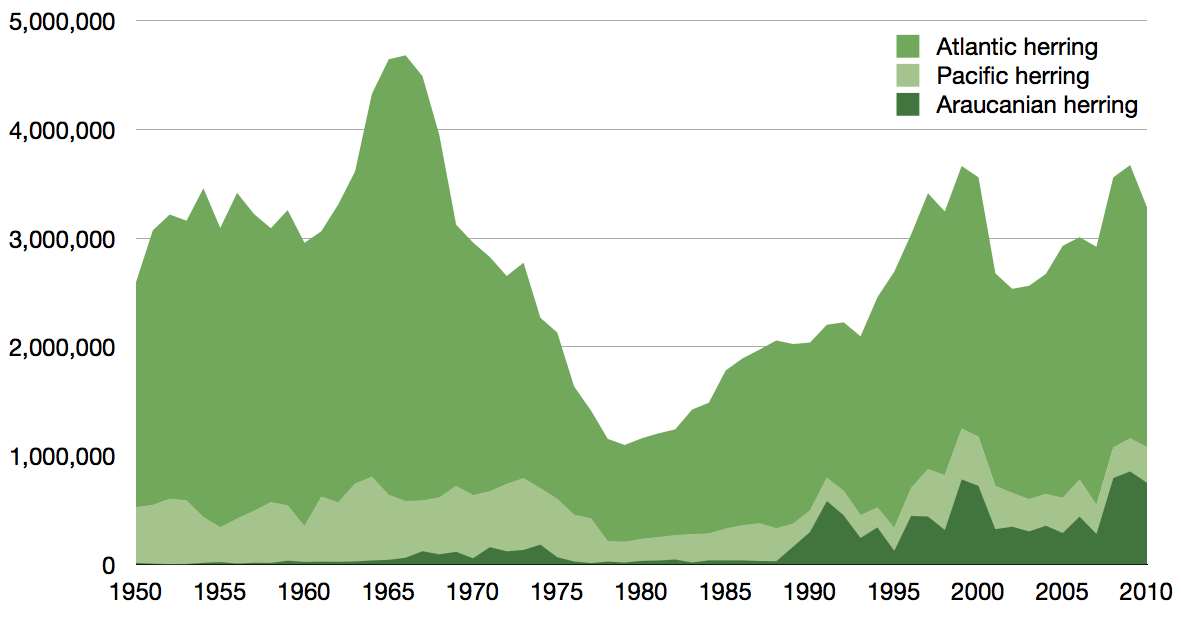
↑ Clupea herrings, 1950–2010

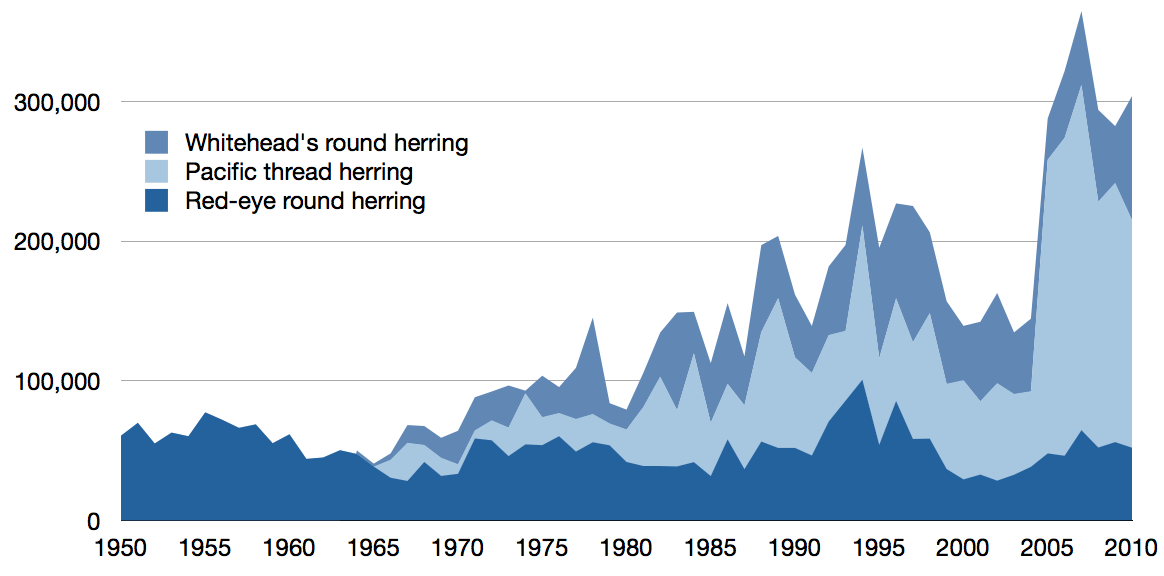
↑ Other herrings, 1950–2010

== As food ==
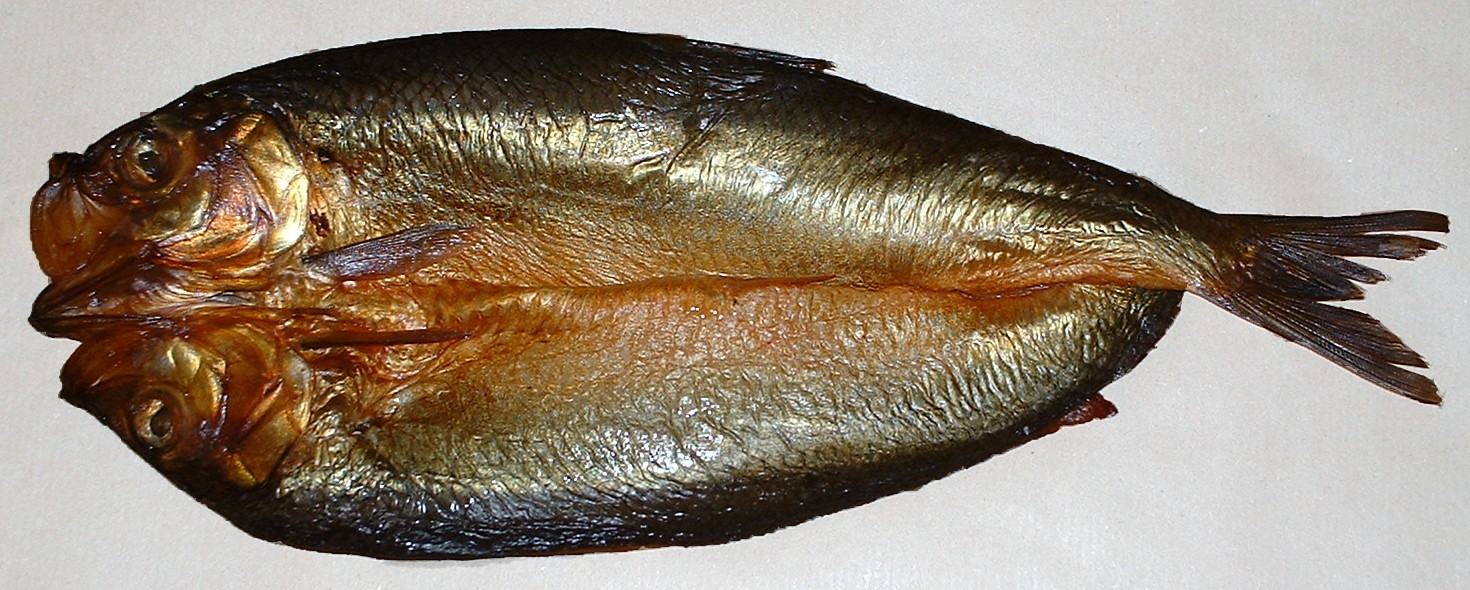
A kipper or split smoked herring

Herring has been a staple food source since at least 3000 BC. The fish is served numerous ways, and many regional recipes are used: eaten raw, fermented, pickled, or cured by other techniques, such as being smoked as kippers.

Herring are very high in the long-chain omega-3 fatty acids EPA and DHA. They are a source of vitamin D.

Water pollution influences the amount of herring that may be safely consumed. For example, large Baltic herring slightly exceeds recommended limits with respect to PCB and dioxin, although some sources point out that the cancer-reducing effect of omega-3 fatty acids is statistically stronger than the carcinogenic effect of PCBs and dioxins. The contaminant levels depend on the age of the fish which can be inferred from their size. Baltic herrings larger than 17 cm (6.7 in) may be eaten twice a month, while herrings smaller than 17 cm can be eaten freely. Mercury in fish also influences the amount of fish that women who are pregnant or planning to be pregnant within the next one or two years may safely eat.

== History ==
The herring has played a highly significant role in history both socially and economically. During the Middle Ages, herring prompted the founding of Great Yarmouth and Copenhagen and played a critical role in the medieval development of Amsterdam. In 1274, while on his deathbed at the monastery of Fossanova (south of Rome, Italy), when encouraged to eat something to regain his strength, Thomas Aquinas asked for fresh herring. In Scotland, the herring industry became an important part of the economy of North Sea coastal communities. It reached its peak in the late 19th century, when a herring boom saw Shetland and its town Lerwick become known as the "herring capital of Europe".

Historical images
Paintings

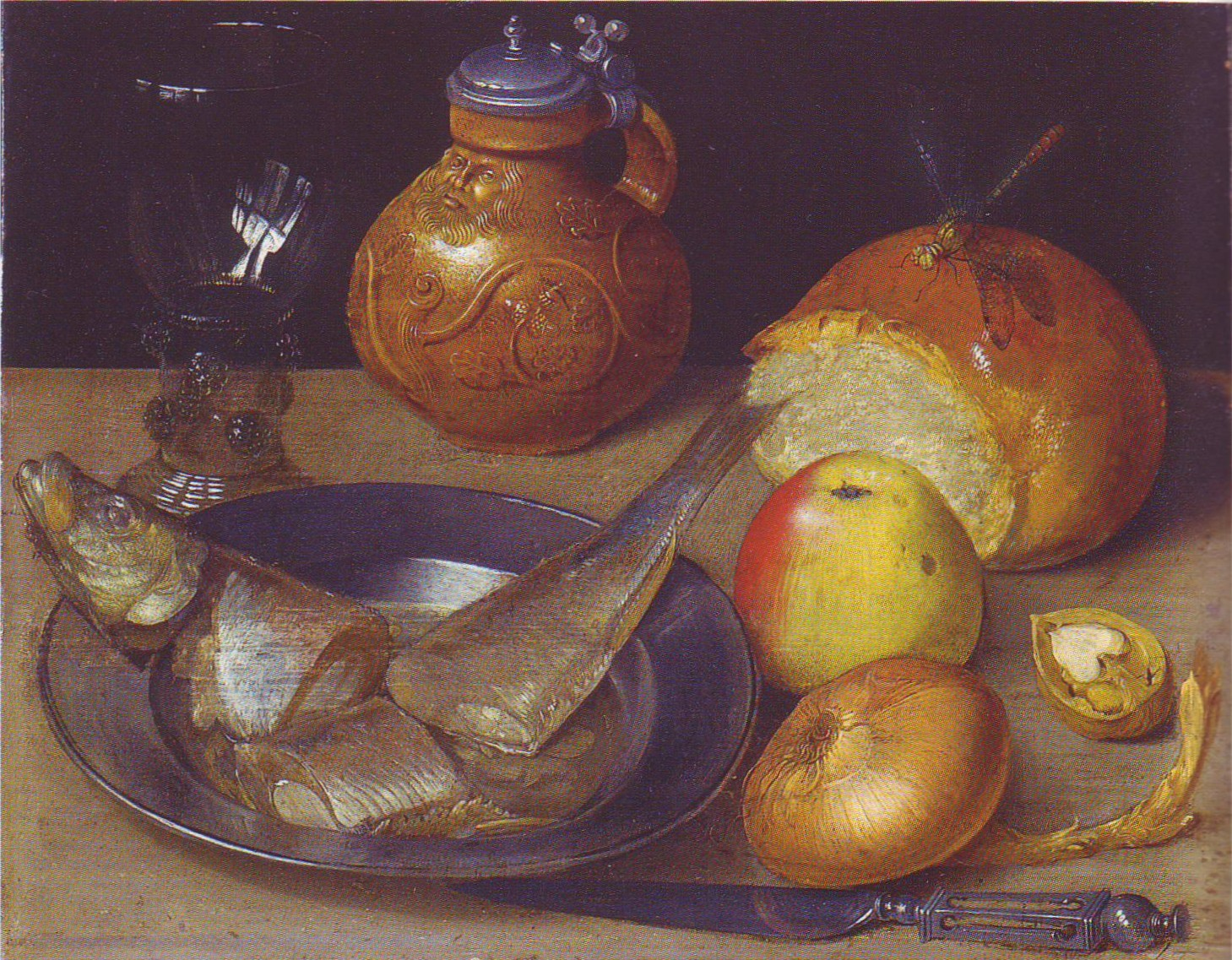
Still life with herring and stoneware jug, Georg Flegel, c. 1600

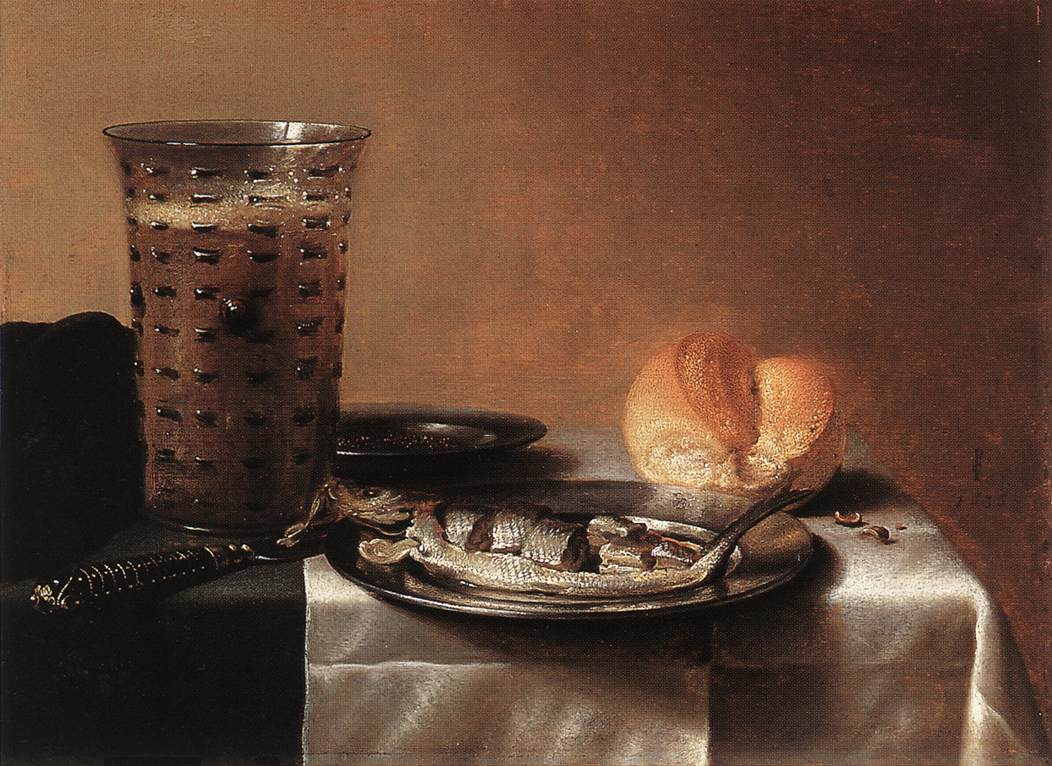
Still life with a glass of beer and smoked herring on a plate, Pieter Claesz 1636

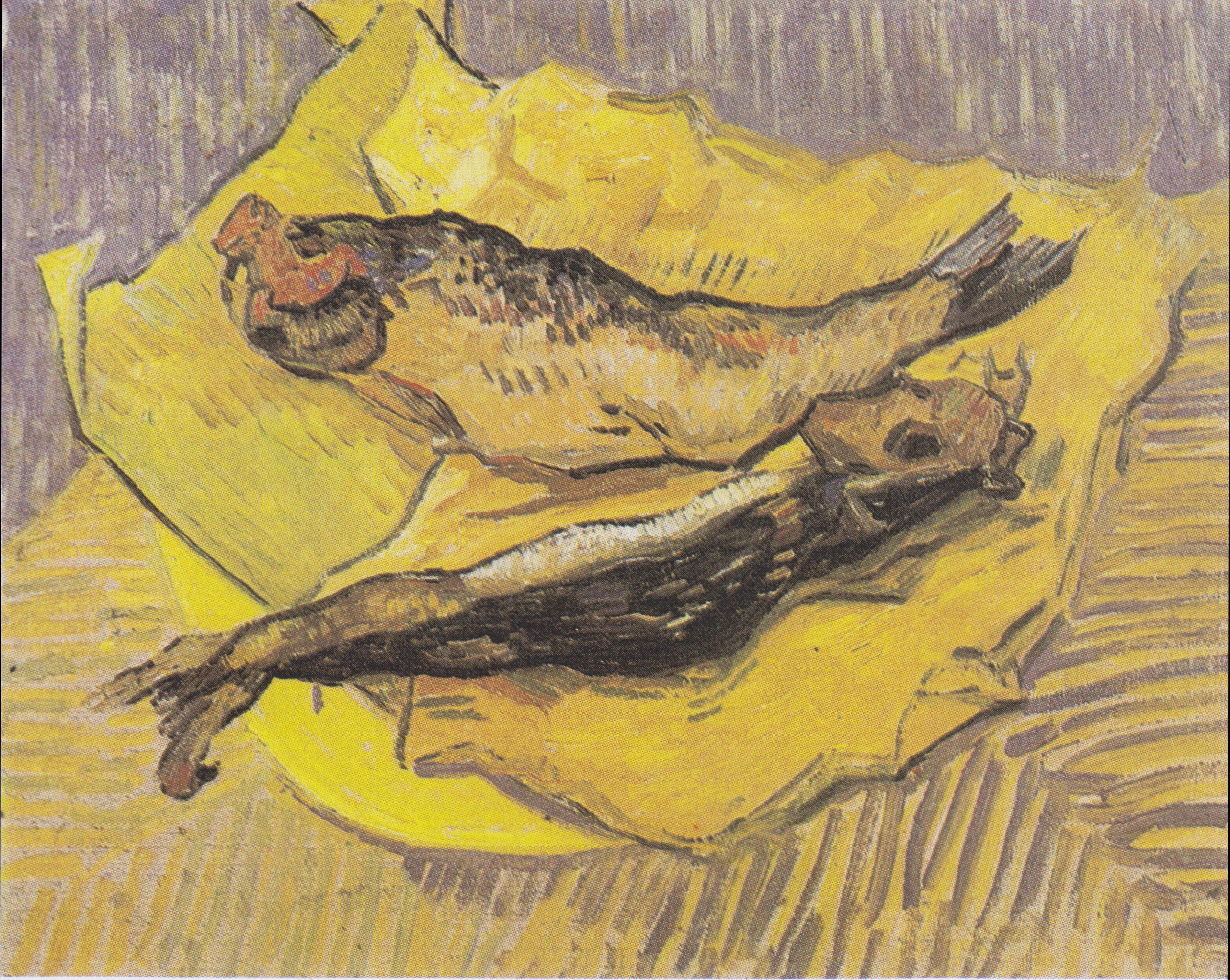
Still Life with smoked herrings on yellow paper, Van Gogh 1889

Herring boats

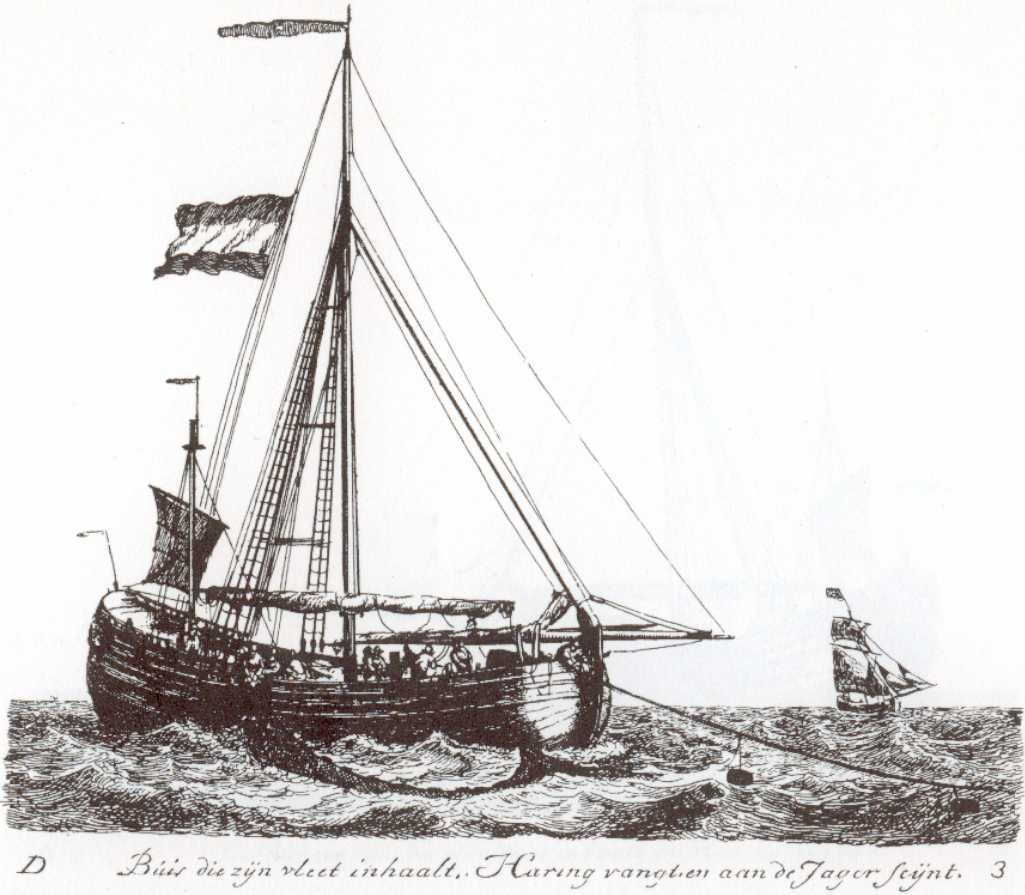
The herring buss 1789

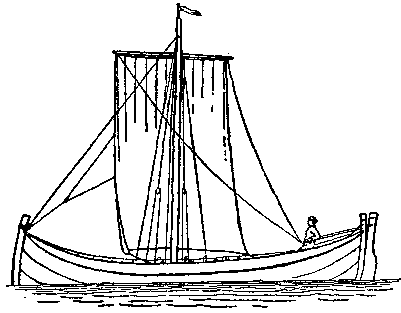
Norse herring boat

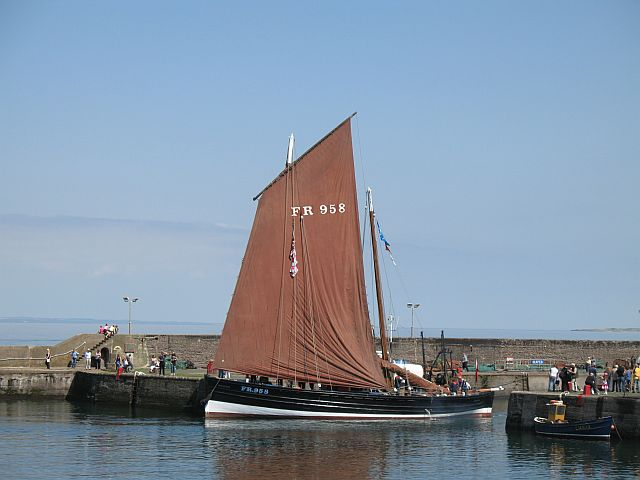
Reaper, typical of the herring boats that used to operate in Scotland during the early twentieth century

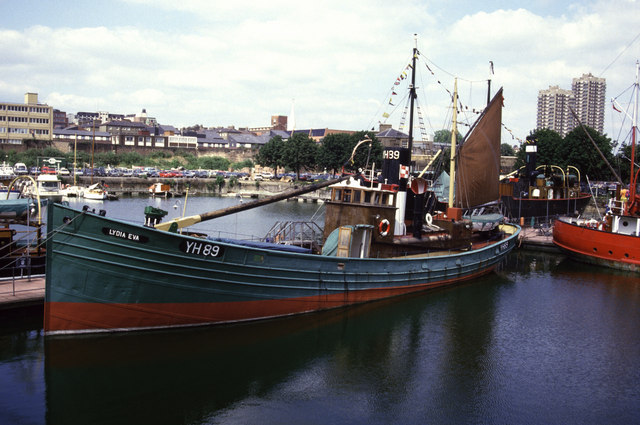
The last surviving steam drifter of the Great Yarmouth herring fleet, Norfolk. Drifters were designed to catch herrings in a long drift net.

General history

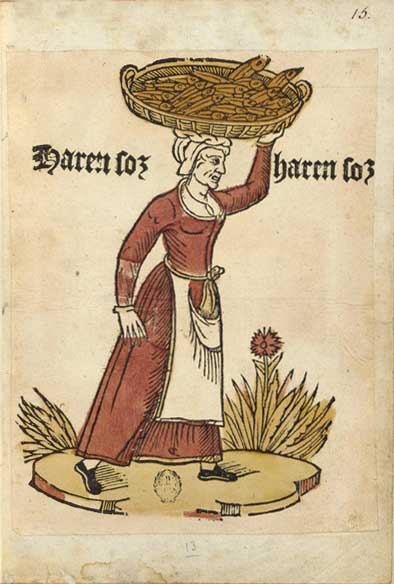
Herring monger, c. 1500

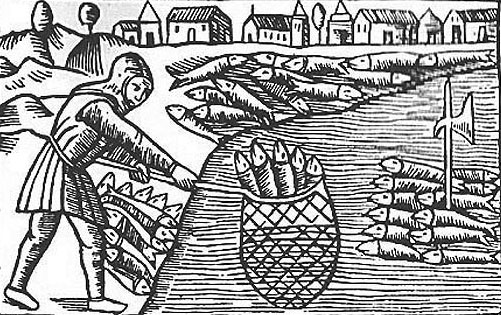
Medieval herring fishing in Scania, 1555

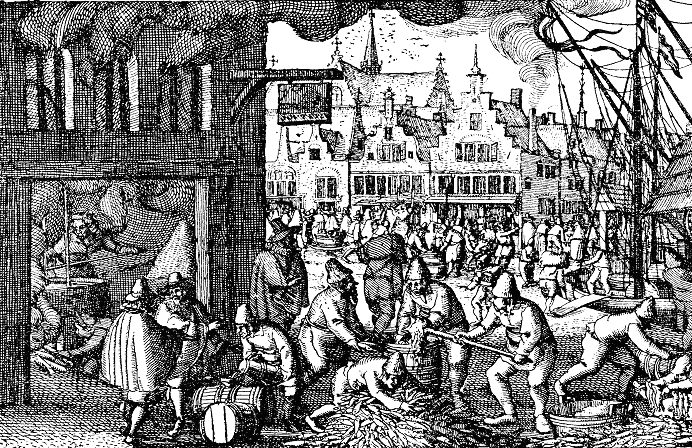
17th century herring factory in Amsterdam

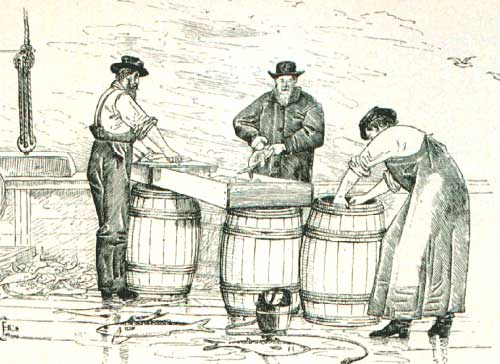
Processing river herrings

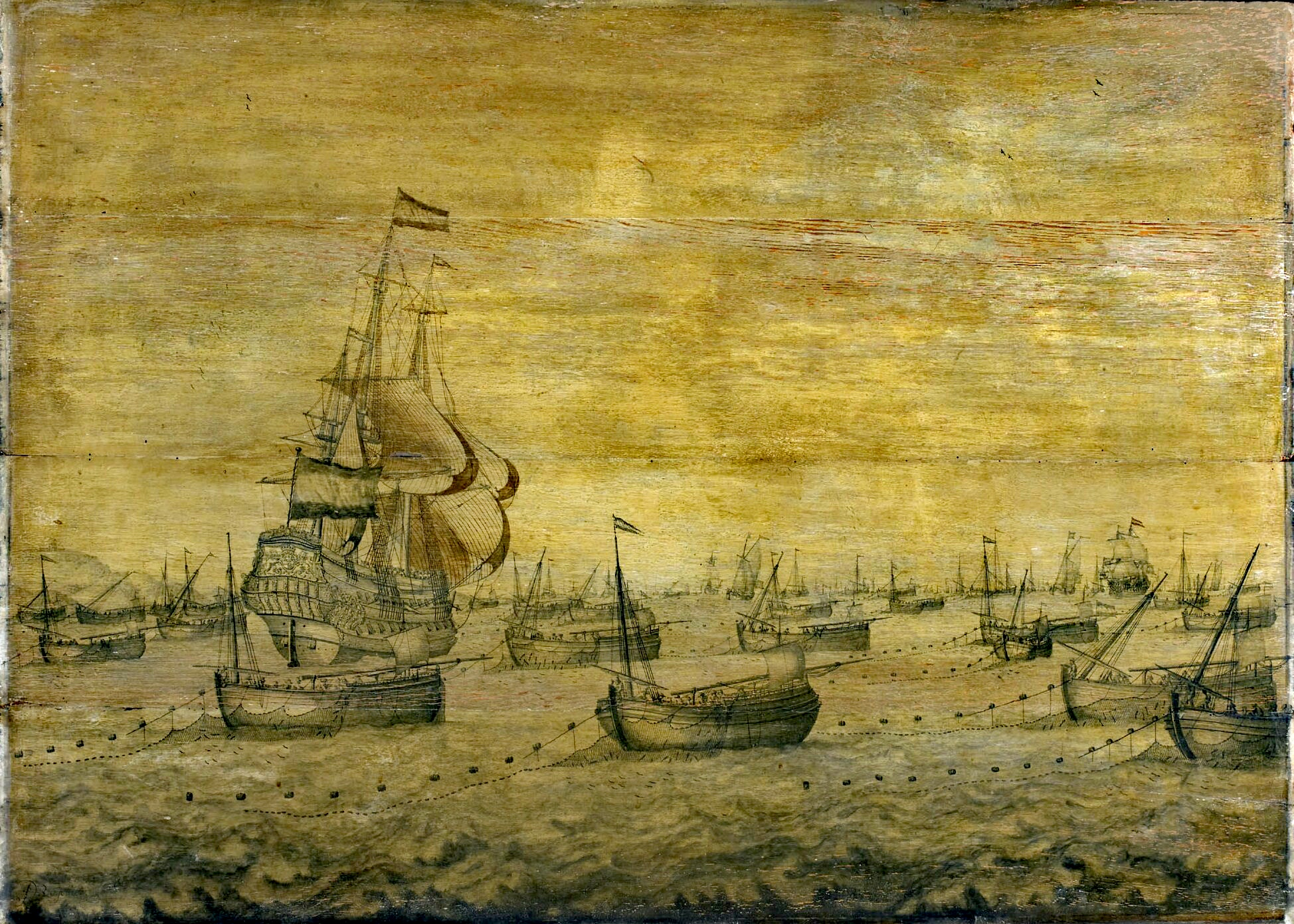
The Dutch herring fleet, c. 1700

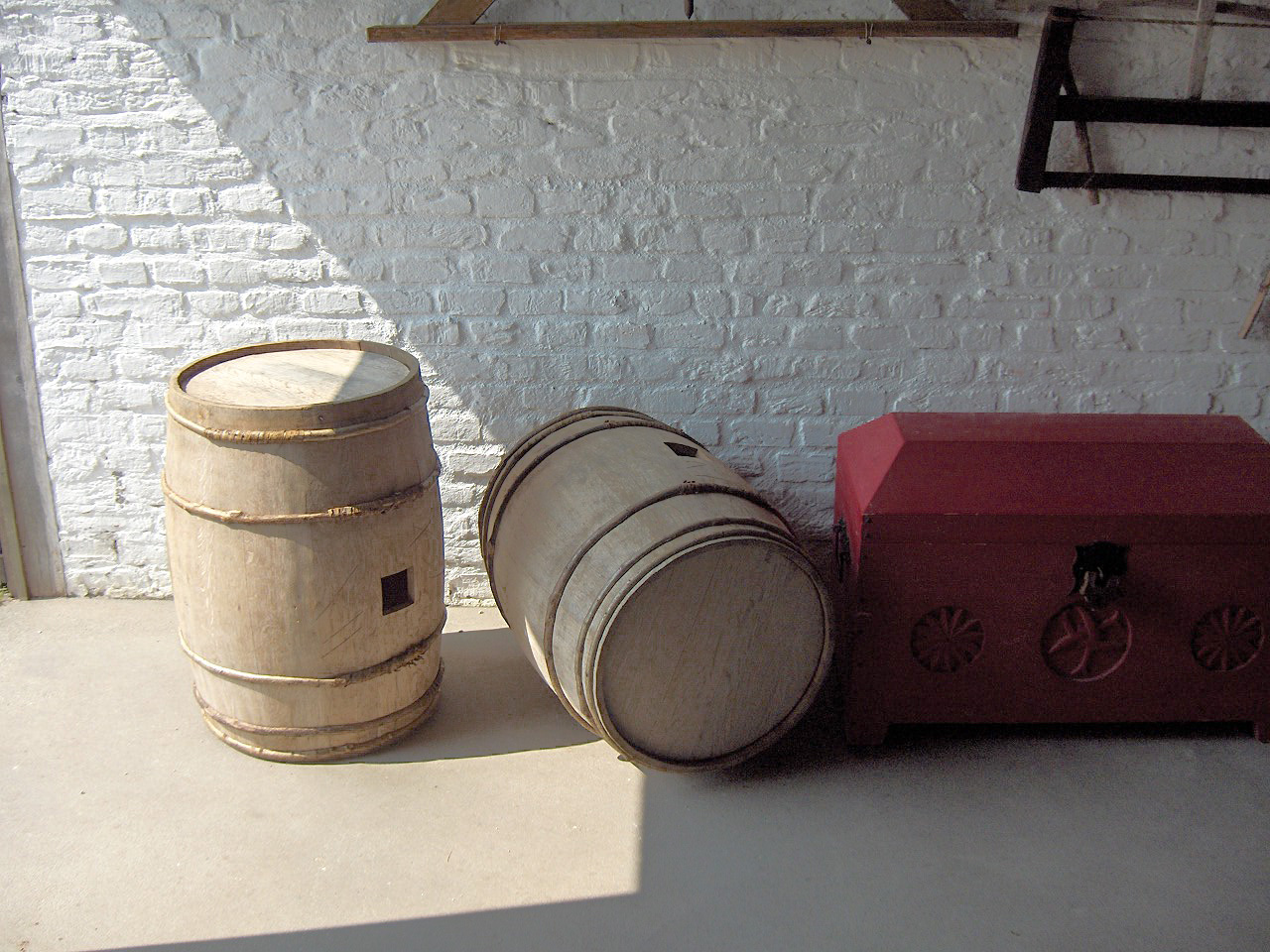
Barrels for storing salted herring, c. 1465 at the archaeological site of Walraversijde, Belgium

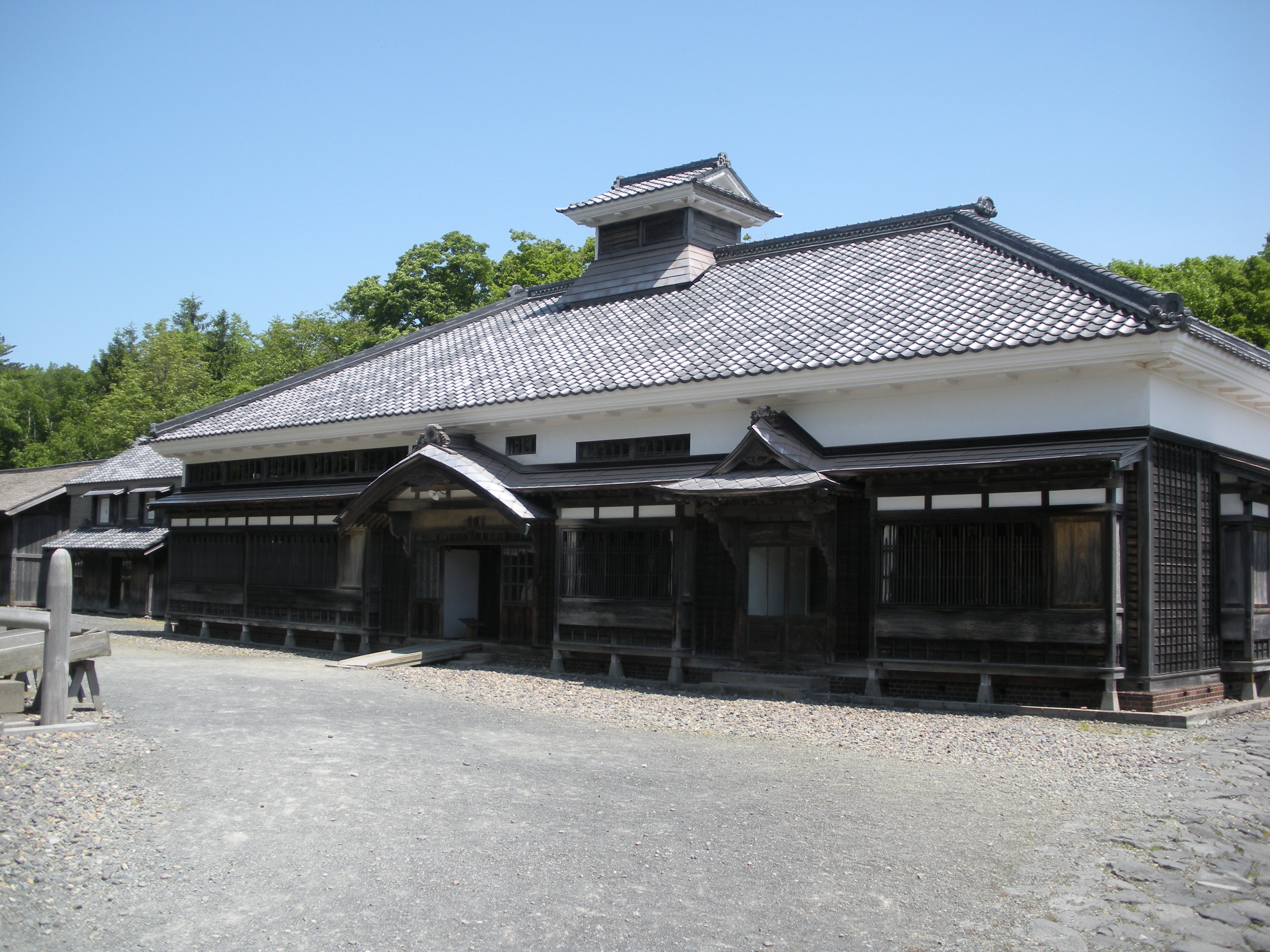
Japanese Pacific herring fisherman's house in the historic village of Hokkaidō, Sapporo

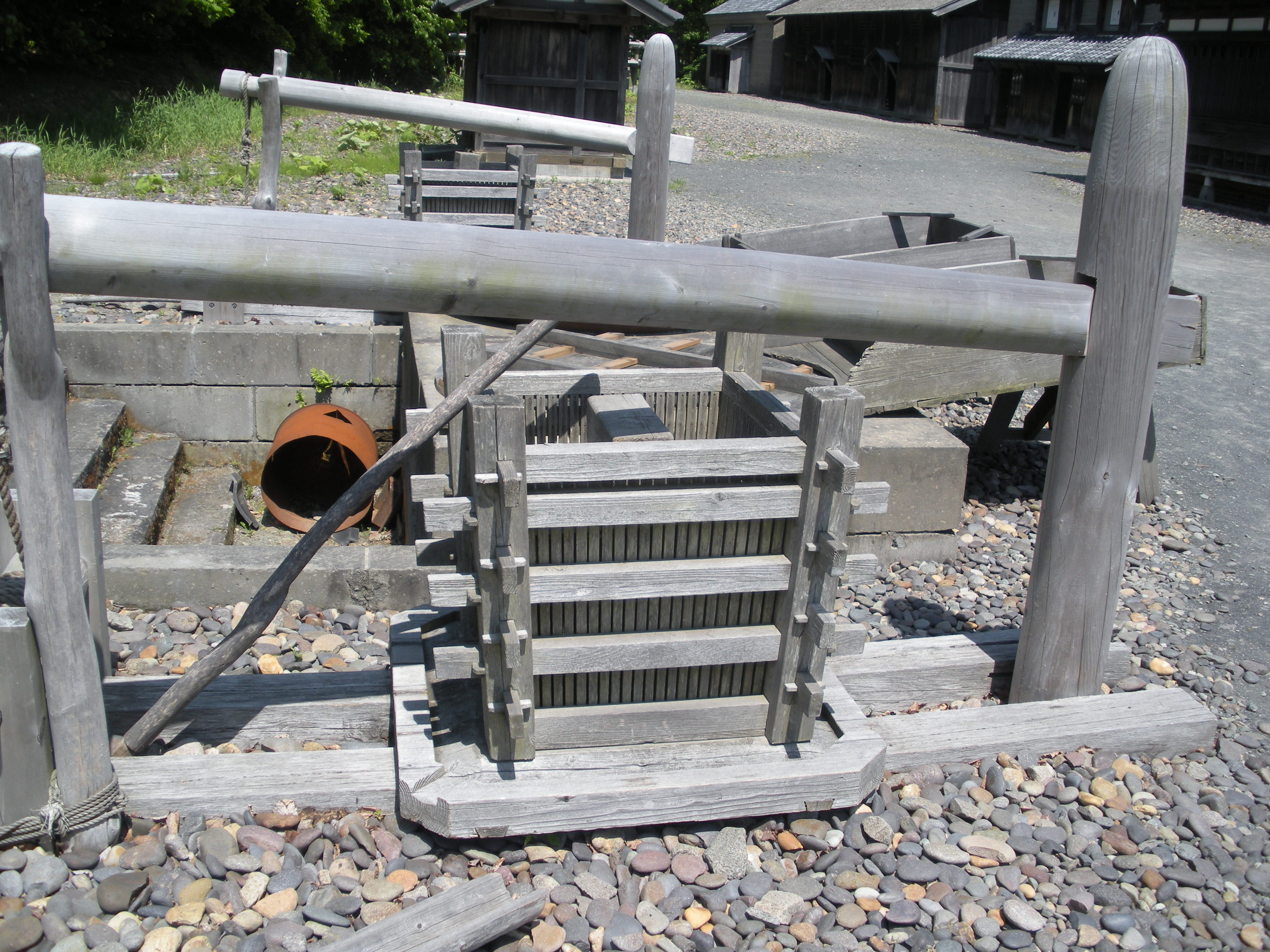
Press for extracting oil from herrings in the historic village

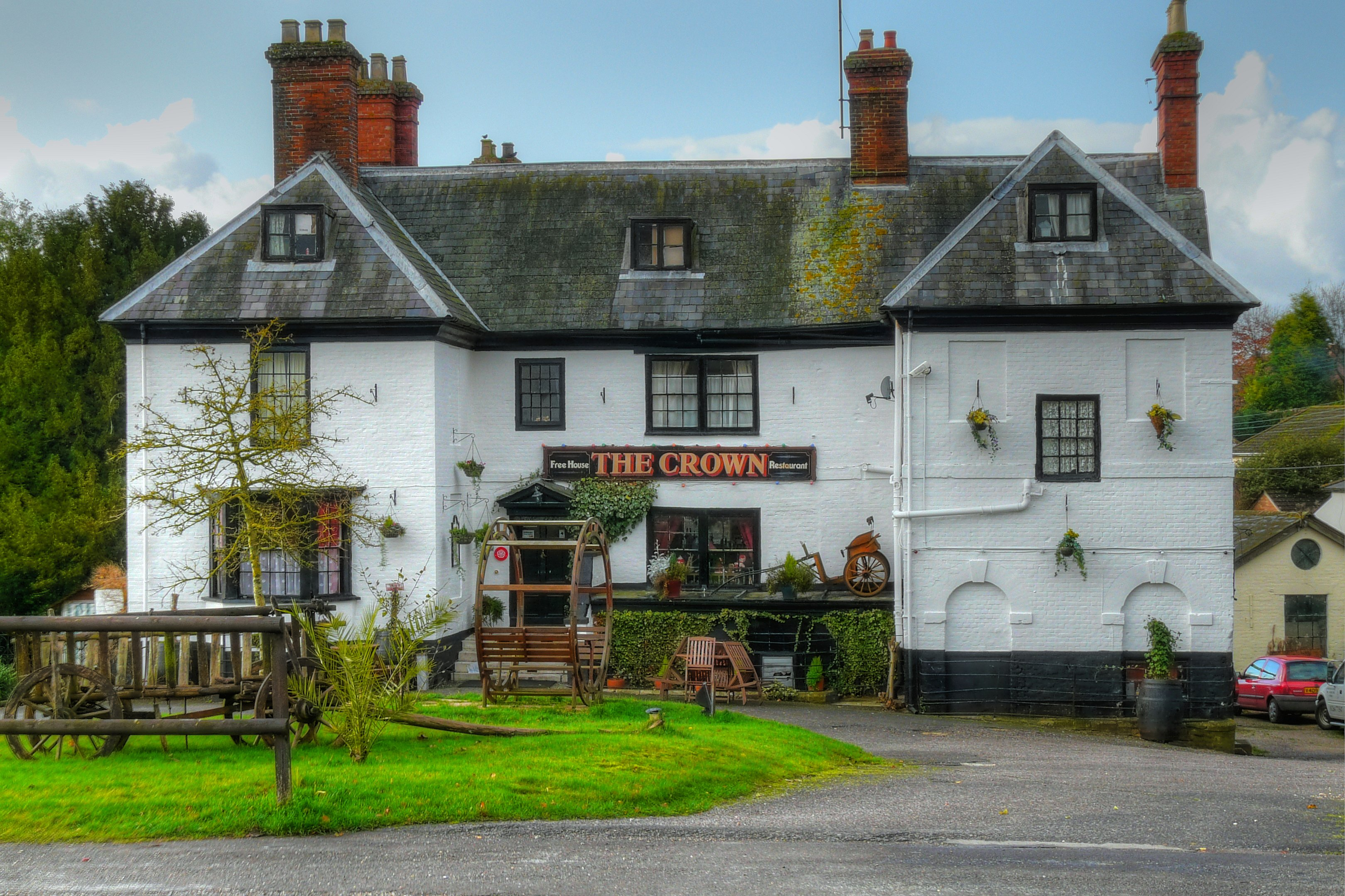
"Last Tuesday se'nnight three men met at the Crown Inn, Everley, and for a trifling wager, ate 6o red herrings, with three half-gallon loaves, and drank six gallons of beer" – 1792

== See also ==
- Herringbone pattern
