= Thai river sprat =

Conservation status
- Least Concern (IUCN 3.1)

Scientific classification
- Kingdom: Animalia
- Phylum: Chordata
- Class: Actinopterygii
- Order: Clupeiformes
- Family: Ehiravidae
- Genus: Clupeichthys
- Species: C. aesarnensis

Binomial name
- Clupeichthys aesarnensis Wongratana, 1983

Species of fish

The Thai river sprat (Clupeichthys aesarnensis) is a species of herring belonging to the family Ehiravidae, endemic to the Mekong basin in the Indochina region.

This is a small, slender, and elongated fish with a transparent body. The lips bear flat jaws with very small, curved teeth. The scales are thin and easily shed. The anal fin is divided into two sections, with the posterior portion forming a small separate lobe. The body is translucent with a pale yellow tint and a silver stripe running along the midline. The head is slightly darker, with a light greenish hue. Individuals typically reach a body length of about 4 cm (40.0 mm), with the largest specimens measuring up to 6 cm (60.0 mm).

In Thailand, this species is found in the Isan (northeastern region), particularly in large reservoirs such as Ubol Ratana Dam in Khon Kaen Province, Lam Pao Dam in Kalasin Province, Sirindhorn Dam in Ubon Ratchathani Province, and Sirikit Dam in Uttaradit Province. It forms large schools near the surface and midwater of these slow-moving or still water bodies.

Its diet consists mainly of insects, which it captures by leaping at the water surface, and zooplankton. The species is typically harvested at night using lift nets and lights. It is widely consumed and serves as an important local economic fish in Isan region, prepared in various ways, including fish sauce, dried fish, and fermented fish. The species has also been introduced into reservoirs in Malaysia and Indonesia, where it has become an important economic fish.

Local names in Thai include siu kaew (Thai: ซิวแก้ว, RTGS: siu kaew, pronounced [siw kɛ̂ːw], lit. 'glass minnow'), or taep kaew (แตบแก้ว, RTGS: taep kaew, pronounced [tɛ̀p kɛ̂ːw], lit. 'sword glass minnow').
