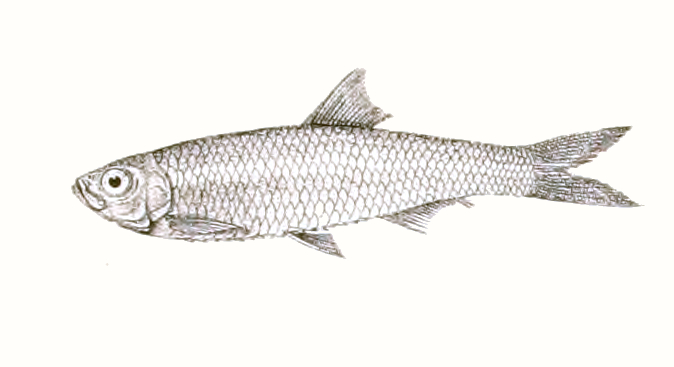

Conservation status
- Least Concern (IUCN 3.1)

Scientific classification
- Kingdom: Animalia
- Phylum: Chordata
- Class: Actinopterygii
- Order: Clupeiformes
- Family: Ehiravidae
- Genus: Corica
- Species: C. soborna

Binomial name
- Corica soborna F. Hamilton, 1822

= Corica soborna =

Genus of fishes

Corica soborna, also known as Ganges river sprat, is a species of fish in the Corica genus. It is known as Kechki in Bengali.

== Distribution ==
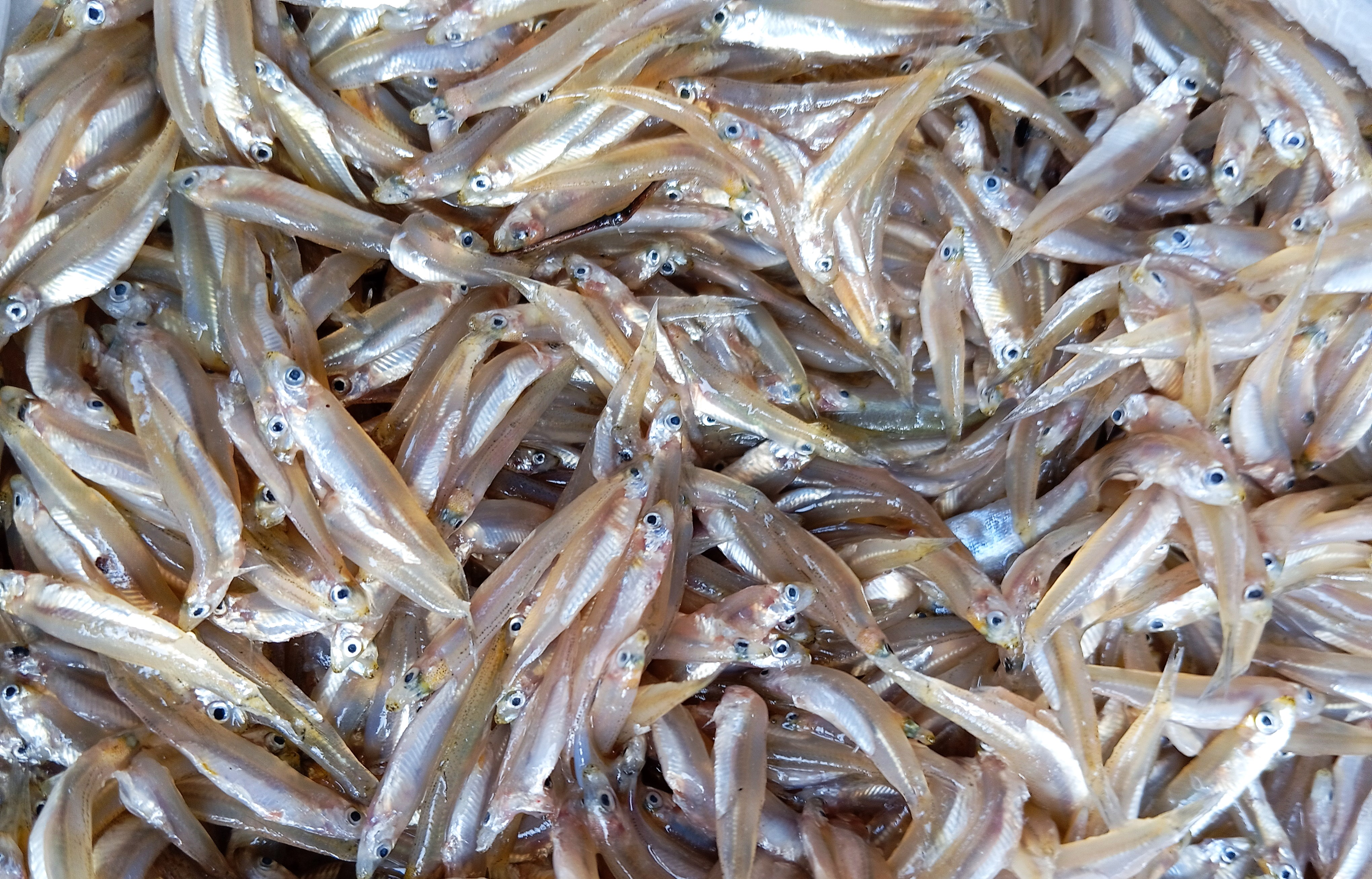
Ganges river sprat (Kachki fish), West Bengal, India

Corica soborna is found in Bangladesh, Brunei, India, Indonesia, Malaysia, and Thailand. It has been found in the Godavari river basin of Southern India.

== Uses ==
Corica soborna, called kachki, is cooked with potato in India. There are cooked as dry curry with potato in Bangladesh and usually caught in large numbers in Autumn.
