= Dayella =

Dayella may refer to:

- A fabric once manufactured by the makers of Viyella
- Dayella (fish), a genus of fish in the family Clupeidae
