= Toothed river herring =

Conservation status
- Data Deficient (IUCN 3.1)

Scientific classification
- Kingdom: Animalia
- Phylum: Chordata
- Class: Actinopterygii
- Order: Clupeiformes
- Family: Ehiravidae
- Genus: Clupeoides
- Species: C. papuensis

Binomial name
- Clupeoides papuensis (E. P. Ramsay & J. D. Ogilby, 1886)

Species of fish

The toothed river herring or Papuan river sprat (Clupeoides papuensis) is a species of fish in the family Clupeidae. It is found in New Guinea.
