= Bluntnosed sawtooth pellonuline =

Conservation status
- Least Concern (IUCN 3.1)

Scientific classification
- Kingdom: Animalia
- Phylum: Chordata
- Class: Actinopterygii
- Order: Clupeiformes
- Family: Dorosomatidae
- Genus: Potamothrissa
- Species: P. obtusirostris

Binomial name
- Potamothrissa obtusirostris (Boulenger, 1909)

Synonyms
- Microthrissa obtusirostris Boulenger, 1899; Microthrissa tenuis Boulenger, 1899; Pellonula obtusirostris Boulenger, 1909

Species of fish

The bluntnosed sawtooth pellonuline (Potamothrissa obtusirostris) is a fish species in the family Dorosomatidae, which also includes the gizzard shads and sardinellas. It is native to Central African Republic, Democratic Republic of the Congo and Republic of the Congo. The International Union for Conservation of Nature classifies this species as Least concern.
