= West African pygmy herring =

Sierrathrissa leonensis

Conservation status
- Least Concern (IUCN 3.1)

Scientific classification
- Kingdom: Animalia
- Phylum: Chordata
- Class: Actinopterygii
- Order: Clupeiformes
- Suborder: Clupeoidei
- Family: Dorosomatidae
- Genus: Sierrathrissa
- Species: S. leonensis

Binomial name
- Sierrathrissa leonensis Thys van den Audenaerde, 1969

Species of fish

The West African pygmy herring (Sierrathrissa leonensis) is a very small fish, reaching a maximum length of 3 centimetres (1.2 in) SL. It is a member of the clupeiform family Dorosomatidae in the freshwater systems of western and central Africa that includes such species as the Microthrissa royauxi of the Congo River basin and Limnothrissa miodon of Lake Tanganyika. It is the only species of its genus.

== Description ==
A very small fish which shows a reduction in size and some neoteny when compared to its larger relatives.

== Habitat and ecology ==
The West African pygmy herring is found in rivers and man-made lakes. It schools in open waters and to a maximum depth of around 2 to 8 m (6.6 to 26.2 ft); rising to about 30 cm (12 in) from the surface at night in Lake Volta. It feeds on plankton, especially cladocerans.

== Distribution ==
The West African pygmy herring has a widespread but patchy distribution from Senegal to Cameroon. In west Africa it occurs in Senegal River, Gambia River, Bia River, Niger River basin and Wouri River, as well as the man made Lake Volta and Lake Kainji. This species is native to Cameroon, Ivory Coast, Ghana, Nigeria, Gambia, Senegal and Sierra Leone.

== Fisheries and conservation ==
As the West African pygmy herring has a widespread distribution and is short lived with high resilience to exploitation, it is therefore listed as Least Concern. In Nigeria this species is subject to some commercial fishing for human consumption.

== Taxonomy ==
The West African pygmy herring was first described from Sierra Leone, but this was somewhat controversial and claims were made that the specimens were nothing more than the unmetamorphosed larva of a species of Pellonula or of Cynothrissa. However, when fully mature specimens of Sierrathrissa were described at 21-28mm SL, it was clear that these were not juveniles of other species.
