= Sundasalanx =

Scientific classification
- Kingdom: Animalia
- Phylum: Chordata
- Class: Actinopterygii
- Order: Clupeiformes
- Family: Ehiravidae
- Genus: Sundasalanx; T. R. Roberts, 1981

Type species
- Sundasalanx praecox T. R. Roberts, 1981

Genus of fishes

Sundasalanx, the Sundaland noodlefishes, is a genus of ray-finned fishes belonging to the family Ehiravidae. This genus of extremely small, sprat-like fishes is restricted to freshwater environments of Southeast Asia with Indonesia being home to the majority of species. The seven currently recognized species in this genus are:

- Sundasalanx malleti Siebert & Crimmen, 1997
- Sundasalanx megalops Siebert & Crimmen, 1997
- Sundasalanx mekongensis Britz & Kottelat, 1999
- Sundasalanx mesops Siebert & Crimmen, 1997
- Sundasalanx microps T. R. Roberts, 1981
- Sundasalanx platyrhynchus Siebert & Crimmen, 1997
- Sundasalanx praecox T. R. Roberts, 1981 (dwarf noodlefish)
