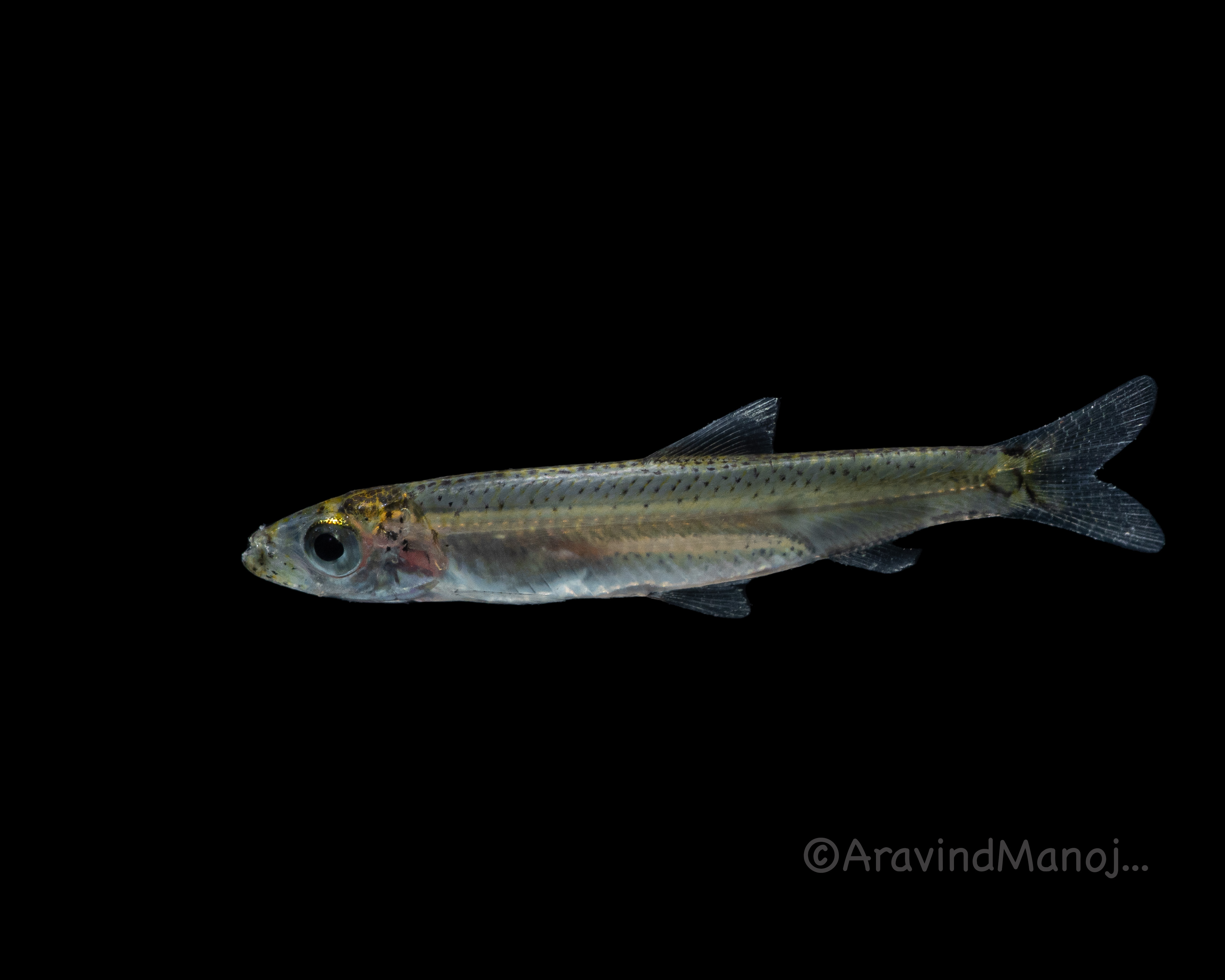

Conservation status
- Data Deficient (IUCN 3.1)

Scientific classification
- Kingdom: Animalia
- Phylum: Chordata
- Class: Actinopterygii
- Order: Clupeiformes
- Family: Ehiravidae
- Genus: Ehirava; Deraniyagala, 1929
- Species: E. fluviatilis

Binomial name
- Ehirava fluviatilis Deraniyagala, 1929

= Ehirava =

Species of fish

Ehirava fluviatilis, or the Malabar sprat, is a species of fish endemic to the rivers and coastal lagoons and estuaries of southern India and Sri Lanka. It is the only recognized species in the genus Ehirava. It grows to 5 cm (2.0 in) standard length.
