= Sanaga pygmy herring =

Conservation status
- Data Deficient (IUCN 3.1)

Scientific classification
- Kingdom: Animalia
- Phylum: Chordata
- Class: Actinopterygii
- Order: Clupeiformes
- Family: Dorosomatidae
- Genus: Thrattidion; T. R. Roberts, 1972
- Species: T. noctivagus

Binomial name
- Thrattidion noctivagus T. R. Roberts, 1972

Species of fish

The Sanaga pygmy herring (Thrattidion noctivagus) is an extremely small fish related to the herring which is endemic to the Sanaga River in Cameroon. It is the only species in its genus.
