= Nannothrissa =

Scientific classification
- Kingdom: Animalia
- Phylum: Chordata
- Class: Actinopterygii
- Order: Clupeiformes
- Family: Dorosomatidae
- Genus: Nannothrissa; Poll, 1965

Type species
- Microthrissa parva Regan, 1917

Genus of fishes

Nannothrissa is a genus of very small fish in the herring family, Dorosomatidae, endemic to the Congo River system in Africa. There are currently only two recognized species

== Species ==
- Nannothrissa parva (Regan, 1917) (Lake Tumba dwarf sprat)
- Nannothrissa stewarti Poll & T. R. Roberts, 1976 (Mai-ndombe dwarf sprat)
