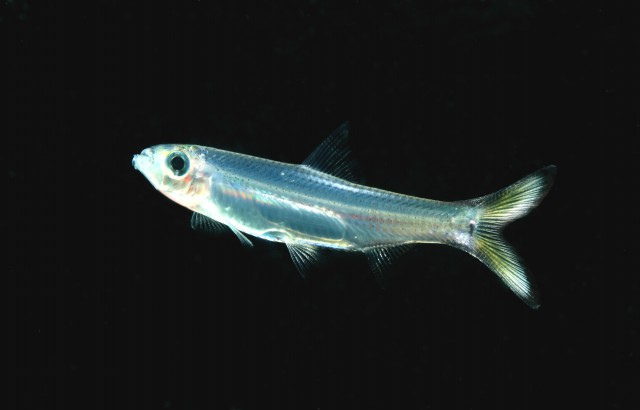
- Clupeoides borneensis

Scientific classification
- Domain: Eukaryota
- Kingdom: Animalia
- Phylum: Chordata
- Class: Actinopterygii
- Order: Clupeiformes
- Family: Ehiravidae
- Genus: Clupeoides; Bleeker, 1851

Type species
- Clupeoides borneensis Bleeker, 1851

= Clupeoides =

Genus of fishes

Clupeoides is a genus of sprats that occur in rivers in Southeast Asia. There are currently four recognized species in the genus.

== Species ==
- Clupeoides borneensis Bleeker, 1851 (Borneo river sprat)
- Clupeoides hypselosoma Bleeker, 1866 (Kalimantan river sprat)
- Clupeoides papuensis (E. P. Ramsay & J. D. Ogilby, 1886) (Papuan river sprat)
- Clupeoides venulosus M. C. W. Weber & de Beaufort, 1912 (West Irian river sprat)
