= Congothrissa =

Conservation status
- Data Deficient (IUCN 3.1)

Scientific classification
- Kingdom: Animalia
- Phylum: Chordata
- Class: Actinopterygii
- Order: Clupeiformes
- Family: Dorosomatidae
- Genus: Congothrissa (Poll, 1964)
- Species: C. gossei

Binomial name
- Congothrissa gossei (Poll, 1964)

Species of fish

Congothrissa gossei, or the smooth-belly pellonuline, is a herring relative that occurs in the Congo River system of Africa. It is the only member of the genus Congothrissa.
