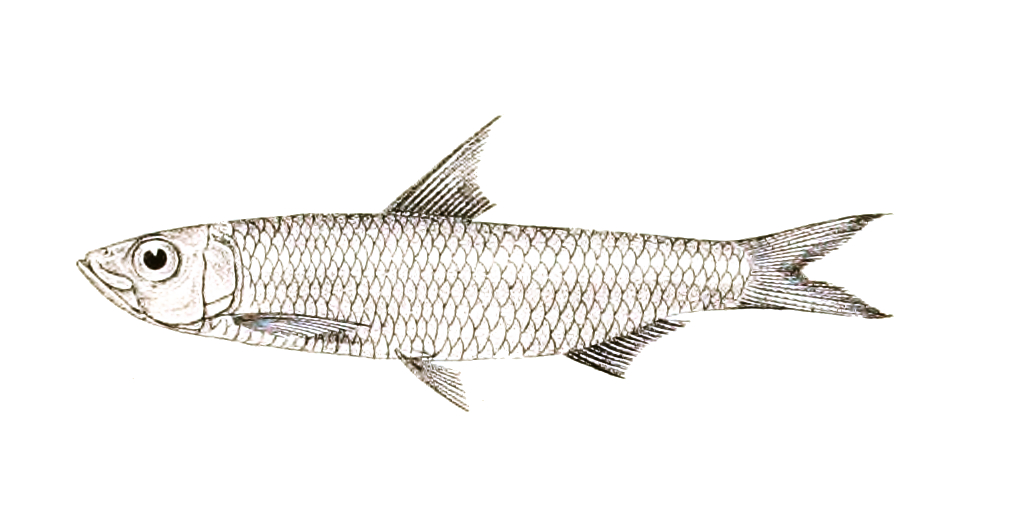

Conservation status
- Least Concern (IUCN 3.1)

Scientific classification
- Kingdom: Animalia
- Phylum: Chordata
- Class: Actinopterygii
- Superorder: Clupeomorpha
- Order: Clupeiformes
- Suborder: Clupeoidei
- Family: Ehiravidae
- Genus: Dayella; Talwar & Whitehead, 1972
- Species: D. malabarica

Binomial name
- Dayella malabarica (F. Day, 1873)

Synonyms
- Spratelloides malabaricus

= Day's round herring =

Species of fish

The Day's round herring (Dayella malabarica) is a relative of the herring that is endemic to southwestern India. It is the only species in its genus.

== Etymology ==
It is named after Francis Day who described the species in 1873.
