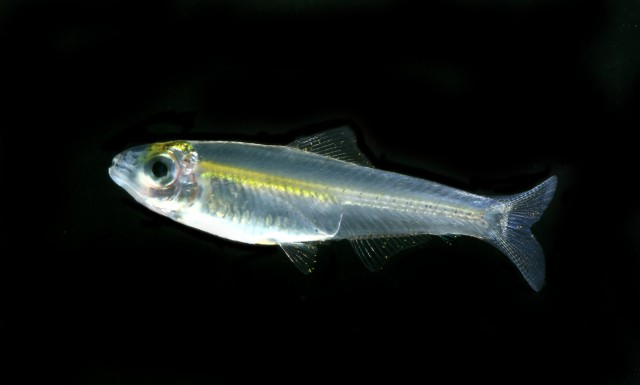
- Clupeichthys perakensis

Scientific classification
- Domain: Eukaryota
- Kingdom: Animalia
- Phylum: Chordata
- Class: Actinopterygii
- Order: Clupeiformes
- Family: Ehiravidae
- Genus: Clupeichthys; Bleeker, 1855

Type species
- Clupeichthys goniognathus Bleeker, 1855

= Clupeichthys =

Genus of fishes

Clupeichthys is a genus of sprats, herring-like fishes, that occur in rivers in Southeast Asia. There are currently four recognized species in the genus.

== Species ==
- Clupeichthys aesarnensis Wongratana, 1983 (Thai river sprat)
- Clupeichthys bleekeri (Hardenberg, 1936) (Kapuas river sprat)
- Clupeichthys goniognathus Bleeker, 1855 (Sumatran river sprat)
- Clupeichthys perakensis (Herre, 1936) (Perak river sprat)
