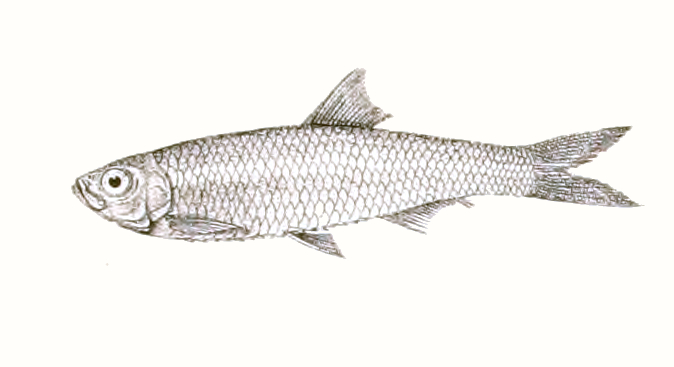
- Corica soborna

Scientific classification
- Kingdom: Animalia
- Phylum: Chordata
- Class: Actinopterygii
- Order: Clupeiformes
- Family: Ehiravidae
- Genus: Corica; F. Hamilton, 1822

Type species
- Corica soborna F. Hamilton, 1822

= Corica (fish) =

Genus of fishes

Corica is a small genus of sprats that occur in rivers in South Asia and Southeast Asia. Two described species are placed in the genus.

== Species ==
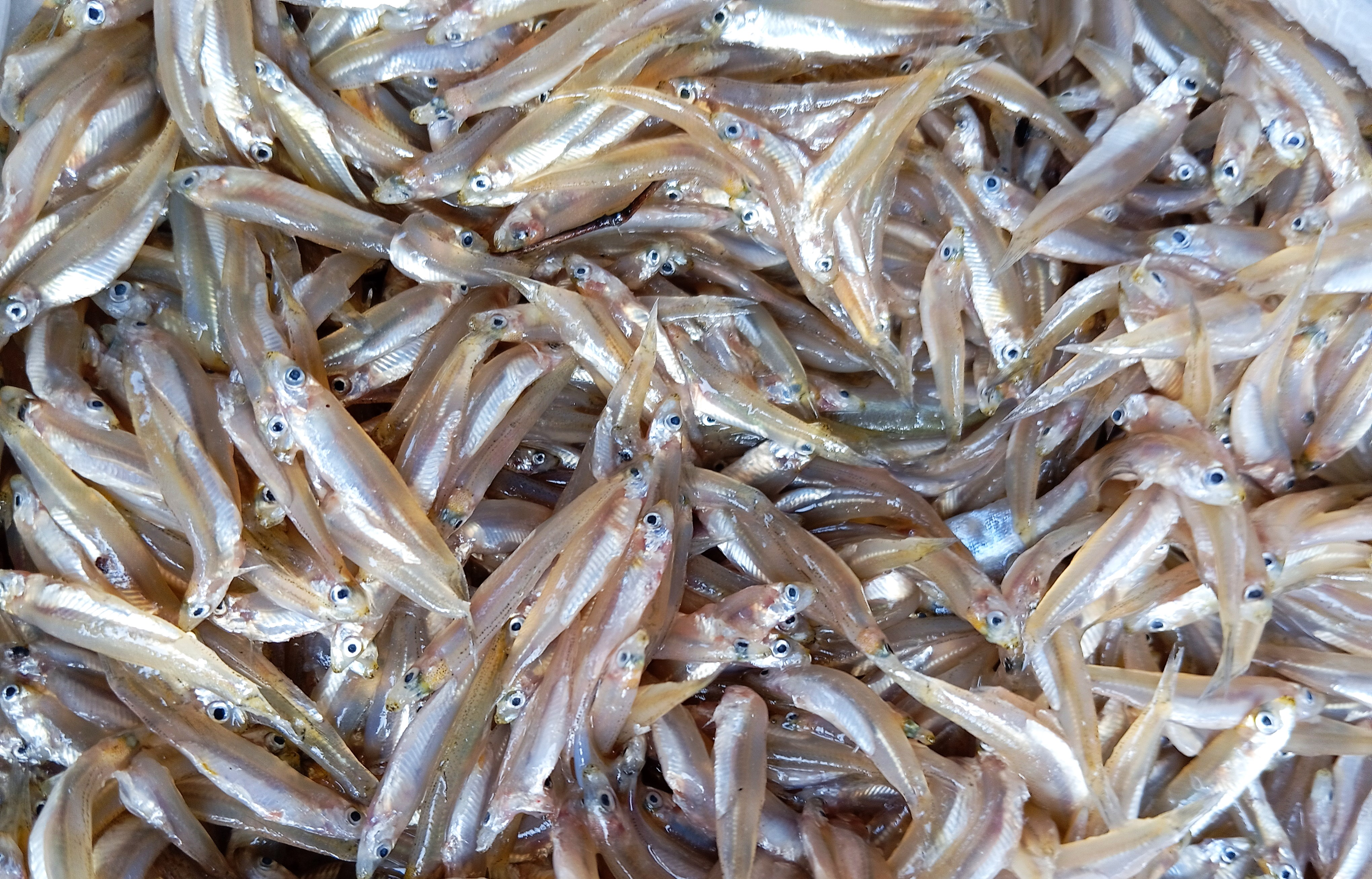
Ganges river sprat (Kachki fish), West Bengal, India

- Corica laciniata Fowler, 1935 (Bangkok river sprat)
- Corica soborna F. Hamilton, 1822 (Ganges river sprat)
