= Minyclupeoides =

Conservation status
- Least Concern (IUCN 3.1)

Scientific classification
- Kingdom: Animalia
- Phylum: Chordata
- Class: Actinopterygii
- Order: Clupeiformes
- Family: Ehiravidae
- Genus: Minyclupeoides; T. R. Roberts, 2008
- Species: M. dentibranchialus

Binomial name
- Minyclupeoides dentibranchialus T. R. Roberts, 2008

Species of fish

Minyclupeoides dentibranchialus is an extremely small fish (2.3 centimetres (0.91 in)) found only in the Mekong Basin in Cambodia. It is the only species in its genus.
