= Two-finned round herring =

Conservation status
- Data Deficient (IUCN 3.1)

Scientific classification
- Kingdom: Animalia
- Phylum: Chordata
- Class: Actinopterygii
- Order: Clupeiformes
- Family: Ehiravidae
- Genus: Spratellomorpha; Bertin in Angel, Bertin and Guibé, 1946
- Species: S. bianalis

Binomial name
- Spratellomorpha bianalis (Bertin, 1940)

Species of fish

The two-finned round herring (Spratellomorpha bianalis) is a species of fish in the family Clupeidae. It is endemic to Madagascar. Its natural habitat is rivers. It is the only species in its genus.
