= Gilchristella =

Gilchristella aestuaria

Conservation status
- Least Concern (IUCN 3.1)

Scientific classification
- Kingdom: Animalia
- Phylum: Chordata
- Class: Actinopterygii
- Order: Clupeiformes
- Family: Ehiravidae
- Genus: Gilchristella; Fowler, 1935
- Species: G. aestuaria

Binomial name
- Gilchristella aestuaria (Gilchrist, 1913)

Synonyms
- Spratelloides aestuarius Gilchrist, 1913

Species of fish

Gilchristella aestuaria, the Gilchrist's round herring or estuarine round-herring, is a member of the family Ehiravidae that occurs off the coasts of Southern Africa. It is the only species in its genus, which was named for John Dow Fisher Gilchrist (1866–1926).

== Information ==
There are no indications of major threats to this species. It is considered to be of least concern for becoming an endangered species.

== Size ==
The average length of the G. aestuaria as an unsexed male is about ten centimeters.

== Habitat ==
The Gilchristella aestuaria can be found in a marine environment and in freshwater. The habitat is located in subtropical climates. This species is primarily found in estuaries, lagoons, lakes, and rivers. It is considered an extremely important fish in estuaries of South Africa . This small sardine-like fish lives in large shoals and provides an important link in the food chain as a food source to larger fish and water birds. This fish does not survive in an aquarium, presumably dying from capture myopathy or stress.

== Distribution ==
The Gilchristella aestuaria is distributed throughout the following areas:

- Africa
- Lake Piti
- Mozambique
- Southern African coast
- Saldanha Bay
- Orange River
- Namibia
- South Africa
- Eastern Cape Province
- KwaZulu-Natal
- Northern Cape Province
