= Potamothrissa =

Scientific classification
- Domain: Eukaryota
- Kingdom: Animalia
- Phylum: Chordata
- Class: Actinopterygii
- Order: Clupeiformes
- Family: Dorosomatidae
- Genus: Potamothrissa; Regan, 1917

Type species
- Pellonula obtusirostris Boulenger, 1909

Genus of fishes

Potamothrissa is a genus of fish belonging to the family Dorosomatidae, which also includes the gizzard shads and sardinellas. These fishes are found in Africa. It currently contains three species.

== Species ==
- Potamothrissa acutirostris (Boulenger, 1899) (Sharpnosed sawtooth pellonuline)
- Potamothrissa obtusirostris (Boulenger, 1909) (Bluntnosed sawtooth pellonuline)
- Potamothrissa whiteheadi Poll, 1974 (Whitehead's sawtooth pellonuline)
