= Poecilothrissa =

Scientific classification
- Kingdom: Animalia
- Phylum: Chordata
- Class: Actinopterygii
- Order: Clupeiformes
- Family: Dorosomatidae
- Genus: Poecilothrissa; Regan, 1917
- Species: P. centralis

Binomial name
- Poecilothrissa centralis Poll, 1974

Species of fish

Poecilothrissa centralis, the Central Zaire pellonuline, is a very small fish of the Dorosomatidae family which is found only in Lake Tumba and the Ruki River as well as the Congo and Busira Rivers. It is the only member of the genus Poecilothrissa.
