= Laeviscutella =

Conservation status
- Least Concern (IUCN 3.1)

Scientific classification
- Kingdom: Animalia
- Phylum: Chordata
- Class: Actinopterygii
- Order: Clupeiformes
- Family: Dorosomatidae
- Genus: Laeviscutella (Poll, Whitehead & Hopson, 1965)
- Species: L. dekimpei

Binomial name
- Laeviscutella dekimpei (Poll, Whitehead & Hopson, 1965)

Species of fish

Laeviscutella dekimpei, the roundbelly pellonuline, is a small fish belonging to the family, Dorosomatidae, which inhabits rivers and brackish lagoons in Africa. It is the only member of its genus.
