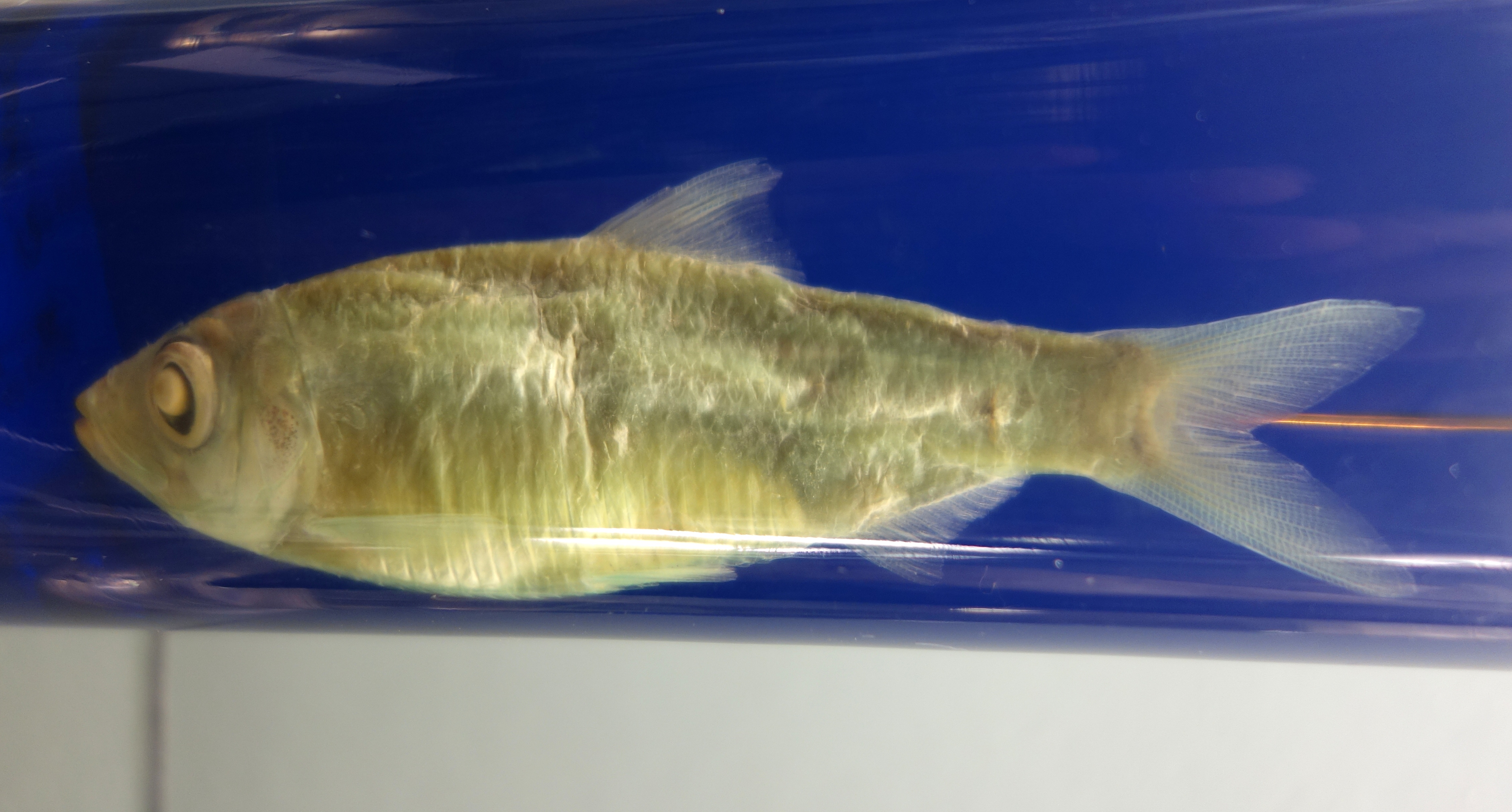
- Pellonula vorax

Scientific classification
- Kingdom: Animalia
- Phylum: Chordata
- Class: Actinopterygii
- Order: Clupeiformes
- Family: Dorosomatidae
- Genus: Pellonula; Günther, 1868

Type species
- Pellonula vorax Günther, 1868

= Pellonula =

Genus of fishes

Pellonula is a small genus of ray-finned fish belonging to the family Dorosomatidae, which includes the gizzard shads and sardinellas. There are currently two recognized species in this genus. The fishes in this genus are found in Africa.

== Species ==
- Pellonula leonensis Boulenger, 1916 (Small-toothed pellonula)
- Pellonula vorax Günther, 1868 (Big-toothed pellonula)
