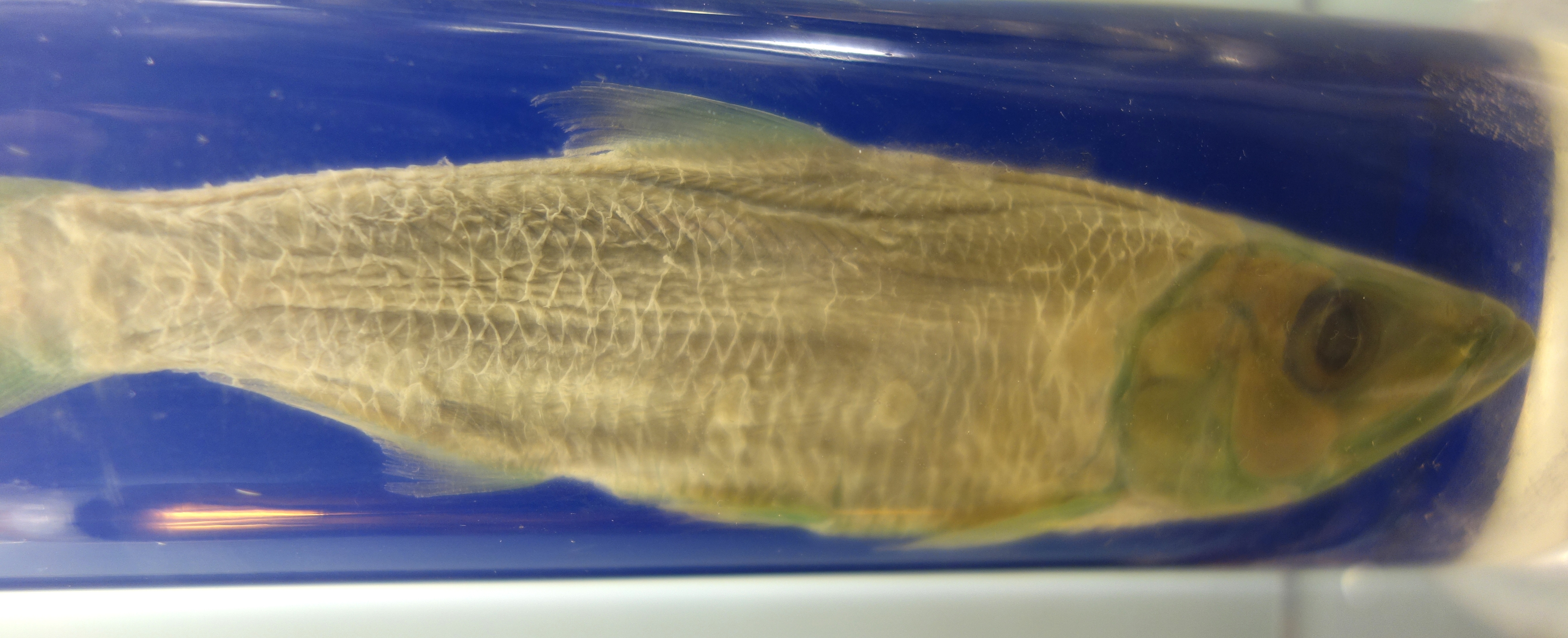
- Odaxothrissa losera

Scientific classification
- Kingdom: Animalia
- Phylum: Chordata
- Class: Actinopterygii
- Order: Clupeiformes
- Family: Dorosomatidae
- Genus: Odaxothrissa; Boulenger, 1899

Type species
- Odaxothrissa losera Boulenger, 1899

Synonyms
- Cynathrissa; Cynothrissa Regan, 1917

= Odaxothrissa =

Genus of fishes

Odaxothrissa, the fangtooth pellonulines, is a genus of fresh-water fish in the family Dorosomatidae. All the extant species in this genus are found in tropical Africa.

== Species ==
Odaxothrissa contains the following species:

- Odaxothrissa ansorgii Boulenger, 1910 (Ansorge fangtooth pellonuline)
- Odaxothrissa losera Boulenger, 1899 (Losera fangtooth pellonuline)
- Odaxothrissa mento (Regan, 1917) (Nigerian fangtooth pellonuline)
- Odaxothrissa vittata Regan 1917 (Regan's fangtooth pellonuline)
