= 2020 in paleoichthyology =

This list of fossil fishes described in 2020 is a list of new taxa of jawless vertebrates, placoderms, acanthodians, fossil cartilaginous fishes, bony fishes, and other fishes of every kind that were described during the year 2020, as well as other significant discoveries and events related to paleoichthyology that occurred in 2020.

== New taxa ==
=== Jawless vertebrates ===
Name	Novelty	Status	Authors	Age	Type locality	Country	Notes	Images
Clavulaspis	Nom. nov	Valid	Elliott, Lassiter & Geyer	Devonian (Givetian)	Yahatinda Formation	Canada (Alberta)	A member of the family Pteraspididae; a replacement name for Helaspis Elliott et al. (2000).	
Ecphymaspis	Gen. et comb. nov	Valid	Elliott, Lassiter & Geyer	Devonian (Eifelian)	Spring Mountain beds	United States (Idaho)	A member of the family Pteraspididae; a new genus for "Psephaspis" idahoensis Denison (1968).	
Parathelodus liaokuoensis	Sp. nov	Valid	Cui et al.	Devonian (Lochkovian)	Xishancun Xitun	China	A thelodont belonging to the family Coelolepidae. Announced in 2019; the final version of the article naming it was published in 2020.	
Parathelodus wangi	Sp. nov	Valid	Cui et al.	Devonian (Lochkovian)	Xishancun Xitun	China	A thelodont belonging to the family Coelolepidae. Announced in 2019; the final version of the article naming it was published in 2020.	
Parathelodus xitunensis	Sp. nov	Valid	Cui et al.	Devonian (Lochkovian)	Xitun	China	A thelodont belonging to the family Coelolepidae. Announced in 2019; the final version of the article naming it was published in 2020.	
Psarkosteus	Gen. et sp. nov	Valid	Dec	Devonian (Givetian)	Skały	Poland	A member of the family Psammosteidae. The type species is P. mediocris.	
Rumporostralis	Gen. et comb. et sp. nov	Valid	Shan et al.	Silurian (Telychian)	Xikeng Formation	China	A member of Galeaspida belonging to the group Eugaleaspiformes and the family Sinogaleaspidae. The type species is "Sinogaleaspis" xikengensis Pan & Wang (1980); genus also includes new species R. shipanensis.	
Scutellaspis	Gen. et sp. nov	Valid	Elliott, Lassiter & Geyer	Devonian (Eifelian)	Spring Mountain beds	United States (Idaho)	A member of the family Pteraspididae. Genus includes new species S. wilsoni.	

=== Placoderms ===
Name	Novelty	Status	Authors	Age	Type locality	Country	Notes	Images
Actinolepis zaikai	Sp. nov	Valid	Plax & Newman	Devonian (Emsian)	Lepel Beds	Belarus		
Bulongosteus	Gen. et sp. nov	Valid	Liu, Zong & Gong	Late Devonian	Zhulumute Formation	China	A member of the family Selenosteidae. Genus includes new species B. liui.	
Johannaspis	Gen. et comb. nov	Valid	Vaškaninová	Early Devonian	Prague Basin	Czech Republic	A homostiid arthrodire. Genus includes "Asterolepis" bohemicus Barrande (1872).	
Minjinia	Gen. et sp. nov	Valid	Brazeau et al.	Devonian (Pragian)		Mongolia	A placoderm closely related to the gnathostome crown group. Genus includes new species M. turgenensis.	
Stipatosteus	Gen. et sp. nov	Valid	Plax & Newman	Devonian (Emsian)	Lepel Beds	Belarus	A phlyctaeniid arthrodire. Genus includes new species S. svidunovitchi.	

=== Acanthodians ===
Name	Novelty	Status	Authors	Age	Type locality	Country	Notes	Images
Fallodentus	Gen. et sp. nov	In press	Newman, Den Blaauwen & Burrow	Devonian (Givetian)	Mey Flagstone Formation	United Kingdom	A cheiracanthid acanthodian. Genus includes new species F. davidsoni.	

=== Cartilaginous fishes ===
Name	Novelty	Status	Authors	Age	Type locality	Country	Notes	Images
Amamriabatis	Gen. et sp. nov	Valid	Adnet et al.	Eocene		Tunisia; Egypt?	A ray belonging to the family Mobulidae. The type species is A. heni.	
Asteracanthus dunaii	Sp. nov	Valid	Szabó & Főzy	Jurassic		Hungary		
Atlantitrygon	Gen. et comb. et sp. nov	Valid	Sambou et al.	Paleocene (Thanetian) and Eocene (Lutetian)	Matam	Niger; Senegal; Togo	A putative marine potamotrygonid. The type species is "Dasyatis" sudrei Cappetta (1972); genus also includes new species A. senegalensis.	
Canadodus	Gen. et sp. nov	Valid	Popov, Johns & Suntok	Late Oligocene	Sooke	Canada (British Columbia)	A member of the family Chimaeridae. Genus includes new species C. suntoki.	
Carcharhinus kasserinensis	Sp. nov	Valid	Adnet et al.	Eocene (Bartonian)		Tunisia; Jamaica?	A species of Carcharhinus.	
Coupatezia cristata	Sp. nov	Valid	Adnet et al.	Eocene		Egypt; Tunisia	A ray belonging to the superfamily Dasyatoidea.	
Cretasquatina	Gen. et sp. nov	Valid	Maisey, Ehret & Denton	Late Cretaceous (Campanian)	Mooreville Chalk; Navesink Formation?	United States (Alabama; New Jersey?)	A member of the family Squatinidae. The type species is C. americana.	
Eoplatyrhina	Gen. et comb. nov	Valid	Marramà et al.	Eocene	Monte Bolca	Italy	A member of the family Platyrhinidae. Genus includes "Platyrhina" bolcensis Heckel (1851).	
Eorhinobatos	Gen. et comb. nov	Valid	Marramà et al.	Eocene	Monte Bolca	Italy	A guitarfish; a new genus for "Rhinobatos" primaevus.	
Ferromirum	Gen. et sp. nov	Valid	Frey et al.	Devonian (Famennian)	Ibâouane	Morocco	A member of Symmoriiformes. The type species is F. oukherbouchi.	
Himantura souarfortuna	Sp. nov	Valid	Adnet et al.	Eocene (Bartonian)		Tunisia	A whiptail stingray, a species of Himantura.	
Lamarodus	Gen. et sp. nov	Valid	Ivanov in Ivanov et al.	Permian (Guadalupian)	Bell Canyon Formation	United States (Texas)	A member of Hybodontiformes belonging to the superfamily Hybodontoidea. Genus includes new species L. triangulus. Announced in 2018; the final version of the article naming it was published in 2020.	
Leptocharias tunisiensis	Sp. nov	Valid	Adnet et al.	Eocene		Tunisia; Egypt? Jordan?	A relative of the barbeled houndshark.	
Mecotrygon	Gen. et sp. nov	Valid	Adnet et al.	Eocene		Egypt; Tunisia	A whiptail stingray belonging to the subfamily Neotrygoninae. The type species is M. asperodentulus.	
Mennerotodus mackayi	Sp. nov	Valid	Cicimurri, Ebersole & Martin	Paleocene (Danian)	Clayton	United States (Alabama)	A sand shark	
Mennerotodus parmleyi	Sp. nov	Valid	Cicimurri, Ebersole & Martin	Eocene (Bartonian)	Clinchfield	United States (Georgia (U.S. state))	A sand shark	
Microtriftis	Gen. et sp. nov	Valid	Sambou et al.	Eocene (Ypresian to Lutetian)	Matam	Senegal	A dasyatoid of uncertain phylogenetic placement. Genus includes new species M. matami.	
Nanocetorhinus zeitlingeri	Sp. nov	Valid	Feichtinger, Pollerspöck & Harzhauser	Oligocene (Chattian)	Eferding	Austria	A member of Neoselachii of uncertain phylogenetic placement.	
Odontorhytis priemi	Sp. nov	Valid	Sambou et al.	Paleocene (Thanetian) and Eocene (Ypresian)	Matam	Mali; Morocco; Senegal; Tunisia	A member of Neoselachii of uncertain phylogenetic placement	
Ouledia lacuna	Sp. nov	Valid	Adnet et al.	Eocene (Bartonian)		Tunisia	A butterfly ray.	
Pachygymnura	Gen. et comb. nov	Valid	Adnet et al.	Eocene		Egypt; Tunisia	A butterfly ray. The type species is "Coupatezia" attiai Cook in Murray et al. (2010).	
Plesiozanobatus	Gen. et comb. nov	Valid	Marramà et al.	Eocene	Monte Bolca	Italy	A relative of panray. Genus includes "Torpedo" egertoni De Zigno (1876).	
Pristiophorus austriacus	Sp. nov	Valid	Reinecke et al.	Miocene (Aquitanian)	Ebelsberg	Austria	A species of Pristiophorus.	
Pristiophorus borealis	Sp. nov	Valid	Reinecke et al.	Oligocene (Chattian)	Sülstorf	Germany	A species of Pristiophorus.	
Pristiophorus tortonicus	Sp. nov	Valid	Reinecke et al.	Miocene (Tortonian)	Mica Clay	Germany	A species of Pristiophorus.	
Pristiophorus ungeri	Sp. nov	Valid	Reinecke et al.	Miocene (Burdigalian)	Neuhofen	Germany	A species of Pristiophorus.	
Pseudorhinobatos	Gen. et comb. nov	Valid	Marramà et al.	Eocene	Monte Bolca	Italy	A guitarfish; a new genus for "Rhinobatos" dezignii.	
Sculptospina	Gen. et sp. nov	Valid	Lebedev in Lebedev, Ivanov & Linkevich	Devonian (Famennian)		Russia (Lipetsk Oblast)	A member of Ctenacanthiformes of uncertain phylogenetic placement. The type species is S. makhlaevi.	
Sphyrna guinoti	Sp. nov	Valid	Adnet et al.	Eocene		Tunisia; Egypt?	A species of Sphyrna.	
Stegostoma tethysiensis	Sp. nov	Valid	Adnet et al.	Eocene		Tunisia; Egypt?	A relative of the zebra shark.	
Taklamakanolepis	Gen. et sp. nov		Andreev et al.	Early Silurian	Ymogantau	China	A member of Mongolepidida. The type species is T. asiaticus.	
Tielikewatielepis	Gen. et sp. nov		Andreev et al.	Early Silurian	Tataertag Ymogantau	China	A member of Mongolepidida. The type species is T. sinensis.	
Xiaohaizilepis	Gen. et sp. nov		Andreev et al.	Early Silurian	Tataertag Ymogantau	China	A member of Mongolepidida. The type species is X. liui.	
Yuanolepis	Gen. et sp. nov		Andreev et al.	Early Silurian	Ymogantau	China	A cartilaginous fish of uncertain phylogenetic placement. The type species is Y. bachunensis.	

=== Ray-finned fishes ===
Name	Novelty	Status	Authors	Age	Type locality	Country	Notes	Images
Agassizilia	Gen. et sp. nov	Valid	Cooper & Martill	Cenomanian	Kem Kem	Morocco	Possibly a member of the family Pycnodontidae. The type species is A. erfoudina.	
Altmuehlfuro	Gen. et sp. nov	Valid	Ebert	Late Jurassic	Solnhofen	Germany	A member of Halecomorphi belonging to the group Ophiopsiformes. Genus includes new species A. boomerang.	
Amakusaichthys	Gen. et sp. nov	Valid	Yabumoto, Hirose & Brito	Late Cretaceous (Santonian)	Hinoshima	Japan	A member of Ichthyodectiformes. Genus includes new species A. goshouraensis. Announced in 2018; the final version of the article naming it was published in 2020.	
Anomoeodus wolfi	Sp. nov	Valid	Capasso	Late Cretaceous (Cenomanian)	Del Rio	United States (Texas)	A member of the family Pycnodontidae.	
Anorevus	Gen. et sp. nov.	Valid	Bannikov & Zorzin	Eocene (Ypresian)	Monte Bolca	Italy	A member of Percomorpha of uncertain phylogenetic placement. The type species is A. lorenzonii.	
Ariopsis castilloensi	Sp. nov	In press	Aguilera & Rodriguez in Aguilera et al.	Late Oligocene to early Miocene	Castillo	Venezuela	A species of Ariopsis.	
Armigatus carrenoae	Sp. nov	Valid	Alvarado-Ortega, Than-Marchese & Melgarejo-Damián	Early Cretaceous (Albian)	Tlayúa	Mexico	A member of Clupeomorpha belonging to the group Ellimmichthyiformes and to the family Armigatidae.	
Bagre ornatus	Sp. nov	In press	Aguilera & Rodriguez in Aguilera et al.	Late Oligocene to early Miocene	Castillo	Venezuela	A species of Bagre.	
Baringochromis	Gen. et 3 sp. nov	Valid	Altner & Reichenbacher	Late Miocene		Kenya	A cichlid belonging to the subfamily Pseudocrenilabrinae. The type species is B. senutae; genus also includes B. sonyii and B. tallamae. Announced in 2020; the final version of the article naming it was published in 2021.	
Boreolates	Gen. et sp. nov	Valid	Weems	Eocene	Nanjemoy	United States (Virginia)	A member of the family Latidae. The type species is B. debernardi.	
Brachyplatystoma elbakyani	Sp. nov	In press	Agnolin & Bogan	Late Miocene		Argentina	A species of Brachyplatystoma	
Burguklia minichorum	Sp. nov	Valid	Bakaev & Kogan	Permian (Wordian–Capitanian)		Russia	An early ray-finned fish. Announced in 2019; the final version of the article naming it was published in 2020.	
Caucombrus	Gen. et sp. nov	Valid	Bannikov	Early Oligocene		Abkhazia; Russia	A member of the family Scombridae. Genus includes new species C. histiopterygius.	
Chaychanus	Gen. et sp. nov	Valid	Cantalice Severiano, Alvarado Ortega & Bellwood	Paleocene		Mexico	A member of the family Pomacentridae. Genus includes new species C. gonzalezorum. Announced in 2019; the final version of the article naming it was published in 2020.	
Cheirolepis aleshkai	Sp. nov	Valid	Plax	Devonian (Eifelian)		Belarus	An early ray-finned fish.	
Clupea hanishinaensis	Nom. nov	Valid	Yabumoto & Nazarkin	Miocene	Bessho	Japan	A species of Clupea; a replacement name for Clupea macrocephala Yabumoto & Nazarkin (2018).	
Cyclothone duhoensis	Sp. nov	Valid	Nam & Nazarkin	Miocene	Duho	South Korea	A species of Cyclothone. Announced in 2020; the final version of the article naming it was published in 2021.	
Ellimma longipectoralis	Sp. nov	Valid	Polck et al.	Early Cretaceous (Aptian)	Barra Velha Formation	Brazil	A member of Clupeomorpha belonging to the group Ellimmichthyiformes and to the family Paraclupeidae. Announced in 2019; the final version of the article naming it was published in 2020.	
Ellimmichthys spinosus	Sp. nov	In press	De Figueiredo & Gallo	Early Cretaceous	Recôncavo Basin	Brazil	A member of Clupeomorpha belonging to the group Ellimmichthyiformes.	
Elongofuro	Gen. et sp. nov	Valid	Ebert	Late Jurassic		Germany	A member of Halecomorphi belonging to the group Ophiopsiformes. Genus includes new species E. woelflei.	
Engdahlichthys	Gen. et sp. nov	Valid	Murray et al.	Paleocene	Fort Union	United States (Montana)	A sturgeon. Genus includes new species E. milviaegis.	
Epaelops	Gen. et sp. nov	In press	Alves, Alvarado Ortega & Brito	Early Cretaceous (Albian)	Tlayúa	Mexico	A member of Elopiformes. Genus includes new species E. martinezi. Announced in 2019; the final version of the article naming it is scheduled to be published in 2020.	
Feroxichthys	Gen. et sp. nov	Valid	Xu	Middle Triassic (Anisian)	Guanling	China	A member of the family Colobodontidae. The type species is F. yunnanensis.	
Globanomoeodus	Gen. et sp. nov	Valid	Capasso	Late Cretaceous (Cenomanian)	Del Rio	United States (Texas)	A member of the family Pycnodontidae. The type species is G. dentespassim.	
Gregoriopycnodus	Gen. et comb. nov	Valid	Taverne, Capasso & Del Re	Early Cretaceous (Albian)		Italy	A member of the family Pycnodontidae. The type species is "Palaeobalistum" bassanii d'Erasmo (1914).	
Hadromos	Gen. et sp. nov	Valid	Murray	Early Cenozoic (possibly Eocene)	Sangkarewang	Indonesia	A member of Cyprinoidea. Genus includes new species H. sandersae.	
Hastichthys totonacus	Sp. nov	In press	Alvarado-Ortega & Díaz-Cruz	Late Cretaceous (Turonian)	Agua Nueva	Mexico	A member of Aulopiformes belonging to the family Dercetidae.	
Heckelichthys preopercularis	Sp. nov	In press	Baños Rodríguez et al.	Cretaceous (Albian–Cenomanian)	El Doctor	Mexico	A member of Ichthyodectiformes	
Hiascoactinus	Gen. et sp. nov	In press	Kim et al.	Late Triassic	Amisan	South Korea	A member of Redfieldiiformes. Genus includes new species H. boryeongensis. Announced in 2019; the final version of the article naming it is scheduled to be published in 2020.	
Holzmadenfuro	Gen. et sp. nov	Valid	Ebert, Thies & Hauff	Early Jurassic (Toarcian)	Posidonia	Germany	A member of Halecomorphi. Genus includes new species H. rebmanni.	
Hypsocormus posterodorsalis	Sp. nov	Valid	Maxwell et al.	Late Jurassic (Kimmeridgian)	Nusplingen	Germany		H. posterodorsalis (bottom)
Kradimus	Gen. et sp. nov	Valid	Veysey, Brito & Martill	Late Cretaceous (Turonian)	Akrabou Formation	Morocco	A member of Crossognathiformes. Genus includes new species K. asflaensis. Announced in 2019; the final version of the article naming it was published in 2020.	
Lavinia stuwilliamsi	Sp. nov	Valid	McClellan & Smith	Late Miocene	Salt Lake Formation	United States (Utah)	A species of Lavinia.	
Lebrunichthys	Gen. et sp. nov	Valid	Taverne & Capasso	Late Cretaceous (Cenomanian)		Lebanon	A member of Crossognathiformes belonging to the family Pachyrhizodontidae. The type species is L. nammourensis.	
Lindoeichthys	Gen. et sp. nov.	Valid	Murray et al.	Late Cretaceous (Maastrichtian)	Scollard Formation	Canada (Alberta)	A member of Percopsiformes. Genus includes new species L. albertensis. Announced in 2019; the final version of the article naming it was published in 2020.	
Louwoichthys	Gen. et sp. nov	Valid	Xu	Middle Triassic (Anisian)		China	A member of the stem group of Neopterygii. Genus includes new species L. pusillus.	
Luganoia fortuna	Sp. nov	Valid	Xu	Middle Triassic (Ladinian)	Falang	China		
Monosmilus	Gen. et sp. nov		Capobianco et al.	Eocene (Lutetian)	Domanda	Pakistan	A stem-engraulid. The type species is M. chureloides.	
Neilpeartia	Gen. et sp. nov	Valid	Carnevale et al.	Eocene (Ypresian)	Monte Bolca	Italy	A frogfish. Genus includes new species N. ceratoi.	
Neomesturus	Gen. et sp. nov	In press	Cooper & Martill	Turonian	Akrabou	Morocco	A member of Pycnodontiformes. Genus includes new species N. asflaensis.	
Neoproscinetes africanus	Sp. nov	Valid	Cooper & Martill	Cenomanian	Kem Kem	Morocco	A member of the family Pycnodontidae	
Njoerdichthys	Gen. et sp. nov	In press	Cawley et al.	Late Cretaceous (Turonian)	Hesseltal	Germany	A member of the family Pycnodontidae. The type species is N. dyckerhoffi.	
Nunaneichthys	Gen. et sp. nov	In press	Hernández-Guerrero et al.	Cretaceous (Albian-Cenomanian)		Mexico	A bonefish belonging to the subfamily Pterothrissinae. Genus includes new species N. mexicanus.	
Ohmdenfuro	Gen. et sp. nov	Valid	Ebert, Thies & Hauff	Early Jurassic (Toarcian)	Posidonia	Germany	A member of Halecomorphi. Genus includes new species O. bodmani.	
Paranursallia cavini	Sp. nov	In press	Cooper & Martill	Turonian	Akrabou	Morocco	A member of Pycnodontiformes.	
Pauciuncus	Gen. et comb. nov	Valid	Murray	Early Cenozoic (possibly Eocene)	Sangkarewang	Indonesia	A member of Cyprinoidea. Genus includes "Puntius" bussyi.	
Polcynichthys	Gen. et sp. nov	In press	London & Shimada	Late Cretaceous (Cenomanian)	Tarrant	United States (Texas)	A member of the family Pachyrhizodontidae. Genus includes new species P. lloydhilli.	
Rachycentron stremphaencus	Sp. nov	Valid	Godfrey & Carnevale	Miocene (Tortonian)	St. Marys	United States (Maryland)	A relative of the cobia.	
Rebekkachromis valyricus	Sp. nov	Valid	Kevrekidis & Reichenbacher in Kevrekidis et al.	Miocene	Ngorora	Kenya	A cichlid belonging to the tribe Oreochromini.	
Rebekkachromis vancouveringae	Sp. nov	Valid	Kevrekidis & Reichenbacher in Kevrekidis et al.	Miocene	Ngorora	Kenya	A cichlid belonging to the tribe Oreochromini.	
Rupelia	Gen. et comb. nov	Valid	Baykina & Kovalchuk in Kovalchuk et al.	Oligocene (Rupelian)		Russia	A member of family Clupeidae. Genus includes R. rata (Daniltshenko, 1959).	
Salwaichthys	Gen. et sp. nov	Valid	Bannikov	Early Oligocene		Abkhazia; Poland; Russia (Adygea)	A member of Perciformes belonging to the new family Salwaichthyidae. Genus includes new species S. paratethyensis.	
Sanctusichthys	Gen. et sp. nov	Valid	López-Arbarello, Maxwell & Schweigert	Late Jurassic (Kimmeridgian)	Nusplingen Limestone	Germany	A member of Halecomorphi. Genus includes new species S. rieteri.	
Sangkarewangia	Gen. et sp. nov	Valid	Murray	Early Cenozoic (possibly Eocene)	Sangkarewang	Indonesia	A member of Cyprinoidea. Genus includes new species S. sumatranus.	
Scleropages sanshuiensis	Sp. nov	Valid	Zhang	Early Eocene	Huachong	China	A species of Scleropages. Announced in 2019; the final version of the article naming it was published in 2020.	
Scombroclupea javieri	Sp. nov	In press	Than Marchese et al.	Late Cretaceous (Cenomanian)	Cintalapa	Mexico	A member of Clupeomorpha of uncertain phylogenetic placement	
Siniperca ikikoku	Sp. nov	Valid	Yabumoto	Miocene		Japan	A species of Siniperca.	
Simocormus	Gen. et sp. nov	Valid	Maxwell et al.	Late Jurassic (Kimmeridgian–Tithonian)		Germany	A member of the family Pachycormidae. The type species is S. macrolepidotus.	
Stanhopeichthys	Gen. et sp. nov	Valid	Taverne & Capasso	Late Cretaceous (Cenomanian)		Lebanon	A member of Crossognathiformes belonging to the family Pachyrhizodontidae. The type species is S. libanicus.	
Stefanichthys	Gen. et sp. nov.	Valid	Bannikov & Zorzin	Eocene (Ypresian)	Monte Bolca	Italy	A member of Percoidei of uncertain phylogenetic placement. The type species is S. mariannae.	
Vachalia	Gen. et sp. nov	Valid	Přikryl & Carnevale	Early Oligocene		Czech Republic	A member of the family Platytroctidae. Genus includes new species V. moraviensis.	
Vegrandichthys	Gen. et sp. nov	Valid	Díaz-Cruz, Alvarado-Ortega & Giles	Late Cretaceous (Cenomanian)	Cintalapa	Mexico	A member of Aulopiformes belonging to the family Enchodontidae. The type species is V. coitecus.	
Warilochromis	Gen. et sp. nov	Valid	Altner, Ruthensteiner & Reichenbacher	Late Miocene	Ngorora	Kenya	A cichlid belonging to the subfamily Pseudocrenilabrinae. The type species is W. unicuspidatus.	

==== Otolith taxa ====
Name	Novelty	Status	Authors	Age	Type locality	Country	Notes	Images
Ampheristus americanus	Sp. nov	Valid	Schwarzhans & Stringer	Late Cretaceous (Maastrichtian) and Paleocene (Danian)	Clayton; Kemp Clay	United States (Arkansas; Texas)	A cusk-eel.	
Anguilla? chickasawae	Sp. nov	Valid	Schwarzhans & Stringer in Stringer et al.	Late Cretaceous (Maastrichtian) and Paleocene (Danian)	Clayton; Ripley	United States (Arkansas; Mississippi)	A member or a relative of the family Anguillidae	
Apateodus crenellatus	Sp. nov	Valid	Schwarzhans & Stringer in Stringer et al.	Late Cretaceous (Maastrichtian)	Owl Creek Ripley	United States (Mississippi)		
Benthophilus aprutinus	Sp. nov	Valid	Schwarzhans, Agiadi & Carnevale	Miocene (Messinian)		Italy	A tadpole goby.	
Benthophilus labronicus	Sp. nov	Valid	Schwarzhans, Agiadi & Carnevale	Miocene (Messinian)		Italy	A tadpole goby.	
Buenia pisiformis	Sp. nov	Valid	Schwarzhans, Agiadi & Carnevale	Miocene (Tortonian and Messinian)		Greece	A species of Buenia.	
Caspiosoma lini	Sp. nov	Valid	Schwarzhans, Agiadi & Carnevale	Miocene (Messinian)		Italy; Romania	A species of Caspiosoma.	
Caspiosoma paulisulcata	Sp. nov	Valid	Schwarzhans, Agiadi & Carnevale	Miocene (Messinian)		Italy	A species of Caspiosoma.	
Choctawichthys	Gen. et comb. nov	Valid	Schwarzhans & Stringer in Stringer et al.	Late Cretaceous (Maastrichtian)	Ripley	United States (Mississippi)	A member of Paracanthopterygii of uncertain phylogenetic placement. The type species is "genus Perciformorum" cepoloides Nolf & Dockery (1990).	
Chromogobius? primigenius	Sp. nov	Valid	Schwarzhans, Brzobohatý & Radwańska	Miocene		Czech Republic Poland	Possibly a species of Chromogobius.	
Congrophichthus	Gen. et sp. nov	Valid	Schwarzhans & Stringer	Late Cretaceous (late Campanian and Maastrichtian) and Paleocene (Danian)	Clayton; Coffee Sand; Kemp Clay	United States (Alabama; Arkansas; Mississippi; Texas)	A member of the family Congridae. The type species is C. transterminus.	
Cowetaichthys carnevalei	Sp. nov	Valid	Schwarzhans & Stringer in Stringer et al.	Late Cretaceous (Maastrichtian)	Ripley	United States (Mississippi)	A beardfish	
Dakotaichthys	Gen. et sp. nov	Valid	Schwarzhans & Stringer	Late Cretaceous (Maastrichtian)	Fox Hills; Kemp Clay	United States (North Dakota; Texas)	Possibly a member of the family Gadidae. The type species is D. hogansoni.	
Eleotris omuamuaensis	Sp. nov	Valid	Schwarzhans, Agiadi & Carnevale	Miocene (Tortonian)		Italy	A species of Eleotris.	
Eleotris tyrrhenicus	Sp. nov	Valid	Schwarzhans, Agiadi & Carnevale	Miocene (Tortonian)		Italy	A species of Eleotris.	
Elopothrissus carsonsloani	Sp. nov	Valid	Schwarzhans & Stringer	Paleocene (Danian)	Clayton	United States (Arkansas)	A relative of the Japanese gissu.	
Enigmacottus	Gen. et sp. nov	Valid	Schwarzhans, Agiadi & Carnevale	Miocene (Messinian)		Italy	Possibly a member of the family Psychrolutidae. The type species is E. socialis.	
Eutawichthys choctawae	Sp. nov	Valid	Schwarzhans & Stringer in Stringer et al.	Late Cretaceous (Maastrichtian)	Kemp Clay; Ripley	United States (Mississippi; Texas)	Probably a member of Beryciformes	
Gobius peloponnesus	Sp. nov	Valid	Schwarzhans, Agiadi & Carnevale	Pliocene (Zanclean)		Greece	A species of Gobius.	
Gobius supraspectabilis	Sp. nov	Valid	Schwarzhans, Brzobohatý & Radwańska	Miocene		Austria Czech Republic; Slovakia; Ukraine	A species of Gobius.	
Hesperichthys gironeae	Sp. nov	Valid	Schwarzhans, Agiadi & Carnevale	Miocene (Tortonian and Messinian)		Italy	A goby.	
Hesperichthys iugosus	Sp. nov	Valid	Schwarzhans, Brzobohatý & Radwańska	Miocene		Moldova Slovakia	A goby. Originally described as a species of Hesperichthys, but subsequently transferred to the genus Sarmatigobius.	
Hoeseichthys	Gen. et comb. nov	Valid	Schwarzhans, Brzobohatý & Radwańska	Miocene and Pliocene		Czech Republic Germany; India; Italy; Morocco	A goby. The type species is "Gobius" laevis Weiler (1942); genus also includes "Otolithus (Gobius)" praeclarus Procházka (1893), as well as "Gobiida" bicornuta Lin, Girone & Wolf (2015) and "Gobiida" brioche Lin, Girone & Wolf (2015).	
Hoplopteryx langfordi	Sp. nov	Valid	Schwarzhans & Stringer in Stringer et al.	Late Cretaceous (Maastrichtian)	Ripley	United States (Mississippi)		
Knipowitschia etrusca	Sp. nov	Valid	Schwarzhans, Agiadi & Carnevale	Miocene (Messinian)		Italy	A species of Knipowitschia.	
Knipowitschia polonica	Sp. nov	Valid	Schwarzhans, Brzobohatý & Radwańska	Miocene		Czech Republic Poland; Ukraine	A species of Knipowitschia.	
Kokenichthys navis	Sp. nov	Valid	Schwarzhans & Stringer in Stringer et al.	Late Cretaceous (Maastrichtian)	Owl Creek Ripley	United States (Mississippi)	A member of Osteoglossiformes of uncertain phylogenetic placement	
Lesueurigobius stazzanensis	Sp. nov	Valid	Schwarzhans, Agiadi & Carnevale	Miocene (Tortonian)		Italy	A species of Lesueurigobius.	
Megalops? nolfi	Sp. nov	Valid	Schwarzhans & Stringer in Stringer et al.	Late Cretaceous (Maastrichtian)	Ripley	United States (Mississippi)	Probably member of the family Megalopidae	
Muraenanguilla unionensis	Sp. nov	Valid	Schwarzhans & Stringer in Stringer et al.	Late Cretaceous (Maastrichtian)	Owl Creek Ripley	United States (Mississippi)	An eel of uncertain phylogenetic placement	
Odondebuenia agiadiae	Sp. nov	Valid	Schwarzhans, Brzobohatý & Radwańska	Miocene		Poland Slovakia; Ukraine	A relative of the coralline goby.	
Osmeroides mississippiensis	Sp. nov	Valid	Schwarzhans & Stringer in Stringer et al.	Late Cretaceous (Maastrichtian)	Owl Creek Ripley	United States (Mississippi)		
Ossulcus	Gen. et sp. nov	Valid	Schwarzhans & Stringer in Stringer et al.	Late Cretaceous (Maastrichtian)	Ripley	United States (Mississippi)	Probably a member of Beryciformes. The type species is O. labiatus.	
Otolithopsis cumatilis	Sp. nov	Valid	Schwarzhans & Stringer in Stringer et al.	Late Cretaceous (Maastrichtian)	Ripley	United States (Mississippi)	An otolith of a fish of uncertain phylogenetic placement.	
Palaeogadus weltoni	Sp. nov	Valid	Schwarzhans & Stringer	Late Cretaceous (Maastrichtian)	Kemp Clay	United States (Texas)		
Palealbula korchinskyi	Sp. nov	Valid	Schwarzhans & Mironenko	Late Jurassic		Russia	Possibly a stem-albuliform	
Palealbula moscoviensis	Sp. nov	Valid	Schwarzhans & Mironenko	Late Jurassic		Russia	Possibly a stem-albuliform.	
Proterorhinus cretensis	Sp. nov	Valid	Schwarzhans, Agiadi & Carnevale	Pliocene (Zanclean)		Greece	A species of Proterorhinus.	
Pythonichthys arkansasensis	Sp. nov	Valid	Schwarzhans & Stringer	Late Cretaceous (Maastrichtian) and Paleocene (Danian)	Clayton; Kemp Clay	United States (Arkansas; Texas)	A species of Pythonichthys.	
Rhynchoconger brettwoodwardi	Sp. nov	Valid	Schwarzhans & Stringer	Late Cretaceous (Maastrichtian)	Kemp Clay	United States (Texas)	A species of Rhynchoconger.	
Thorogobius petilus	Sp. nov	Valid	Schwarzhans, Agiadi & Carnevale	Miocene (Messinian)		Italy	A species of Thorogobius.	
Thrax	Gen. et sp. nov	Valid	Schwarzhans & Stringer in Stringer et al.	Late Cretaceous (Maastrichtian)	Ripley	United States (Mississippi)	A member of Aulopiformes belonging to the family Ichthyotringidae. The type species is T. acutus.	
Tippaha	Gen. et sp. et comb. nov	Valid	Schwarzhans & Stringer in Stringer et al.	Late Cretaceous (Maastrichtian)	Owl Creek Ripley	United States (Mississippi)	A member of Holocentriformes of uncertain phylogenetic placement. The type species is T. mythica; genus also includes "genus Ophidiidarum" cavatus Nolf & Stringer (1996).	
Vanderhorstia prochazkai	Sp. nov	Valid	Schwarzhans, Brzobohatý & Radwańska	Miocene		Czech Republic Slovakia; Ukraine	A species of Vanderhorstia.	
Zosterisessor exsul	Sp. nov	Valid	Schwarzhans, Agiadi & Carnevale	Miocene (Messinian)		Italy; Romania	A relative of the grass goby.	

=== Lobe-finned fishes ===
Name	Novelty	Status	Authors	Age	Type locality	Country	Notes	Images
Ferganoceratodus annekempae	Sp. nov	Valid	Cavin, Deesri & Chanthasit	Late Jurassic	Phu Kradung	Thailand	A lungfish.	
Megalichthys mullisoni	Sp. nov	Valid	Downs & Daeschler	Devonian (Famennian)	Catskill	United States (Pennsylvania)		
Metaceratodus baibianorum	Sp. nov	Valid	Panzeri et al.	Late Cretaceous	La Colonia	Argentina	A lungfish.	
Neoceratodus potkooroki	Sp. nov	Valid	Kemp & Berrell	Cretaceous		Australia	A lungfish.	
Ptychoceratodus oldhami	Sp. nov	Valid	Bhat & Ray	Late Triassic (Carnian)	Tiki	India	A lungfish. Announced in 2018; the final version of the article naming it was published in 2020.	
Rossichthys	Gen. et sp. nov	Valid	Johanson et al.	Carboniferous (Tournaisian)	Ballagan Formation	United Kingdom	A member of Rhizodontida. The type species is R. clackae.	

== Research ==
- A study on the morphology of the osteostracans, evaluating different methods used to determine the morphological variation within this group and its evolution, is published by Ferrón et al. (2020).
- A study on the morphological diversity of osteostracan headshields, aiming to determine the relationship between their morphological diversity and hydrodynamic performance and its implications for the knowledge of the ecological diversity of the osteostracans, is published by Ferrón et al. (2020).
- A study aiming to test the alternative hypotheses of placoderm jaw bone homologies, and evaluating their implications for the knowledge of evolution of jaw bones in early jawed vertebrates, is published by King & Rücklin (2020).
- A study on the fossil dentitions of acanthothoracids is published by Vaškaninová et al. (2020), who report that the teeth of acanthothoracids differed fundamentally from those of arthrodires, and argue that the characteristic traits of acanthothoracid dentition might be ancestral for all jawed vertebrates.
- Redescription of the anatomy of Walterilepis speciosa, based on data from new fossil material, and a study on the phylogenetic relationships of this species is published online by Lukševičs (2020).
- Description of the neurocranial anatomy of Ellopetalichthys scheii is published by Castiello et al. (2020).
- A study aiming to determine whether Titanichthys was a suspension feeder, focusing on mechanical properties of its jaw, is published by Coatham et al. (2020).
- The earliest fossilized vertebrate embryos reported so far, preserved with an adult specimen of Watsonosteus fletti from the Givetian Eday Flagstone Formation (Orcadian Basin; Scotland, United Kingdom), are described by Newman et al. (2020).
- Burrow, Newman & den Blaauwen (2020) describe external spiracular elements in Middle Devonian acanthodians from northern Scotland, differing from spiracles of all known extant and extinct fishes, and report the oldest record of elastic cartilage in the fossil record.
- A study examining the factors influencing the long-term variations of genus-level diversity of elasmobranchs and ray-finned fishes throughout their evolutionary history is published by Guinot & Cavin (2020).
- Carrillo-Briceño et al. (2020) describe a new elasmobranch assemblage from the Oligocene–Miocene boundary in the Dos Bocas Formation (Ecuador), and evaluate the implications of this assemblage for chronostratigraphic inferences and the knowledge of local paleoenvironment.
- Two large vertebrae of sharks belonging to the genus Ptychodus, providing new information on the life history and body size of members of the family Ptychodontidae, are described from the Santonian of Spain by Jambura & Kriwet (2020).
- A study on the evolution of body size in lamniform sharks, including the evolution of gigantism in the lineage of Otodus megalodon, is published by Shimada, Becker & Griffiths (2020).
- Taxonomic revision of the Oligocene and Miocene sand sharks is published by Hovestadt (2020).
- A study aiming to determine the linear body dimensions of Otodus megalodon at different life stages is published by Cooper et al. (2020).
- A study on the class structure of assemblages of specimens of Otodus megalodon in eight previously known formations and in a newly described Miocene locality from northeastern Spain is published by Herraiz et al. (2020), who interpret their findings as indicative of existence of five potential nurseries of these sharks ranging from the Langhian to the Zanclean.
- An isolated tooth of Cosmopolitodus hastalis from the Miocene of South Korea is described by Yun (2020).
- A study on the fossil record of the great white shark from the Pliocene of Peru and Chile is published by Villafaña et al. (2020), who interpret their findings as indicating that great white sharks used the Coquimbo locality in Chile as a nursery and Pisco (Peru) and Caldera (Chile) localities as feeding grounds during the Pliocene.
- A study on the anatomy and phylogenetic relationships of "Urolophus" crassicaudatus is published by Marramà et al. (2020), who transfer this species to the genus Arechia.
- Collareta et al. (2020) describe a fossil stinger a stingray from the Pliocene (Piacenzian) locality La Serra (Italy), twice as long as the longest caudal spines reported from any living stingray species of the Mediterranean Sea, and possibly representing the longest stingray stinger ever reported from both the fossil and the recent records.
- A study on the morphology of the marginal dentition of Lophosteus superbus is published by Chen et al. (2020), who reconstruct the dental ontogeny in this taxon, and evaluate its implications for the knowledge of the evolution of teeth of bony fishes.
- Redescription of the anatomy of Tanyrhinichthys mcallisteri is published by Stack et al. (2020).
- Fragmentary fossil material of Gyrosteus mirabilis is reported from the Toarcian of the Ahrensburg erratics assemblage (Schleswig-Holstein, Germany) by Hornung & Sachs (2020), expanding known geographic range of this species, and representing the first record of a chondrosteid species beyond its type area.
- Redescription of the skeletal anatomy of Yanosteus longidorsalis is published by Hilton, Grande & Jin (2020).
- Revision and a study on the phylogenetic relationships of members of the subfamily Pycnodontinae is published by Poyato-Ariza (2020).
- A study on the skeletal anatomy and phylogenetic relationships of Lombardina decorata is published by Taverne (2020).
- A study on the degree of preservation of the skin of an aspidorhynchid specimen from the Barremian Paja Formation (Colombia), representing the first instance of soft tissue preservation in vertebrates from the Early Cretaceous of northern South America, is published by Alfonso-Rojas & Cadena (2020).
- A study on the diversity and distribution of non-marine teleost fishes in the Western Interior of North America during the late Maastrichtian, based on fossils from the Hell Creek Formation, the Lance Formation and the Scollard Formation, is published online by Brinkman et al. (2020).
- Description of new fossil material of Abisaadichthys libanicus and Eusebichthys byblosi, providing new information on the skeletal anatomy of these taxa, is published by Taverne & Capasso (2020).
- Fossil material of Xiphactinus is described from the latest Maastrichtian Salamanca Formation (Chubut Province, Argentina) by De Pasqua, Agnolin & Bogan (2020), representing the first record of this genus from southern part of South America.
- A methodology for assessing locomotion energetics in extinct bony fishes is presented by Ferrón (2020), who interprets his findings as providing evidence of endothermy in Xiphactinus audax.
- Redescription and a study on the phylogenetic relationships of Laeliichthys ancestralis is published by Brito, Figueiredo & Leal (2020).
- A study on the skeletal anatomy of Pirskenius, aiming to resolve whether Pirskeniidae can be sustained as a separate family, is published by Reichenbacher et al. (2020).
- A study aiming to infer the genetic basis of the reduction of pelvic skeleton in a Miocene stickleback fish Gasterosteus doryssus is published by Stuart, Travis & Bell (2020).
- A fish larva sharing anatomical similarities with the so-called tholichthys larval stage of butterflyfishes is described from the Eocene (Bartonian) locality of Gornyi Luch (Krasnodar Krai, Russia) by Carnevale & Bannikov (2020).
- New fossil material of Mawsonia gigas, including one of the anatomically most informative specimens referable to the genus Mawsonia, is described from the Mesozoic Tacuarembó Formation (Uruguay) by Toriño et al. (2020).
- New fossil material of Axelrodichthys megadromos is described from several Campanian and Maastrichtian sites in southern France by Cavin et al. (2020), who present a reconstruction of the skull of this species, and study its phylogenetic relationships and ecology.
- Redescription of the anatomy of the skull of Durialepis edentatus is published by Mondéjar-Fernández, Friedman & Giles (2020).
- Description of new material of tristichopterids from the Devonian (Famennian) locality of Strud (Belgium), and a study on the phylogenetic relationships of tristichopterids, is published by Olive et al. (2020).
- Description of a new, 1.57-metre-long articulated specimen of Elpistostege watsoni from the Upper Devonian of Canada, and a study on the implications of this specimen for the knowledge of the early evolution of the vertebrate hand, is published by Cloutier et al. (2020).
- A study aiming to determine the potential significance of tides for the evolution of bony fish and early tetrapods from the Late Silurian to early Late Devonian is published by Byrne et al. (2020).
- Evidence of enhanced fish production during the extreme global warmth of the early Paleogene is presented by Britten & Sibert (2020).
- A study aiming to determine the impact of changes in the Earth system during the Eocene–Oligocene transition on pelagic fish production and biodiversity is published by Sibert et al. (2020).
