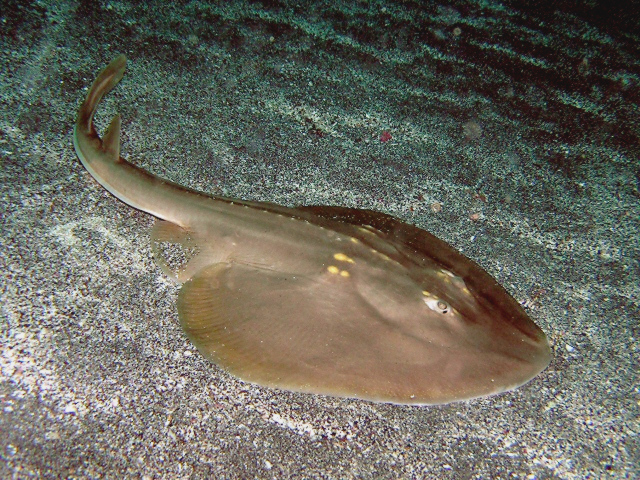

Conservation status
- Vulnerable (IUCN 3.1)

Scientific classification
- Kingdom: Animalia
- Phylum: Chordata
- Class: Chondrichthyes
- Subclass: Elasmobranchii
- Order: Torpediniformes
- Family: Platyrhinidae
- Genus: Platyrhina
- Species: P. tangi

Binomial name
- Platyrhina tangi Iwatsuki, J. Zhang & Nakaya, 2011

= Yellow-spotted fanray =

Species of cartilaginous fish

The yellow-spotted fanray (Platyrhina tangi) is a species of electric ray in the family Platyrhinidae. It lives in various countries in the northwestern Pacific Ocean and grows to a total length of about 45.52 centimetres (17.92 in) for males and 55.58 centimetres (21.88 in) for females.

== Taxonomy and etymology ==
The yellow-spotted fanray was described by Y. Iwatsuki, J. Zhang and K. Nakaya in 2011 as one of the three species in the genus Platyrhina. It is classified in the genus due to the patches of yellow on its central disc and thorns close to its orbit. Its specific name tangi is named after D.-S. Tang, a Chinese ichthyologist. Its holotype is located in Miyazaki, Japan. The species' closest relative is Platyrhina hyugaensis, the Hyuga fanray, due to the similarity of the two rays' thorn patterns.

== Description ==
The yellow-spotted fanray is primarily brown on its upper side, ranging from a darker to a grayer shade, and white on its underside, often containing patches of grey. Unlike the rest of its disk, the thorns at the front of its body are bordered with yellow. Its fins are a dull shade of yellow, with its pectoral and pelvic fins grey on the outside. The species typically grows to a total length (TL) of 45.52 centimetres (17.92 in) for males and a TL of 55.58 centimetres (21.88 in) for females. The largest unsexed male specimen was shown to have a TL of 68 centimetres (27 in), with 63.9 centimetres (25.2 in) being the TL of the largest female, although the species is believed to be able to grow to over 70 centimetres (28 in).

== Behavior and habitat ==
A benthic species, the yellow-spotted fanray lives in temperate waters in the pelagic and neritic zones, in areas where the sea floor is rocky or sandy. It lives in waters 5–80 metres (16–262 ft) deep, but usually ones shallower than 60 metres (200 ft). An ovoviviparous species, it can give birth during the fall or late summer, any time from August to November. Little else is known about the biology of the species. The species' diet was studied in detail in September 2012 by the Environmental Biology of Fishes, which found that the ray's most common food was shrimp and that it also ate mysids and fish. The study also discovered multiple other statistics about its eating. Males mature at 39.3 centimetres (15.5 in) TDL and can live to be a maximum of 5 years old. Females have a larger maturity size of 42.1 centimetres (16.6 in), and can live to be a maximum of 12 years old.

== Distribution ==
The yellow-spotted fanray lives in various countries in the northwestern Pacific Ocean area from Vietnam to Japan, specifically in China, Taiwan, northern Vietnam, southern Korea, and southern Japan.
