= Banjo shark =

Banjo shark may refer to:

- Thornback guitarfish (Platyrhinoidis triseriata) of the eastern Pacific
- Fiddler rays (Trygonorrhina spp.) of Australia
