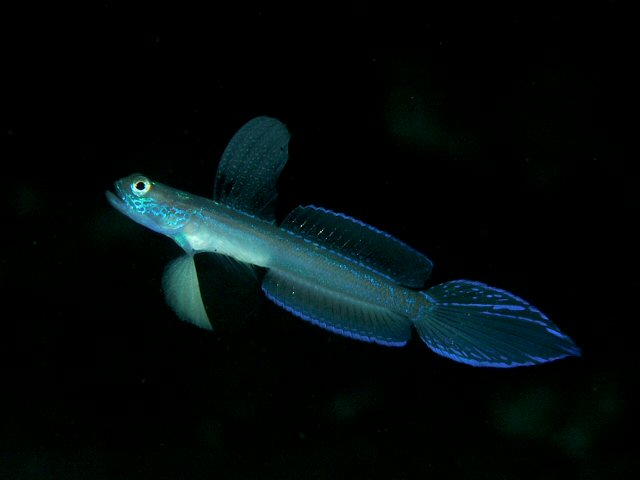

Conservation status
- Least Concern (IUCN 3.1)

Scientific classification
- Kingdom: Animalia
- Phylum: Chordata
- Class: Actinopterygii
- Order: Gobiiformes
- Family: Gobiidae
- Genus: Vanderhorstia
- Species: V. mertensi

Binomial name
- Vanderhorstia mertensi Klausewitz, 1974

= Vanderhorstia mertensi =

Species of fish

Vanderhorstia mertensi, Mertens' shrimp goby or the slender shrimp goby, is a species of ray-finned fish belonging to the family Gobiidae, the gobies. This species is native to the Indo-Pacific region, as well as having colonised the Eastern Mediterranean, probably through the Suez Canal.

== Taxonomy ==
Vanderhorstia mertensi was first formally described in 1974 by the German ichthyologist Wolfgang Klausewitz with its type locality given as Marsah Murach in the South Sinai Governorate of Egypt in the Gulf of Aqaba, in the northern Red Sea from a depth of 4 metres. The genus Vanderhorstia belongs to the true goby subfamily Gobiinae which is in the family Gobiidae.

== Etymology ==
Vanderhorstia mertensi belongs to the genus Vanderhorstia, the name of which is an eponym honouring the Dutch-born South African domiciled marine biologist Cornelius van der Horst. The specific name honours the German herpetologist Robert Mertens, the former director of the Naturmuseum Senckenberg in Frankfurt, from whom the author, Klausewitz, learnt about the biological and ecological view of modern systematics and taxonomy.

== Distribution and habitat ==
This species is native to the Red Sea, Japan, Papua New Guinea and the Great Barrier Reef. Male individuals can reach a length of 11 cm in total. In 2008, the first specimen was collected in the Mediterranean Sea, in the Gulf of Fethiye, southern Turkey, where it was found on sandy bottoms in the vicinity of beds of sea grass. It is now common in Israel, Turkey and Greece. According to the Mediterranean Science Commission, this species most likely entered the Mediterranean via the Suez Canal from the Red Sea.
