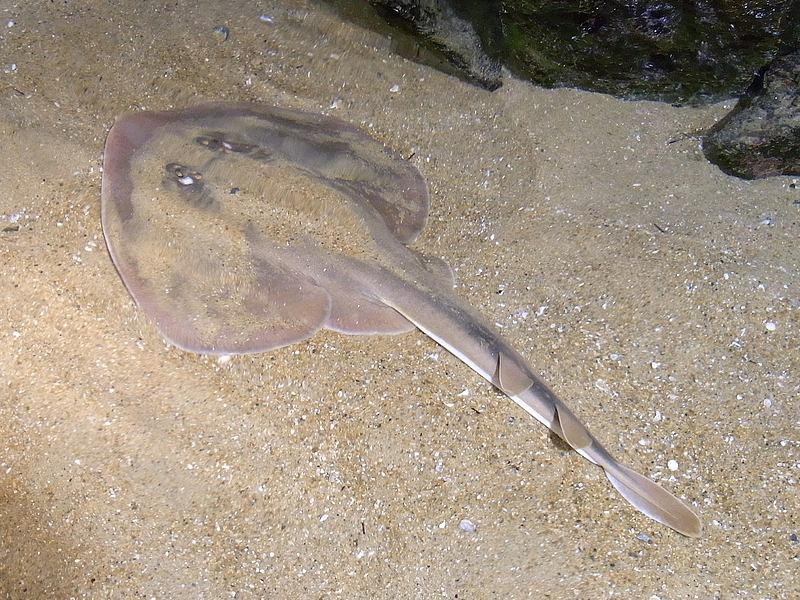
- Adult specimen

Conservation status
- Endangered (IUCN 3.1)

Scientific classification
- Kingdom: Animalia
- Phylum: Chordata
- Class: Chondrichthyes
- Subclass: Elasmobranchii
- Order: Torpediniformes
- Family: Platyrhinidae
- Genus: Platyrhina
- Species: P. sinensis

Binomial name
- Platyrhina sinensis (Bloch & J. G. Schneider, 1801)

Synonyms
- Platyrhina limboonkengi Tang, 1933; Rhina sinensis Bloch & J. G. Schneider, 1801

= Fanray =

Species of cartilaginous fish

The fanray (Platyrhina sinensis) is a species of ray in the family Platyrhinidae that lives in the western Pacific Ocean. It typically grows to a length of 30–50 centimetres (12–20 in) and a weight of 200–500 grams (7.1–17.6 oz), with a brown upperside and a white underside. It eats fish and crustaceans and has poor mobility. Males live to age five and females to age twelve, with both sexes maturing between two and five years. The species is found in China, Japan, Taiwan, Korea, Vietnam, and possibly Indonesia, in waters shallower than 100 metres (330 ft). It is probable that its population is declining due to being caught as a bycatch.

== Description ==
Fanrays grow to a maximum known length of 68 centimetres (27 in), but most specimens are 30–50 centimetres (12–20 in) long and weigh 200–500 grams (7.1–17.6 oz). Its body is flat throughout and shaped like a fan. The species' upperside is brown in color, its underside white, and the edge of its body yellow. It has wide nostrils, small eyes, a short snout, and a transversal through its mouth splitting it. It has multiple small teeth and thornlike scales on the upperside of its body.

== Behavior ==
The fanray eats small fish and crustaceans, specifically shrimp and mysids. To feed, it usually stays on the sea floor until there is an opportunity to capture food; it is a nocturnal species. It exhibits oviparity and mates in April or May. It swims slowly, due to the fact that its only way to move is by moving its tail forwards and backwards.

Males have a lifespan of five years, maturing between two and four years, while females have a lifespan of twelve years, maturing between three and five years. Both sexes mature when between 35 centimetres (14 in) and 40 centimetres (16 in) in total length, females at a slightly larger size than males. Specimens at Ariake Bay, the most common area the species occurs in, were surveyed from May 2002 to September 2006 for their age, growth, and sexual maturity. The survey revealed that females grow slower than males but achieve a greater total length as an adult. It also determined that in comparison to other related species, the ray grows and matures quickly, and lives for a short amount of time.

== Habitat and distribution ==
The fanray lives in the western Pacific Ocean in waters up to 100 metres (330 ft) deep, generally between 30 metres (98 ft) and 40 metres (130 ft) in coastal areas with a sandy sea floor. In particular, it is found off the coasts of China, Japan, Taiwan, Korea, Vietnam, and possibly Indonesia. The species is the most abundant elasmobranch species in Ariake Bay, Kyūshū, and is also common in the Yellow Sea and Bohai Sea.

The species is caught as bycatch in gillnets and trawls, sometimes being discarded but other times made use of. However, its population has not been negatively affected by these activities. Its flesh can be eaten fresh or after being dried. Its exact population or population trend is unknown, but its population in the East China Sea is known to be decreasing due to trawling activities. The fact that it lives in shallower waters makes it easy to be caught by fisheries. The species is the most common in several countries in the Northern part of its range. Currently, no conservation actions or restrictions are taking place on behalf of the species. Because of its probable population decline, the IUCN Red List lists it as an endangered species.
