= Tingitanius =

Tingitanius Temporal range: Turonian

Scientific classification
- Kingdom: Animalia
- Phylum: Chordata
- Class: Chondrichthyes
- Subclass: Elasmobranchii
- Order: Torpediniformes
- Family: Platyrhinidae
- Genus: †Tingitanius
- Species: †T. tenuimandibulus

Binomial name
- †Tingitanius tenuimandibulus Claeson et al., 2013

Tingitanius is an extinct genus of platyrhinid that lived during the Turonian stage of the Late Cretaceous epoch.

== Distribution ==
Tingitanius tenuimandibulus is known from fossils found in the Akrabou Formation of Morocco.
