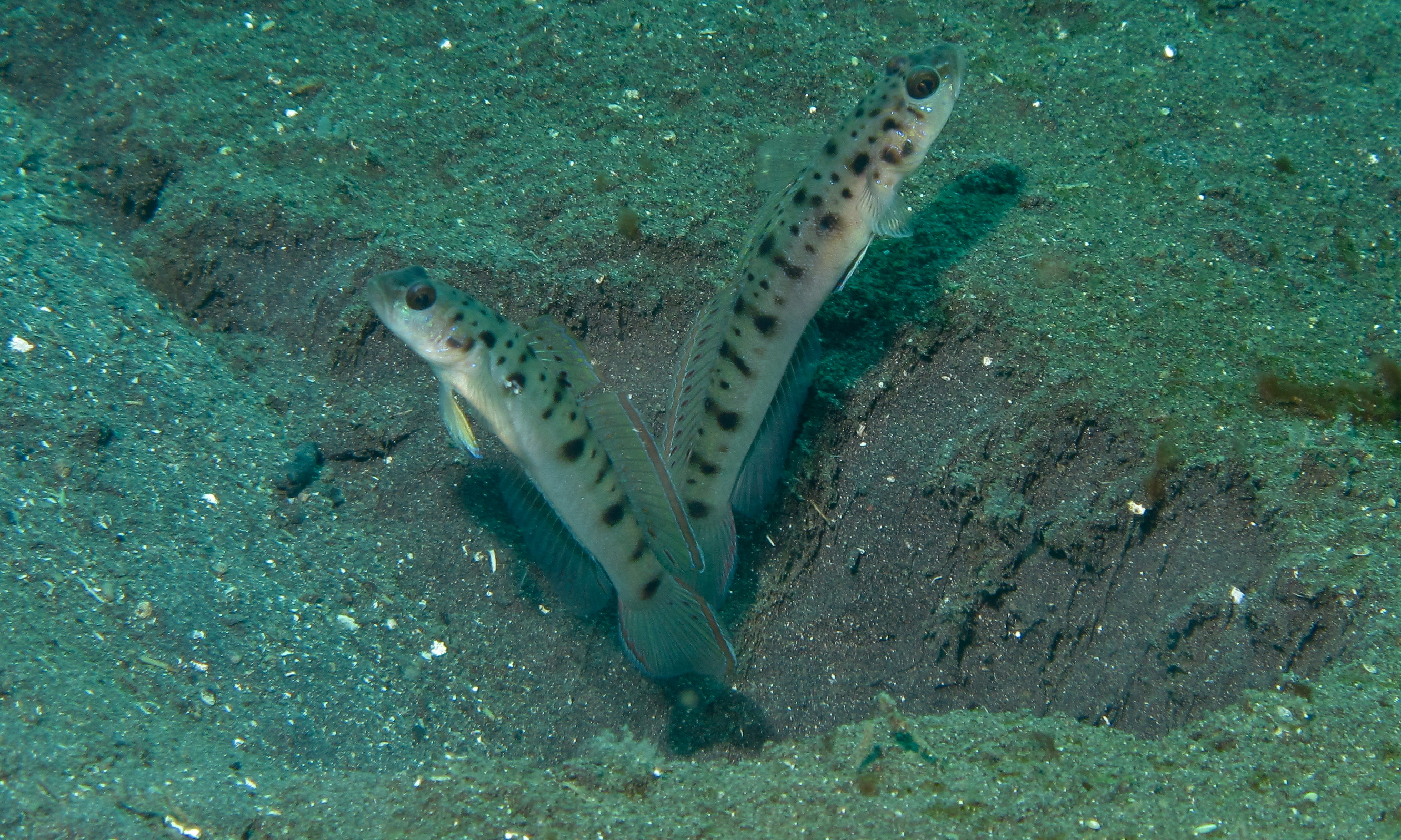

Conservation status
- Least Concern (IUCN 3.1)

Scientific classification
- Domain: Eukaryota
- Kingdom: Animalia
- Phylum: Chordata
- Class: Actinopterygii
- Order: Gobiiformes
- Family: Gobiidae
- Genus: Vanderhorstia
- Species: V. ambanoro

Binomial name
- Vanderhorstia ambanoro (Fourmanoir, 1957)

Synonyms
- Cryptocentrus ambanoro Fourmanoir, 1957; Cryptocentrus fasciaventris J. L. B. Smith, 1959; Vanderhorstia fasciaventris (J. L. B. Smith, 1959)

= Vanderhorstia ambanoro =

Species of fish

Vanderhorstia ambanoro, the Ambanoro prawn-goby or twin-spotted shrimp-goby, is a species of fish native to the Indian Ocean and the western Pacific Ocean, where it occurs in lagoons and coastal bays at depths of from 1 to 30 metres (3.3 to 98.4 ft). This species inhabits areas with mud or sand substrates, where it lives in association with Alpheus shrimps. This species can reach a length of 13 centimetres (5.1 in) TL. It can also be found in the aquarium trade.
