= Valentina Karatajūtė-Talimaa =

Lithuanian geologist and paleontologist

- Born: 7 December 1930; Ukmergė, Lithuania
- Died: 2 August 2022 (aged 91); Vilnius, Lithuania
- Education: Vilnius University
- Occupations: Geologist and paleontologist
- Children: 2

Valentina Karatajūtė-Talimaa (7 December 1930 – 2 August 2022) was a Lithuanian geologist and paleontologist.Best known for her contributions to the world of vertebrate fossils and vertebrate paleontology, she discovered over 100 new species throughout her career.

== Early life and education ==
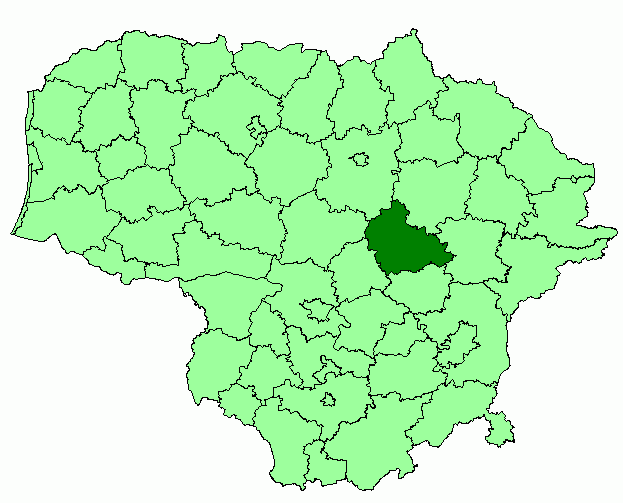
Ukmergė, Lithuania

Karatajūtė-Talimaa grew up in the small town of Ukmergė, Lithuania where she discovered her interest in paleontology at an early age. After finishing secondary school, although originally planning to study architecture with the intent to explore the world's beauty, her brother convinced her that studying geology would better fulfill this dream.Karatajūtė-Talimaa was further inspired to pursue geology by the work of Irina Yakovleva, a female paleontologist, and her husband, Vladimir. Karatajūtė-Talimaa began her journey in paleontology at Vilnius University in Lithuania from 1949 to 1954, where she studied under the mentorship of Juozas Dalinkevičius, known as the father of Lithuanian paleontology.

After graduating from Vilnius University, Karatajūtė-Talimaa joined a post-graduate study at the Moscow Paleontology Institute. Karatajūtė-Talimaa engaged in fieldwork under Dalinkevičius in the Soviet Union, later broadening her work to an international scale after the dissolution of the Soviet Union. She was a firm believer that the views of a paleontologist who only theorized without doing fieldwork were without merit.

In addition to her scientific accomplishments, Karatajūtė-Talimaa raised a son and a daughter, who both became concert-performing musicians. Valentina Karatajūtė-Talimaa died on 2 August 2022, aged 91 in Vilnius, Lithuania.

== Career ==
Having completed her education, Valentina Karatajūtė-Talimaa returned to Lithuania in 1957, gaining a junior research position at the Institute of Geology and Geography of the Lithuanian Academy of Sciences, later becoming senior researcher at the Institute of Geology of the USSR State Geological Committee. Here, she conducted expeditions, recovering remains of early Paleozoic ichthyofauna, discovering and analyzing their features. In 1967 she co-wrote and published a paper to the prestigious Linnean Society of London about Ludlow–Lower Devonian vertebrate fauna and correlation in East Europe. In 1976, she submitted this research to the monograph The Silurian and Devonian Thelodonts of the USSR and Spitsbergen.

Karatajūtė-Talimaa eventually had to defend her own thesis in geology and mineralogy (now Doctor Habilitatis in Natural Sciences). From 1976, Karatajūtė-Talimaa became involved with IGCP projects, travelling to countries including Germany, Canada, Britain, and Australia to discuss and collect geological materials. She developed her paleo-histological method for vertebrate skeletons (1988) so thoroughly that it led to her receiving many samples from both colleagues and young researchers. Eventually Karatajūtė-Talimaa wrote a reference text on the biostratigraphy of the Devonian and Silurian strata, utilizing the lodonts as index fossils.

Karatajūtė-Talimaa participated in many paleontological and geological expeditions over the course of her career. Her most notable discoveries include the Antiarchi, Thelodonts and Chondrichthyes, primarily found in northern Eurasia. Her most recent discovery was the description of a new Upper Ordovician–Lower Silurian vertebrate order, distinguished after discovering a new dentinous tissue lacking dentine canals. Throughout her time as a paleontologist, Karatajūtė-Talimaa identified over 100 new species and helped describe a higher taxon, and her expansive research is published in around 180 scientific articles. A few examples the taxa she described:

- Altholepis Karatajute-Talimaa, 1997
- Altholepis composita Karatajute-Talimaa, 1997

In 1997, Karatajute-Talimaa identified a new chondrichthyan species (type of cartilaginous fish) in the Lower Devonian of Ukraine. The species was initially named Kneria mashkovae to honor Professor Rudolf Kner and Dr. Tamara Mashkova, however, it was later found that the name Kneria was already assigned to different species of osteichthyan fish. Consequently, a new name, Knerialepis, was proposed in 2002. The fossil remains of Knerialepis mashkovae originate from various locations along the Dniestr River in Ukraine, including Dobrovliany, Ivane-Zolotoye, Zaleshchiki, Pechorna, and Bedrikovtsy.

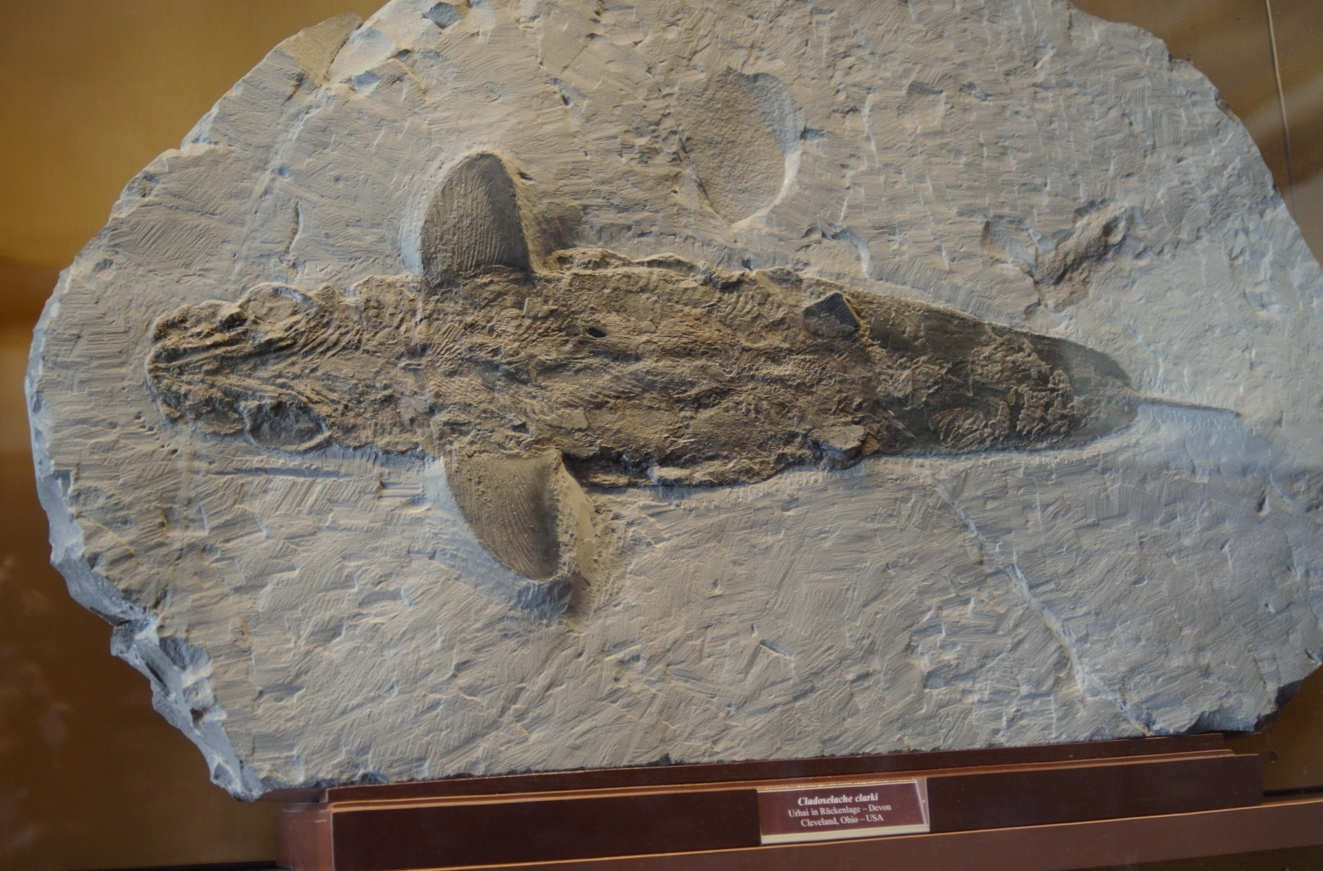
Cladoscelache found in the Natural History Museum in Vienna

== Contributions to paleontology & research focus ==
Valentina Karatajute-Talimaa made significant contributions in the study of early vertebrates, with a focus on chondrichthyans. Some of her research spanned from the Middle Ordovician to upper Silurian strata. One of her notable contributions involves the investigation of isolated scale remains found in these strata. These remains have been attributed to chondrichthyans, including a diverse array of taxa such as elegestolepids, sinacanthids, Tezakia, Canyonlepis, Tantalepis, Kannathalepis, Pilolepis, and the widely distributed mongolepids. This extensive collection of remains, largely microscopic in nature, has provided valuable insights into the early evolution and diversity of chondrichthyans during the Great Ordovician Biodiversification Event. Karatajute-Talimaa's work extended to the re-assessment and re-definition of members of the Mongolepidida, a group she first described in collaboration with colleagues in 1990. The Mongolepids were initially discovered in the Chargat Formation in north-western Mongolia, with species such as Mongolepis rozmanae, Teslepis jucunda, and Sodolepis lucens. Her research also contributed to the extension of the stratigraphic ranges of Mongolepis and Teslepis into the Aeronian and Sheinwoodian periods. The taxonomic placement of the mongolepids faced challenges due to the absence of articulated specimens that exhibited anatomical details of their body plan. However, Karatajute-Talimaa's work laid the foundation for a better understanding of these ancient vertebrates.

== Awards/Accomplishments ==
- On 12 October 2002 Karatajūtė-Talimaa became an honorary member of the Society of Vertebrate Paleontology and the Lithuanian Geological Society.
- The Presidium of the Lithuanian Academy of Sciences awarded Karatajūtė-Talimaa the Academician Juozas Dalinkevičius Prize in April 2003 for her contributions toward research in Lithuanian stratigraphy, and research on the oldest Paleozoic vertebrates.
- She wrote and published 14 geological research papers including finishing and publishing the Thelodonti in 2007 with the help of Susan Turner and Tiiu Märss in the multi-volume universal monograph Handbook of Palaeoichthyology.
- In 2020, she was a recipient of the Golden Hammer, an award for her accomplishments in the field of geological sciences.
