= Amamriabatis =

Amamriabatis Temporal range: Bartonian

Scientific classification
- Kingdom: Animalia
- Phylum: Chordata
- Class: Chondrichthyes
- Subclass: Elasmobranchii
- Order: Myliobatiformes
- Family: Mobulidae
- Genus: †Amamriabatis; Adnet et al., 2020

Extinct genus of Devilray

Amamriabatis is an extinct genus of devil ray from the Eocene epoch. It in honor of Amamria, Tunisia, a hamlet near the type locality whose people were hospitable to researchers. It contains a single species, A. heni. It was named for Mr. Kamel Hen, who provided help during the field season in which this species was first collected. It is known from the Bartonian-aged Souar-Fortuna formations of Tunisia and possibly the late Eocene of Egypt. It is similar to many early devil rays.
