= Eleotris omuamuaensis =

Eleotris omuamuaensis Temporal range: Tortonian

Scientific classification
- Kingdom: Animalia
- Phylum: Chordata
- Class: Actinopterygii
- Division: Teleostei
- Order: Gobiiformes
- Family: Eleotridae
- Genus: Eleotris
- Species: †E. omuamuaensis

Binomial name
- †Eleotris omuamuaensis Schwarzhans et al., 2020

Extinct species of fish

Eleotris omuamuaensis is an extinct species of sleeper goby in the genus Eleotris that lived during the Tortonian stage of the Neogene period.

== Distribution ==
Eleotris omuamuaensis fossils are known from Italy.
