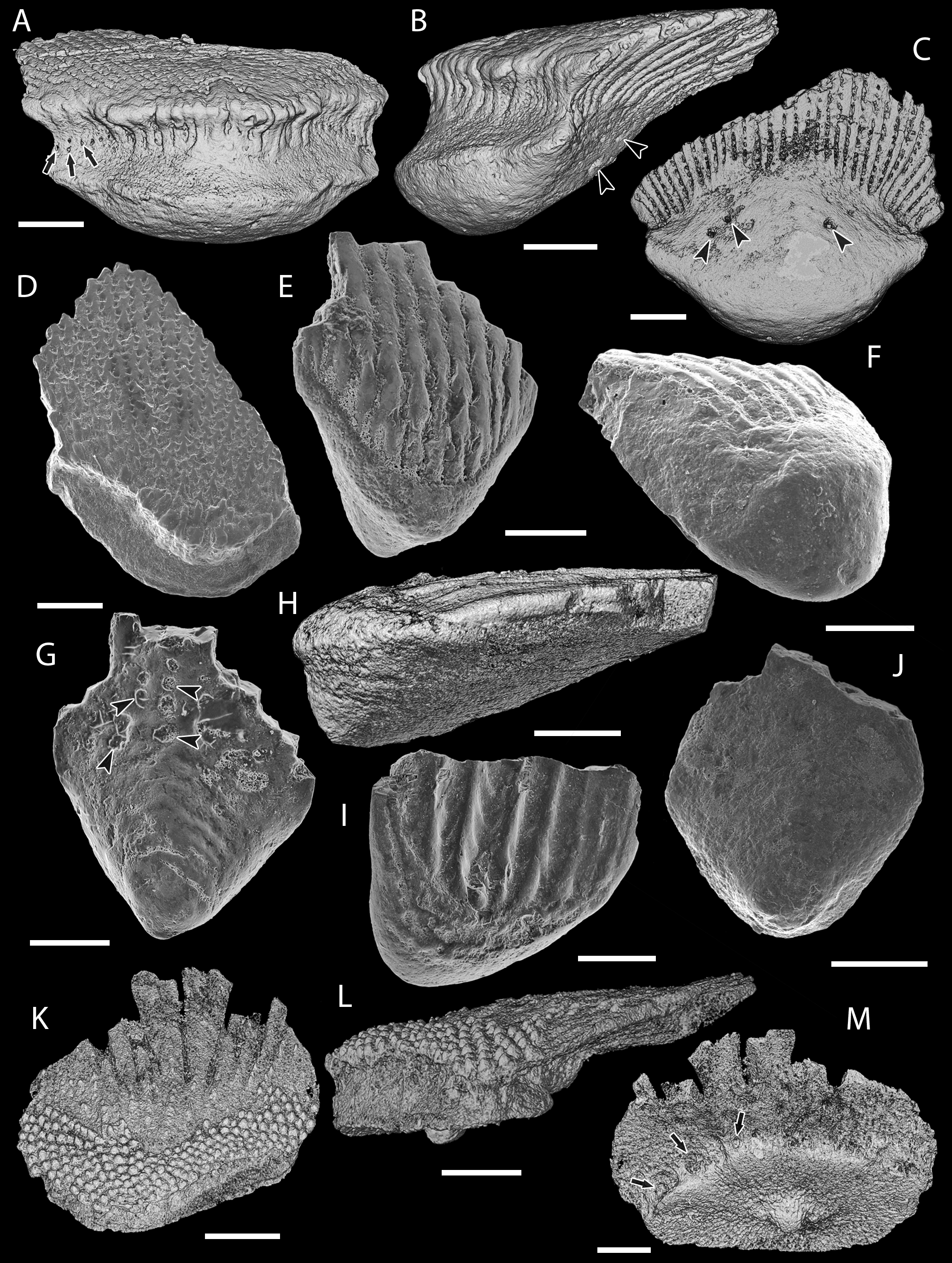
- Scales of Mongolepis rozmanae (A–D), Teslepis jucunda (E–G), Sodolepis lucens (H–J) and Rongolepis cosmetica (K–M)

Scientific classification
- Kingdom: Animalia
- Phylum: Chordata
- Class: Chondrichthyes
- Order: †Mongolepidida; Karatajūtė-Talimaa, Novitskaya, Rozman & Sodov, 1990

Subgroups
- See text

= Mongolepidida =

Mongolepidida Temporal range: Sandbian–Sheinwoodian

Extinct order of cartilaginous fishes

Mongolepidida is an order of primitive chondrichthyans (cartilaginous fishes) that lived during the Ordovician and Silurian periods of Asia and North America. They are only known from scales, so their appearance is largely unknown. The oldest of these scales, belonging to Solinalepis levis, have been dated back to the Sandbian age of the Ordovician, making mongolepidids some of the oldest chondrichthyans known to date.

== Taxonomy ==
Based on Andreev et al. (2016) and Andreev et al. (2020):

- Family †Mongolepididae Karatajūtė-Talimaa et al., 1990
  - †Mongolepis Karatajūtė-Talimaa et al., 1990
  - †Rongolepis Sansom et al., 2000
  - †Sodolepis Karatajūtė-Talimaa & Novitskaya, 1997
  - †Taklamakanolepis Andreev et al., 2020
  - †Teslepis Karatajūtė-Talimaa & Novitskaya, 1992
- Family †Shiqianolepidae Sansom et al., 2000
  - †Chenolepis Sansom et al., 2000
  - †Shiqianolepis Sansom et al., 2000
  - †Tielikewatielepis Andreev et al., 2020
  - †Xiaohaizilepis Andreev et al., 2020
  - †Xinjiangichthys Wang et al., 1998
- Family incertae sedis
  - †Solinalepis Andreev et al., 2016
