= Amamria =

Amamria Temporal range: Bartonian

Scientific classification
- Kingdom: Animalia
- Phylum: Chordata
- Class: Mammalia
- Infraclass: Placentalia
- Order: Primates
- Genus: †Amamria
- Species: †A. tunisiensis

Binomial name
- †Amamria tunisiensis Marivaux et al., 2014

Extinct genus of primates

Amamria is an extinct genus of primate that lived during the Bartonian stage of the Eocene epoch.

== Distribution ==
Amamria tunisiensis is known from Djebel el Kébar in central Tunisia.
