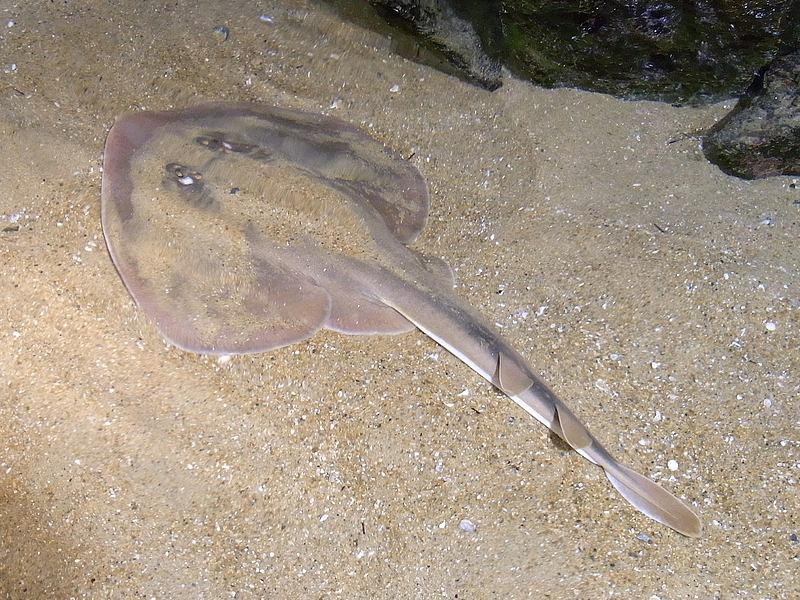
- Fanray (Platyrhina sinensis)
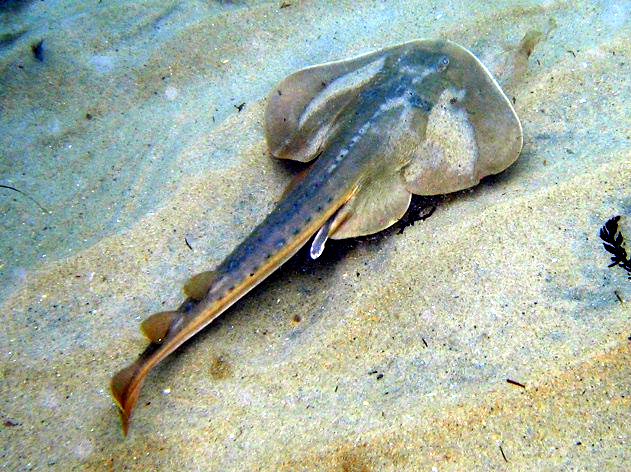
- Thornback guitarfish (Platyrhinoidis triseriata)

Scientific classification
- Kingdom: Animalia
- Phylum: Chordata
- Class: Chondrichthyes
- Subclass: Elasmobranchii
- Order: Torpediniformes
- Family: Platyrhinidae; D. S. Jordan, 1923

= Platyrhinidae =

Platyrhinidae Temporal range: Turonian–present

Family of cartilaginous fishes

The Platyrhinidae are a family of rays, commonly known as thornbacks due to their dorsal rows of large thorns. They resemble guitarfishes in shape. Though traditionally classified with stingrays, molecular evidence suggests they are more closely related to electric rays in the order Torpediniformes.

The earliest fossil member of this family is Tingitanius from the Late Cretaceous (Turonian) of the Akrabou Formation in Morocco, known from a three-dimensionally preserved juvenile specimen. Tingitanius is thought to be the sister genus to Platyrhinoidis. Stem-members of this family also known from fossil remains are Britobatos from the Santonian of Sahel Alma, Lebanon, Tethybatis from the Campanian/Maastrichtian of Nardo, Italy, and Eoplatyrhina from the Ypresian of Monte Bolca, Italy.

== Genera and species ==
- Genus Platyrhina J. P. Müller & Henle, 1838
  - Platyrhina hyugaensis Iwatsuki, Miyamoto & Nakaya, 2011 (Hyuga fanray)
  - Platyrhina sinensis Bloch & J. G. Schneider, 1801 (fanray)
  - Platyrhina tangi Iwatsuki, J. Zhang & Nakaya, 2011 (yellow-spotted fanray)
- Genus Platyrhinoidis Garman 1881
  - Platyrhinoidis triseriata D. S. Jordan & Gilbert, 1880 (thornback guitarfish)

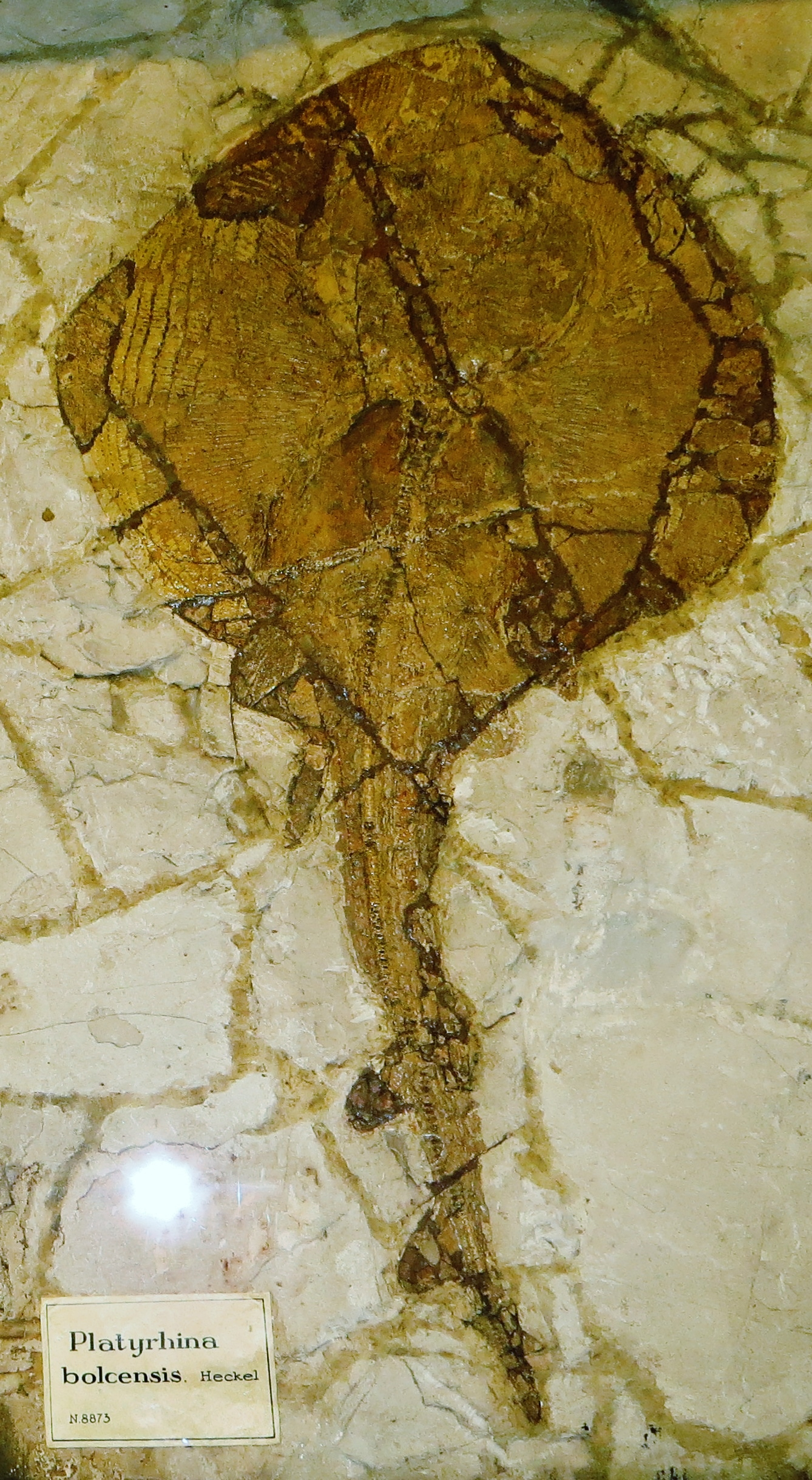
Fossil specimen of Eoplatyrhina

The following fossil species are known:

- Genus †Britobatos Claeson, Underwood & Ward, 2013
  - †B. primarmatus (Woodward, 1889) (=Raja primarmata Woodward, 1889)
- Genus †Eoplatyrhina Marramà, Carnevale, Claeson, Naylor & Kriwet, 2020
  - †E. bolcensis (Heckel, 1851) (=Platyrhina bolcensis Heckel, 1851)
- Genus †Tingitanius Claeson, Underwood & Ward, 2013
  - †T. tenuimandibulus Claeson, Underwood & Ward, 2013
- Genus †Tethybatis de Carvalho, 2004
  - †T. selachoides de Carvalho, 2004
