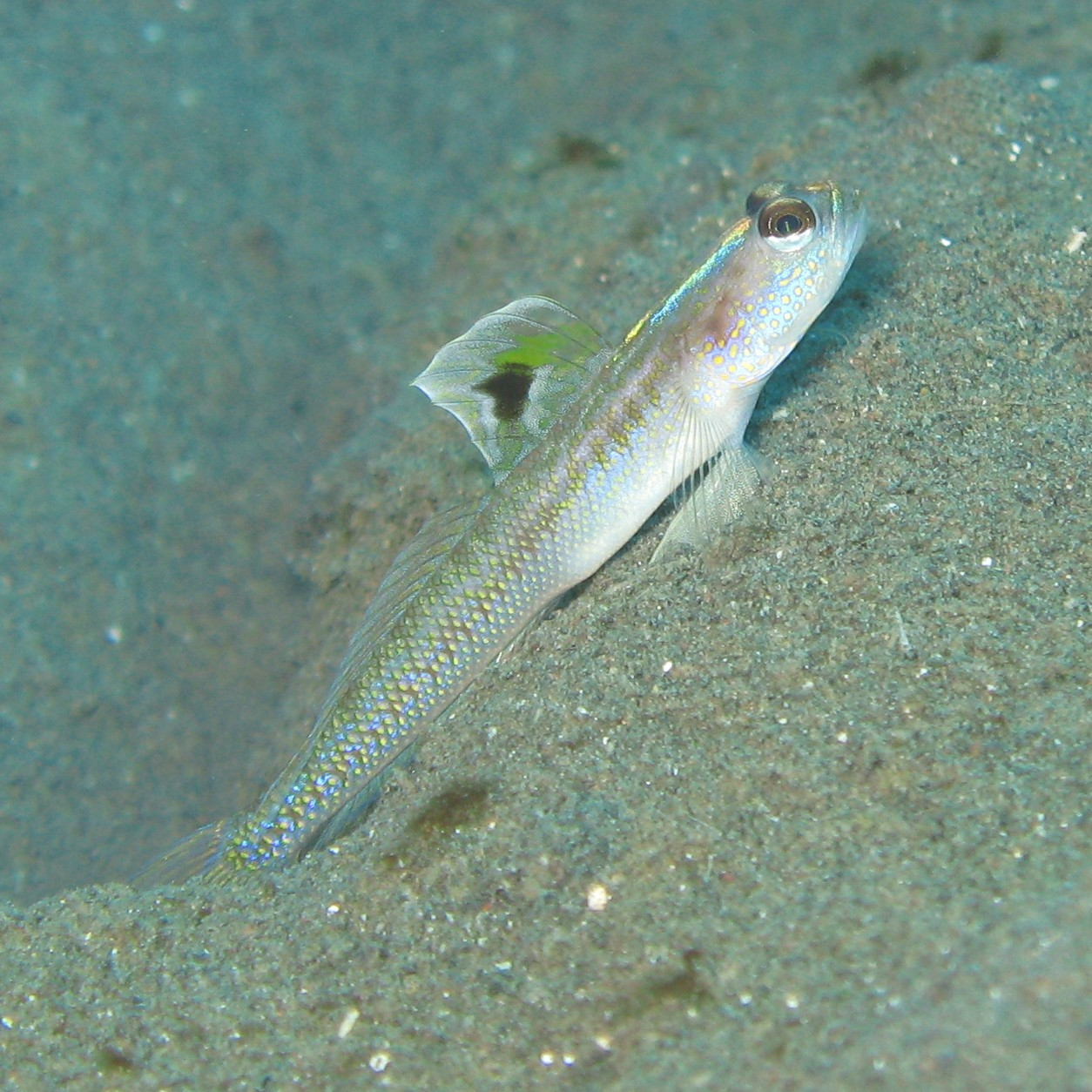
- Vanderhorstia sp. (Leyte, Philippines)

Scientific classification
- Kingdom: Animalia
- Phylum: Chordata
- Class: Actinopterygii
- Order: Gobiiformes
- Family: Gobiidae
- Genus: Vanderhorstia; J. L. B. Smith, 1949

Type species
- Gobius delagoae Barnard, 1937

= Vanderhorstia =

Genus of fishes

Vanderhorstia is a genus of gobies native to the Indian and Pacific oceans. The name of this genus honours the Dutch biologist Cornelius van der Horst (1889-1951) of the University of the Witwatersrand, Johannesburg, who was well known for his interest in marine biology.

== Species ==
These are the current recognized species in this genus:

- Vanderhorstia ambanoro Fourmanoir, 1957 (Ambanoro prawn-goby)
- Vanderhorstia atriclypea Garman, 1903
- Vanderhorstia attenuata J. E. Randall, 2007 (Tapertail shrimpgoby)
- Vanderhorstia auronotata J. E. Randall, 2007 (Gold-marked shrimpgoby)
- Vanderhorstia auropunctata Tomiyama, 1955
- Vanderhorstia bella D. W. Greenfield & Longenecker, 2005
- Vanderhorstia belloides J. E. Randall, 2007 (Bella shrimpgoby)
- Vanderhorstia cyanolineata T. Suzuki & I. S. Chen, 2014
- Vanderhorstia delagoae Barnard, 1937 (Candystick Goby)
- Vanderhorstia dawnarnallae Gerald R. Allen, Mark V. Erdmann & Meity Mongdong, 2019
- Vanderhorstia dorsomacula J. E. Randall, 2007 (Dorsalspot shrimpgoby)
- Vanderhorstia flavilineata G. R. Allen & Munday, 1995 (Yellow-lined shrimpgoby)
- Vanderhorstia fulvopelvis T. Suzuki & I. S. Chen, 2014
- Vanderhorstia hiramatsui Iwata, Shibukawa & Ohnishi, 2007
- Vanderhorstia kizakura Iwata, Shibukawa & Ohnishi, 2007
- Vanderhorstia lepidobucca G. R. Allen, Peristiwady & Erdmann, 2014 (Scalycheek shrimpgoby)
- Vanderhorstia longimanus M. C. W. Weber, 1909
- Vanderhorstia macropteryx V. Franz, 1910 (Bigfin shrimpgoby)
- Vanderhorstia mertensi Klausewitz, 1974 (Mertens' prawn-goby)
- Vanderhorstia nannai R. Winterbottom, Iwata & Kozawa, 2005 (Moon-spotted shrimp goby)
- Vanderhorstia nobilis G. R. Allen & J. E. Randall, 2006 (Majestic shrimpgoby)
- Vanderhorstia opercularis J. E. Randall, 2007
- Vanderhorstia ornatissima J. L. B. Smith, 1959 (Ornate prawn-goby)
- Vanderhorstia papilio Shibukawa & T. Suzuki, 2004 (Butterfly shrimpgoby)
- Vanderhorstia phaeosticta J. E. Randall, K. T. Shao & J. P. Chen, 2007 (Yellowfoot shrimpgoby)
- Vanderhorstia puncticeps S. M. Deng & G. Q. Xiong, 1980
- Vanderhorstia rapa Iwata, Shibukawa & Ohnishi, 2007
- Vanderhorstia steelei J. E. Randall & Munday, 2008
- Vanderhorstia supersaiyan K. Koeda, H. Hirasaka & M. Sato, 2025
- Vanderhorstia vandersteene Allen, Erdmann & Brooks, 2020
- Vanderhorstia wayag G. R. Allen & Erdmann, 2012 (Wayag shrimpgoby)
