= Tanyrhinichthys =

Tanyrhinichthys Temporal range: Kasimovian ~307–303.7 Ma

Scientific classification
- Domain: Eukaryota
- Kingdom: Animalia
- Phylum: Chordata
- Class: Actinopterygii
- Genus: †Tanyrhinichthys; Gottfried, 1987

Type species
- †Tanyrhinichthys mcallisteri Gottfried, 1987

Extinct genus of fishes

Tanyrhinichthys is an extinct genus of prehistoric ray-finned fish with a lengthened rostrum that lived during the Kasimovian (Missourian) age (Upper Pennsylvanian, Upper Carboniferous) in what is now New Mexico, United States. Fossils were recovered from Tinajas Member of the Atrasado Formation (Kinney Brick Quarry).

== Ecology and evolution ==
Tanyrhinichthys had an elongated rostrum equipped with sensory canals, which allowed it to find prey organisms hidden in the substrate, similar to modern sturgeons. It is one of the first actinopterygians to independently evolve an elongate rostrum during the Paleozoic Era, along with Tegeolepis and Phanerorhynchus.

== See also ==
- Prehistoric fish
- List of prehistoric bony fish
