= Eleotris tyrrhenicus =

Eleotris tyrrhenicus Temporal range: Tortonian

Scientific classification
- Kingdom: Animalia
- Phylum: Chordata
- Class: Actinopterygii
- Division: Teleostei
- Order: Gobiiformes
- Family: Eleotridae
- Genus: Eleotris
- Species: †E. tyrrhenicus

Binomial name
- †Eleotris tyrrhenicus Schwarzhans et al., 2020

Extinct species of fish

Eleotris tyrrhenicus is an extinct species of sleeper goby in the genus Eleotris that lived during the Tortonian stage of the Neogene period.

== Distribution ==
Eleotris tyrrhenicus fossils are known from Italy.
