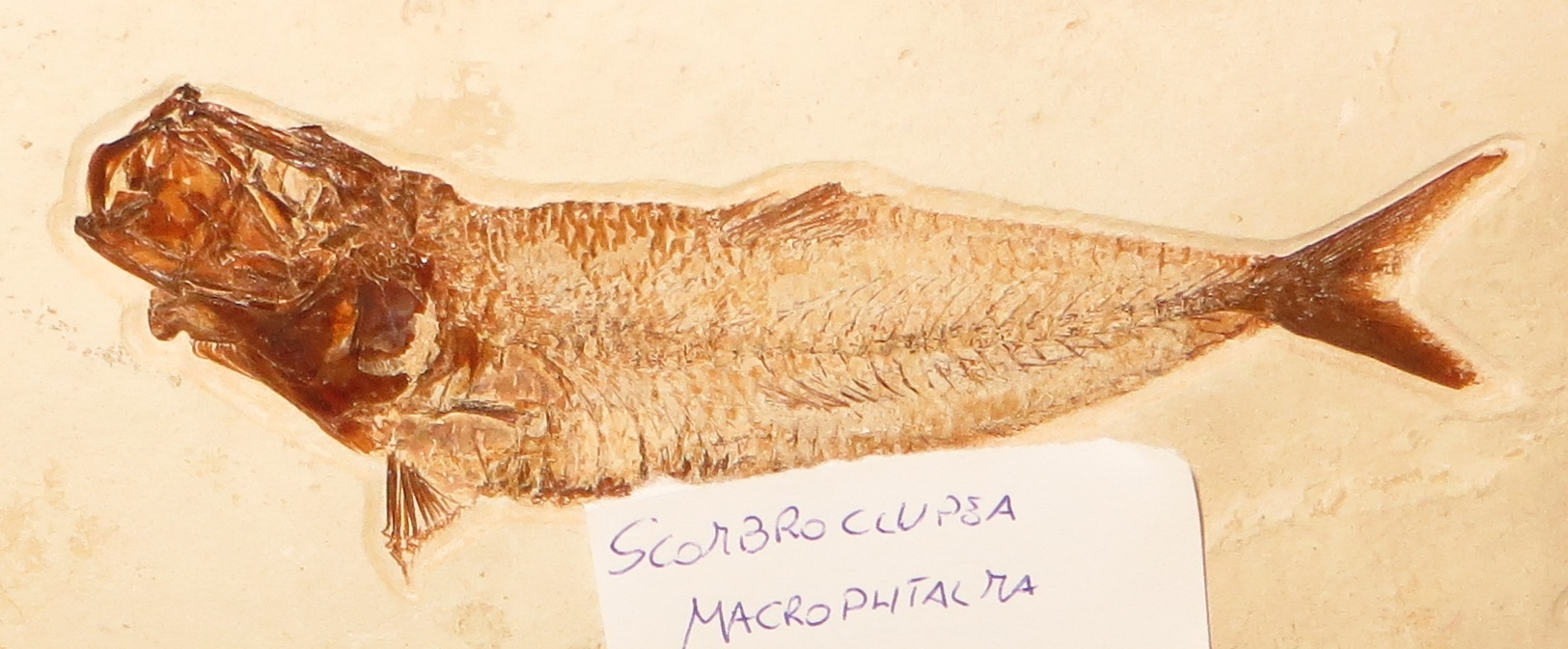
- Scombroclupea macrophtalma

Scientific classification
- Kingdom: Animalia
- Phylum: Chordata
- Class: Actinopterygii
- Order: Clupeiformes
- Superfamily: †Clupeoidea
- Genus: †Scombroclupea; Kner, 1863

= Scombroclupea =

Scombroclupea Temporal range: Cenomanian

Extinct genus of fishes

Scombroclupea is an extinct genus of prehistoric bony fish that lived during the Cenomanian.
