= Hyuga fanray =

Conservation status
- Vulnerable (IUCN 3.1)

Scientific classification
- Kingdom: Animalia
- Phylum: Chordata
- Class: Chondrichthyes
- Subclass: Elasmobranchii
- Order: Torpediniformes
- Family: Platyrhinidae
- Genus: Platyrhina
- Species: P. hyugaensis

Binomial name
- Platyrhina hyugaensis Iwatsuki, Miyamoto & Nakaya, 2011
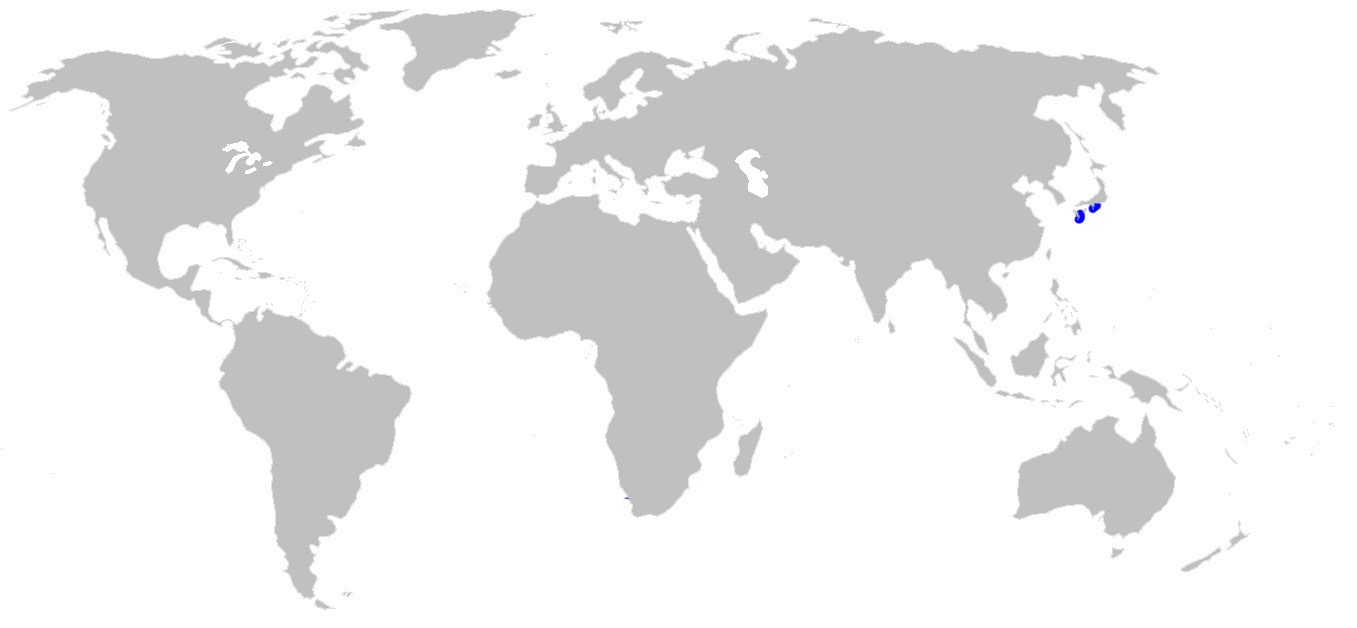
- Range of Hyuga fanray

Ray species

The Hyuga fanray (Platyrhina hyugaensis) is a type of ray of the family Platyrhinidae. It is an endemic species of southern Japan and inhabits shallow region at the depths of 1–50 m (3 ft 3 in – 164 ft 1 in). The population of this ray are decreasing due to continuous human exploitation.

== Description ==
The Hyuga fanray can be differentiated from its congeners because of numerous characteristics, including a pair of thorns on anterior part of scapular section, a row of thorns on mid-dorsum of tail, and dermal denticles of uniform size and shape covering the dorsal surface.

== Habitat and distribution ==
This species is known to live in the continental shelf at depths of 1–50 m (3 ft 3 in – 164 ft 1 in). Its endemic and common habitat is Hyūga Sea in southern Miyazaki Prefecture, although there have also been several discoveries in Kagoshima and Mie Prefectures.

The Hyuga fanray experiences a decline in population because it is often taken as bycatch with gillnets or trawls, and probably is used for human consumption. It is predicted that the ray has undergone a population depletion of up to 49% over the past 21 years.
