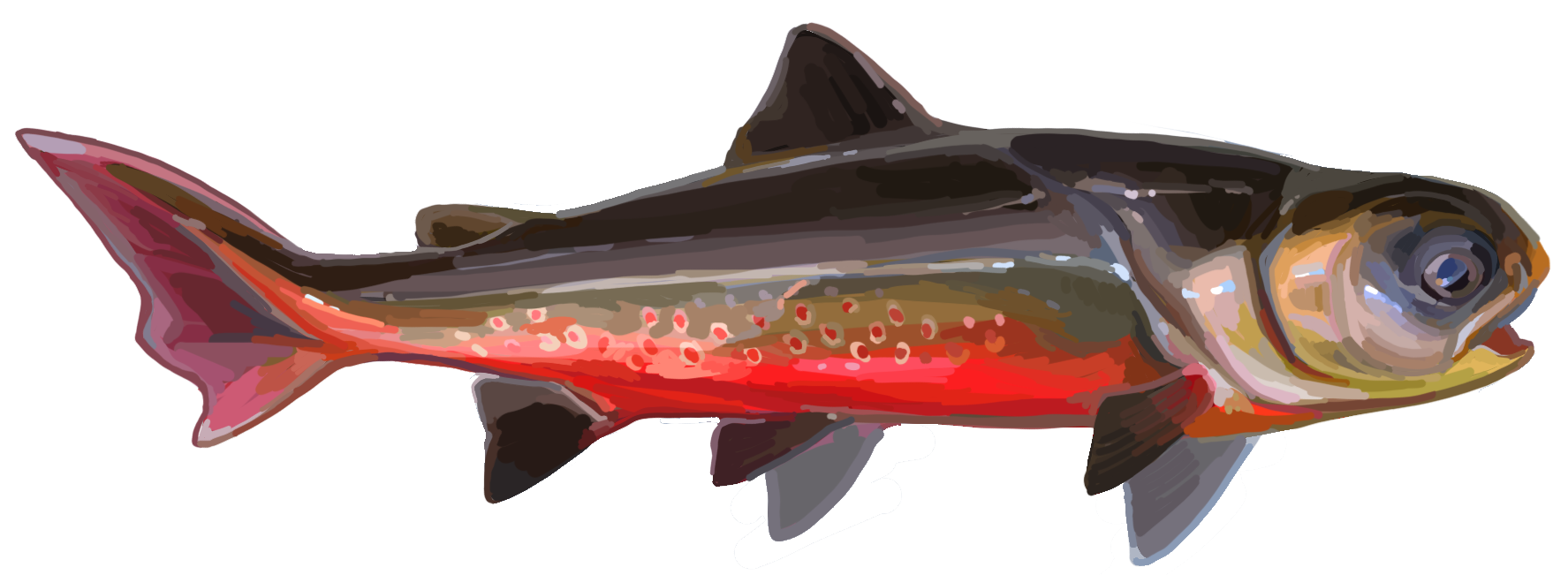
- Artist's reconstruction

Scientific classification
- Kingdom: Animalia
- Phylum: Chordata
- Class: †Placodermi
- Order: †Arthrodira
- Suborder: †Brachythoraci
- Family: †Selenosteidae
- Genus: †Bulongosteus
- Species: †B. liui

Binomial name
- †Bulongosteus liui Liu et al., 2020

= Bulongosteus =

Bulongosteus Temporal range: Early Famennian 370 Ma

Devonian placoderm

Bulongosteus liui is an extinct genus of selenosteid arthrodire placoderm from the Early Famennian upper Zhulumute Formation of what is now the Junggar Basin of Xinjiang. It is the first arthrodire known from the region and the first aspinothoracid arthrodire known from continental strata. It lived in a braided river environment, and is believed to be euryhaline.

== Description ==
Bulongosteus is known from a single fragmentary head and trunk shield, the anatomy of which differs from other selenosteids. The fragments connected form a shield with a length of over 18 cm (7.1 in), though the size and features of its full body are unknown. It is identified as a member of the family by its large orbitals and slender posterior. Its plating is smooth and featureless. It most resembles the selenosteids Pachyosteus and Melanosteus.

== Paleoecology ==
Pachyosteomorphids had previously only been found in marine strata, indicating they were saltwater group. However, the Zhulumute Formation in which Bulongosteus was found was a braided river environment, indicating Bulongosteus could tolerate freshwater. This corroborates earlier research which indicated placoderms could tolerate a wide range of salinities, and implies Bulongosteus may have traveled between salt and freshwater ecosystems as well.
