= Embayment Megagroup =

Geologic strata in North America

- Stratigraphic range: Cretaceous-Eocene
- Type: Mega Group
- Sub-units: Mounds Gravel, Grover Gravel; Wilcox Formation; Porters Creek Formation; Clayton Formation; Owl Creek Formation; McNairy Formation; Post Creek Formation
- Thickness: upto ~1000'

Lithology
- Primary: Sandstone, Clay
- Other: Siltstone, Lignite

Location
- Region: Alabama, Arkansas, Illinois, Kentucky, Mississippi, Missouri, Tennessee
- Country: United States
- Extent: Gulf Coast Plain to Southern Illinois

The Embayment Mega Group is found from the Gulf of Mexico north to southern Illinois.

== Stratigraphy ==
=== Mounds Gravel ===
The Mounds Gravel is found in southern Illinois. It is composed of chert and quarts pebbles.

=== Grover Gravel ===
The Grover Gravel (Rubey, 1952) is found in western Illinois. Named for Grover, Missouri. It is composed of chert pebbles, quartz pebbles, as well as a matrix of quartz sand.

=== Willcox Formation ===
The Wilcox Formation is a sand formation that is part of the Embayment Megagroup. It runs from southern Illinois to the State of Mississippi. It thickens moving southward, starting at about ~20' thick in outcrops in Illinois to 250' thick in Mississippi.

=== Porters Creek Formation ===
The Porters Creek is found in southern Illinois. It is massive in nature and lacks bedding or has weak bedding surfaces. it is composed of over 80 percent montmorillonite. This clay is mined commercially in Pulaski County, Illinois.

=== Clayton Formation ===
The Clayton Formation is made up of clay. The clay is green to buff in color and is silty throughout. At the formation's base it becomes sandy with pebbles. The pebbles are made of chert and are black or white in color.

=== Owl Creek Formation ===
The Owl Creek Formation is a geologic formation ranging from Tennessee to Mississippi. It preserves marine fossils dating back to the Cretaceous period. Shark teeth and mosasaur remains are common. Ornithomimid and ceratopsid remains are known from the formation. The ceratopsid tooth could represent a chasmosaurine.

=== McNairy Formation ===
The McNairy Formation was formed as a deltaic deposit. The upper and lower parts consists of cross-bedded white to light grey micaceous sand. The middle section is made up of grey to blackish silt, with beds of lignite. This formation is up to 450'.

=== Post Creek Formation ===
The Post Creek Formation was once called the Tuscaloosa Formation. It has been renamed due to inconsistencies with dating the formation. It is composed of chert gravel and has moderate cementations by silica or kaolinite.

=== Baylis Formation ===
The Baylis Formation is Cretaceous in age and found in the western sections of the Embayment Megagroup. It rests unconformably on Carboniferous age rock. It is composed of medium to fine grained quartz sand. The upper part of the formation is the Kiser Creek Member. It also contains lenses that may contain, clay, silt and pebbles. The lower member is the Hadley Gravel Member and contains mostly pebbles.
