= Johannaspis =

Johannaspis Temporal range: Early Devonian

Scientific classification
- Domain: Eukaryota
- Kingdom: Animalia
- Phylum: Chordata
- Class: †Placodermi
- Order: †Arthrodira
- Suborder: †Brachythoraci
- Family: †Homostiidae
- Genus: †Johannaspis
- Species: †J. bohemicus

Binomial name
- †Johannaspis bohemicus Vaškaninová, 2020

Extinct genus of fish

Johannaspis is an extinct genus of homostiid that inhabited what is today the Czech Republic during the Early Devonian. It contains a single species, J. bohemicus.
