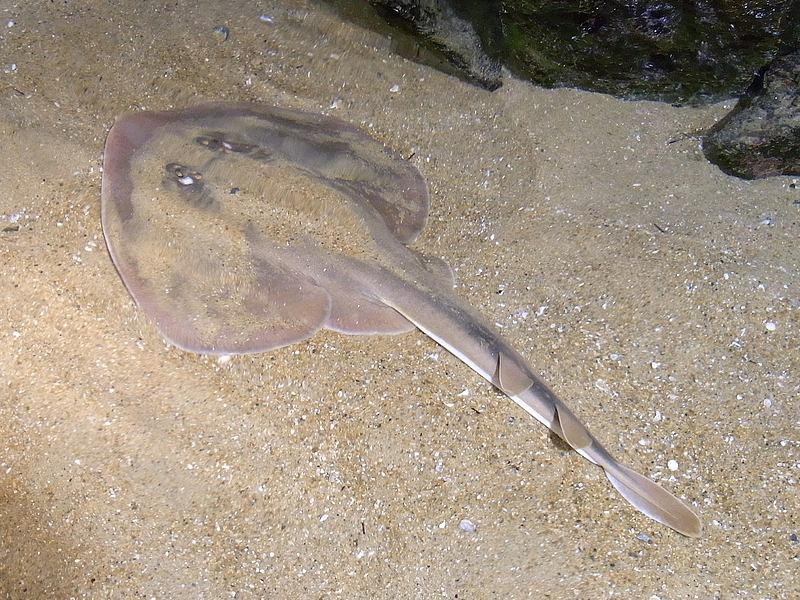
- Fanray (P. sinensis)

Scientific classification
- Kingdom: Animalia
- Phylum: Chordata
- Class: Chondrichthyes
- Subclass: Elasmobranchii
- Order: Torpediniformes
- Family: Platyrhinidae
- Genus: Platyrhina; J. P. Müller & Henle, 1838

Type species
- Rhina sinensis Bloch & J. G. Schneider, 1801

Synonyms
- Analithis Gistel, 1848; Discobatus Garman, 1881

= Platyrhina =

Genus of cartilaginous fishes

Platyrhina is a genus of rays in the family Platyrhinidae, containing four species. They are native to the warm-temperate to tropical marine waters in the western Pacific Ocean. They are little-known bottom-dwellers that feed on small invertebrates such as crustaceans, molluscs, and worms. The fanray is found inshore to a depth of 60 m on rocky or rock sandy bottoms.

Platyrhina species have rounded, heart-shaped pectoral fin discs with short, blunt snouts. Their tails are long and shark-like, slightly flattened with lateral ridges. The two dorsal fins and the caudal fin are large and rounded; the caudal fin lacks a lower lobe. The teeth are small and arranged in pavement-like rows for crushing shelled prey. Their bodies are covered with minute dermal denticles; also, several rows of denticles are located inside the buccopharyngeal cavity. The shape of these denticles in Platyrhina and the similar Platyrhinoidis distinguish them from all other guitarfish species. Large thorns occur around the eyes and on the shoulders, and are arranged in rows along the back and tail. Unlike Platyrhinoidis, Platyrhina species have an additional lateral row of thorns on both sides of the tail, and no rostral thorns.

As far as known, they are ovoviviparous, with the developing fetuses primarily sustained by large yolk sacs. Research on fanrays in Ariake Bay, Japan, indicates they are faster-growing, earlier-maturing, and shorter-lived than many other ray species. Male fanrays mature at 2.1 years and females at 2.9 years; the females grow larger and more slowly than males. The maximum known age is 5 years for males and 12 years for females. These rays are typically inoffensive, but care should be exercised regarding their large, sharp thorns.

== Species ==
- Platyrhina hyugaensis Iwatsuki, Miyamoto & Nakaya, 2011 (Hyuga fanray)
- Platyrhina psomadakisi White & Last, 2016 (Indian Fanray)
- Platyrhina sinensis Bloch & J. G. Schneider, 1801 (fanray)
- Platyrhina tangi Iwatsuki, J. Zhang & Nakaya, 2011 (yellow-spotted fanray)

== See also ==
- List of prehistoric cartilaginous fish
