= Brachyplatystoma elbakyani =

Brachyplatystoma elbakyani Temporal range: Late Miocene 11.6–7.3 Ma

Scientific classification
- Kingdom: Animalia
- Phylum: Chordata
- Class: Actinopterygii
- Order: Siluriformes
- Family: Pimelodidae
- Genus: Brachyplatystoma
- Species: †B. elbakyani

Binomial name
- †Brachyplatystoma elbakyani Agnolin & Bogan, 2020

Extinct species of freshwater fish

Brachyplatystoma elbakyani is an extinct species of freshwater fish of the genus Brachyplatystoma (a group also called Goliath catfishes) that lived during the Late Miocene in what is now northeastern Argentina.

== Taxonomy ==
This species was originally described in 2020 by Federico Lisandro Agnolín and Sergio Bogan, based on specimens collected in the late 19th and early 20th centuries. The holotype specimen of this species is catalogued as MACN Pv 16091. It is housed in the ichthyology section of the vertebrate paleontological collection at the Bernardino Rivadavia Natural Sciences Argentine Museum in Buenos Aires. The fossil consists of the frontoethmoid/vomerine region of the skull. It was also referred to as MACN Pv 15989, corresponding to an incomplete ethmoidal/vomerine region of the skull.

== Etymology ==
The generic name Brachyplatystoma comes from Greek; brachys means 'short', platys means 'flat', and estoma means 'mouth'. The specific name is named after the Kazakh software developer and neuroscientist Alexandra Elbakyan for her efforts to open access to science through Sci-Hub.

== Distribution ==
Fossil remains of Brachyplatystoma elbakyani were recovered in Paraná, Entre Ríos, around 2000 km south of the genus's current southernmost geographic range in the Amazon river basin. It is also found in the river basins of the Orinoco and in large rivers of the Guianas.
