= Benthophilus labronicus =

Benthophilus labronicus Temporal range: Messinian

Scientific classification
- Kingdom: Animalia
- Phylum: Chordata
- Class: Actinopterygii
- Division: Teleostei
- Order: Gobiiformes
- Family: Gobiidae
- Genus: Benthophilus
- Species: †B. labronicus

Binomial name
- †Benthophilus labronicus Schwarzhans et al., 2020

Extinct species of fish

Benthophilus labronicus is an extinct species of Benthophilus that lived during the Messinian stage of the Neogene period.

== Distribution ==
Benthophilus labronicus is known from fossils found in Italy.
