= Microtriftis =

Microtriftis Temporal range: Eocene

Scientific classification
- Kingdom: Animalia
- Phylum: Chordata
- Class: Chondrichthyes
- Subclass: Elasmobranchii
- Order: Myliobatiformes
- Genus: †Microtriftis
- Species: †M. matami

Binomial name
- †Microtriftis matami Sambou et al., 2020

Extinct genus of cartilaginous fishes

Microtriftis is an extinct genus of stingray that lived during the Eocene epoch. It contains the single species Microtriftis matami.

== Distribution ==
Microtriftis matami is known from the Matam Formation of Senegal.
