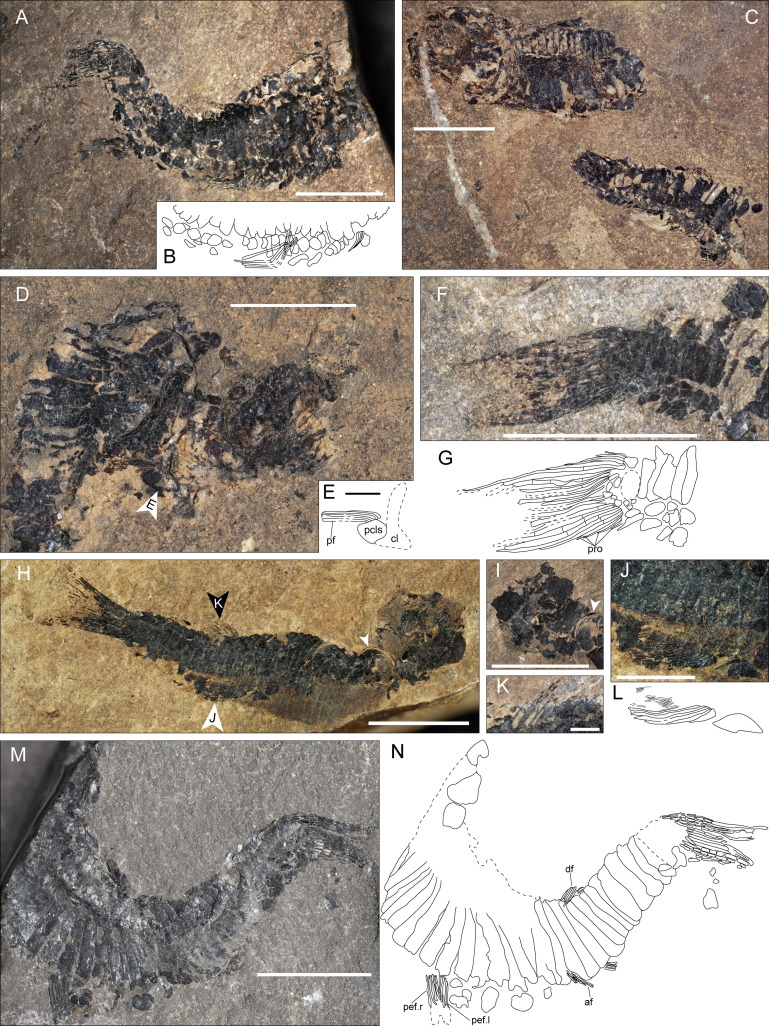
- Habroichthys dincae

Scientific classification
- Kingdom: Animalia
- Phylum: Chordata
- Class: Actinopterygii
- Order: †Peltopleuriformes
- Family: †Habroichthyidae; Garadiner, 1967
- Genus: †Habroichthys; Brough, 1939

Type genus
- H. minimus Brough, 1939

Species
- see text

= Habroichthys =

Habroichthys Temporal range: Middle Triassic (Anisian-Ladinian)

Extinct genus of fishes

Habroichthys is an extinct genus of marine peltopleuriform ray-finned fish from the Middle Triassic, and is the only genus of the monotypic family Habroichthyidae. Fossils of the fish have been found in a number of countries being Slovenia, Italy, and China. Species within the genus were small with the largest species having a standard length of only 50 millimetres (2.0 in). Due to their small size, the preservation of the skull bones of the fish are usually poorly preserved, resulting in species being identified by the number of flank scales along with the placement of certain fins on the body. Within their environment, Habroichthys would have been a very common fish and would have contributed a large amount of biomass in their ecosystems. Overall, these fish would have most likely behaved like a number of modern schooling fish that swim near the water's surface. There are currently 12 valid species attributed to the genus.

== History ==
The type species of Habroichthys, H. minimus, was first descripted in 1939 by Brough based on an incomplete specimen (BMNH P. 19359) that lacked a number of skull elements along with the paired fins of the fish. The species would later be redescribed by Bürgin (1992) based on material that has been attributed to the Besano Formation and the Meride Limestone. Along with this, he would also describe a second species of the genus, H. griffithi, along with some specimens of indeterminate species. Between the description of the second species and 2010, a number of specimens had been found at various sites in Italy and Slovenia. The third species, H. broughti, would be described by Lin et al. (2011) based on material excavated from the Guanling Formation and mark the first specimen found in what would have been the Eastern Tethys Ocean. In 2016, Tintori et al. would reassigned a species of Peltopleurus , P. orientalis, to Habroichthys along with the description of another new species, H. dolomiticus, from the Dont Formartion. The most recent paper focusing on Habroichthys was published in 2025 by Conedera et al. in which seven new species were described along with a general overview of the paleoecology, paleoenvironment, and palaeobiogeography for the genus.

== Description ==
Habroichthys was a small, marine fish with most known species within the genus being under 30 millimetres (1.2 in), with the largest having a standard length of up to 50 millimetres (2.0 in). Due to this small size, preservation of skull elements is usually poor. In turn, descriptions of various species are usually identified from one another due to squamation and the position of the fins. Flanks of this fish are covered in a single row of tall scales that ends in a smaller, caudal semicircular scale. Species of the genus differ in the amount of scales in this row with the number ranging between 24 and 42 scales. The position of the dorsal, pelvic, and anal fins also differ between species with this being insertion point being labeled with the scale count. The position of these fins differ between the species along with slightly between individuals. The dorsal fin's position correlating between the 14th-26th scale, pelvic fin ranges between the 8th-16th scale, and anal fins range between the 15th-25th scale. Outside of these features of the postcranium, species of Habroichthys are overall very similar to one another. The caudal fin of is largely symmetrical though the attachment style of the fin rays identify it as a semiheterocercal tail.

The skull of Habroichthys is short and almost box-shaped though with a more rounded transversal outline. All skulls of fish placed within the genus are toothless with a mandible that is longer than the maxilla. Along with this, the maxilla is free from the preopercle but does make contact with it. This is in contrast to other Peltopleuriformes that possess a maxilla that is sutured to the preopercle. The frontals, dermopterotics, and parietals of the fish are fused in most specimens. This fusion creating a single, shield-like structure on the skull roof. Within the operculum, the opercle is larger than the subopercle though the exact ratio between the two bones differ based on the species. Unlike a majority of other stem neopterygians along with a number of modern genera, Habroichthys lacked supraorbitals.

=== Ontogeny ===
In comparison to adults, the smallest specimens of Habroichthys are more dorsoventrally flattened with a lack of scales outside of the large ones found on the flank. The flank scales are also more narrow with them directly extending to the fin insertions unlike in larger individuals. Bases on this, the shape and presence of scales in certain areas of the body can allow one to determine if a specimen is of an adult or a juvenile.

=== Species ===
Species	Age	Location	Localities	Notes	Images
H. bosi	Anisian	Slovenia	Strelovec Formation (Pelsa/Vazzoler Lagerstätte)	Species with a standard length of 13–18 millimetres (0.51–0.71 in) with about 25 flank scales with lateral lines up to the upper half of the semicircular scale. The dorsal fin is placed a few flank scales before the anal fins with both being further up the body than other species.	
H. broughi	Anisian	China	Guanling Formation	Species with a standard length of under 30 millimetres (1.2 in) with between 29 and 32 flank scales.	
H. celarci	Anisian	Slovenia	Strelovec Formation (Pelsa/Vazzoler Lagerstätte)	Species with a standard length of 32–38 millimetres (1.3–1.5 in) with about 31 flank scales. The dorsal fin is placed a few flank scales before the anal fins.	
H. dincae	Upper Ladinian	Italy	Sciliar Formation	Species with a standard length of 35 millimetres (1.4 in) with about 32 flank scales which lack lateral line marks. The dorsal and anal fins are inserted at or near the same position of the body.	
H. dolomiticus	Anisian	Italy	Dont Formation	Species with a standard length of 30 millimetres (1.2 in) with between 38 and 39 flank scales.	
H. flaviae	Late Fassanian or early Longobardian	Italy	Cunardo Formation	Species with a standard length of 21–28 millimetres (0.83–1.10 in) with about 30 flank scales which lack lateral line marks. The dorsal fin is placed a number of flank scales before the anal fins.	
H. griffithi	Boundary between Anisian and Ladinian	Italy and potentially Switzerland	Besano Formation and potenentially Prosanto Formation	A species with a standard length of under 43 millimetres (1.7 in) though potentially could have reached a length of 51 millimetres (2.0 in).	
H. minimus	Boundary between Anisian and Ladinian	Italy and potentially Switzerland	Besano Formation and potenentially Prosanto Formation and Perledo-Varenna Limestone	Type species of the genus. A species with a standard length of under 27 millimetres (1.1 in) with a lateral line that crosses through the semicircular scale.	
H. nietorum	Anisian	Slovenia	Serla Dolomite (Serla Dolomite)	Species with a standard length of 18–21 millimetres (0.71–0.83 in) with about 31 flank scales with the last one processing a lateral line mark. The dorsal fin is placed a few flank scales behind the pelvic fins.	
H. orientalis	Late Ladinian	China	Falang Formation	Species with a standard length of under 27 millimetres (1.1 in) with between 34 and 35 flank scales.	
H. veronikae	Anisian	Slovenia	Strelovec Formation (Pelsa/Vazzoler Lagerstätte)	Species with a standard length of 16–20 millimetres (0.63–0.79 in) with 27-28 flank scales. The dorsal fin is either placed slightly before or in line with the anal fins.	
H. zuitaensis	Late Ladinian	Italy	Sciliar Formation	Species with a standard length of 27–29 millimetres (1.1–1.1 in) with about 40 flank scales which lack lateral line marks. The dorsal and anal fins are inserted at or near the same position of the body.	

== Classification ==
Due to the poor preservation of the skull bones of Habroichthys, the exact phylogenic placement of the genus has not been studied in depth. A number of features such as the flank scales, small size, and the lack of teeth do place it as a member of the order Peltopleuriformes but its placement within it isn't well understood. Even with this being the case, Habroichthys has been included in a few more recent phylogenies. However, it has been stated in papers focusing on the genus that these results are questionable. In these phylogenies, the genus either places near two other Triassic genera Luganoia and Venusichthys, neither of which are considered Peltopleuriformes.

Below is a phylogeny from Near and Thacker, 2024 showing one of the few phylogenies that include Habroichthys:

- Actinopterygii
  - - †Scanilepiformes
    - Polypteridae
  - Actinopteri
    - pan‑acipenseriforms
      - †Boreosomus
      - - †Chondrosteus
        - - †Peipiaosteus
          - Acipenseriformes
    - pan‑neopterygians
      - - †Pycnodontiformes
        - - †Guildayichthyidae
          - †Bobasatraniidae
      - - - †Australosomus
          - †Redfieldiidae
        - - †Platysiagidae
          - - †Dipteronotus
            - - - †Thoracopteridae
                - †Peltopleuridae
              - - †Venusichthys
                - - †Habroichthys
                  - Neopterygii
                    - pan‑holosteans
                      - Holostei
                      - - †Dapediidae
                        - †Hulettia
                    - Pan‑Teleostei
                      - †Pachycormidae
                      - - †Aspidorhynchidae
                        - - †Prohalecites
                          - - †Atacamichthys
                            - - †Pholidophoridae
                              - - †Catervariolus
                                - - †Ankylophoriformes
                                  - - †Dorsetichthys
                                    - - †Ichthyokentema
                                      - - †Leptolepis
                                        - - - †Ascalabos
                                            - †Tharsis
                                          - - †Varasichthyidae
                                            - - †Ichthyodectiformes
                                              - Teleostei
                                                - Oseanacephala
                                                - - †Tselfatiiformes
                                                  - Clupeocephala

== Paleobiology ==
=== Paleoecology ===
The ecology of Habroichthys has most often been compared to modern cryptobenthonic reef fish due to its small size and rapid evolution. Even with these similarities, the fish would most likely not have been found only near the sea floor. Due to a number of mass mortality events and jaw morphology seen in the genus, Habroichthys has been interpreted to be a schooling fish that fed on the planktonic organisms of the ecosystem with some authors even suggesting the ability to filter feed in the genus. Based on the fin morphology, the fish would have most likely been slow-swimming with spending most of its time near the water's surface. Though the ecologies would have been very different, Habroichthys would have played a very similar role to modern cryptobenthonic fish. These fish would have been one of the largest sources of food in their ecosystems as supported by the number of cases that the genus has been found as gut contents of larger predators.

=== Sexual Dimorphism ===
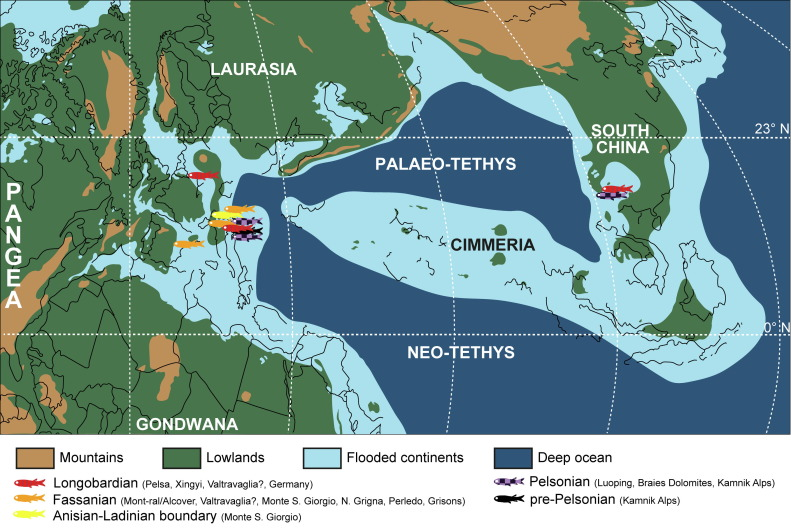
Distribution of Habroichthys during Middle–early Late Triassic

The presence of sexual dimorphism has been considered to be present in Habroichthys based on the presence of two anal fin morphotypes found in specimens. Based on current interpretations, the female fin is one that is less modified. In this morphotype, the fin rays are marginally thinner towards the back along with not being completely parallel to one another. The anterior-most rays of this morphotype are much longer and form a rod-like structure. The more modified anal fin, interpreted to be from males, has a large scale in front of the fin base with the more posterior rays being much different in morphology. These rays are not only thinner but also shorter than the more anterior rays. The last ray of the anal fin is thicker and also possesses at least four hook-like processes. It has been suggested that these two morphotypes would assist with the sperm transfer during reproduction.

=== Paleogeography ===
Based on the regions in which the earliest members of the genus have been found, the origin of Habroichthys was most likely in the Western Tethys Ocean during the Anisian. At this time, there were already four species present which shows that dispersals took place within this region. The spread of the genus to the Eastern Tethys Sea also would happen during the Anisian with the genus being found at deposits in China. This wide distribution would last until the late Ladinian, being the latest record of the genus. This quick dispersion of the genus has been explained to most likely be due to the spread of planktonic larvae through currents.
