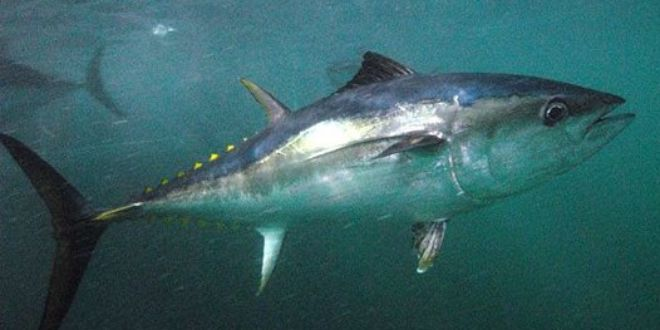
- Thunnus maccoyii, a teleost
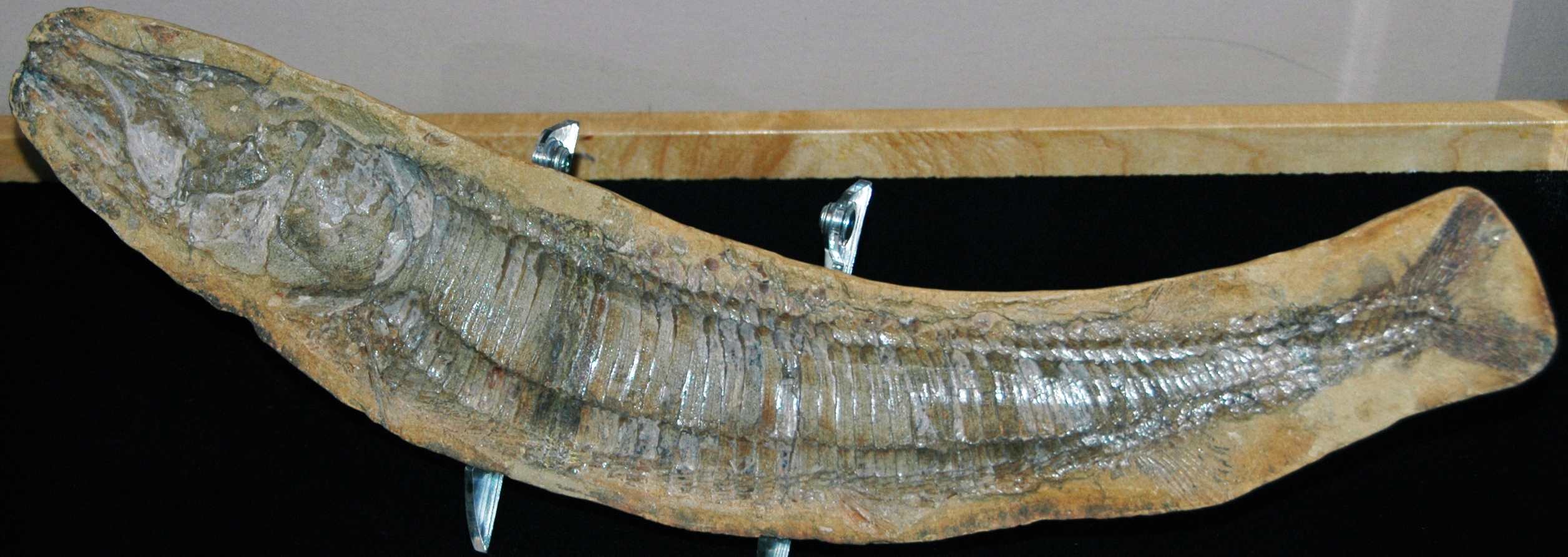
- Vinctifer comptoni, an aspidorhynchiform

Scientific classification
- Kingdom: Animalia
- Phylum: Chordata
- Class: Actinopterygii
- Subclass: Neopterygii
- Infraclass: Teleosteomorpha; Arratia, 2001

Subgroups
- †Aspidorhynchiformes; †Pachycormiformes; †Pholidophoridae; †Dorsetichthys; †Leptolepidae; †Ichthyodectiformes; Teleostei (crown group); Others, see text

= Teleosteomorpha =

Teleosteomorphs Temporal range: Middle Triassic–present

Infraclass of fishes

Teleosteomorpha is an infraclass of ray-finned fishes containing all teleost fish and their closest extinct relatives. Also in this group are two diverse Mesozoic fish orders, the Aspidorhynchiformes and the Pachycormiformes. Several other non-teleostomorph teleosteans existed throughout the Mesozoic, although not as dominant as the two main clades in the group.

Shared morphological features of this group include a autosphenotic bone lacking a dermal component, the lack of a canal bearing part of the antorbital bone, the lack of vertebral centra fused into the occipital condyle in adult individuals, and each hypural (caudal fin support) being articulated with caudal rays.

The oldest known teleosteomorph is Prohalecites from the Triassic of Italy. The last surviving non-teleostean teleosteomorph was Belonostomus, which survived into the Late Paleocene.

== Taxonomy ==
Cladogram of Teleosteomorpha after Sferco et al. 2015:

- Holostei
- Teleosteomorpha (Teleostei total group)
  - Pachycormiformes
  - - Aspidorhynchiformes
    - Mesturus
    - - Pholidophoridae
      - - Siemensichythys
        - - Dorsetichthys
          - - Eurycormus
            - - Leptolepidae
              - - Luisiellidae
                - - Tharsis dubius
                  - - Varasichthyidae
                    - - Ascalabos
                      - - Ichthyodectiformes
                        - Teleostei crown group (including Crossognathiformes)

The cladogram below is simplified after a phylogenetic analysis by Bean (2021).

- Teleosteomorpha
  - Pachycormidae
  - - Aspidorhynchidae
    - Teleostei
      - Archaeomaenidae
      - - Pholidophoridae
        - - Prohalecites
          - - Eurycormus
            - - Ankylophoridae
              - - Ichthyokentema
                - - Dorsetichthys
                  - - Leptolepis
                    - - Ascalaboidae
                      - - Varasichthyidae
                        - Crown group Teleostei

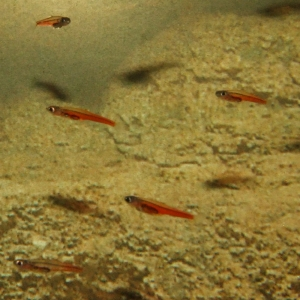

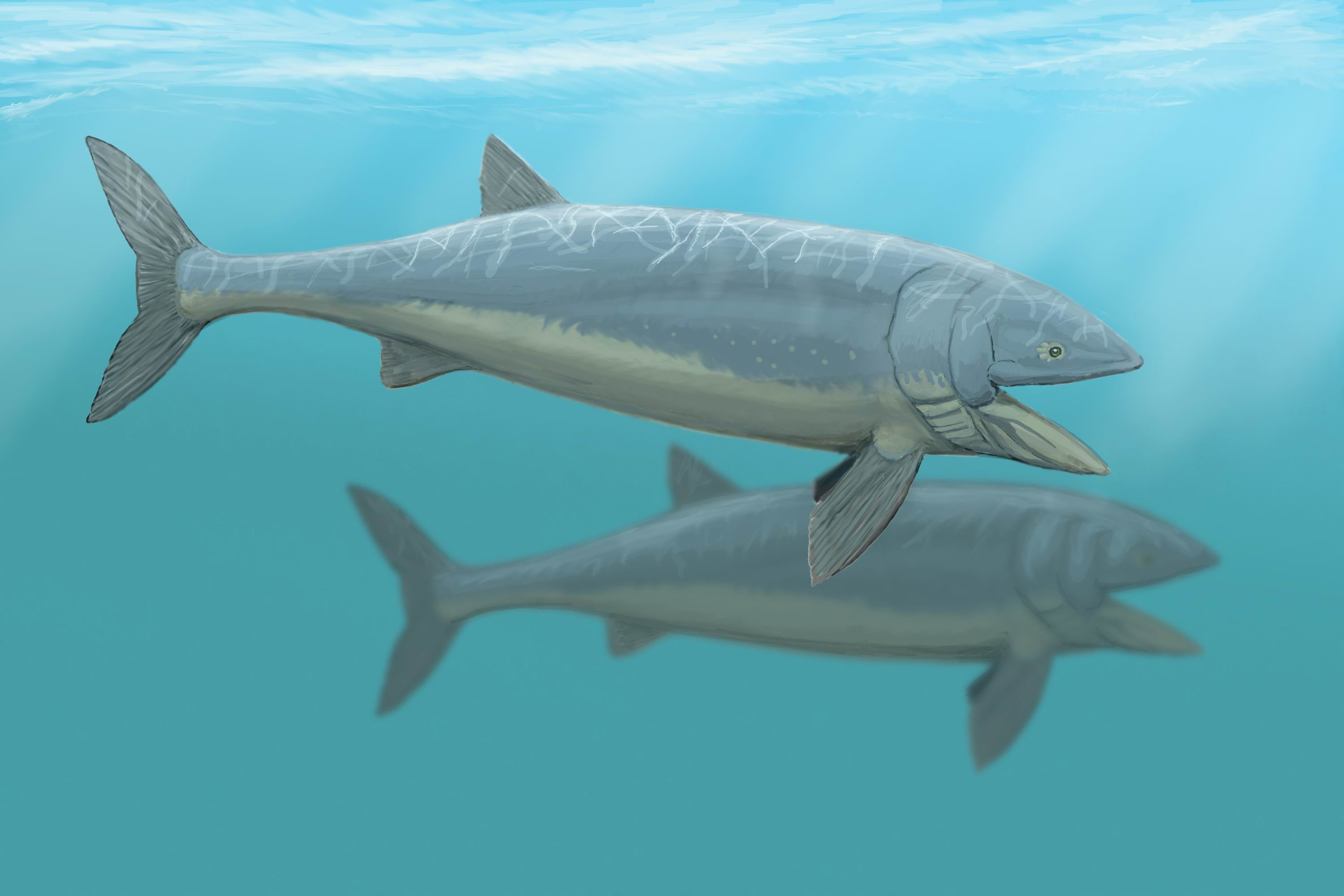
Teleosteomorpha contains both the smallest (Paedocypris progenetica, above) and the largest (Leedsichthys problematicus, below) known ray-finned fish to have ever existed.

Where applicable, taxonomic order is based on Eschmeyer's Catalog of Fishes:

- Infraclass Teleosteomorpha
  - Genus †Ruedersdorfia
  - Genus †Seinstedtia
  - Family †Atacamichthyidae
  - Family †Barschichthyidae
  - Family †Ichthyokentemidae
  - Family †Marcopoloichthyidae
  - Order †Prohaleciteiformes
  - Division †Aspidorhynchei (Early Jurassic to Paleocene, not always found to be monophyletic)
    - Order †Aspidorhynchiformes
    - Order †Pachycormiformes
  - Division Teleostei (Middle Triassic to present)
    - Family †Archaeomaenidae
    - Family †Koonwarriidae
    - Family †Luisiellidae
    - Family †Pleuropholidae
    - Family †Siyuichthyidae
    - Family †Varasichthyidae
    - Order †Ankylophoriformes
    - Order †?Araripichthyiformes
    - Order †Ascalaboidiformes
    - Order †Catervarioliformes
    - Order †?Ligulelliiformes
    - Order †Pholidophoriformes
    - Order †Dorsetichthyiformes
    - Order †Leptolepidiformes
    - Order †Ichthyodectiformes
    - Supercohort Teleocephala
      - Order †Crossognathiformes (excluding Varasichthyidae)
      - Cohort Elopomorpha
        - Order Elopiformes, including the ladyfishes and tarpon
        - Order Albuliformes, the bonefishes
        - Order Notacanthiformes, including the halosaurs and spiny eels
        - Order Anguilliformes, the true eels
      - Clade Osteoglossocephala
        - Cohort Osteoglossomorpha
          - Order †Lycopteriformes
          - Order Osteoglossiformes, the bony-tongued fishes
          - Order Hiodontiformes, including the mooneye and goldeye
        - Clade Clupeocephala
          - Family †Orthogonikleithridae
          - Order †Tselfatiiformes
          - Cohort Otocephala
            - Superorder Clupeomorpha
              - Order †Ellimmichthyiformes
              - Order Clupeiformes, including herrings and anchovies
            - Superorder Ostariophysi
              - Order †Sorbininardiformes
              - Order Gonorynchiformes, including the milkfishes
              - Order Cypriniformes, including barbs, carp, danios, goldfishes, loaches, minnows, rasboras
              - Order Characiformes, including characins, pencilfishes, hatchetfishes, piranhas, tetras.
              - Order Gymnotiformes, including electric eels and knifefishes
              - Order Siluriformes, the catfishes
          - Cohort Euteleostei
            - Order Lepidogalaxiiformes, the salamanderfish
            - Order Salmoniformes, including salmon, Arctic char, and trout
            - Order Argentiniformes, including the barreleyes and slickheads (formerly in Osmeriformes)
            - Order Galaxiiformes, the galaxiids
            - Order Osmeriformes, including the smelts
            - Order Stomiiformes, including the bristlemouths and marine hatchetfishes
            - Clade Neoteleostei
              - Superorder Ateleopodomorpha
                - Order Ateleopodiformes, the jellynose fish
              - Clade Eurypterygii
                - Superorder Cyclosquamata
                  - Order Aulopiformes, including the Bombay duck, tripod fish, and lancetfishes
                - Clade Ctenosquamata
                  - Superorder Scopelomorpha
                    - Order Myctophiformes, including the lanternfishes
                  - Clade Acanthomorpha
                    - Order †Ctenothrissiformes
                    - Superorder Lampridiomorpha
                      - Order Lampriformes, including the oarfish, opah and ribbonfishes
                    - Clade Euacanthomorpha
                      - Superorder Paracanthopterygii
                        - Order Polymixiiformes, the beardfishes
                        - Order †Sphenocephaliformes
                        - Order Percopsiformes, including the cavefishes and trout-perches
                        - Order Zeiformes, including the dories
                        - Order Gadiformes, including cods
                      - Superorder Acanthopterygii
                        - Order Trachichthyiformes, including slimeheads and fangtooths
                        - Order Beryciformes, including alfonsinos and pineconefishes
                        - Series Percomorpha
                          - Order Ophidiiformes, including the pearlfishes and cusk-eels
                          - Order Batrachoidiformes, the toadfishes
                          - Order Gobiiformes, including the gobies and cardinalfishes
                          - Subseries Anabantaria
                            - Order Synbranchiformes, including the swamp eels
                            - Order Anabantiformes, including gouramis and snakeheads
                          - Order Scombriformes, including mackerel and tunas
                          - Order Syngnathiformes, including the seahorses and pipefishes
                          - Order Carangiformes, including the jacks, billfishes, barracudas and flatfishes
                          - Subseries Ovalentaria
                            - Order Atheriniformes, including silversides and rainbowfishes
                            - Order Beloniformes, including the flyingfishes and needlefishes
                            - Order Cyprinodontiformes, including live-bearers, killifishes
                            - Order Mugiliformes, the mullets and glassfishes
                            - Order Cichliformes, the cichlids and convict blenny
                            - Order Blenniiformes, the blennies, damselfishes and clingfishes
                          - Subseries Eupercaria
                            - Order Perciformes, including perches, groupers, scorpionfishes and sculpins
                            - Order Centrarchiformes, including the freshwater sunfishes, hawkfishes and sea chubs
                            - Order Labriformes, including wrasses, parrotfishes and stargazers
                            - Order Acropomatiformes, including the sweepers, lanternbellies, wreckfish and banjofish
                            - Order Acanthuriformes, including drums, surgeonfishes, Moorish idols, butterflyfishes, angelfishes, temperate basses, spadefishes and others
                            - Order Lophiiformes, including the anglerfishes
                            - Order Tetraodontiformes, including the sunfish, filefishes and pufferfish
