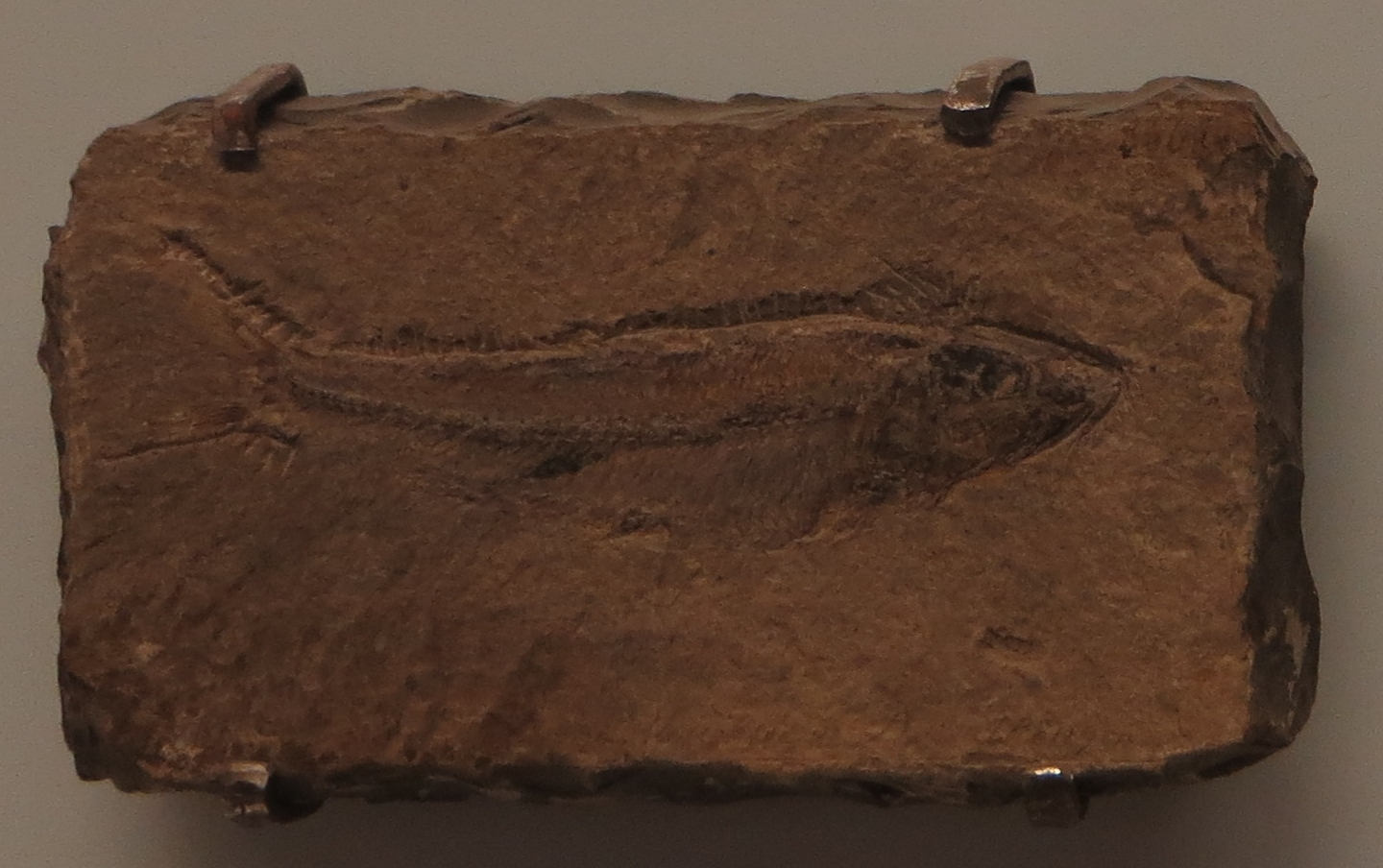
- Fossil specimen of L. coryphaenoides, State Museum of Natural History Stuttgart

Scientific classification
- Kingdom: Animalia
- Phylum: Chordata
- Class: Actinopterygii
- Stem group: Teleostei
- Order: †Leptolepiformes
- Family: †Leptolepidae
- Genus: †Leptolepis; Agassiz, 1832

Type species
- †Cyprinus coryphaenoides Bronn, 1830

Species
- See text

= Leptolepis =

Leptolepis Temporal range: Early to Middle Jurassic (Pliensbachian to Callovian) Potential Oxfordian to Hauterivian records

Extinct genus of ray-finned fishes

Leptolepis (from Greek: λεπτός leptós, 'slight' and Greek: λεπίς lepis 'scale') is an extinct genus of stem-teleost fish that lived throughout much of what is now Europe during the early to middle Jurassic period (Toarcian to Callovian stages, with otolith records from the earlier Pliensbachian, and potentially as late as the Hauterivian). It was a small schooling fish, and one of the most abundant fish in Upper Lias deposits from the early-mid Jurassic of Europe.

== Taxonomy ==
Fossil specimen of L. autissiodorensis

For over a century, the genus Leptolepis was used as a wastebasket taxon for various small, unspecialised teleosts that did not form a natural clade. In 1974 the Swedish ichthyologist Orvar Nybelin revised the genus, restricting it to seven species from the Early to Middle Jurassic of Europe. Other species were reassigned to different genera.

The following definitive species are known from body fossils:

- L. autissiodorensis Sauvage, 1892 - Early Jurassic (Toarcian) of France (Yonne)
- L. coryphaenoides (Bronn, 1830) (type species) - Toarcian of Germany (Posidonia Shale, Grimmen Formation & others), France (Normandy), England (Whitby Mudstone), Italy (Calcare di Sogno), potentially Toarcian of Greece (Lefkada Island) (=L. bronni Agassiz, 1832)
- L. jaegeri Agassiz, 1832 - Toarcian of Germany (Posidonia Shale & Grimmen Formation), France (Normandy), potentially England (Whitby Mudstone)
- L. nathorsti Woodward, 1900 - Toarcian of Svalbard (Agardhfjellet Formation of Spitsbergen)
- L. normandica Nybelin, 1962 - Early Jurassic (Pliensbachian) of Germany (Amaltheenton Formation, otoliths only), Toarcian of France (Normandy), England (Whitby Mudstone Formation), Luxembourg (Schistes bitumineux, otoliths & body fossils) & Germany (Grimmen Formation and potentially Posidonia Shale),Aalenian of Germany (otoliths only)
- L. saltviciensis Simpson, 1855 - Toarcian of England (Whitby Mudstone) (potentially synonymous with L. autissiodorensis)
- L. woodwardi Nybelin, 1974 - Middle Jurassic (Bathonian) of England (Stonesfield Slate)

Alleged records of Leptolepis have been made from Australia, Africa, North America and South America, but more recently all of these have been reclassified into other genera (i.e. Cavenderichthys, Paraclupavus, Pholidolepis, Pseudoleptolepis, Todiltia) or found to not be referable to Leptolepis. Other Late Jurassic fish from Europe initially classified into Leptolepis have been reclassified into other genera such as Leptolepides.

=== Otolith taxa ===
Leptolepis is one of the earliest known fish for which the otolith morphology is definitively known, as well-preserved specimens of L. normandica from the Bascharage Lagerstätte of the Schistes bitumineux in Luxembourg were preserved with in situ otoliths. These otoliths have been used as a reference to identify multiple other Leptolepis otoliths in early to middle Jurassic-aged formations across Europe, and some as early as the Early Cretaceous. Many of these Leptolepis otoliths have been described as their own species due to their distinct morphology, representing among the oldest known otolith-based fish taxa. However, comparisons of Leptolepis otoliths to those of Cavenderichthys (the other Jurassic fish with definitive otoliths) suggest that early teleost otoliths had a standardized morphology with little variation between genera, so any classification to a genus should be considered tentative.

The following otolith-based species are known:

- L. buttenheimensis Schwarzhans & Keupp, 2022 - Early Jurassic (Pliensbachian) of Germany (Amaltheenton Formation)
- L. curvisulcatus (Schröder, 1956) - Early Jurassic (Toarcian) to Middle Jurassic (Aalenian) of Germany
- L. densus Stinton, 1968 - Middle Jurassic (Bathonian) of England & Scotland (Lealt Shale)
- L. flexuosus Schwarzhans & Wakefield, 2024 [otolith] - Bathonian of Scotland (Lealt Shale)
- L. inaequalis (Weiler, 1954) - Middle Jurassic (Callovian) to Late Jurassic (Oxfordian) of Germany (Kandern Formation)
- L. kremmeldorfensis (Schröder, 1956) - Toarcian to Aalenian of Germany, potentially Pliensbachian of Germany (Amaltheenton Formation)
- L. macrocephalus (Schröder, 1956) - Callovian of Germany
- L. rotundatus (Weiler, 1954) - Bathonian of Germany & Scotland (Lealt Shale)
- L. skyensis Schwarzhans & Wakefield, 2024 - Bathonian of Scotland (Lealt Shale)
- L. steberae Schwarzhans & Keupp, 2022 - Pliensbachian of Germany (Amaltheenton Formation)
- L. toyei Sutherland et al., 2017 - Early Cretaceous (Hauterivian) of England (Weald Formation)
- L. wealdensis Sutherland et al., 2017 - Hauterivian of England (Weald Formation)

=== Species formerly placed in Leptolepis ===
- Leptolepis talbragarensis Woodward, 1895 (Now referred to Cavenderichthys)
- Leptolepis koonwarri Waldman, 1971 (Now referred to Waldmanichthys)

==== The Morrison cf. Leptolepis ====
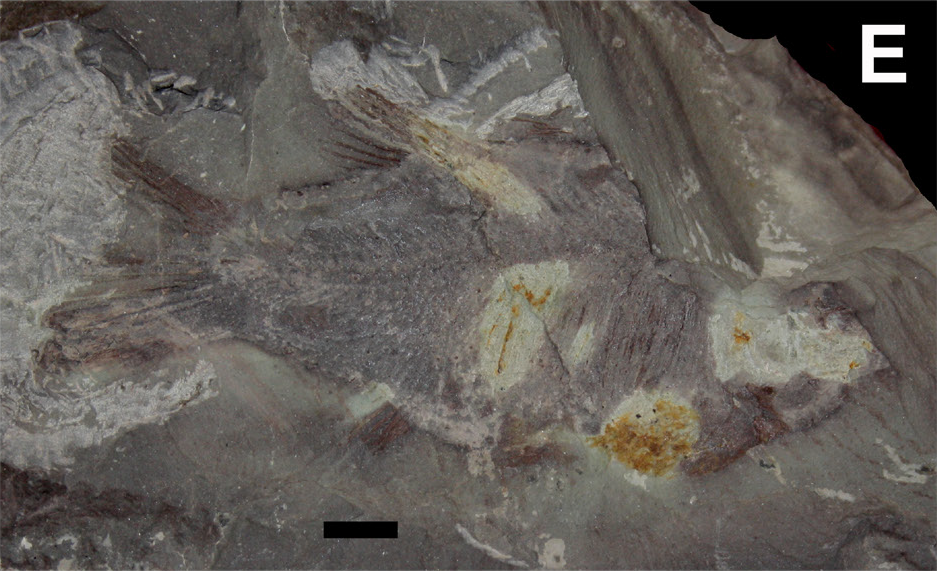
Fossil of teleost cf. Leptolepis from Morrison Formation

Known only from a single nearly complete skeleton found in Morrison Formation, at Rabbit Valley, Colorado. A 13 centimetres (5 in) fish that was deeper bodied than its co-occurring contemporaries Morrolepis and "Hulettia". The Morrison cf. Leptolepis probably had a live mass of about 37 grams (1.3 oz). It is the only teleost fish known from the formation and was morphologically more highly derived than other Morrison fish. A specific example of apomorphy in cf. Leptolepis is its "more modern tail structure" compared to Morrolepis. It is believed to have fed on fish and small invertebrates.

=== Classification ===
Cladogram of Teleosteomorpha after Sferco et al. 2015:

- Holostei
- Teleostei total group (Teleosteomorpha)
  - Pachycormiformes
  - - Aspidorhynchiformes
    - Mesturus
    - - Pholidophoridae
      - - Siemensichythys
        - - Dorsetichthys
          - - Eurycormus
            - - Leptolepis coryphaenoides
              - - Luisiellidae
                - - Tharsis dubius
                  - - Varasichthyidae
                    - - Ascalabos
                      - - Ichthyodectiformes
                        - Teleostei crown group (including Crossognathiformes)

== Appearance ==
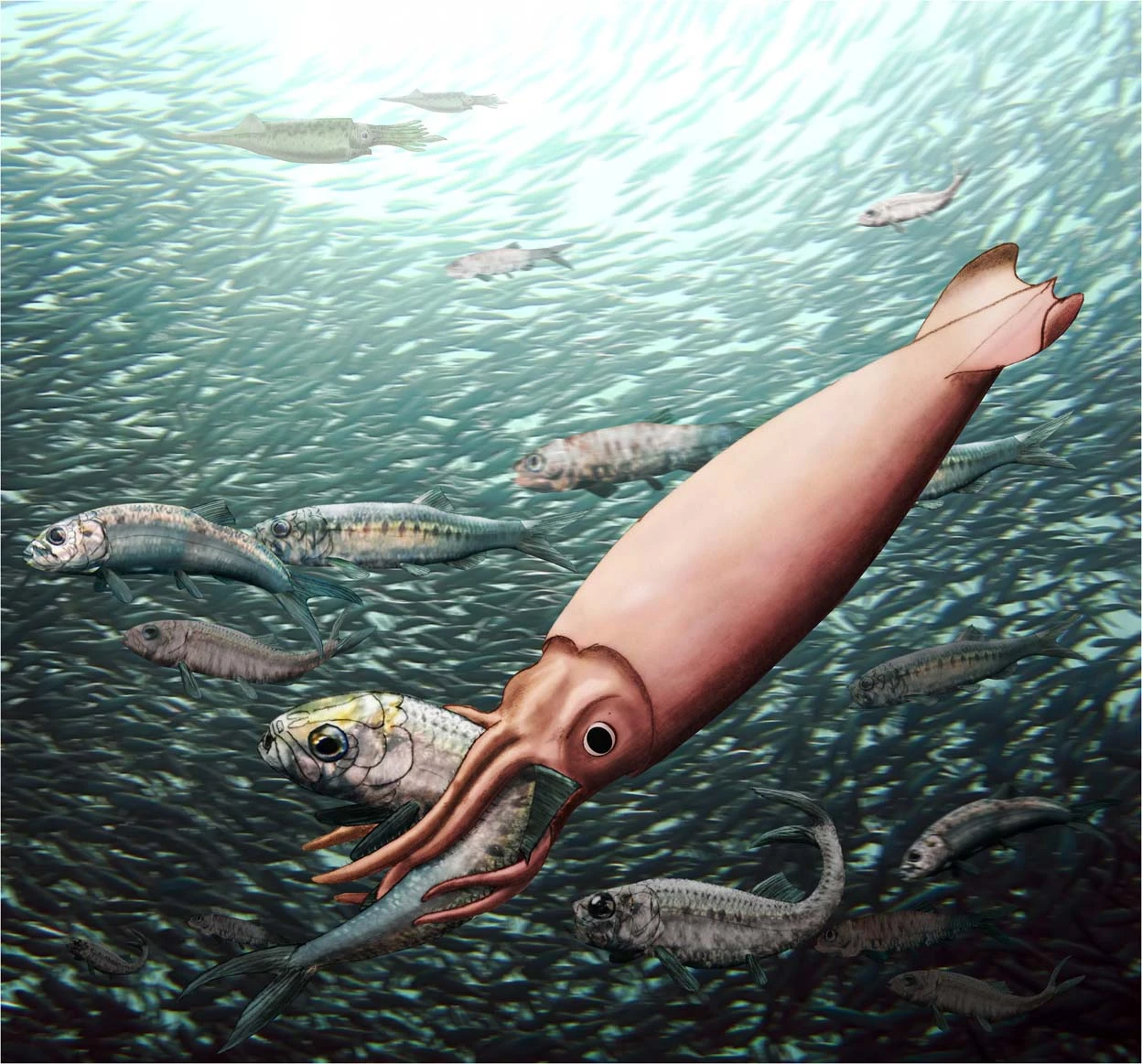
Reconstruction of Leptolepis being predated by Clarkeiteuthis

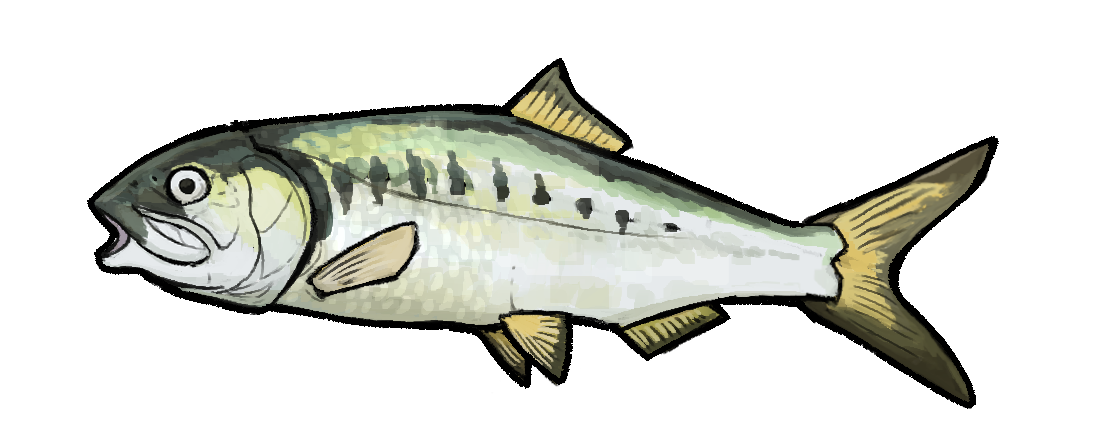
Restoration of Leptolepis coryphaenoides

Length of Leptolepis was about 8.5 centimetres (3.3 in) long, and superficially resembled the unrelated modern herring. While more basal teleosts such as Pholidophorus had skeletons composed of a mixture of bone and cartilage, Leptolepis resembled modern teleosts in possessing a skeleton completely made of bone. Another modern development in Leptolepis were its cycloid scales, which lacked the covering of ganoine present in more basal teleosts. These two developments made swimming easier, as the bony spine was now more resistant to the pressure caused by the S movements made while swimming.

Mass graves of Leptolepis have indicated that species probably lived in schools which would provide some protection from predators while the creatures fed on surface plankton. Pelagosaurus was a known predator of Leptolepis, as a Pelagosaurus fossil was found with Leptolepis remains in its stomach. Clarkeiteuthis is known from three specimens with Leptolepis in its arms, which estimate that Leptolepis is probably most common prey of Clarkeiteuthis. The Pterosaur Dorygnathus preserves remains of Leptolepis in its stomach.

== Bibliography ==
- Silva Santos, R. (1958) - Leptolepis diasii, novo peixe fossil da Serra do Araripe, Brasil”. Boletim da Divisa˜o de Geologia e Mineralogia do Departamento Nacional de Produc¸a˜o Mineral, Notas Preliminares, Brazil 108, 1–15. o, Kiadó: Departamento Nacional de Produc¸a˜o Mineral.
- Maisey, J.. Santana fossils, an illustrated atlas. Neptune City, New Jersey, USA: T.F.H. Publications (1991)
- Silva Santos, R. (1995) - Santanichthys, novo epı´teto gene´rico para Leptolepis diasii Silva Santos, 1958 (Pisces, Teleostei) da Formac¸a˜o Santana (Aptiano), Bacia do Araripe, NE do Brasil”. Anais da Academia Brasileira de Cieˆncias, Brazil 67, 249–258. o, Kiadó: Academia Brasileira de Cieˆncias.
- Filleul, Arnaud, John G. Maisey (2004) - Redescription of Santanichthys diasii (Otophysi, Characiformes) from the Albian of the Santana Formation and Comments on Its Implications for Otophysan Relationships”. American Museum Novitates, New York, NY, USA 3455, American Museum of Natural History
