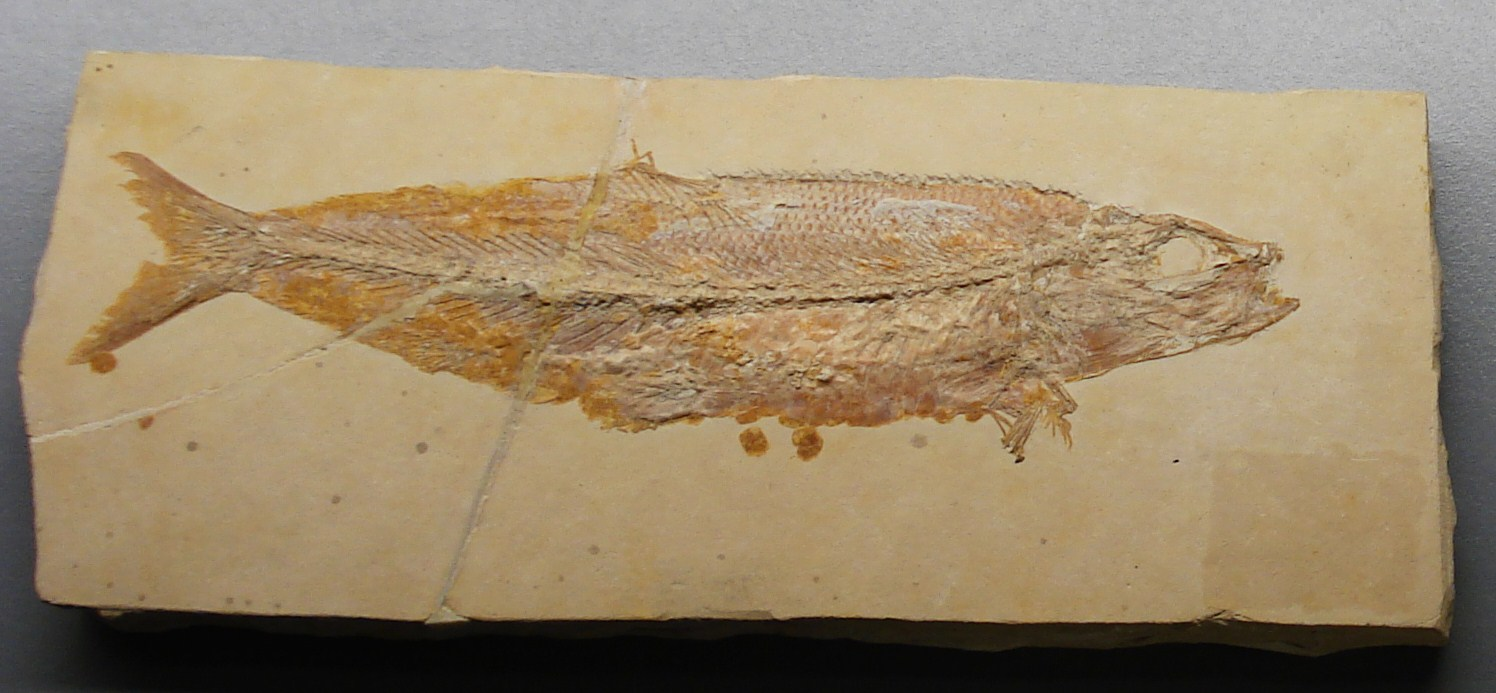
- Specimen of Tharsis dubius

Scientific classification
- Kingdom: Animalia
- Phylum: Chordata
- Class: Actinopterygii
- Division: Teleostei
- Order: †Ascalaboidiformes
- Family: †Ascalaboidae
- Genus: †Tharsis; Giebel, 1848

Type species
- †Leptolepis dubius Blainville, 1818

Other species
- †T. elleri Arratia, Schultze and Tischlinger, 2019

= Tharsis (fish) =

Tharsis Temporal range: Tithonian

Extinct genus of fishes

Tharsis is an extinct genus of marine ray-finned fish known from the Late Jurassic Solnhofen Limestone of Germany. The genus contains two species, T. dubius and T. elleri.

Adult individuals reached about 27 centimetres (11 in) in length, with the jaws having minute teeth. They are thought to have been micro-carnivores/visual zooplanktivores, selectively feeding on small sized prey that was engulfed via suction. In 2025, Ebert and Kölbl-Ebert reported the discovery of specimens of Tharsis found with belemnites lodged in their mouth and gill apparatus, and interpreted them as sucking remnants of belemnite soft tissue of algal or bacterial overgrowth after accidentally sucking belemnites into their mouth, which likely resulted in suffocation.

Tharsis belongs to the extinct family Ascalaboidae and order Ascalaboidiformes, which are closely related to modern teleosts but outside the crown group (the descendants of the last common ancestor of all living species). Cladogram after Bean (2021).

- Teleosteomorpha
  - Pachycormidae
  - - Aspidorhynchidae
    - Teleostei
      - Archaeomaenidae
      - - Pholidophoridae
        - - Prohalecites
          - - Eurycormus
            - - Ankylophoridae
              - - Ichthyokentema
                - - Dorsetichthys
                  - - Leptolepis
                    - - Ascalaboidae
                        - Tharsis
                        - - Ascalabos
                          - Ebertichthys
                      - - Varasichthyidae
                        - Crown group Teleostei
