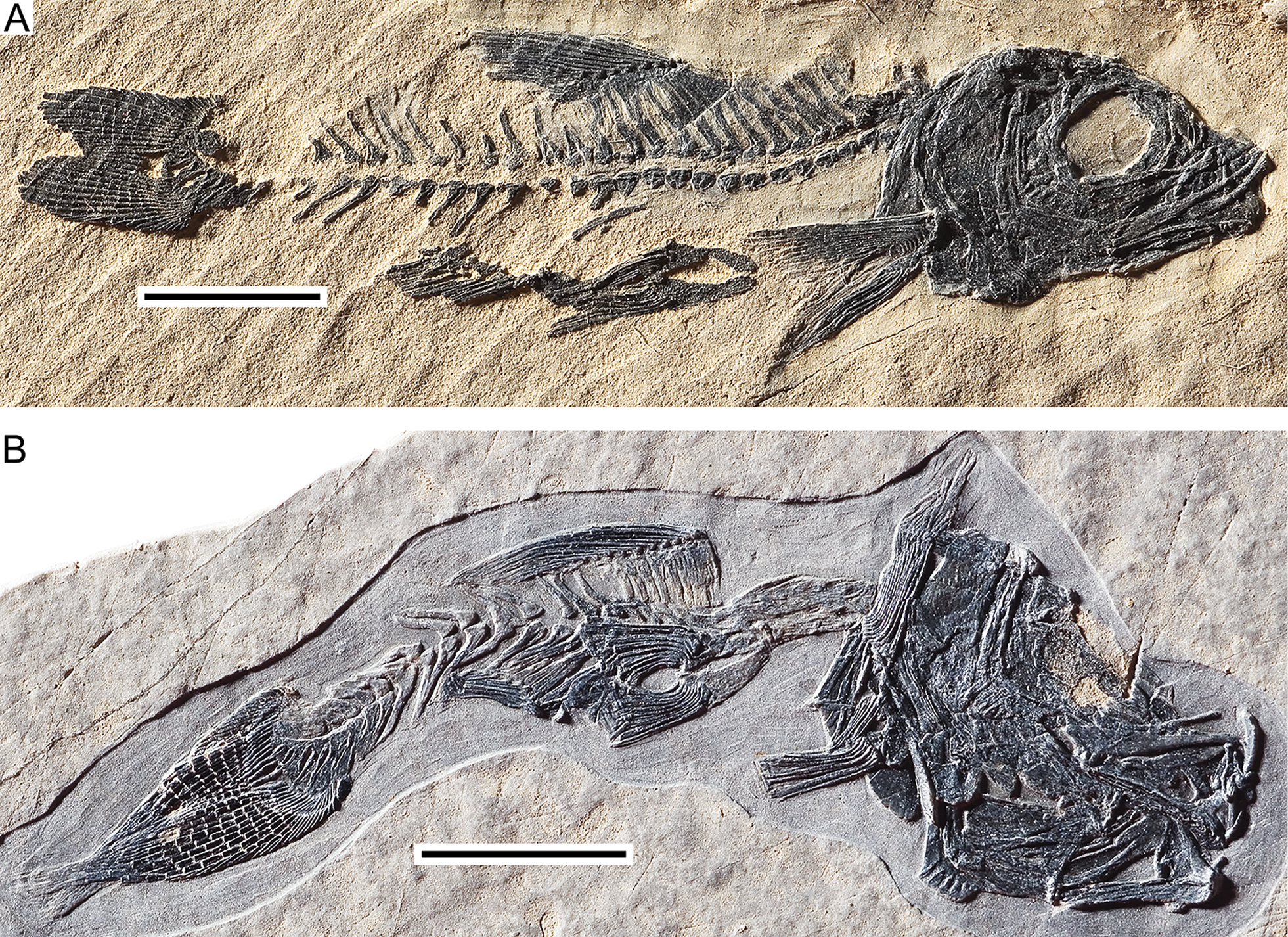
- Specimens of M. furreri

Scientific classification
- Domain: Eukaryota
- Kingdom: Animalia
- Phylum: Chordata
- Class: Actinopterygii
- Infraclass: Teleosteomorpha
- Family: †Marcopoloichthyidae; Tintori et al, 2007
- Genus: †Marcopoloichthys; Tintori, Sun, Lombardo, Jiang, Sun, Rusconi & Hao, 2007

Species
- M. ani Tintori et al, 2007; M. andreetti Tintori et al, 2007; M. faccii (Gortani, 1907); M. furreri Arratia, 2022; M. mirigioliensis Arratia et al, 2024

= Marcopoloichthys =

Marcopoloichthys Temporal range: Middle Triassic–Late Triassic

Extinct genus of fishes

Marcopoloichthys is an extinct genus of marine teleosteomorph ray-finned fish known from the Middle and Late Triassic of the former Tethys Ocean (Italy, Switzerland, and China). It is the only genus in the family Marcopoloichthyidae. It was originally described based on specimens from both Italy and China, hence the name Marcopoloichthys, which references the medieval Venetian merchant Marco Polo, who traveled from Italy to China.

Five species are known:

- M. ani Tintori et al., 2007 – Anisian of Yunnan, China. (type species)
- M. andreetti Tintori et al., 2007 – Ladinian of Lombardy, Italy.
- M. faccii (Gortani, 1907) – Carnian of Friuli-Venezia Giulia, Italy (initially described as Pholidophorus faccii)
- M. furreri Arratia, 2022 – Ladinian of Grisons, Switzerland
- M. mirigioliensis Arratia et al., 2024 – late Anisian of the Besano Formation (Monte San Giorgio, Ticino, Switzerland)

The youngest Marcopoloichthys fossils are of an undescribed species from the Norian of Friuli, Italy.

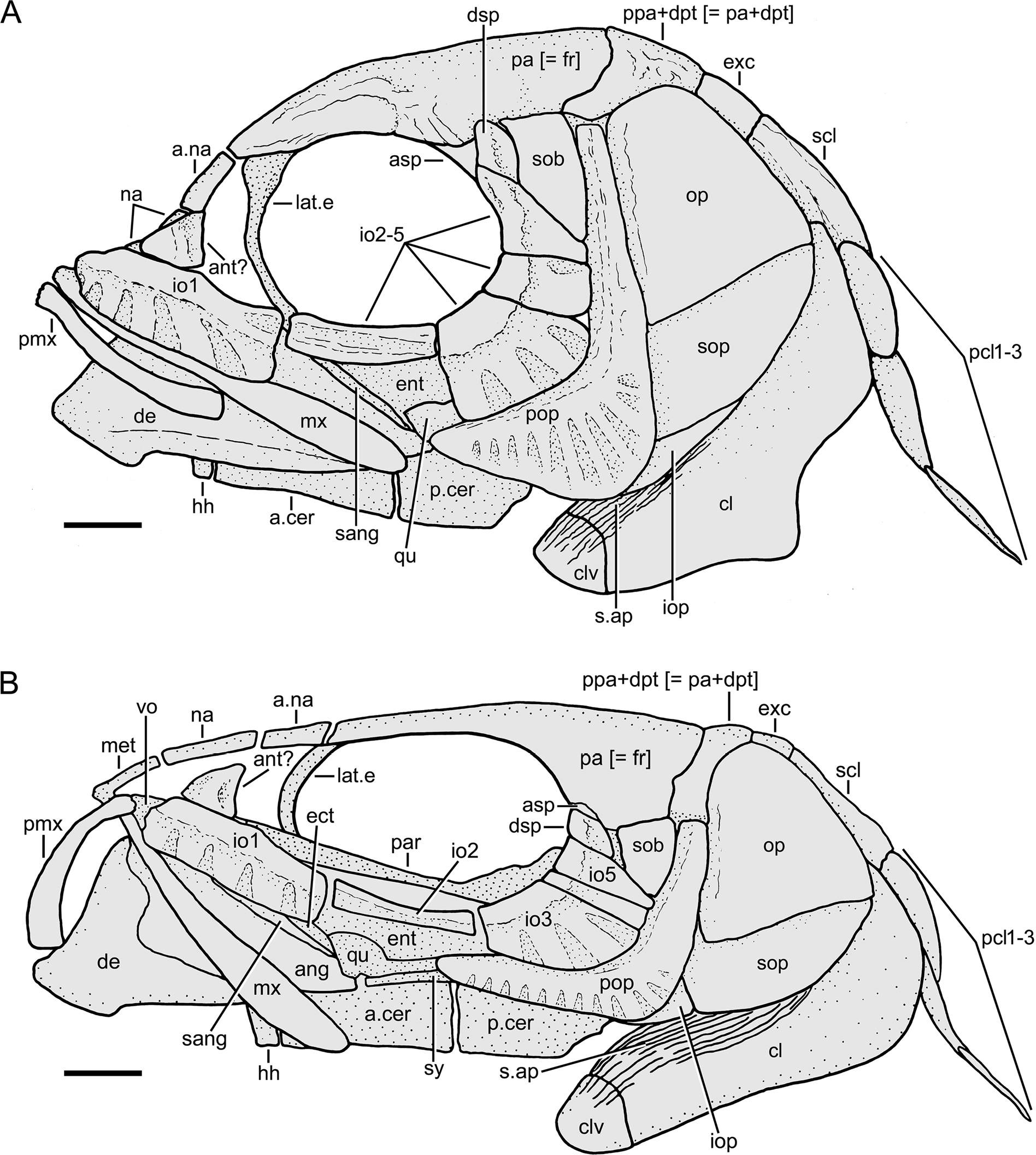
The skull of M. furreri at rest and during feeding, showing the specialized jaws

Marcopoloichthys was a small, scaleless fish with highly specialized, protractile jaws for suction feeding, and a combination of primitive and advanced morphological characters that make it difficult to phylogenetically place. Initially described as an indeterminate basal neopterygian, more recent studies have found it to be a stem-teleost. It somewhat resembles another early teleostomorph, Prohalecites.
