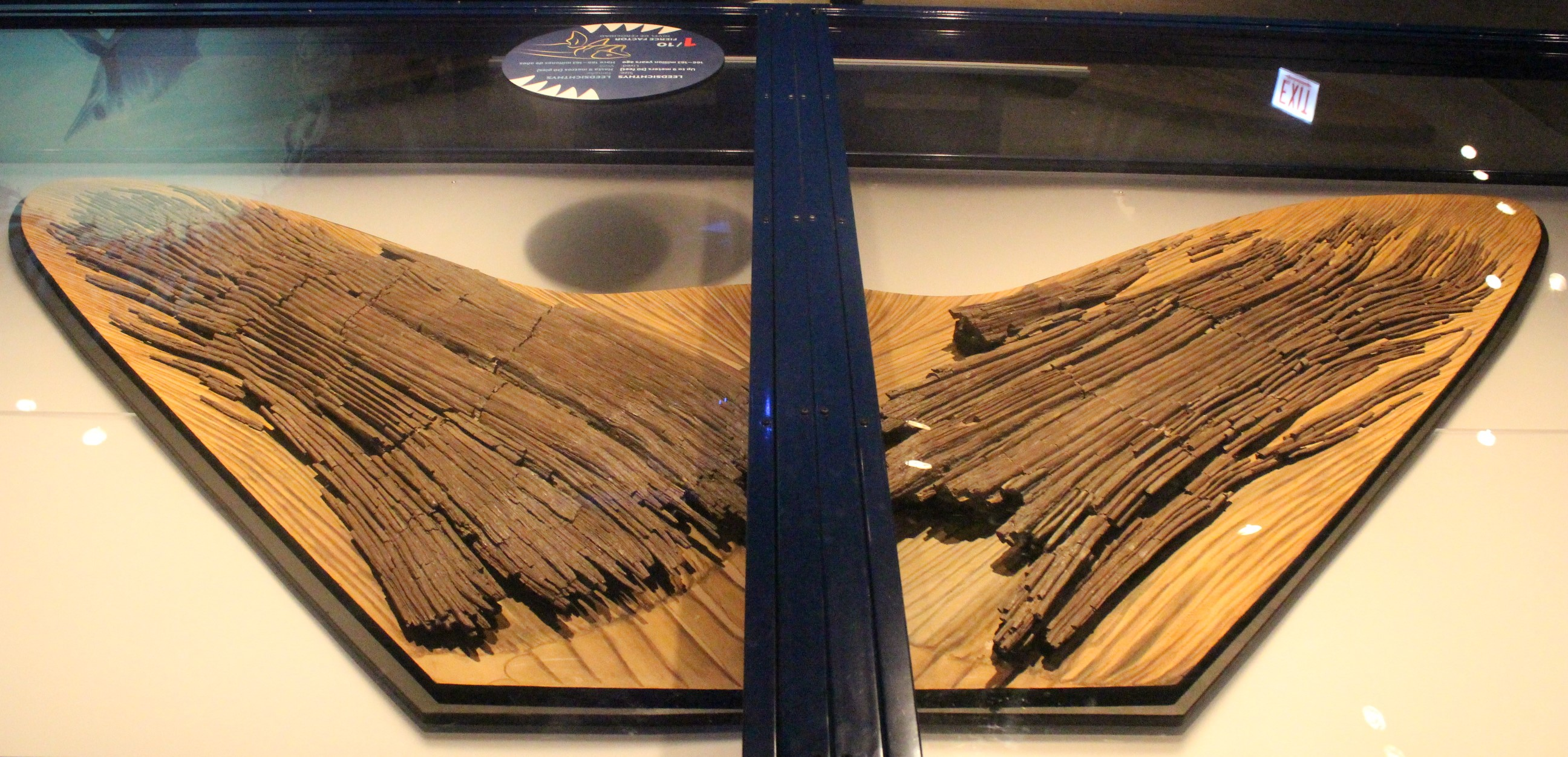
- Fossil tail fin from the Field Museum of Natural History, Chicago

Scientific classification
- Kingdom: Animalia
- Phylum: Chordata
- Class: Actinopterygii
- Order: †Pachycormiformes
- Family: †Pachycormidae
- Subfamily: †Asthenocorminae
- Genus: †Leedsichthys; Woodward, 1889

Type species
- Leedsichthys problematicus Woodward, 1889

Synonyms
- L. notocetes? Martill et al., 1999

= Leedsichthys =

Leedsichthys Temporal range: Callovian-Tithonian ~165–148 Ma

Extinct genus of fishes

Leedsichthys is an extinct genus of pachycormid fish that inhabited the oceans during the Middle to Late Jurassic. It was the largest known ray-finned fish and amongst the largest fish to have ever lived.

The first Leedsichthys remains were identified in the nineteenth century, with significant discoveries made by British fossil collector Alfred Nicholson Leeds. The genus was named in his honor in 1889, with Leedsichthys problematicus designated as the type species. Fossils have been found in England, France, Germany, Argentina and Chile. A second species, Leedsichthys notocetes, was named in 1999 following discoveries in Chile, but was later determined to be indistinguishable from L. problematicus.

Leedsichthys fossils have been difficult to interpret because much of its skeleton consisted of cartilage, which rarely fossilizes. Consequently, some of its large fragmentary remains were initially mistaken for bones belonging to stegosaurian dinosaurs. The absence of preserved vertebrae has also complicated assessments of its total body length. Early twentieth-century estimates suggested a length of 9 m (30 ft), while some later figures proposed that it exceeded 30 m (98 ft). More recent research has placed the maximum length at around 16.5 m (54 ft). Preserved skull bones indicate that Leedsichthys had a large head with prominent bosses on the skull roof. Fossilized fin rays reveal elongated pectoral fins and a tall vertical tail fin. Its gill arches were lined with gill rakers bearing a distinctive arrangement of delicate bony plates, which filtered plankton from water as its primary food source.

Alongside the closely related pachycormids Bonnerichthys and Rhinconichthys, Leedsichthys belongs to a lineage of large filter-feedings fishes that inhabited the Mesozoic seas for more than 100 million years, from the middle Jurassic to the end of the Cretaceous. Pachycormids may represent an early branch of Teleostei, the group that includes most modern bony fishes, making Leedsichthys the largest known teleost fish.

== Discovery and naming ==
Holotype fossils, Natural History Museum, London

During the 1880s, the gentleman farmer Alfred Nicholson Leeds collected large fish fossils from loam pits near Peterborough, England. In May 1886 these were inspected by John Whitaker Hulke, who in 1887 partially reported them as the back plates of the stegosaurian Omosaurus. On 22 August 1888, the American dinosaur expert Professor Othniel Charles Marsh visited Leeds' farm at Eyebury and quickly concluded that the presumed dinosaurian armour in fact represented the skull bones of a giant fish. Within two weeks British fish expert Arthur Smith Woodward examined the specimens and began to prepare a formal description published in 1889. In it he named the species Leedsichthys problematicus. The generic name Leedsichthys means "Leeds' fish", from Greek ἰχθύς, ichthys, "fish". The fossils found by Leeds gave the fish the specific epithet problematicus because the remains were so fragmented that they were extremely hard to recognize and interpret. After a second publication in 1889, objections were raised against the perceived "barbaric" nature of the generic name, which simply attached a non-Latinised British family name to a Classical Greek word. Woodward therefore in 1890 changed the genus name to Leedsia, resulting in a Leedsia problematica. However, by modern standards this is a non-valid junior synonym.

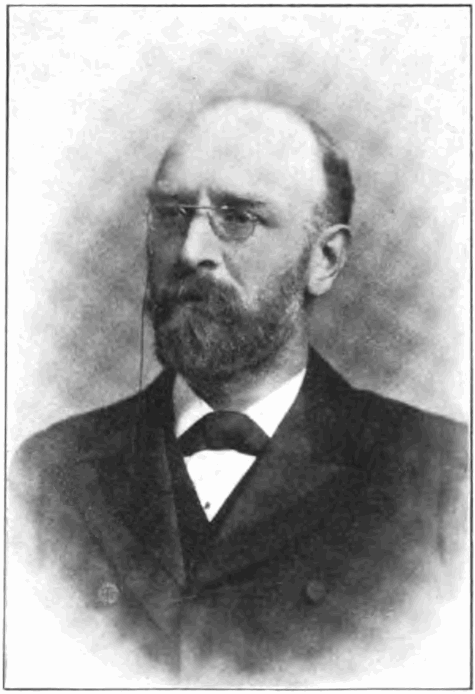
Photo of Arthur Smith Woodward, the describer of Leedsichthys.

The holotype specimen, BMNH P.6921, had been found in a layer of the Oxford Clay Formation dating from the Callovian, about 165 million years old. It consists of 1133 disarticulated elements of the skeleton, mostly fin ray fragments, probably of a single individual. Another specimen, BMNH P.6922, contains additional probable fragmentary remains of Leedsichthys. Woodward also identified a specimen previously acquired from the French collector Tesson, who had in 1857 found them in the Falaises des Vaches Noires of Normandy, BMNH 32581, as the gill rakers of Leedsichthys. Another specimen bought in 1875 from the collection of William Cunnington, BMNH 46355, he failed to recognise.

Leeds continued to collect Leedsichthys fossils that subsequently were acquired by British musea. In March 1898, Leeds reported to have discovered a tail which he on 17 March 1899 sold for £25 to the British Museum of Natural History, which exhibited it as specimen BMNH P.10000; a new inventory number range was begun for the occasion. Already in July 1898, the front of probably the same animal had been bought, BMNH P.11823. On 22 July 1905 specimen BMNH P.10156 was acquired, a gill basket. In January 1915 Leeds sold specimens GLAHM V3362, a pectoral fin, and GLAHM V3363, the remainder of the same skeleton with 904 elements, to the Hunterian Museum, Glasgow.

Leeds had a rival, the collector Henry Keeping, who in 1899 tricked pit workers into selling dorsal fin rays by misinforming them that Leeds had lost interest in such finds. Keeping again sold these to the University of Cambridge where they were catalogued as specimen CAMSM J.46873. In September 1901, they were examined by the German palaeontologist Friedrich von Huene, who identified them as tail spikes, Schwanzstacheln, of Omosaurus, the second time Leedsichthys remains were mistaken for stegosaurian bones; Leeds himself was able to disabuse von Huene the same year.

In 2001, students at the Dogsthorpe Star Pit discovered a major new British specimen that they nicknamed "Ariston" after a 1991 commercial for the Indesit Ariston washing machine that claimed it went "on and on and on". Likewise, the bones of Leedsichthys seemed to endlessly continue into the face of the loam pit. From 2002 until 2004 "Ariston" or specimen PETMG F174 was excavated by a team headed by Jeff Liston; to uncover the remains it was necessary to remove ten thousand tonnes of loam forming an overburden of 15 metres (49 feet) thickness. The find generated considerable media attention, inspiring an episode of the BBC Sea Monsters series, "The Second Most Deadly Sea", and a Channel Four documentary titled The Big Monster Dig, both containing computer-generated animated reconstructions of Leedsichthys. Liston subsequently dedicated a dissertation and a series of articles to Leedsichthys, providing the first extensive modern osteology of the animal.

Apart from the British discoveries, finds of a more fragmentary nature continued to be made in Normandy, France. In July 1982, Germany became an important source of Leedsichthys fossils when two groups of amateur palaeontologists, unaware of each other's activities, began to dig up the same skeleton at Wallücke. Remarkably, parts of it were again incorrectly identified as stegosaurian material, of Lexovisaurus. From 1973 onwards, fragmentary Leedsichthys fossils were uncovered in Chile. In March 1994, a more complete specimen was found, SMNK 2573 PAL. In 1999 the Chilean finds were named as a second species, Leedsichthys notocetes, the "Southern Sea Monster". However, Liston later concluded that the presumed distinguishing traits of this species, depressions on the gill rakers, were artefacts caused by erosion; Leedsichthys notocetes would be a junior synonym of Leedsichthys problematicus.

=== Fossil range ===
The fossil remains of Leedsichthys have been found in the Callovian of England (Oxford Clay) and northern Germany, the Oxfordian of Chile (El Profeta Formation & Cerro Campamento Formation), and the Callovian and upper Kimmeridgian of France (Calcaire de Creully Formation). These occurrences span a temporal range of at least five million years. A complete and isolated gill raker from the Vaca Muerta formation of Argentina (MOZ-Pv 1788), has been assigned to the genus and dates to the early Tithonian.

== Description ==
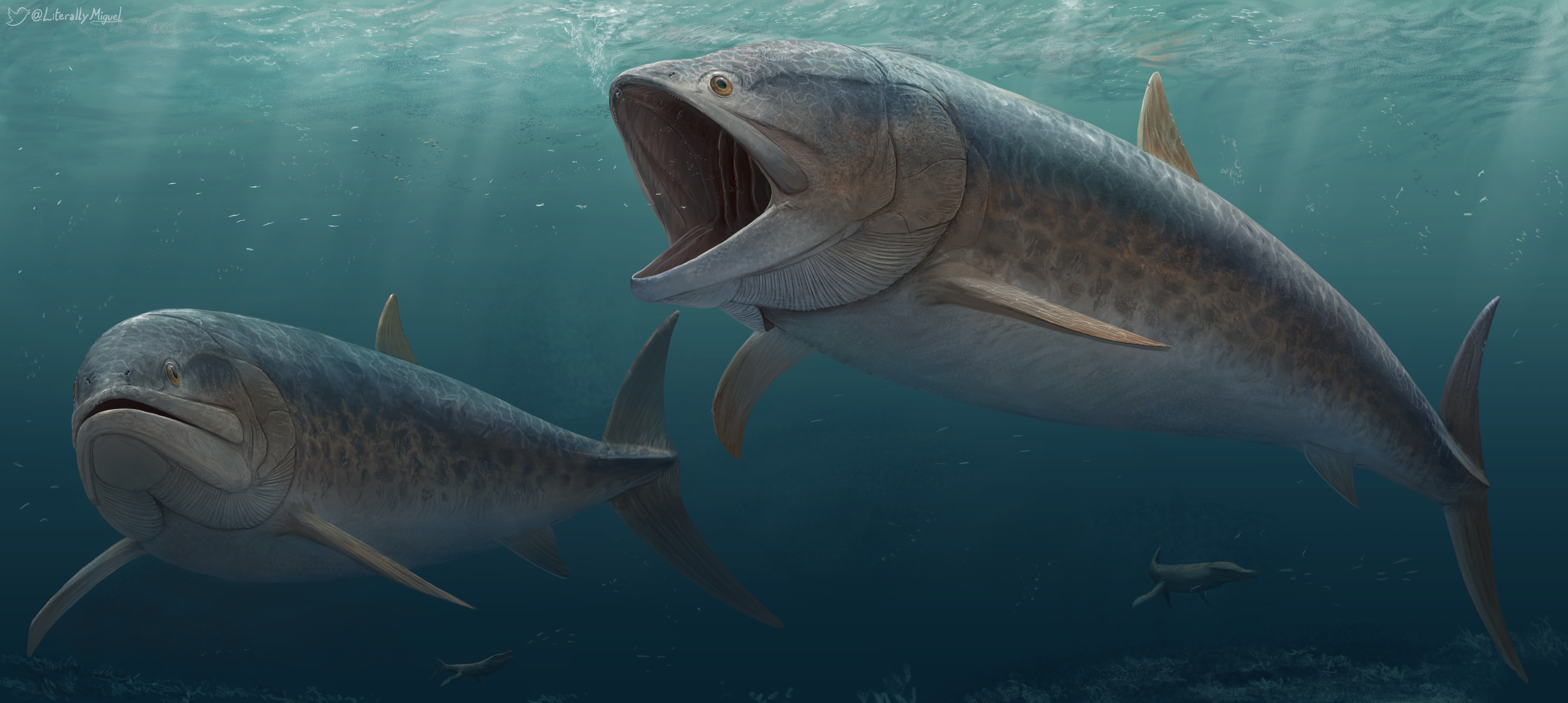
Modern speculative life reconstruction of Leedsichthys aided with pachycormid relatives. While much of the skeleton is known, it's too poorly preserved and difficult to interpret, so its exact appearance cannot be determined with certainty.

Although the remains of over seventy individuals have been found, most of them are partial and fragmentary. The skeleton of Leedsichthys is thus only imperfectly known. This is largely caused by the fact that many skeletal elements, including the front of the skull and the vertebral centra, did not ossify but remained cartilage. Furthermore, those that did ossify were gradually hollowed out during the lifetime of the animal by resorption of the inner bone tissue. In the fossil phase, compression flattened and cracked these hollow structures, making it extraordinarily difficult to identify them or determine their original form.

The head was probably relatively large and wide but still elongated. The snout is completely unknown. Frontal bones are absent. The skull roof is rather robust with bosses on the parietals, continuing sideways over the dermopterotica, and the postparietals. The parietals have a notch on the front midline. A dermosphenoticum is present above the eye socket. The jaws are toothless. Behind the jaw joint a robust hyomandibula is present. The gill basket rests on paired hypohyalia. At least the first two gill arches have ossified hypobranchialia, the lower parts of the gill arch; a third hypobranchiale was likely present. The hypobranchials are attached at their lower ends at an angle of 21.5° via a functional joint that possibly served to increase the gape of the mouth, to about two feet. All five gill arches have ossified ceratobranchialia with a triangular cross-section, the middle sections of the arches. The hypobranchials are fused with their ceratobranchials. The fifth gill arch is fused with the front parts of the basket. Higher epibranchialia and pharyngobranchialia are present but poorly known. The fourth arches are supported by a midline fourth basibranchiale. An ossified operculum is present.

The gill arches are equipped with rows of parallel 3-to-12-centimetre-long (1.2-to-4.7-inch-long) gill rakers, in life probably attached to the ceratobranchials via soft tissue. On the top of each raker one or two rows of dozens of low "teeth" are present. When there are two rows, they are placed on the edges of the upper surface and separated by a deep trough, itself separated from an internal hollow space by a transverse septum. The teeth or "fimbriations" are obliquely directed towards the front and the top. They are grooved at their sides, the striations continuing over the sides of the raker. Detailed study of exquisitely preserved French specimens revealed to Liston that these teeth were, again via soft tissue, each attached to delicate 2-millimetre-long (0.08-inch-long) bony plates, structures that had never before been observed among living or extinct fishes. An earlier hypothesis that the striations would function as sockets for sharp "needle teeth", as with the basking shark, was hereby refuted. The rakers served to filter plankton, the main food supply of Leedsichthys, from the sea water.

Large parts of the Leedsichthys fossils consist of bony finrays. Leedsichthys has two pectoral fins that probably were located rather low on the body. They are large, very elongated—about five times longer than wide—and scythe-like, with a sudden kink at the lower end, curving 10° to the rear. Also a dorsal fin is present, although its position is unknown. Pelvic fins at the belly are lacking; also a pelvic plate is absent. However, there are indications for a small triangular anal fin. The vertical tail fin is very large and symmetrical with paired upper and lower lobes; there is a smaller lobe in the middle protruding between them. The rays are unsegmented lepidotrichia, resulting in a rather stiff structure. They are bifurcated at up to three splitting points along their length, so a proximally single ray may have eight distal ends. A row of bony supraneuralia is present behind the head, at each side of the vertebral column. Uroneuralia at the tail are unknown. No bony scales are present.

=== Size ===
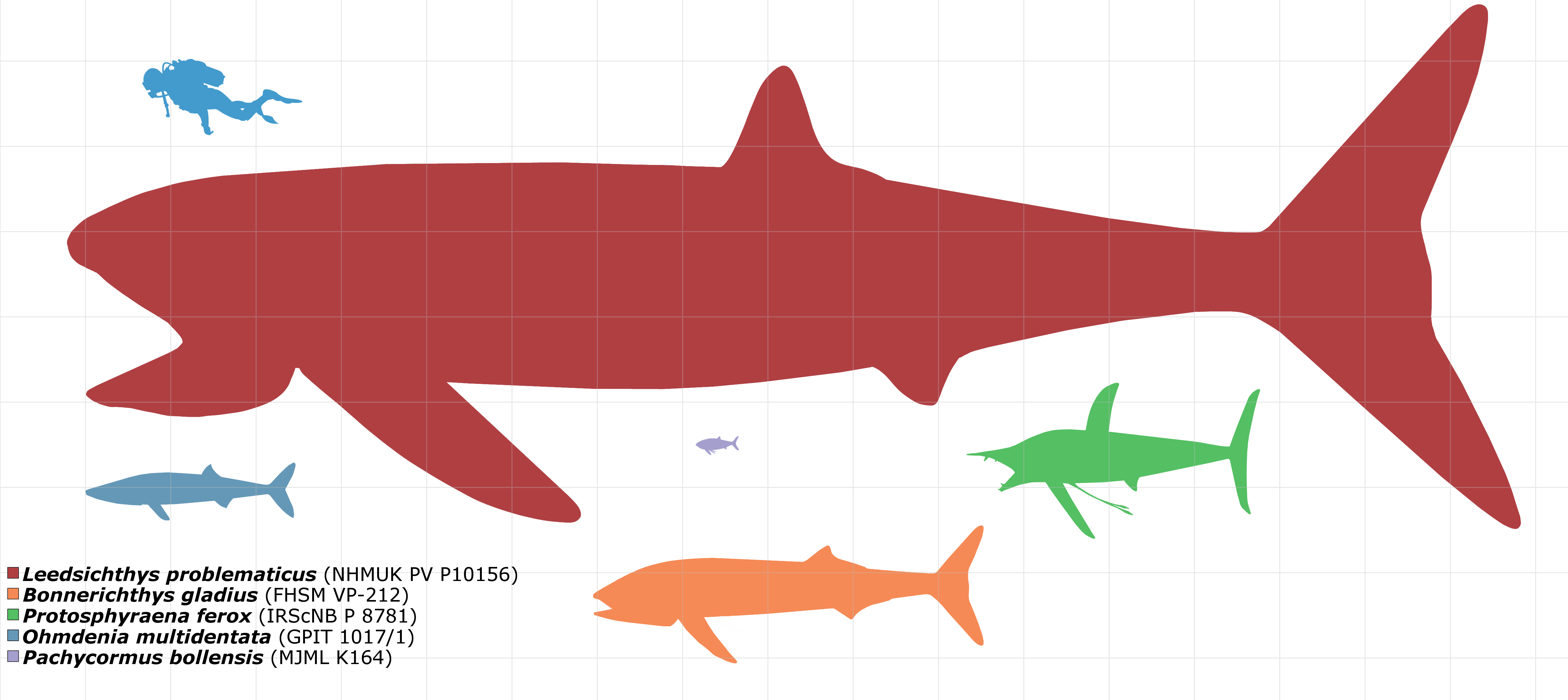
Largest specimen of Leedsichthys compared to other pachycormid fish

Leedsichthys is the largest known member of the Osteichthyes or bony fishes. The heaviest extant bony fish, the giant sunfish (Mola alexandrini), weighs up to 2.7 tonnes, an order of magnitude less than Leedsichthys. The giant oarfish (Regalecus glesne) might rival Leedsichthys in length, but has a much thinner body width. The lack of a preserved vertebral column has made it difficult to estimate the exact length of Leedsichthys. Arthur Smith Woodward, who described the type specimen in 1889, estimated specimen BMNH P.10000 to be of an around nine metre long individual, by comparing this tail of Leedsichthys, having a preserved height of 274 centimetres (8.99 feet), with another pachycormid, Hypsocormus. The length of Leedsichthys was not historically the subject of much attention, the only reference to it being made by Woodward himself when he in 1937 indicated it again as 9 metres (30 feet) on the museum label of BMNH P.10000. However, in 1986, David Martill compared the bones of Leedsichthys to a pachycormid that he had recently discovered, Asthenocormus. The unusual proportions of that specimen gave a wide range of possible sizes. Some were as low as 13.5 metres (44 feet), but extrapolating from the gill basket resulted in an estimated length of 27.6 metres (91 feet) for Leedsichthys specimen NHM P.10156 (the earlier BMNH P.10156). Martill considered the higher estimate as a plausible size of the largest individuals. Subsequently, a length of 30 metres (100 feet) was often mentioned in popular science publications, sometimes one as high as 35 metres (115 feet).

Liston in his studies concluded to much lower estimates. Documentation of historical finds and the excavation of "Ariston", the most complete specimen ever from the Star Pit near Whittlesey, Peterborough, support Woodward's figures of between 9 and 10 metres (30 and 33 ft). With "Ariston" the pectoral fins are 100.5 centimetres (3.30 feet) apart, indicating a narrow body of no excessive size, even though it was initially thought to have been 22 metres (72 feet) long. In 2007 Liston stated that most specimens indicated lengths between 7 and 12 metres (23 and 39 ft). A linear extrapolation from the gill basket would be flawed because the gills grow disproportionally in size, having to increase their surface allometrically to ensure the oxygen supply of a body increasing in volume to the third power. The growth ring structures within the remains of Leedsichthys have indicated that it would have taken 21 to 25 years to reach these lengths, and isolated elements from other specimens showed that a maximum size of just over 16 m (52 ft) is not unreasonable.

In 2013, Liston and colleagues estimated that the age of the five specimens (PETMG F174, NHMUK PV P10000, GLAHM V3363, NHMUK PV P6921 and NHMUK PV P10156) would have ranged between 19 and 40 years old. The largest specimen, NHMUK PV P10156, on the basis of its gill basket with a preserved width of 114 centimetres (3.74 ft) and height of 154.5 centimetres (5.07 ft), would have been 38 years old (two years younger than the holotype NHMUK PV P6921) and measured 16.5 metres (54 ft) long. In 2018, Ferron and colleagues estimated that this specimen would have weighed 44.9 metric tons (49.5 short tons).

== Phylogeny ==
Woodward initially assigned Leedsichthys to the Acipenseroidea, considering it related to the sturgeon, having the large gill rakers and branching finrays in common. In 1905, he changed this to the Pachycormidae. The Pachycormidae have a somewhat uncertain position. Often they are considered very basal Teleostei—if so, Leedsichthys would be the largest known teleost—others see them as members of a Pachycormiformes forming the sister group of the Teleostei, and sometimes they are seen as even more basal Amiiformes. In the latter case the extant bowfin, Amia calva, would be the closest living relative of Leedsichthys.

Within the Pachycormidae, a cladistic analysis found Leedsichthys to be the sister species of Asthenocormus, their clade being the sister group of Martillichthys.

This cladogram after Friedman et al. shows a possible position of Leedsichthys in the evolutionary tree.

- - †Pteronisculus
  - †Discoserra pectinodon
  - - - - †Watsonulus eugnathoides
        - - †Macrepistius rostratus
          - - †Caturus
            - Amia calva
      - - Lepisosteus platostomus
        - - †Macrosemius rostratus
          - - †Semionotus elegans
            - †Lepidotes
    - - - †Pholidophorus bechei
        - - Elops hawaiensis
          - Hiodon alosoides
      - Pachycormidae
        - †Euthynotus
        - - - †Hypsocormus insignis
            - - †"Hypsocormus" tenuirostris
              - - †Orthocormus
                - - †Australopachycormus hurleyi
                  - †Protosphyraena
          - - †Pachycormus
            - - - †Asthenocormus titanius
                - †Martillichthys renwickae
              - - †Bonnerichthys gladius
                - - †Leedsichthys problematicus
                  - †Rhinconichthys taylori

== Paleobiology ==
Like the largest fish today, the whale sharks and basking sharks, Leedsichthys problematicus derived its nutrition as a suspension feeder, using an array of specialised gill rakers lining its gill basket to extract zooplankton, small animals, from the water passing through its mouth and across its gills. It is less clear whether also phytoplankton, algae, were part of the diet. Leedsichthys could have been a ram feeder, making the water pass through its gills by swimming, but could also have actively pumped the water through the gill basket. In 2010, Liston suggested that fossilised furrows discovered in ancient sea floors in Switzerland and attributed to the activity of plesiosaurs, had in fact been made by Leedsichthys spouting water through its mouth to disturb and eat the benthos, the animals dwelling in the sea floor mud.

Much is still uncertain about the life cycle of Leedsichthys. Liston's 2013 study suggested a slow, nearly linear, growth. A French study in 1993 of its bone structure concluded however, that the metabolism was rather high. Also problematic is how Leedsichthys could increase its size quickly during the first year of its life. Teleostei typically lay relatively small eggs and this has been seen as an obstacle for them attaining giant sizes.

In 1986, Martill reported the presence of a tooth of the marine crocodile Metriorhynchus in a bone of Leedsichthys. The bone would have healed, a sign that the about 3-metre-long (9.8-foot) Metriorhynchus was actively hunting the much larger fish. However, in 2007 Liston concluded the bone tissue had not in fact healed and that this was probably a case of scavenging. A 2.5 m-long specimen FBS 2012.4.67.80, assigned to Metriorhynchus cf. superciliosus, was found with the gill apparatus of Leedsichthys and remains of invertebrates inside its stomach. Such content indicates that the diet of metriorhynchids was varied, and this individual most likely ate already dead fish. However, in 2022, an actual dermal bone of Leedsichthys was identified showing evidence of healing after an attack by a large predatory marine reptile. An apex predator of the Oxford Clay seas large enough to attack Leedsichthys was the pliosaurid Liopleurodon.

In 1999 Martill suggested that a climate change at the end of the Callovian led to the extinction of Leedsichthys in the northern seas, the southern Ocean offering a last refuge during the Oxfordian. However, in 2010 Liston pointed out that Leedsichthys during the later Kimmeridgian was still present in the north, as testified by Normandian finds. Liston did nevertheless consider in 2007 that the lack of any vertebrate suspension feeders as large as 0.5 metres (1.6 feet) prior to the Callovian stage of the Mesozoic might indicate that the Callovian had seen a marked change in productivity as regarded zooplankton populations. Indeed, further studies supported this, viewing Leedsichthys as the beginning of a long line of large (>2 metres (6.6 feet) in length) pachycormid suspension feeders that continued to flourish well into the Late Cretaceous, such as Bonnerichthys and Rhinconichthys, and emphasising the convergent evolutionary paths taken by pachycormids and baleen whales.

Recent studies have uncovered some estimations regarding metabolic rate and speed for Leedsichthys. Using data from living teleost fish as a comparison, scientists discovered that Leedsichthys could have cruised along at potential speeds of 11 mph (17.8 km/h) while still maintaining oxygenation of its body tissues.
