= Ceramurus =

Ceramurus Temporal range: Tithonian

Scientific classification
- Kingdom: Animalia
- Phylum: Chordata
- Class: Actinopterygii
- Family: †Galkiniidae
- Genus: †Ceramurus; Egerton, 1845
- Species: †C. macrocephalus

Binomial name
- †Ceramurus macrocephalus Egerton, 1845

Extinct genus of fishes

Ceramurus is an extinct genus of prehistoric marine ray-finned fish from the Late Jurassic. It contains a single species, C. macrocephalus from the Purbeck Group of England.

It is one of a number of early teleosts that were originally placed in the family Pholidophoridae, prior to major revisions of the group that reclassified many genera out of it. Presently, it is tentatively placed in the family Galkiniidae alongside Galkinia of Russia, although no research has been conducted on it since this reclassification. Some authors have doubted this taxonomy, and have instead proposed affinities with Ichthyokentema.

== See also ==
- Prehistoric fish
- List of prehistoric bony fish
