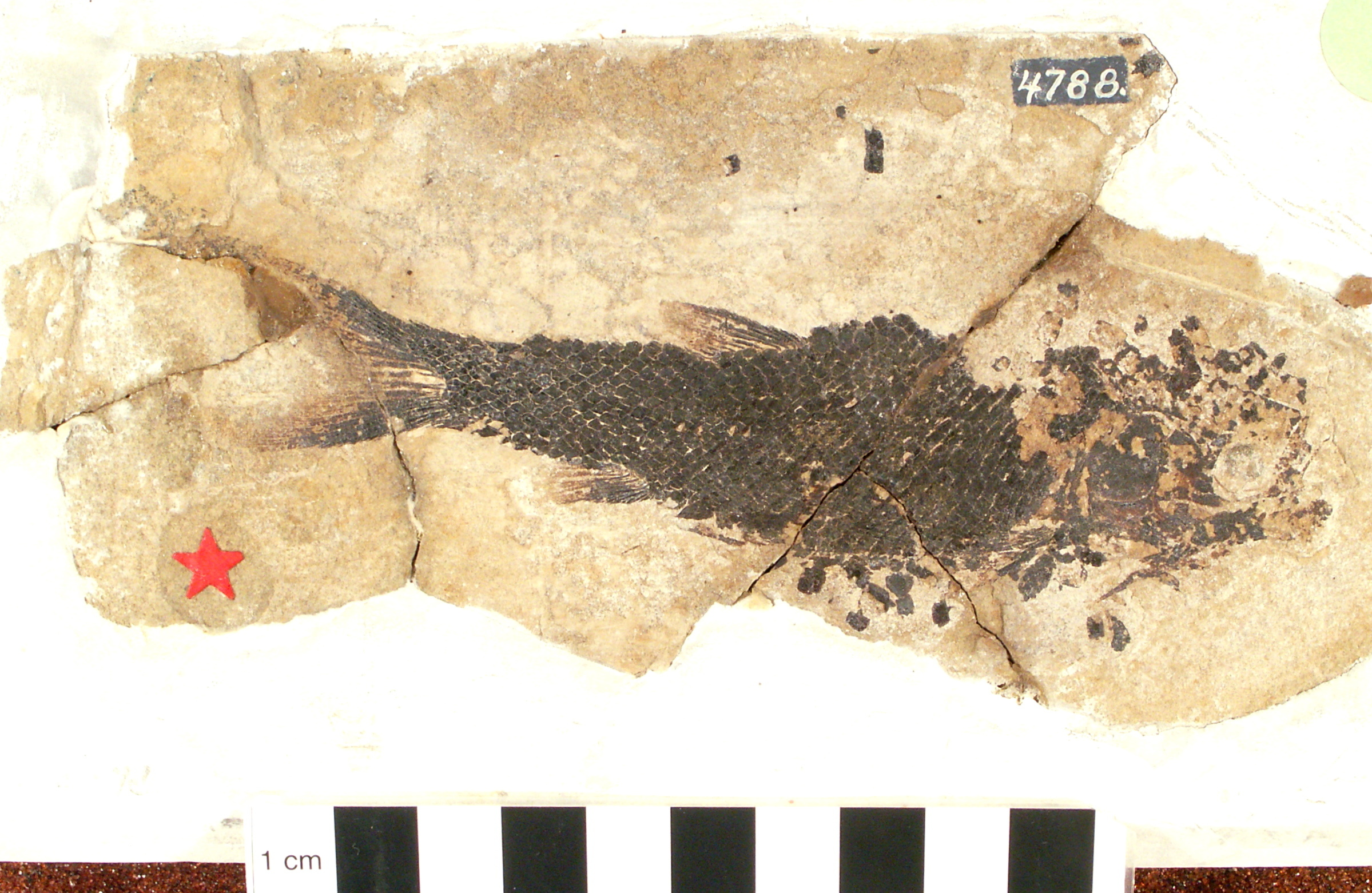
- Type specimen

Scientific classification
- Kingdom: Animalia
- Phylum: Chordata
- Class: Actinopterygii
- Infraclass: Holostei
- Genus: †Hulettia; Patterson, 1984
- Species: †H. americana

Binomial name
- †Hulettia americana (Eastman, 1899)

Other species
- †H. hawesi? Kirkland, 1997

= Hulettia =

Hulettia Temporal range: Bathonian–Oxfordian

Extinct genus of ray-finned fishes

Hulettia is an extinct genus of ray-finned fish known from the Jurassic of the western United States. This fish genus contains at least one species, H. americana.

== Species ==
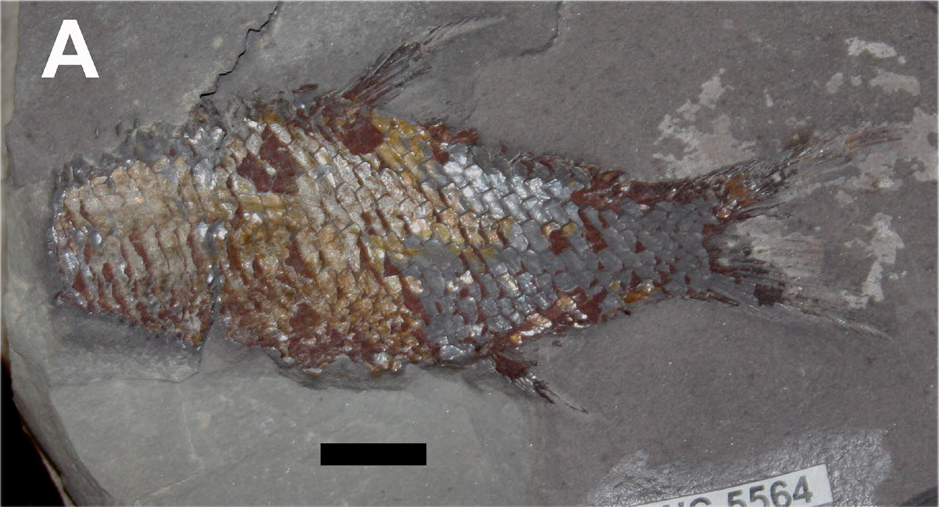
Fossil specimen of “Hulettia” hawesi from Morrison Formation.

The type species, H. americana is originally described as a species of Pholidophorus in 1899. In 1984, its own genus name Hulettia is given, after Hulett, Wyoming. Holotype is known from Sundance Formation of South Dakota, while other specimens are also known from Wanakah (Summerville) Formation, Todilto Formation and Ralston Creek Formation, which date from the Bathonian to the Oxfordian stages.

Second species, "H". hawesi is described from Morrison Formation of Colorado. This species is named after William Hawes who found the holotype. However, assignment of the species to this genus is questioned in later study, suggesting this species could be a semionotid instead.

H. americana reached their maximum standard length (excluding fins) of 15.5 centimetres (6.1 in), while "H". hawesi is much smaller, with standard length of 5.85 centimetres (2.30 in) (about 7.2 centimetres (2.8 in) total length).

== Classification ==
At 1984, it was classified as Halecostomi incertae sedis. Later study shows that is likely a member of Neopterygii, pan-holostean.

== Paleoecology ==
Formations that H. americana known are considered as marine environment, while Morrison Formation where "H". hawesi described shows freshwater environment. Discovered specimens show evidence of predation upon the smaller species of fish Todiltia.

== See also ==
- Prehistoric fish
  - List of prehistoric bony fish
- Paleobiota of the Morrison Formation
