= Pseudoleptolepis =

Scientific classification
- Kingdom: Animalia
- Phylum: Chordata
- Class: Actinopterygii
- Order: Salmoniformes
- Genus: †Pseudoleptolepis; Taverne, 1975

Extinct genus of fishes

Pseudoleptolepis is an extinct genus of prehistoric bony fish.

It is not to be confused with Leptolepis

== See also ==
- Prehistoric fish
- List of prehistoric bony fish
