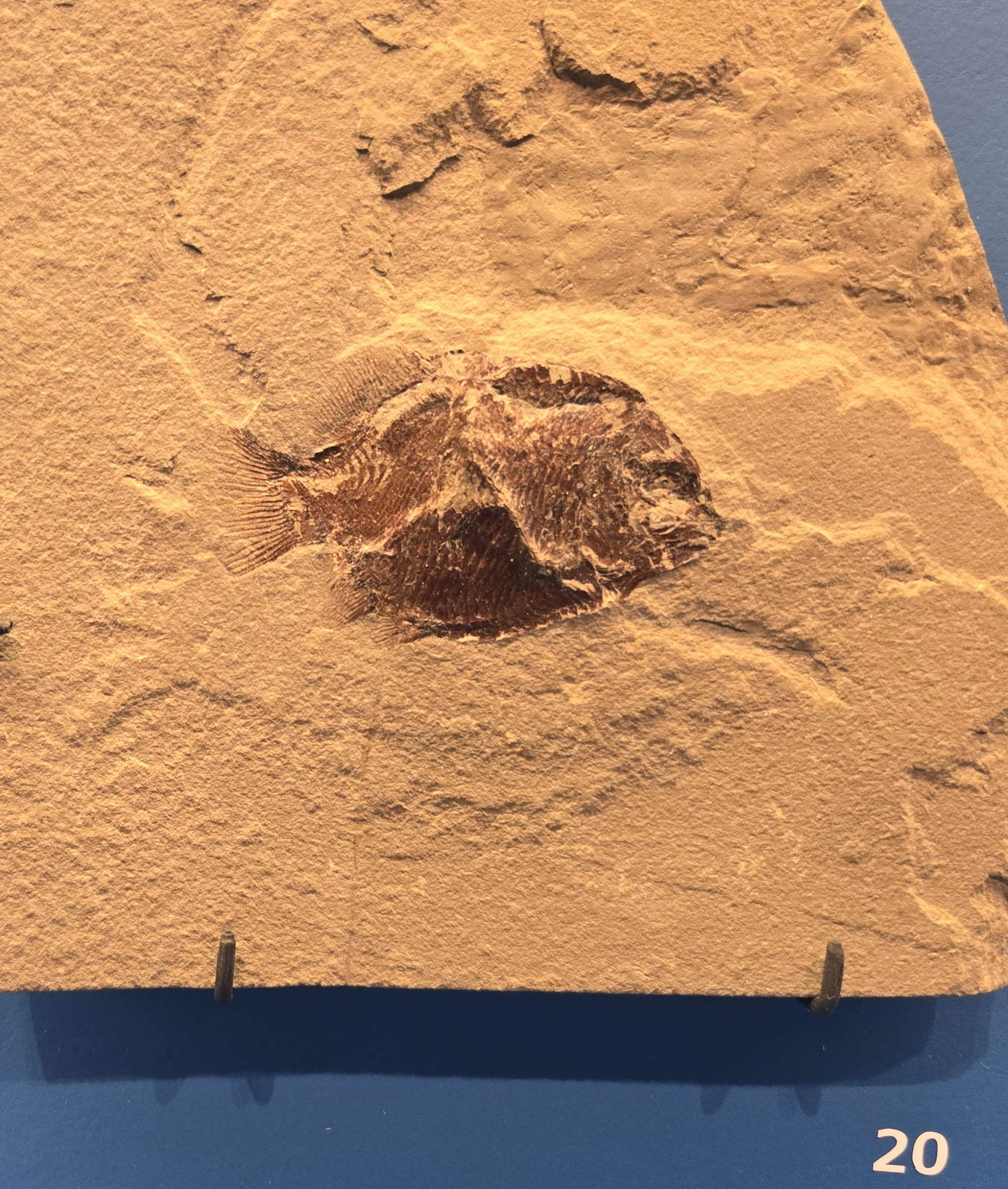
- Fossil of Guildayichthys at the Royal Ontario Museum

Scientific classification
- Kingdom: Animalia
- Phylum: Chordata
- Class: Actinopterygii
- Order: †Guildayichthyiformes
- Family: †Guildayichthyidae
- Genus: †Guildayichthys; Lund, 2000
- Species: †G. carnegiei

Binomial name
- †Guildayichthys carnegiei Lund, 2000

= Guildayichthys =

Guildayichthys Temporal range: Late Serpukhovian, 324 Ma

Extinct genus of fish

Guildayichthys is an extinct genus of marine fish that belonged to the order Guildayichthyiformes that lived in Montana during the Mississippian. It is a monospecific genus with the only species in this genus being Guildayichthys carnegiei. It has a highly compressed, discoidal body. It also has short teeth.

It was named after John Guilday who was a curator at the Fossil Mammals of Carnegie Museum in Pittsburgh, Pennsylvania. It was named after Guilday for his "unique appreciation of the beauty of life".
