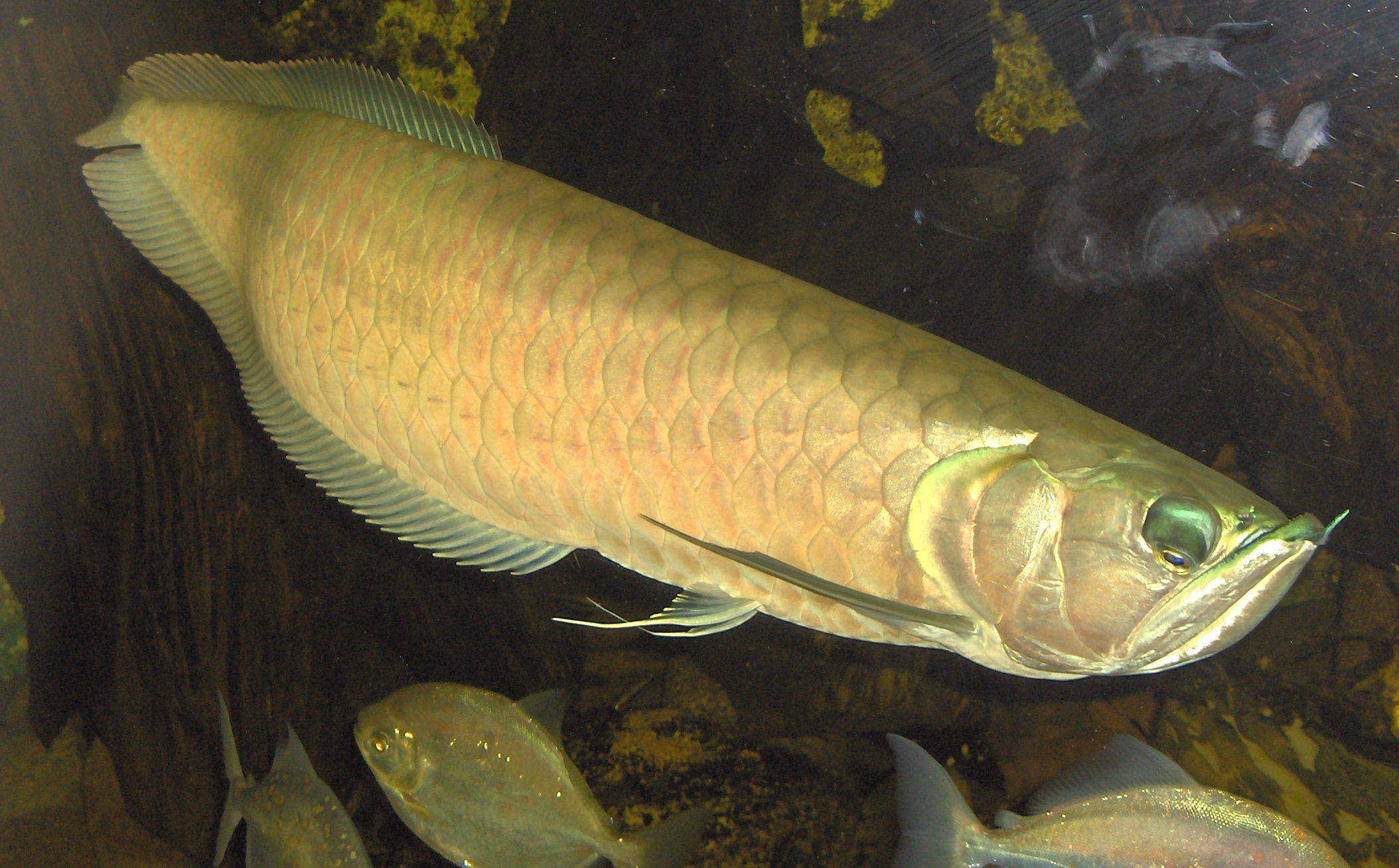
- Osteoglossum bicirrhosum

Scientific classification
- Kingdom: Animalia
- Phylum: Chordata
- Class: Actinopterygii
- Division: Teleostei
- Supercohort: Teleocephala de Pinna, 1996

= Teleocephala =

Teleocephala Temporal range: Early Jurassic–present

Supercohort of fishes

Teleocephala is a supercohort of vertebrates, it is the grouping which contains the "crown group" of the Teleostei, the bony fishes. The name was coined by Mario de Pinna in his 1996 book Interrelationships of Fishes and the clade was given the rank of supercohort by Edward O. Wiley and G. David Johnson in 2010. Some authorities treat Teleocephala and Teleosteomorpha as synonymous, however, this is only applicable when treating extant taxa and that the treatment of these taxa in the 5th edition of Fishes of the World is somewhat confusing as de Pinna's original Teleocephala is actually a combination of three taxonomical concepts.
