= Martin Simpson (geologist) =

British geologist

Martin Simpson (20 November 1800 – 20 December 1892) was a British geologist working in the Whitby area of North Yorkshire, England.

His major publications were:

- A Monograph of the Ammonites of the Yorkshire Lias, 1843
- The Fossils of the Yorkshire Lias, 1855
- A Guide to the Geology of the Yorkshire Coast, 1856
