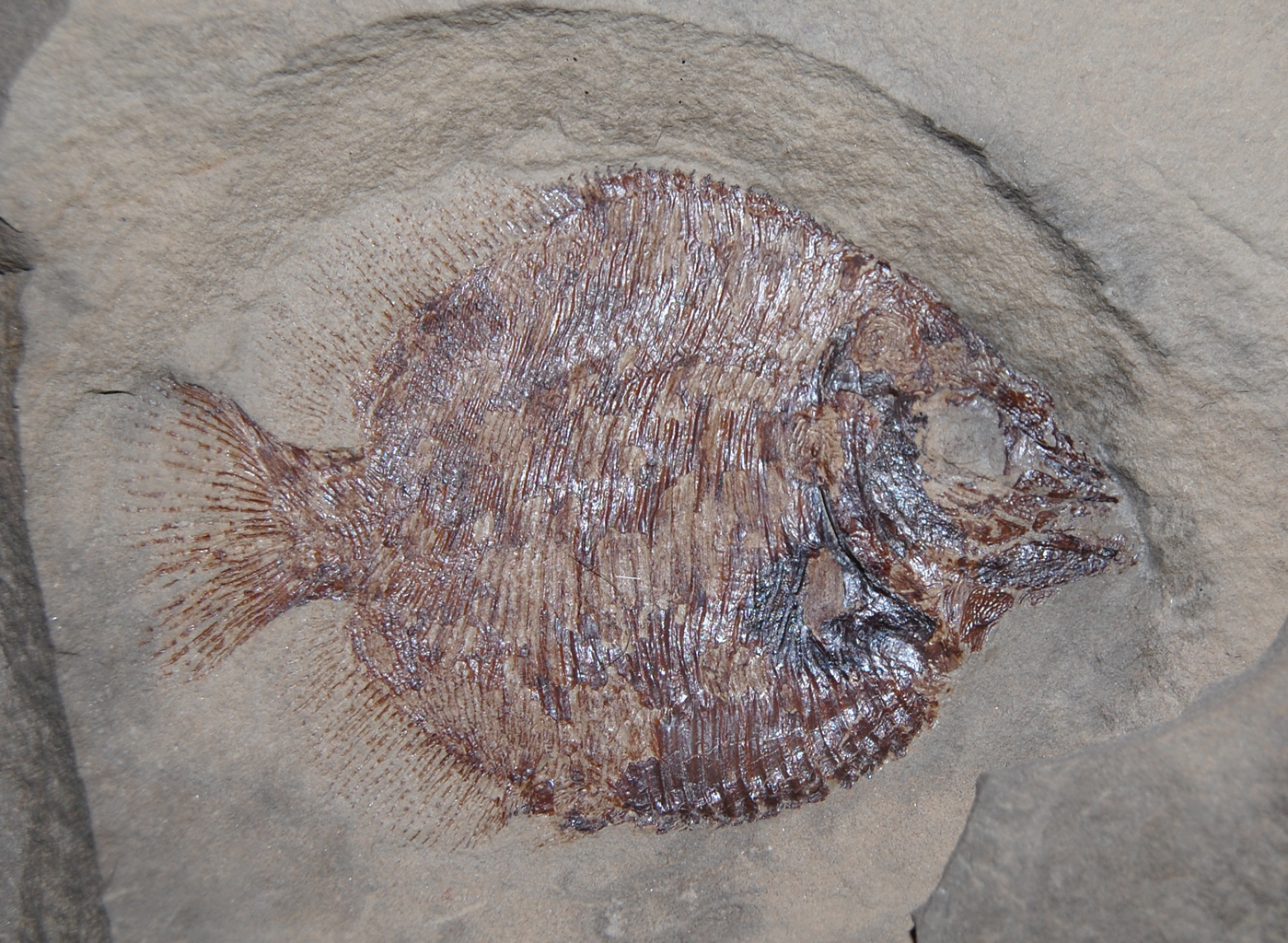
- Fossil specimen in the Natural History Museum, Vienna

Scientific classification
- Kingdom: Animalia
- Phylum: Chordata
- Class: Actinopterygii
- Order: †Guildayichthyiformes
- Family: †Guildayichthyidae
- Genus: †Discoserra; Lund, 2000
- Species: †D. pectinodon

Binomial name
- †Discoserra pectinodon Lund, 2000

= Discoserra =

Discoserra Temporal range: Mississippian

Extinct genus of ray-finned fishes

Discoserra ("serrated disc") is an extinct genus of ray-finned fish from the Mississippian of the Bear Gulch Limestone in Montana. It is a member of the Guildayichthyiformes with a round body and a skull possessing primitive and modern traits. Discoserra is about 60 mm long. In 2006, Discoserra was hypothesized to be a stem neopterygian, although it has alternatively been placed in Cladistia along with other Guildayichthyiformes.
