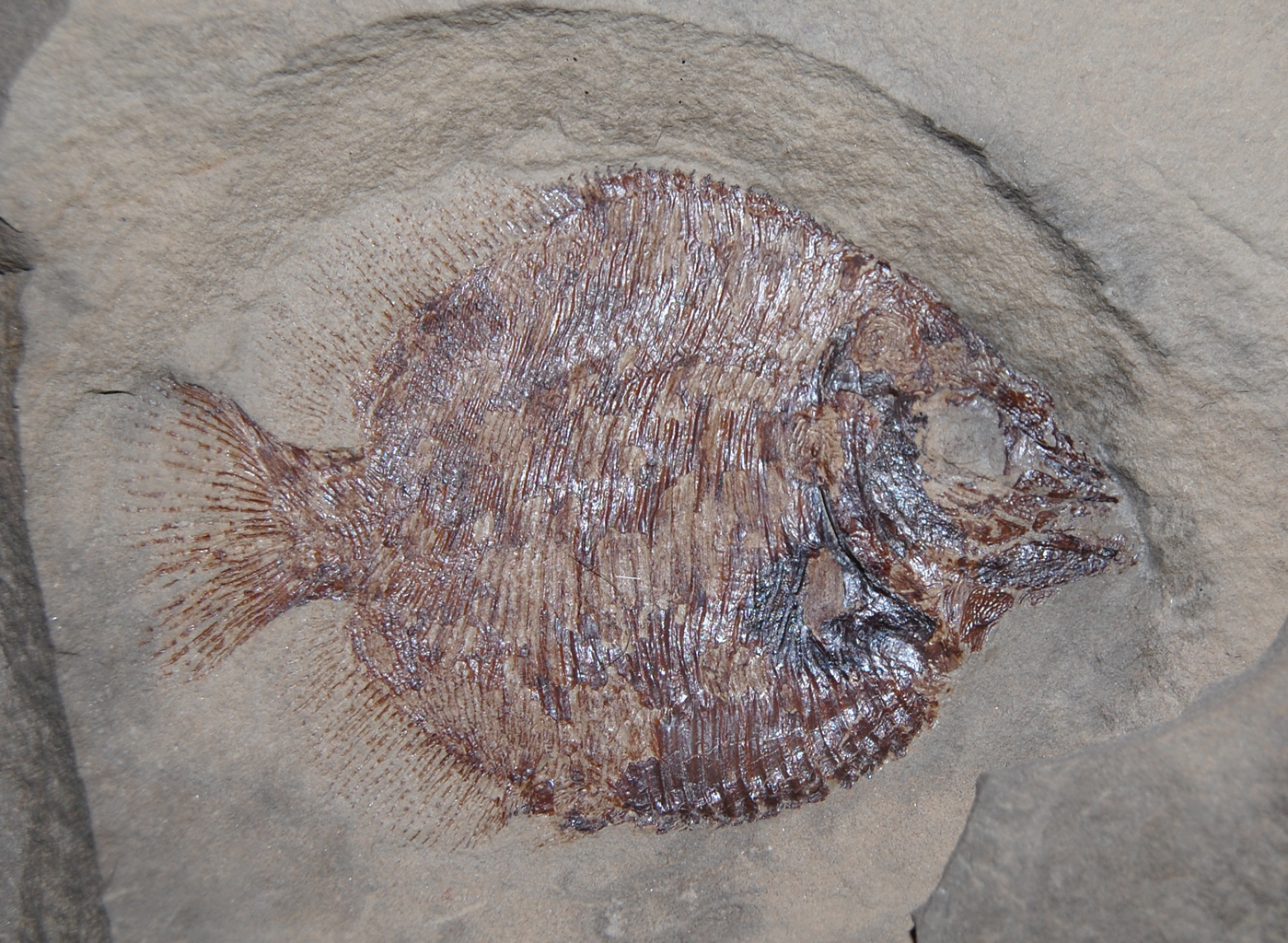
- Fossil of Discoserra pectinodon

Scientific classification
- Kingdom: Animalia
- Phylum: Chordata
- Class: Actinopterygii
- Order: †Guildayichthyiformes; Lund, 2000
- Family: †Guildayichthyidae; Lund, 2000

Genera
- See text

= Guildayichthyidae =

Guildayichthyidae Temporal range: Late Mississippian

Extinct order of ray-finned fishes

Guildayichthyidae is an extinct family of marine fish from the Mississippian Bear Gulch Limestone of Montana. It is the only family in the order Guildayichthyiformes. Guildayichthyids possess an uncommon mixture of primitive and modern characteristics in their skull bones.

Their taxonomy has long been debated, with studies placing them within the Neopterygii, while others placed them within the Cladistia. A 2025 study found them to most likely be the sister group to the extinct Bobasatraniiformes, with the two forming an early-diverging clade within the crown group Actinopterygii.

== Taxonomy ==
This family consists of the following genera and species:

- Genus Guildayichthys Lund, 2000
  - Species Guildayichthys carnegiei Lund, 2000
- Genus Discoserra Lund, 2000
  - Species Discoserra pectinodon Lund, 2000
