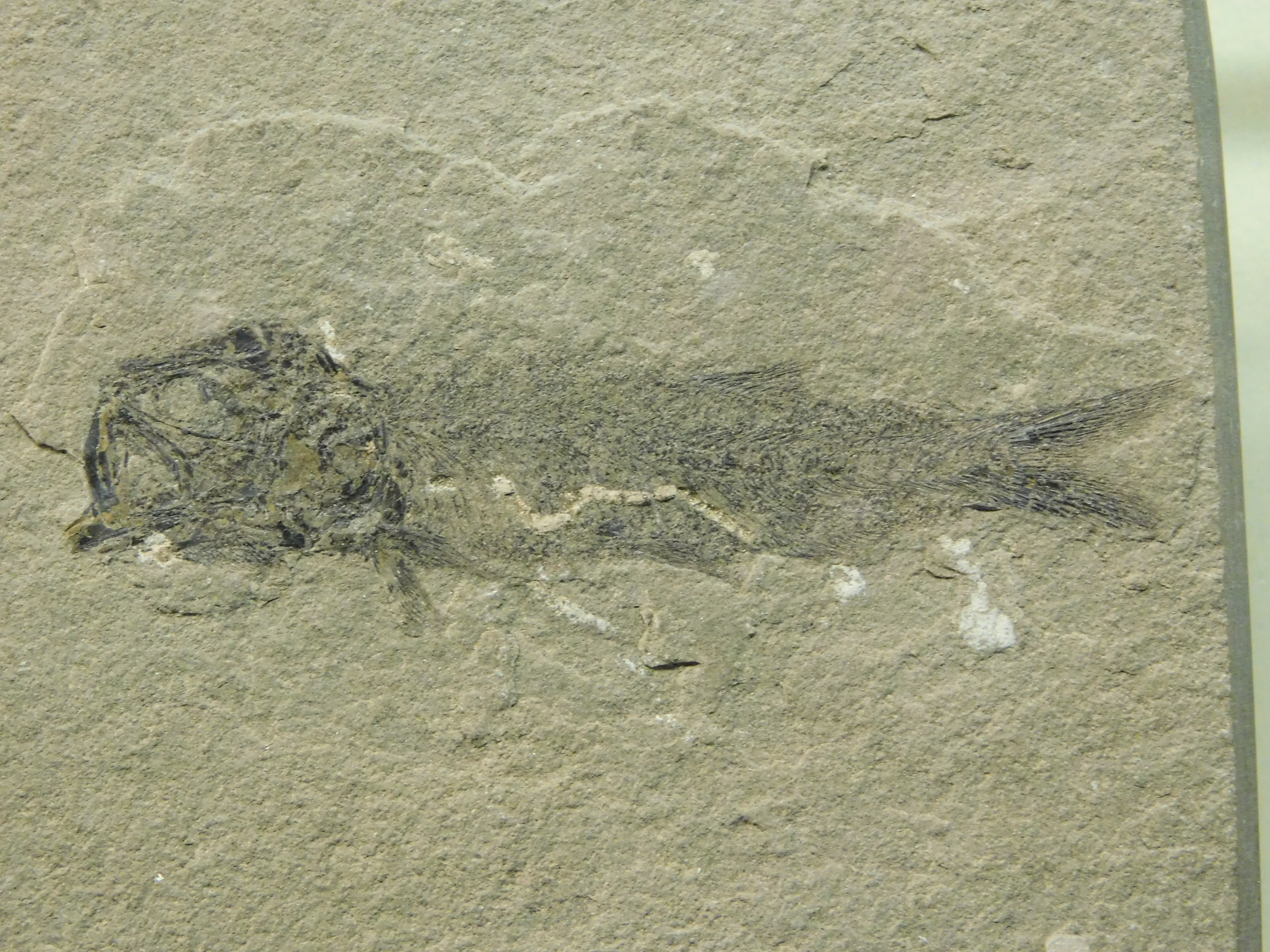
- Specimen with preserved gut content

Scientific classification
- Kingdom: Animalia
- Phylum: Chordata
- Class: Actinopterygii
- Genus: †Todiltia; Schaeffer & Patterson, 1984

Type species
- Todiltia schoewei Dunkle, 1942

= Todiltia =

Extinct genus of fishes

Todiltia is an extinct genus of prehistoric bony fish. It was originally described in 1942 as a species of the genus Leptolepis. However in 1984, it was assigned its own genus name Todiltia, named after the Todilto Limestone of the Wanakah Formation where it was found.

Fossils have been found in Colorado and New Mexico within strata dated to the lower Callovian Stage of the Middle Jurassic. Numerous specimens from various growth stages have been discovered, with the largest (NMNH 17899) measuring 124 mm.

== See also ==
- Prehistoric fish
- List of prehistoric bony fish
