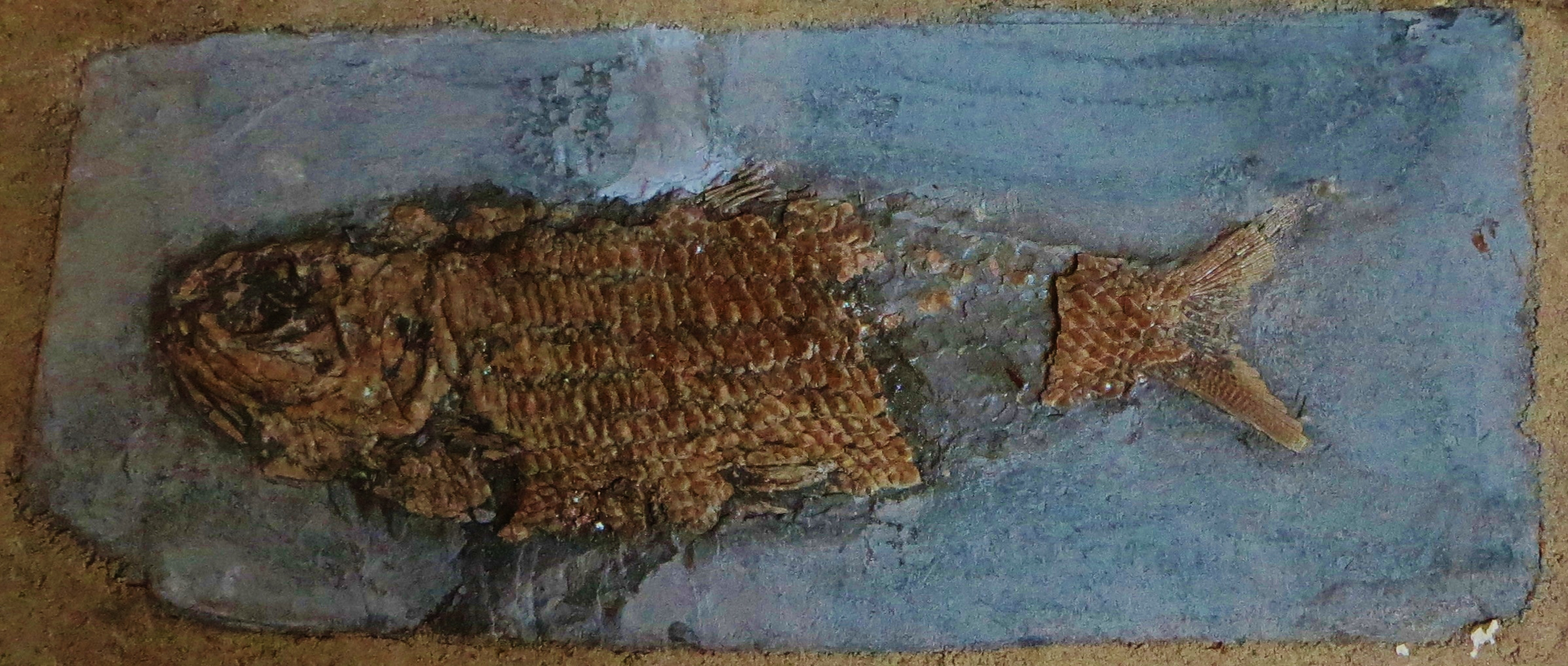
- Fossil of D. bechei, Teylers Museum, Haarlem

Scientific classification
- Kingdom: Animalia
- Phylum: Chordata
- Class: Actinopterygii
- Division: Teleostei
- Order: †Dorsetichthyiformes; Arratia, 2013
- Family: †Dorsetichthyidae; Arratia, 2013
- Genus: †Dorsetichthys; Arratia, 2013
- Species: †D. bechei

Binomial name
- †Dorsetichthys bechei (Agassiz, 1837)

Synonyms
- Pholidophorus bechei Agassiz, 1837

= Dorsetichthys =

Dorsetichthys Temporal range: Early Jurassic (Sinemurian), 199.3–192 Ma

Extinct genus of ray-finned fishes

Dorsetichthys is an extinct genus of marine stem-teleost ray-finned fish from the Early Jurassic period of Europe. It contains a single species, D. bechei, known from the Sinemurian-aged Lower Lias of England and the Moltrasio Formation of Italy.

== Description ==
Dorsetichthys was an elongated teleost that could reach up to 20 centimetres (7.9 in) long. This fish had ganoid scales close to modern gars.

== Taxonomy ==
The type species of Dorsetichthys, D. bechei, was formerly assigned to Pholidophorus, but Arratia (2013) recognized it as generically distinct from the Pholidophorus type species, placing it in the new family Dorsetichthyidae and new order Dorsetichthyiformes.

Dorsetichthys is widely considered to be a teleosteomorph, a primitive early relative of teleosts, the group that comprises the vast majority of living ray-finned fish. Cladogram of Teleosteomorpha after Sferco et al. 2021:

- Holostei
- Teleostei total group (Teleosteomorpha)
  - Pachycormiformes
  - - Aspidorhynchiformes
    - Mesturus
    - - Pholidophoridae
      - - Siemensichythys
        - - Dorsetichthys
          - - Eurycormus
            - - Leptolepidae
              - - Luisiellidae
                - - Tharsis dubius
                  - - Varasichthyidae
                    - - Ascalabos
                      - - Ichthyodectiformes
                        - Teleostei crown group (including Crossognathiformes)

== Ecology ==
One probable specimen of Dorsetichthys has been found preserved within the jaws of the larger fish Dapedium punctatum suggesting that it was preyed upon by the larger fish.
