= Atacamichthys =

Atacamichthys Temporal range: Oxfordian

Scientific classification
- Kingdom: Animalia
- Phylum: Chordata
- Class: Actinopterygii
- Division: Teleostei (?)
- Family: †Atacamichthyidae; Arratia et al., 2021
- Genus: †Atacamichthys; Arratia & Schultze, 1987
- Species: †A. greeni

Binomial name
- †Atacamichthys greeni Arratia & Schultze, 1987

Extinct genus of ray-finned fishes

Atacamichthys is an extinct genus of marine ray-finned fish. It contains one species, Atacamichthys greeni, which lived in what is now Chile during the Oxfordian stage of the Late Jurassic epoch. Atacamichthys is the only member of the family Atacamichthyidae.
