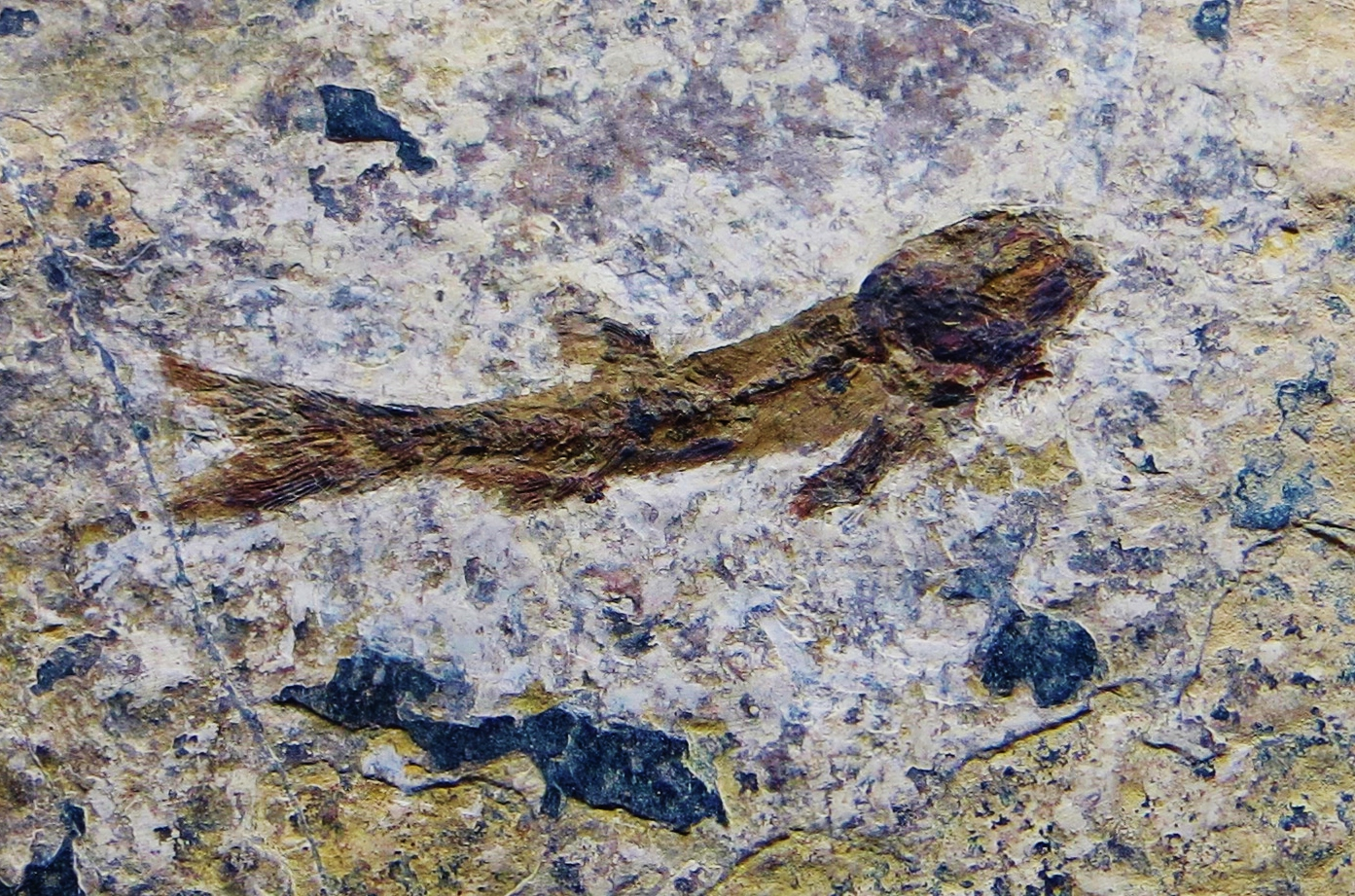
- Prohalecites sp. fossil

Scientific classification
- Kingdom: Animalia
- Phylum: Chordata
- Class: Actinopterygii
- Infraclass: Teleosteomorpha
- Order: †Prohaleciteiformes; Arratia, 2017
- Family: †Prohaleciteidae; Arratia, 2017
- Genus: †Prohalecites; Deecke, 1889
- Species: †P. porroi

Binomial name
- †Prohalecites porroi (Bellotti, 1857)

= Prohalecites =

Prohalecites Temporal range: Ladinian–Carnian

Extinct genus of ray-finned fishes

Prohalecites is an extinct genus of ray-finned fish from the Ladinian and possibly Carnian (Triassic) of Italy. It is the oldest known teleosteomorph, a group that includes extant teleosts and their close fossil relatives.

The type and only known species, Prohalecites porroi, was first described as "Pholidophorus porroi" by Cristoforo Bellotti, but it was later accommodated in its own genus by Wilhelm Deecke. The species "Pholidophorus" microlepidotus has occasionally been included in this genus as well, but it differed greatly from P. porroi in several respects, indicating that it was not closely related.

Species of Prohalecites are small, often measuring not more than 4 centimetres (1.6 in) in body length.

== See also ==
- List of prehistoric bony fish genera
