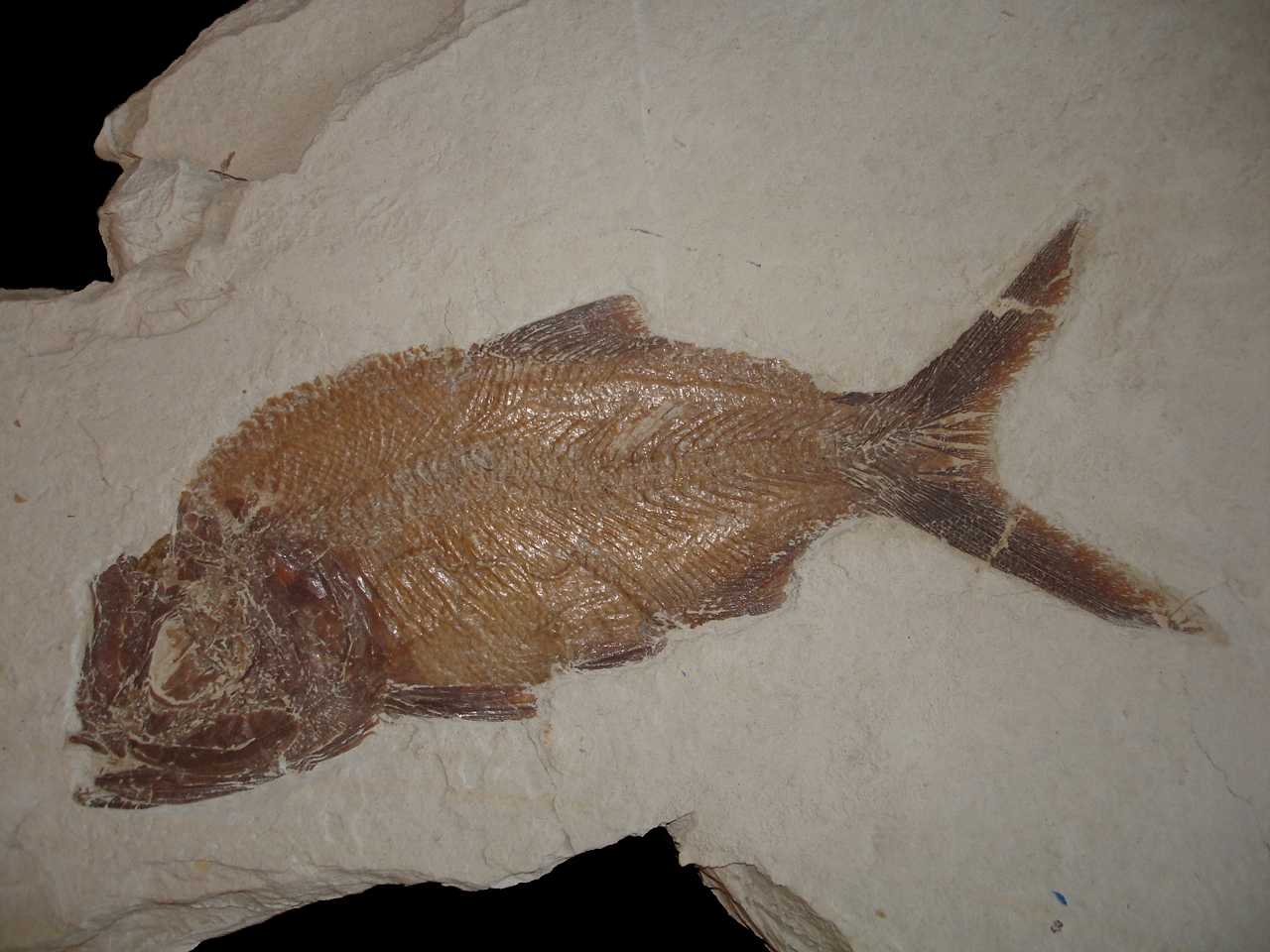
- Specimen from Painten

Scientific classification
- Kingdom: Animalia
- Phylum: Chordata
- Class: Actinopterygii
- Order: †Pholidophoriformes (?)
- Family: †Eurycormidae; Arratia, 2017
- Genus: †Eurycormus; Wagner, 1863
- Species: †E. speciosus

Binomial name
- †Eurycormus speciosus Wagner, 1863

= Eurycormus =

Eurycormus Temporal range: Early Tithonian

Extinct genus of ray-finned fishes

Eurycormus is an extinct genus of prehistoric marine ray-finned fish known from the Late Jurassic. It contains a single species, E. speciosus, known from the early Tithonian-aged Eichstätt Formation of Germany.

It was initially considered a halecomorph related to Caturus, but more recent studies indicate it to be a teleosteomorph, potentially in the Pholidophoriformes. Specimens of the genus Eurypoma from the Middle Jurassic of England and France were also formerly placed in this genus but have since been split, with Eurypoma known to be an actual halecomorph.

== See also ==
- List of prehistoric bony fish genera
