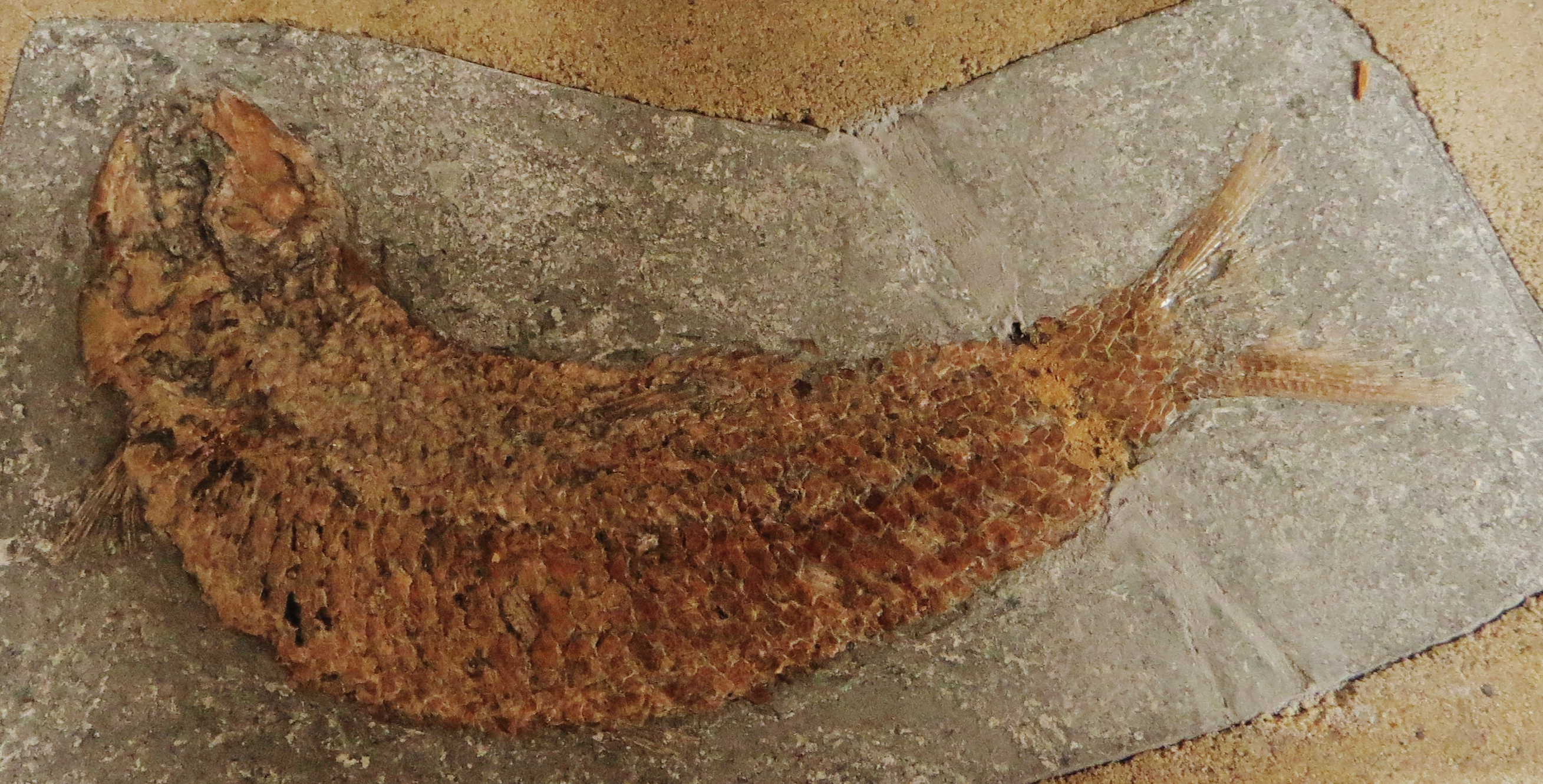
- Pholidophorus latiusculus fossil

Scientific classification
- Kingdom: Animalia
- Phylum: Chordata
- Class: Actinopterygii
- Division: Teleostei
- Order: †Pholidophoriformes
- Family: †Pholidophoridae
- Genus: †Pholidophorus; Agassiz, 1832
- Species: †P. latiusculus

Binomial name
- †Pholidophorus latiusculus Agassiz, 1832

= Pholidophorus =

Pholidophorus Temporal range: Norian

Extinct genus of ray-finned fishes

Pholidophorus (from Greek: φολῐ́ς pholis, 'horny scale' and Greek: φέρω phérō, 'to bear') is an extinct genus of stem-teleost fish. Numerous species were assigned to this genus in the past, but only the type species Pholidophorus latiusculus, from the Late Triassic of Europe, is considered to be a valid member of the genus today.

== Taxonomy ==
For a long time, the genus Pholidophorus served as a wastebasket taxon containing various unrelated species of basal stem teleosts. Over the years, many of these have been moved to separate genera. The Late Jurassic nominal species "Pholidophorus" purbeckensis was renamed Ichthyokentema by Arthur Woodward in 1941. Likewise, the Early Jurassic form "Pholidophorus" bechei was renamed Dorsetichthys and moved to its own family, Dorsetichthyidae, by Arratia (2013). The nominal species "Pholidophorus" friedeni Delsate, 1999, and "Pholidophorus" gervasuttii Zambelli, 1980, were renamed Luxembourgichthys and Lombardichthys by Taverne and Steurbaut (2017) and Arratia (2017), respectively.

== Description ==
Pholidophorus was a herring-like fish with average standard length about 6 centimetres (2.4 in) long, although it was not closely related to modern herring. Like them, however, it had a single dorsal fin, a symmetrical tail, and an anal fin placed towards the rear of the body. It had large eyes and was probably a fast-swimming predator, hunting planktonic crustaceans and smaller fish.

A very early teleost, Pholidophorus had many primitive characteristics, such as ganoid scales and a spine that was partially composed of cartilage rather than bone.
