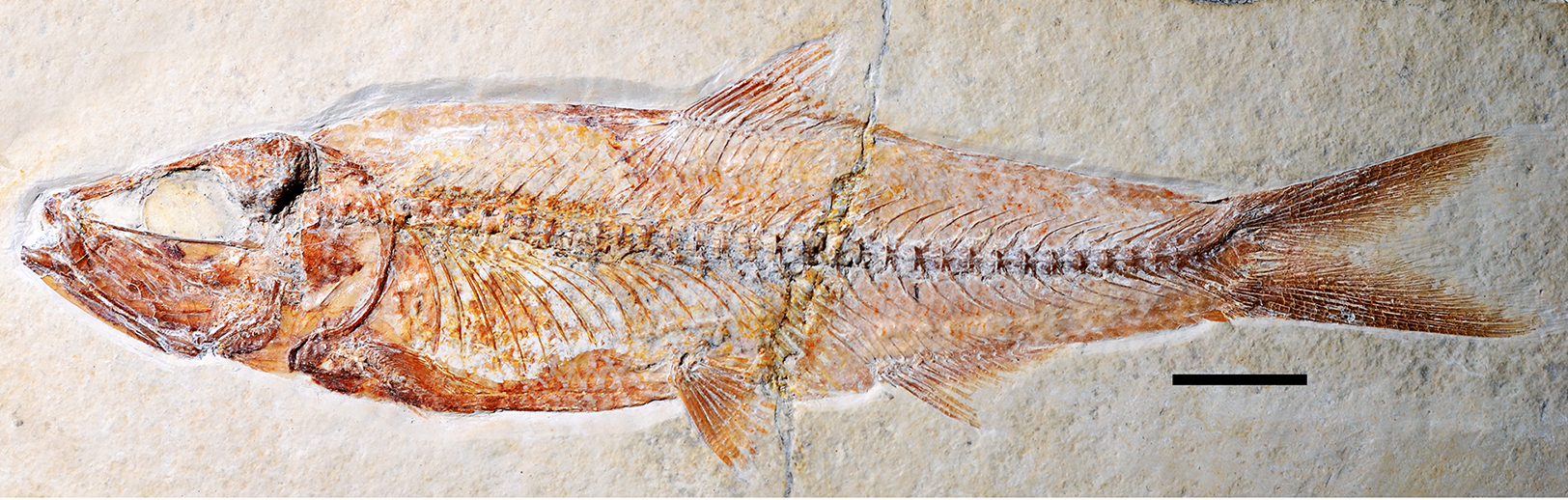
- Fossil of A. voithii

Scientific classification
- Domain: Eukaryota
- Kingdom: Animalia
- Phylum: Chordata
- Class: Actinopterygii
- Order: †Ascalaboidiformes
- Family: †Ascalaboidae
- Genus: †Ascalabos; Münster, 1839
- Species: †A. voithii

Binomial name
- †Ascalabos voithii Münster, 1839

= Ascalabos =

Ascalabos Temporal range: Tithonian

Extinct genus of ray-finned fishes

Ascalabos is an extinct genus of marine ray-finned fish known from the Late Jurassic Solnhofen Limestone of Germany. It contains one species, A. voithii. Some authorities synonymize it with Leptolepis.

== See also ==
- List of prehistoric bony fish genera
