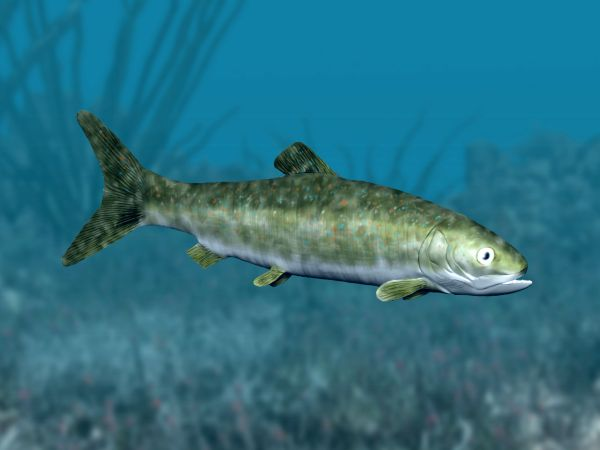
- Life restoration of I. purbeckensis

Scientific classification
- Kingdom: Animalia
- Phylum: Chordata
- Class: Actinopterygii
- Division: Teleostei
- Family: †Ichthyokentemidae
- Genus: †Ichthyokentema; Woodward, 1941
- Species: †I. purbeckensis

Binomial name
- †Ichthyokentema purbeckensis (Davies, 1887)

Synonyms
- Pholidophorus purbeckensis Davies, 1887

= Ichthyokentema =

Ichthyokentema Temporal range: Early Cretaceous (Berriasian)

Extinct genus of ray-finned fishes

Ichthyokentema ("fish-goad") is an extinct genus of freshwater stem-teleost fish known from the earliest Cretaceous. It contains one species, I. purbeckensis, which is known from the Berriasian-aged Lulworth Formation in the Purbeck Group of Dorset, England. I. purbeckensis was originally described as a species of Pholidophorus by William Davies in 1887, but was moved to its own genus by Arthur Smith Woodward in 1941.

It is the only known member of the family Ichthyokentemidae, which was previously placed in the now-paraphyletic order Pholidophoriformes. More recent studies suggest that Ichthyokentema represents a relatively basal teleost lineage. Some studies have found it to be the secondmost basal lineage, second only to Pleuropholidae, while others have found it to be related to the Ankylophoridae.

== See also ==
- List of prehistoric bony fish genera
