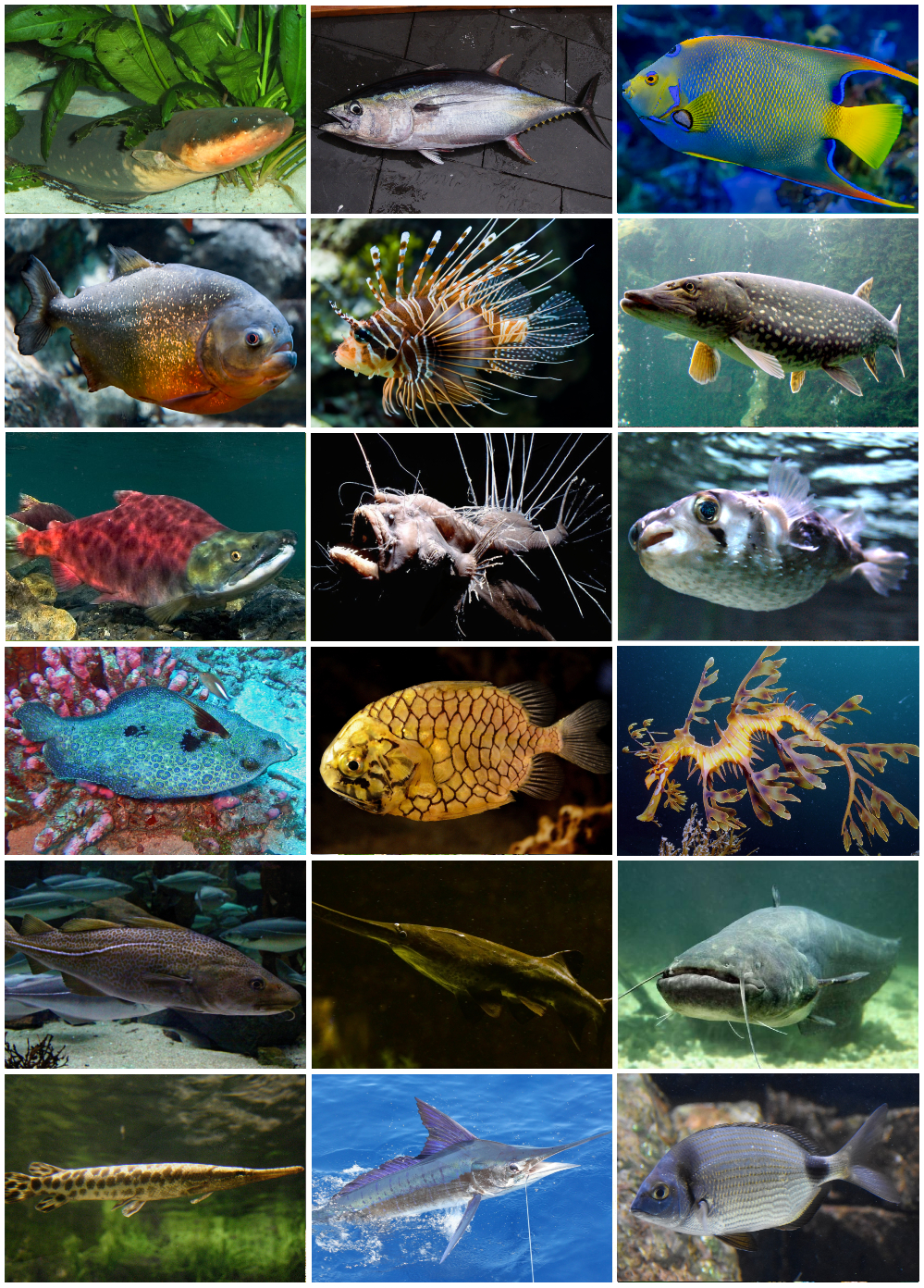

Scientific classification
- Kingdom: Animalia
- Phylum: Chordata
- Clade: Osteichthyes
- Class: Actinopterygii; Klein, 1885

Subclasses
- Cladistia (bichirs and reedfish); Actinopteri; Chondrostei (sturgeon and paddlefish); Neopterygii; Holostei (bowfins and gar); Teleosteomorpha; Teleostei (teleosts)

= Actinopterygii =

Ray-finned fish Temporal range: Late Silurian–present, 425–0 Ma

Class of ray-finned bony fishes

Actinopterygii (/ˌæktɪnɒptəˈrɪdʒiaɪ/; from Ancient Greek ἀκτίς (aktís) 'ray, beam' and πτέρυξ (ptérux) 'wing, fins'), members of which are known as ray-finned fish or actinopterygians, is a class of bony fish that constitutes nearly 99% of the over 30,000 living species of fish. The vast majority of extant actinopterygian species are teleosts, and by species count they dominate the subphylum Vertebrata, comprising over 50% of all living vertebrates. They are the most abundant nektonic aquatic animals and are ubiquitous throughout freshwater, brackish and marine environments from the deep sea to subterranean waters to the highest mountain streams. Extant species can range in size from Paedocypris, at 8 mm (0.3 in), to the giant sunfish, at 2,700 kg (6,000 lb), and the giant oarfish, at 8 m (26 ft) (or possibly 11 m (36 ft)). The largest ever known ray-finned fish, the extinct Leedsichthys from the Jurassic, is estimated to have grown to 16.5 m (54 ft).

Ray-finned fish are so called because of their lightly built fins made of webbings of skin supported by radially extended thin bony spines called lepidotrichia, as opposed to the bulkier, fleshy fins of the sister clade Sarcopterygii (lobe-finned fish). Resembling folding fans, the actinopterygian fins can easily change shape, orientation and wetted area, providing superior thrust-to-weight ratios per movement compared to sarcopterygian and chondrichthyian fins. The fin rays attach directly to the proximal or basal skeletal elements, the radials, which represent the articulation between these fins and the internal skeleton (e.g., pelvic and pectoral girdles).

== Characteristics ==
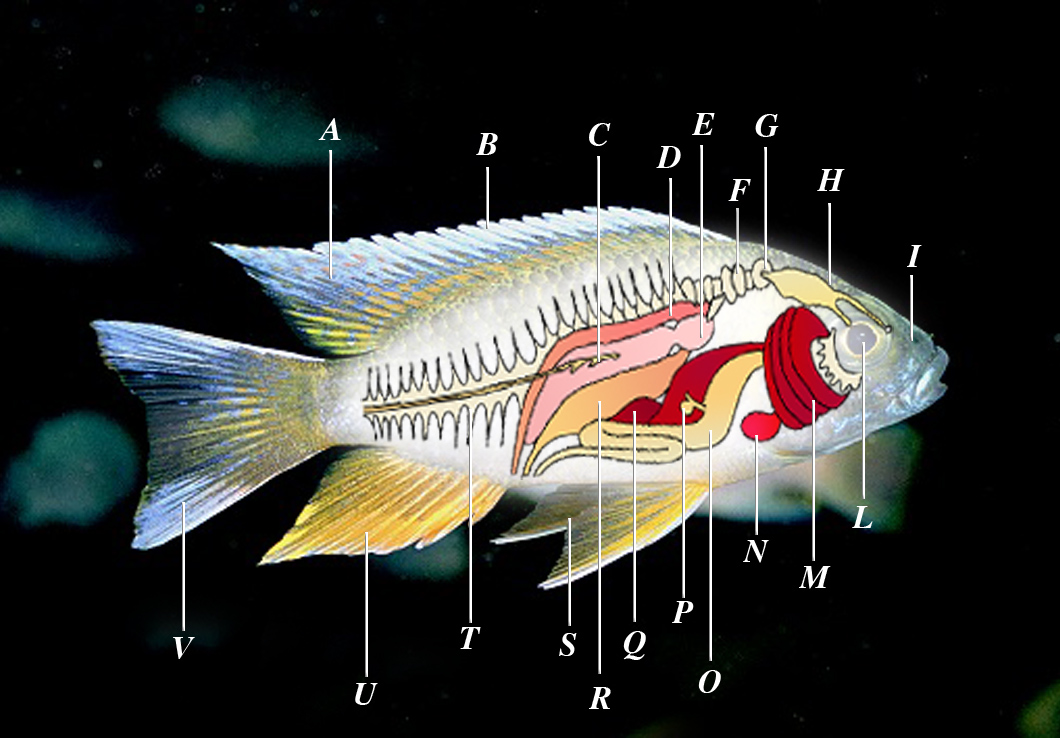
Anatomy of a typical ray-finned fish (cichlid) A: dorsal fin, B: fin rays, C: lateral line, D: kidney, E: swim bladder, F: Weberian apparatus, G: inner ear, H: brain, I: nostrils, L: eye, M: gills, N: heart, O: stomach, P: gall bladder, Q: spleen, R: internal sex organs (ovaries or testes), S: pelvic fins, T: spine, U: anal fin, V: tail (caudal fin). Possible other parts not shown: barbels, adipose fin, external genitalia (gonopodium)

Ray-finned fishes occur in many variant forms. The main features of typical ray-finned fish are shown in the adjacent diagram. The swim bladder is a more derived structure and used for buoyancy. Except from the bichirs, which just like the lungs of lobe-finned fish have retained the ancestral condition of ventral budding from the foregut, the swim bladder in ray-finned fishes derives from a dorsal bud above the foregut. In early forms the swim bladder could still be used for breathing, a trait still present in Holostei (bowfins and gars). In some fish like the arapaima, the swim bladder has been modified for breathing air again, and in other lineages it has been completely lost. The teleosts have urinary and reproductive tracts that are fully separated, while the Chondrostei have common urogenital ducts, and partially connected ducts are found in Cladistia and Holostei. Ray-finned fishes have many different types of scales; but all teleosts have leptoid scales. The outer part of these scales fan out with bony ridges, while the inner part is crossed with fibrous connective tissue. Leptoid scales are thinner and more transparent than other types of scales, and lack the hardened enamel- or dentine-like layers found in the scales of many other fish. Unlike ganoid scales, which are found in non-teleost actinopterygians, new scales are added in concentric layers as the fish grows. Teleosts and chondrosteans (sturgeons and paddlefish) also differ from the bichirs and holosteans (bowfin and gars) in having gone through a whole-genome duplication (paleopolyploidy). The WGD is estimated to have happened about 320 million years ago in the teleosts, which on average has retained about 17% of the gene duplicates, and around 180 (124–225) million years ago in the chondrosteans. It has since happened again in some teleost lineages, like Salmonidae (80–100 million years ago) and several times independently within the Cyprinidae (in goldfish and common carp as recently as 14 million years ago).

== Body shapes and fin arrangements ==
Ray-finned fish vary in size and shape, in their feeding specializations, and in the number and arrangement of their ray-fins.

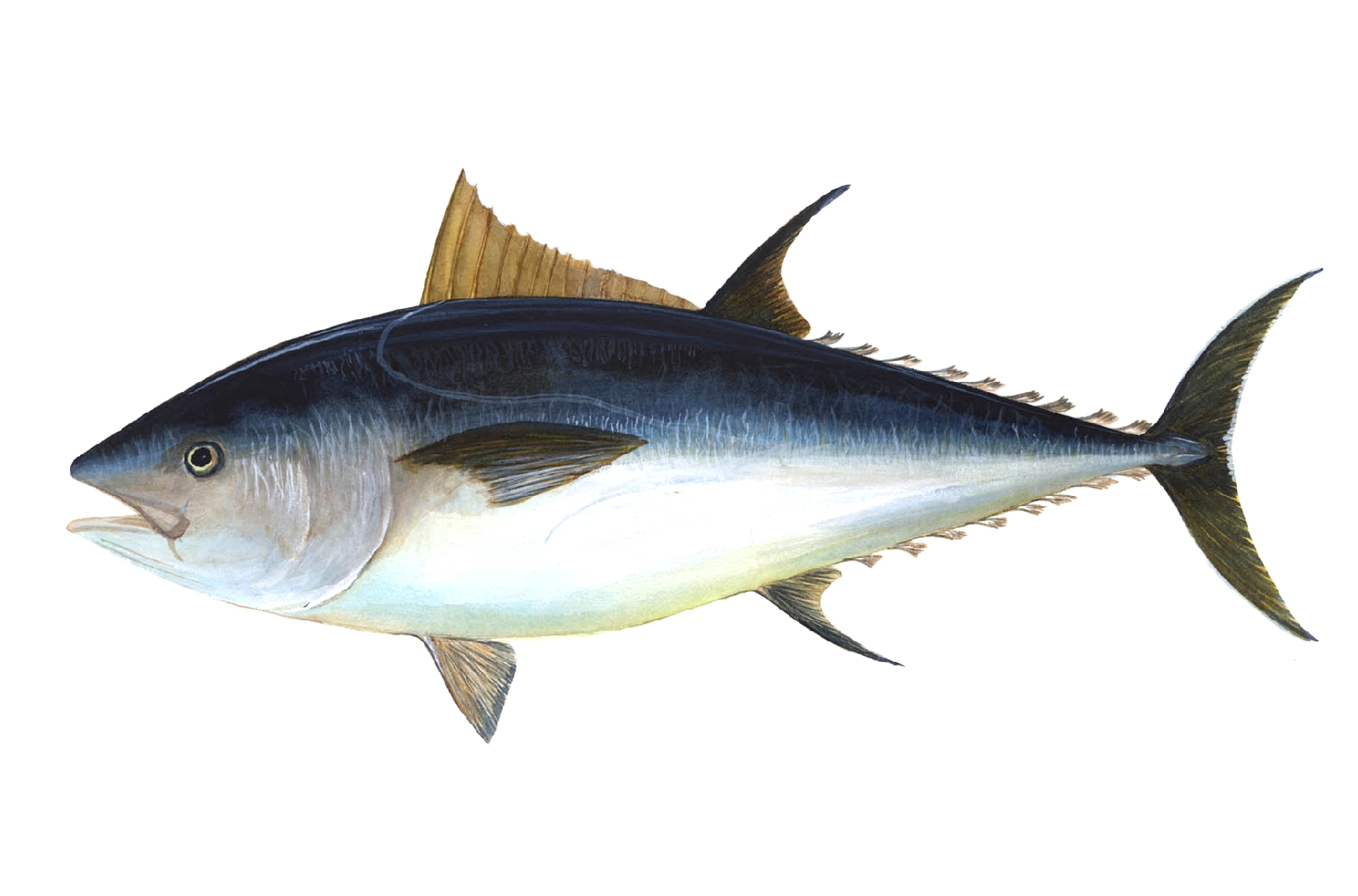
Tuna are streamlined for straight line speed with a deeply forked tail

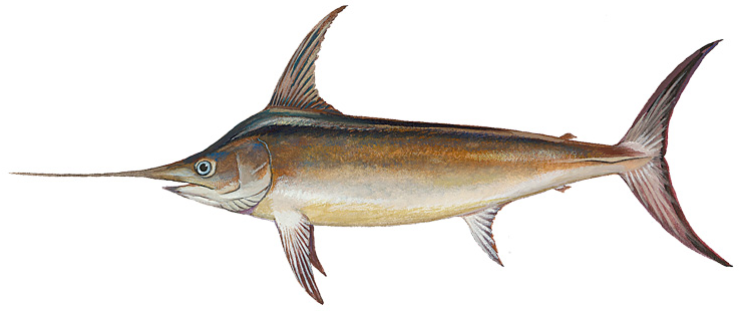
The swordfish is even faster and more streamlined than the tuna

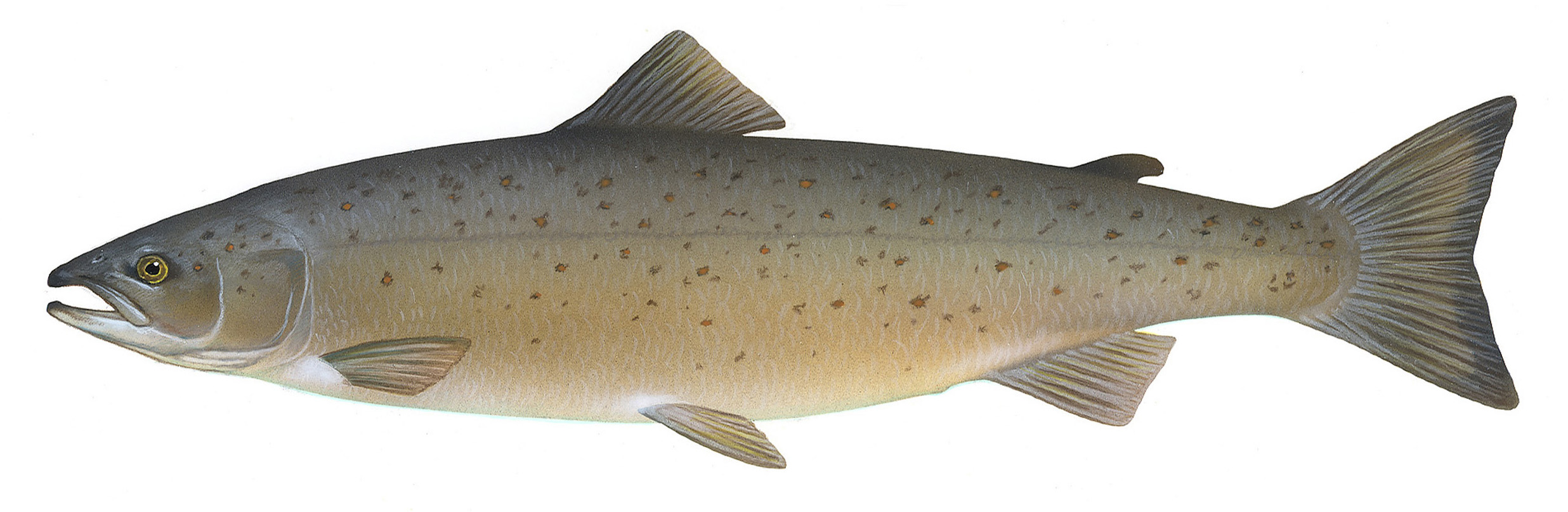
Salmon generate enough thrust with their tail fin to jump obstacles during river migrations

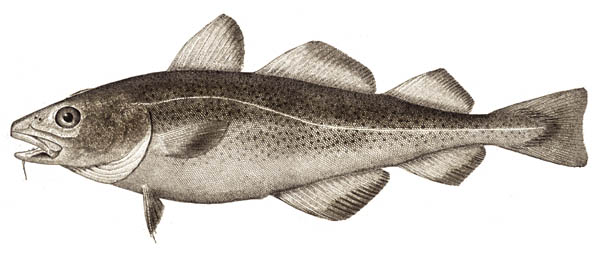
Cod have three dorsal and two anal fins, which give them great maneuverability

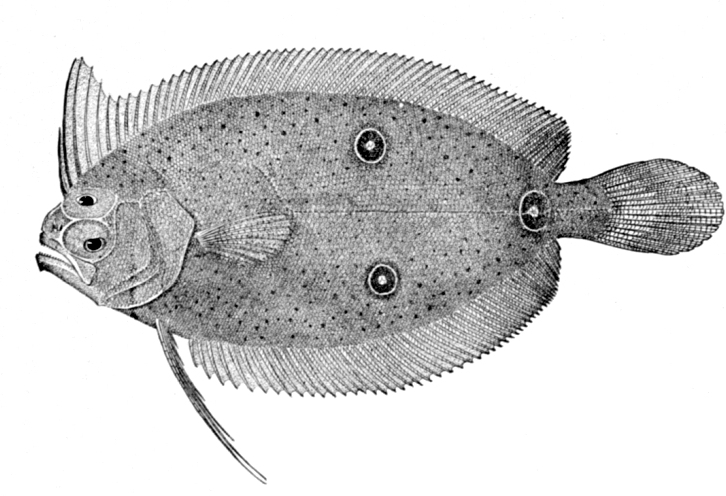
Flatfish have developed partially symmetric dorsal and pelvic fins

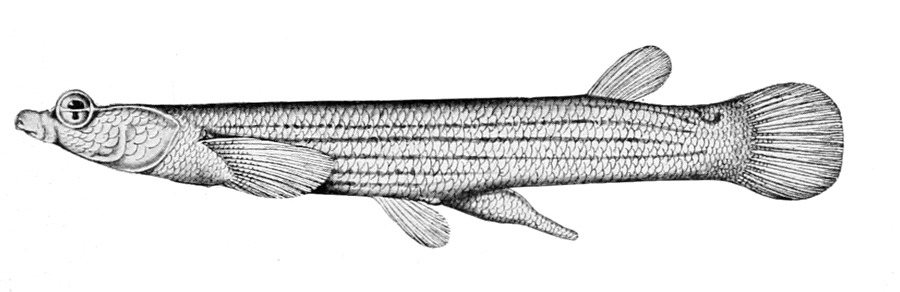
The four-eyed fish Anableps anableps can see both below and above the water surface

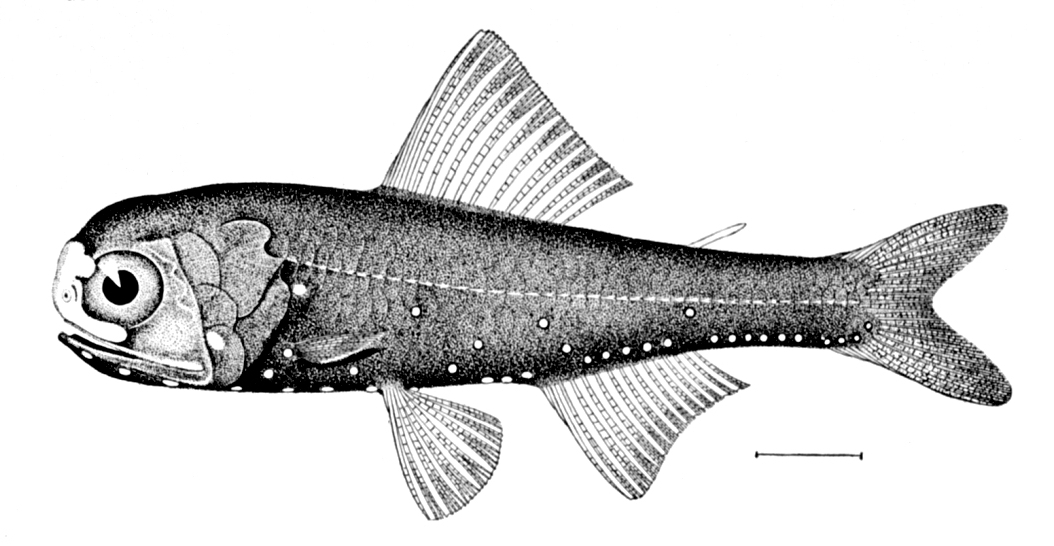
Lanternfish

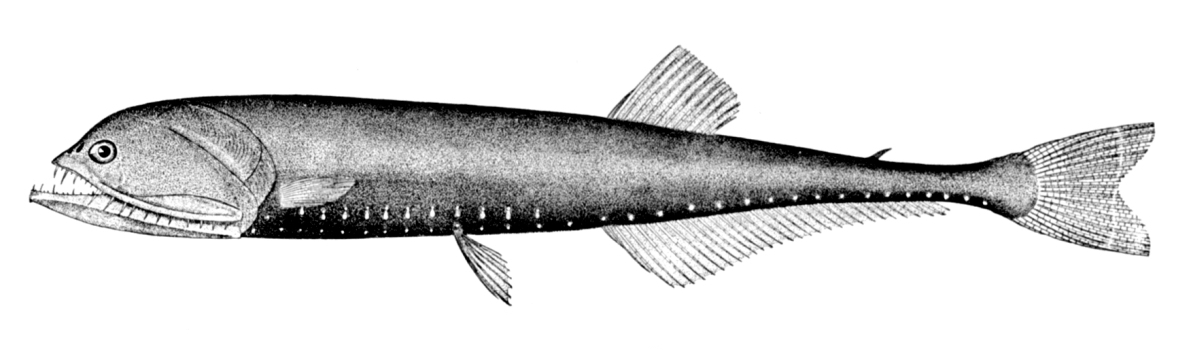
Elongated bristlemouth

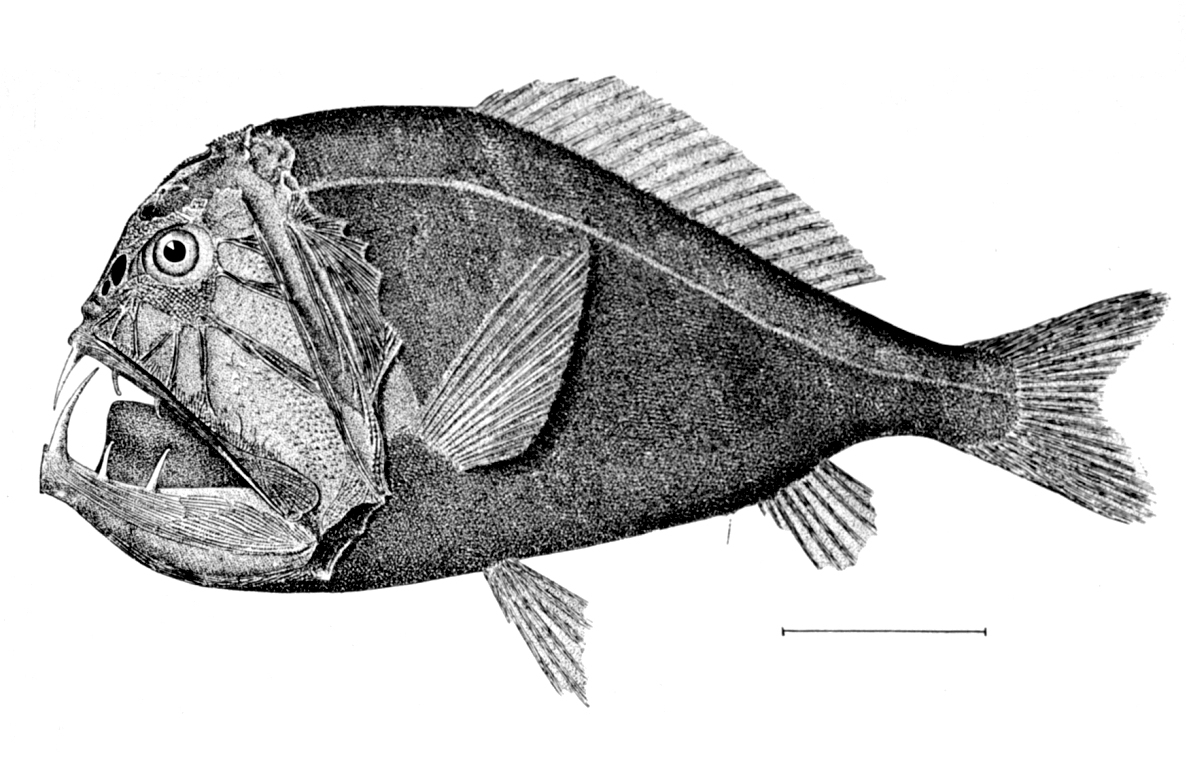
Fangtooth are indifferent swimmers who try to ambush their prey

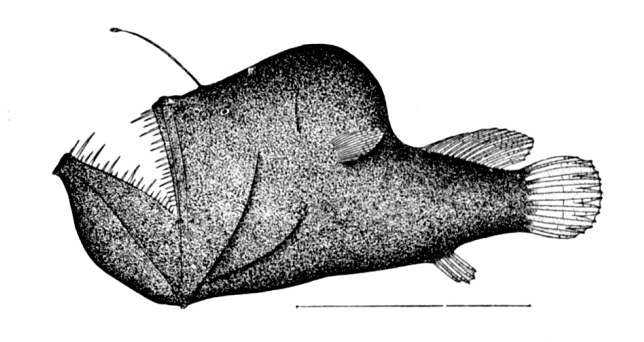
The first spine of the dorsal fin of anglerfish is modified like a fishing rod with a lure

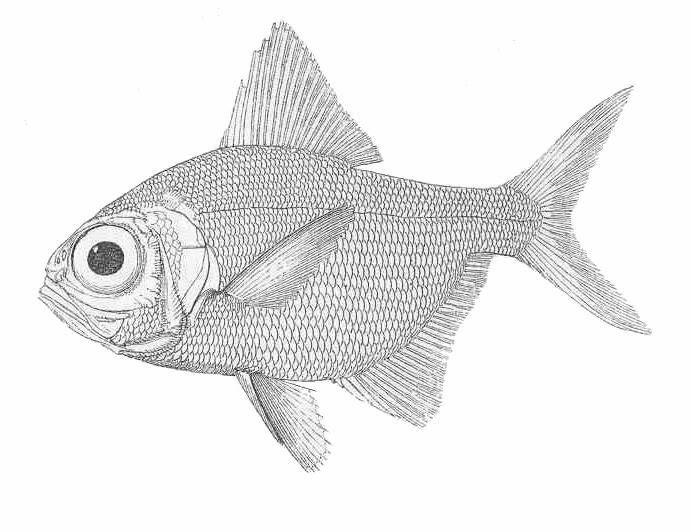
Alfonsino

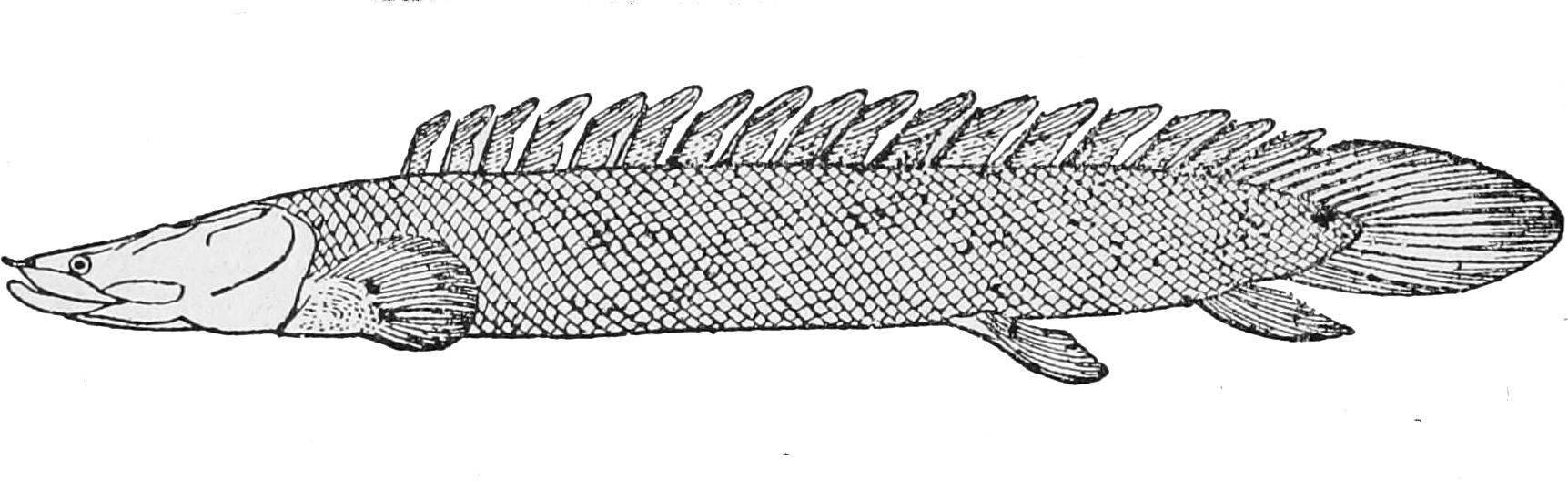
Bichirs and their relatives in the order Polypteriformes are sister to all other extant ray-fins; they possess lungs

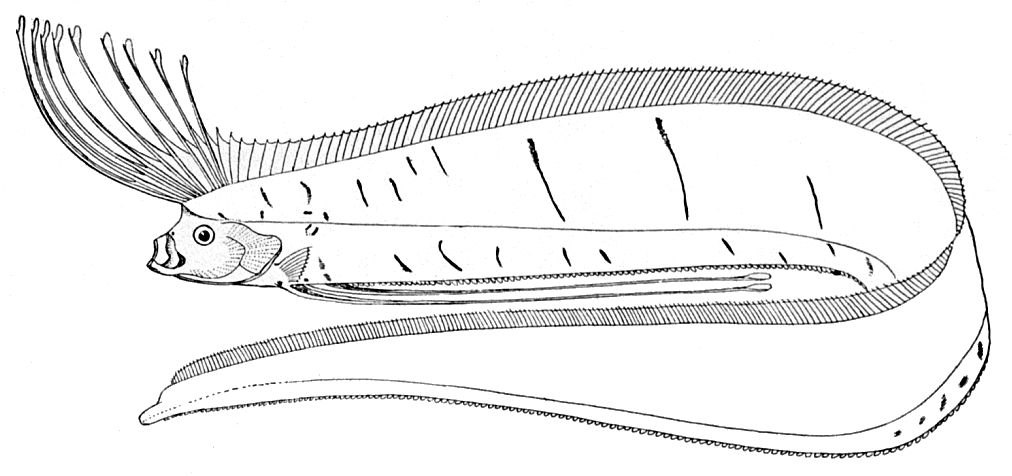
Giant oarfish

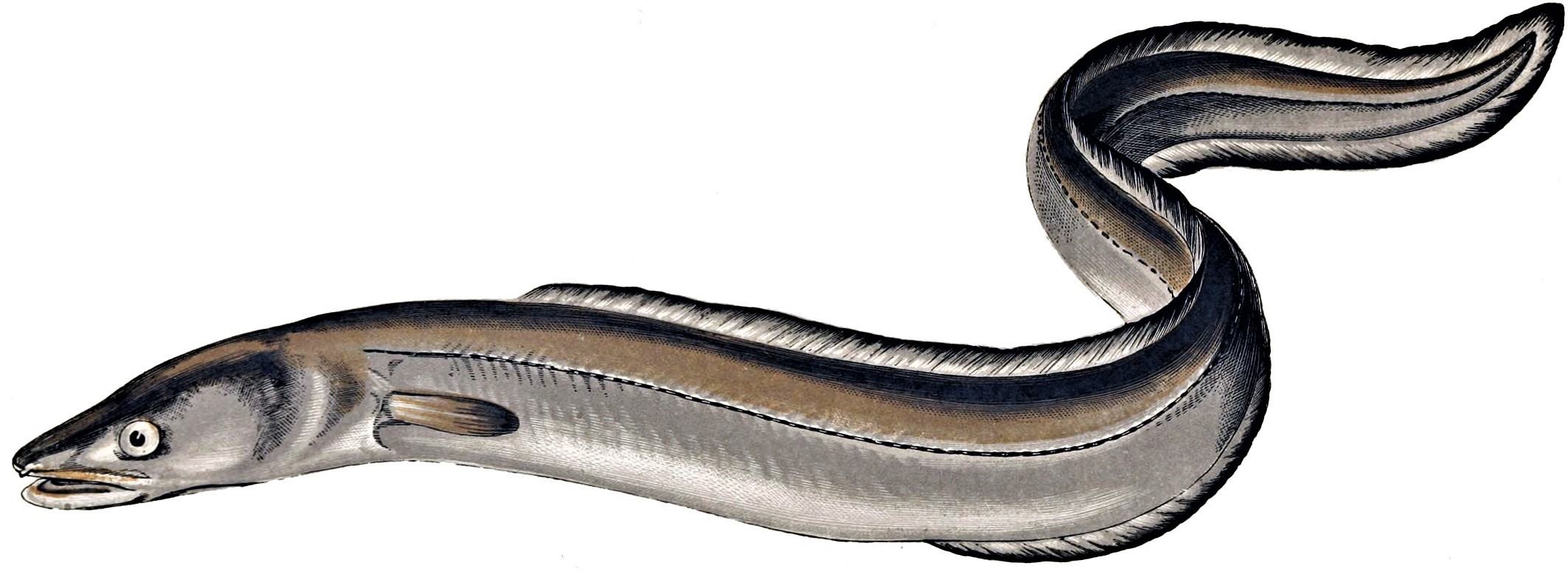
European conger are ray-finned fish

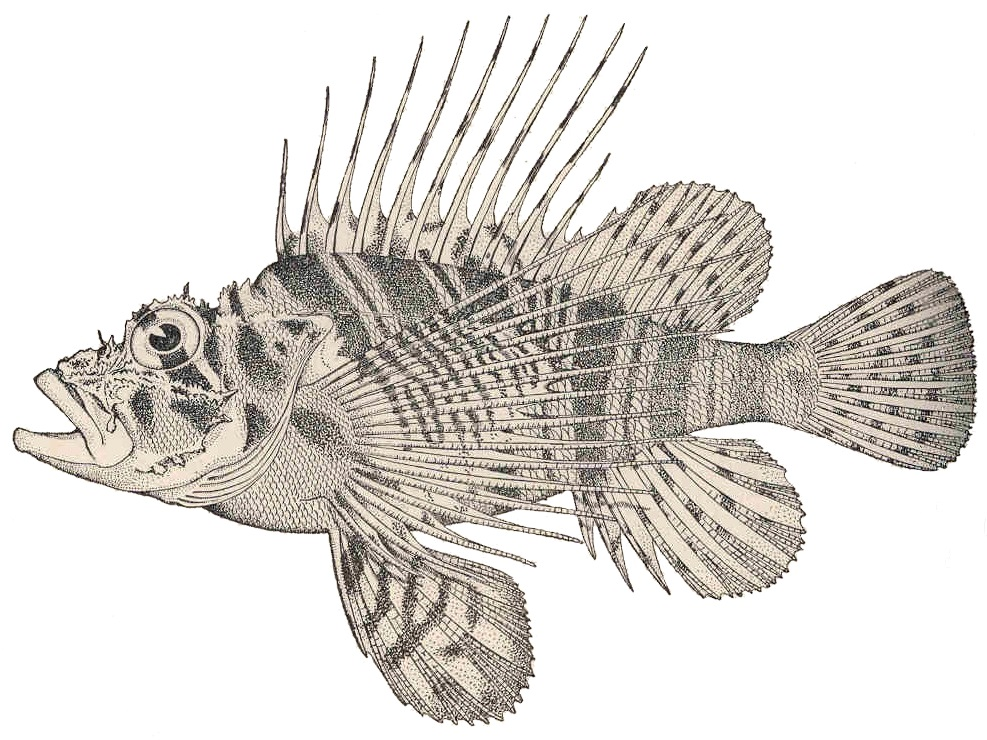
Hawaiian turkeyfish

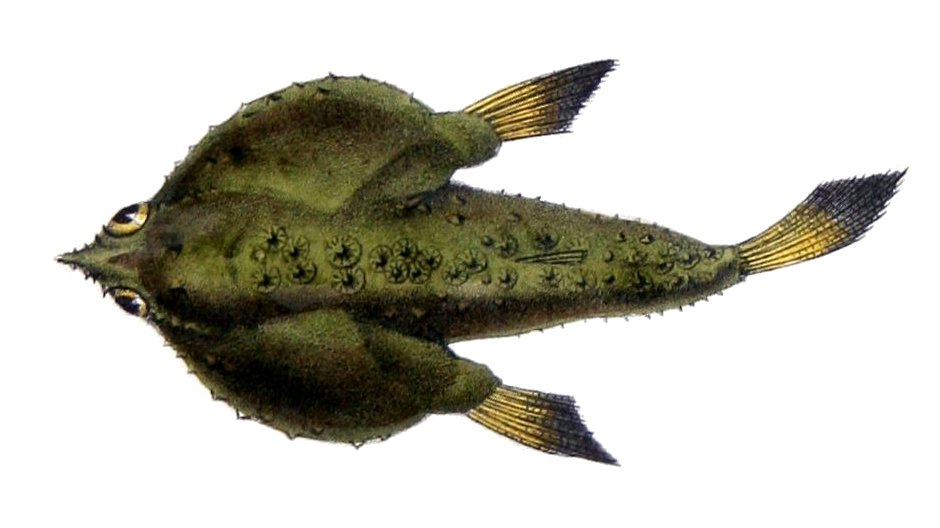
The benthic batfish Ogcocephalus notatus

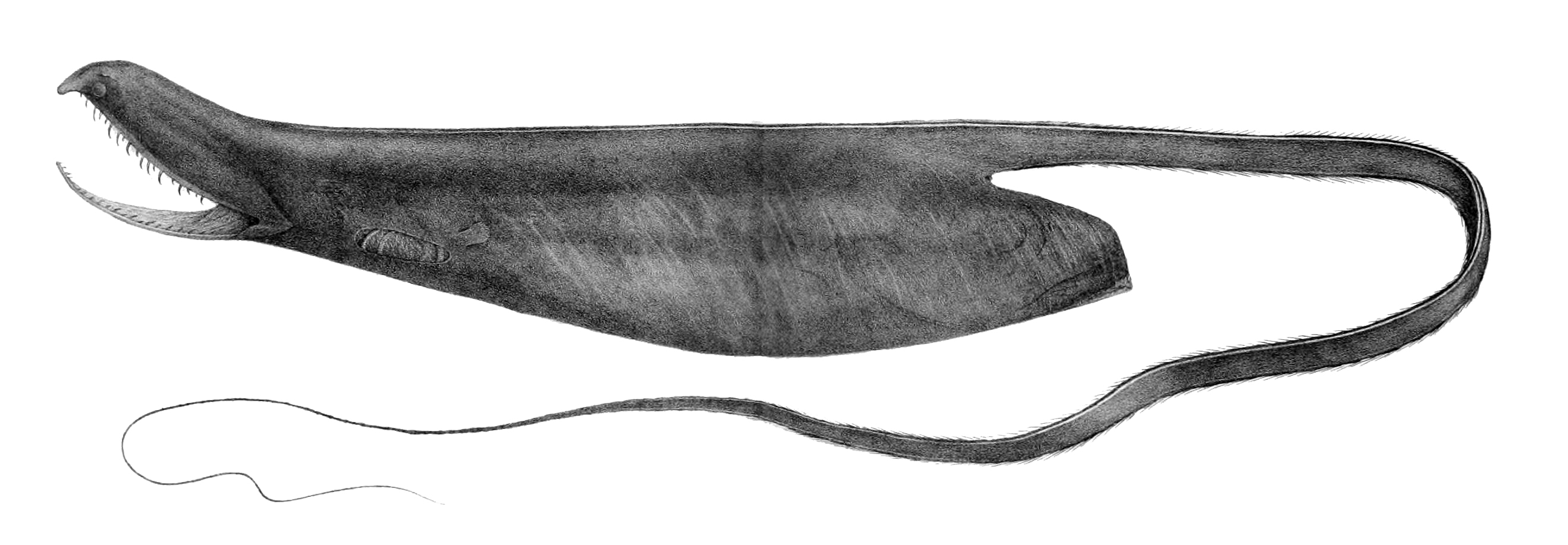
The deep sea eel Saccopharynx ampullaceus

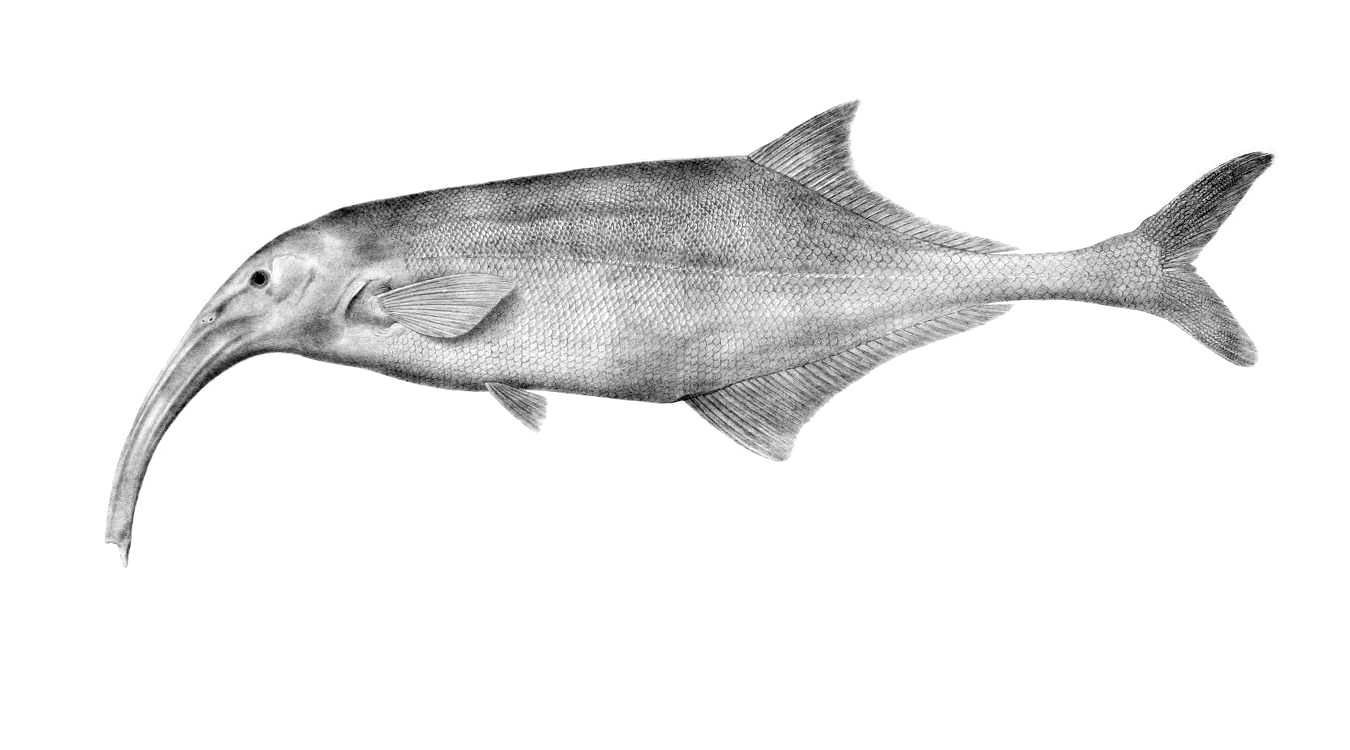
The freshwater elephant fish Campylomormyrus curvirostris

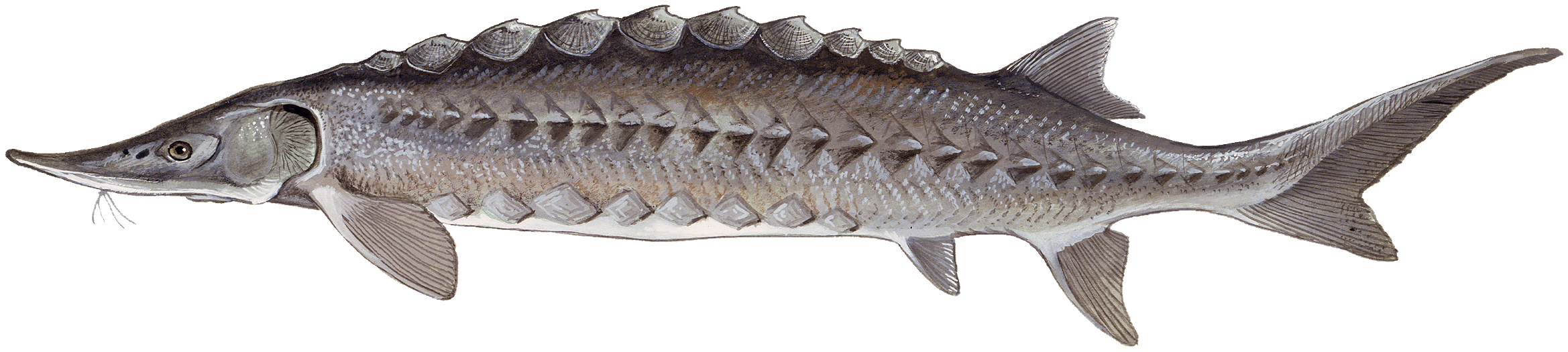
The sturgeon Acipenser oxyrhynchus has a cartilaginous endoskeleton

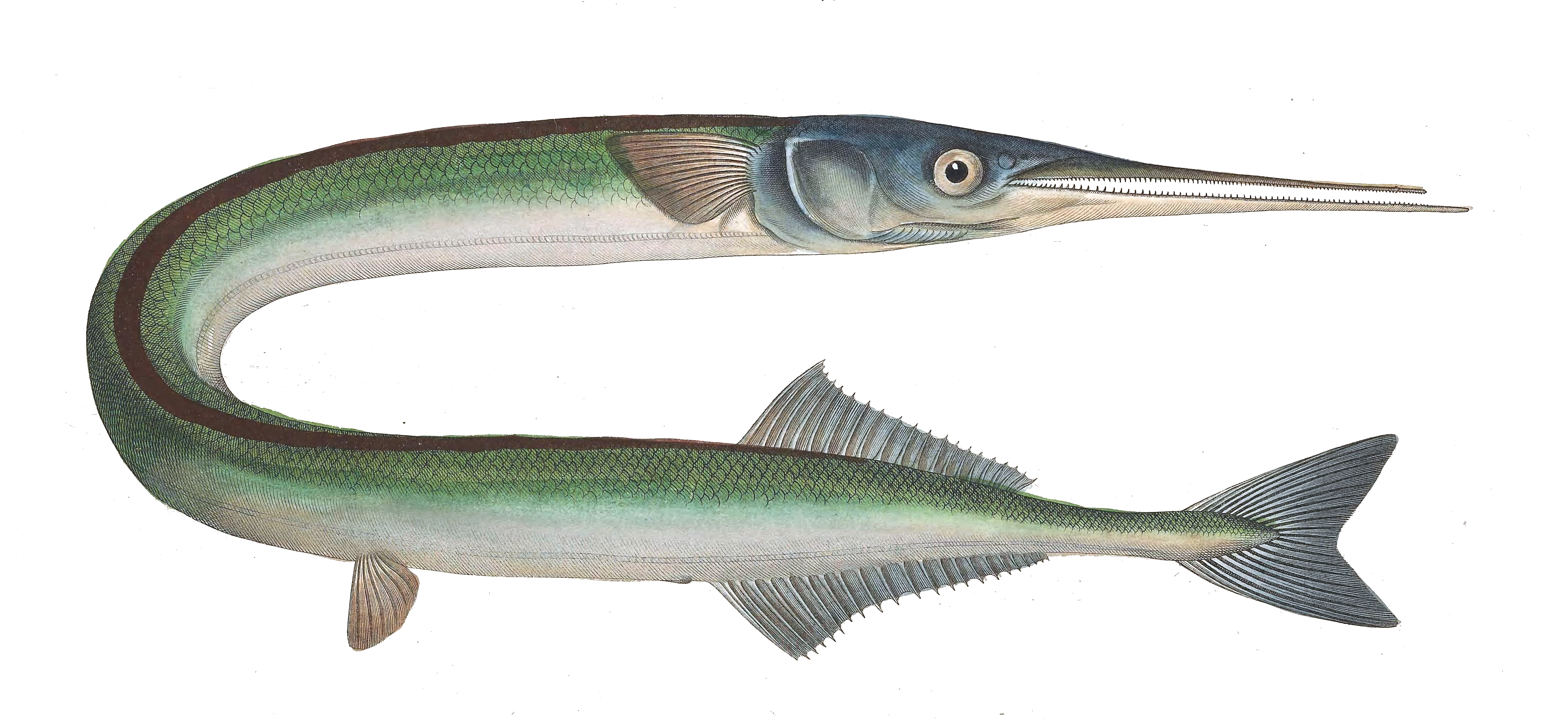
The ambush predator needlefish Belone belone

Seahorses are in the extended pipefish family

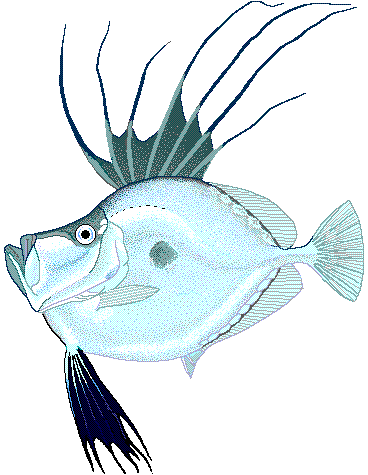
Mirror dory

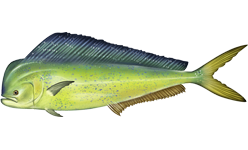
Mahi-mahi

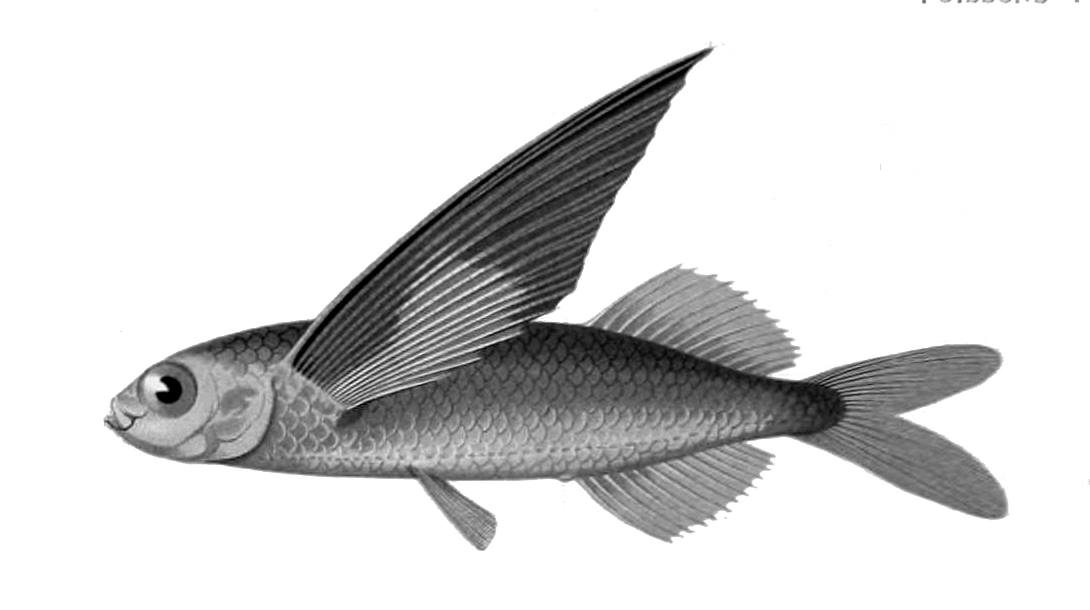
The "flying fish" Exocoetus obtusirostris has specialized pectoral fins for gliding

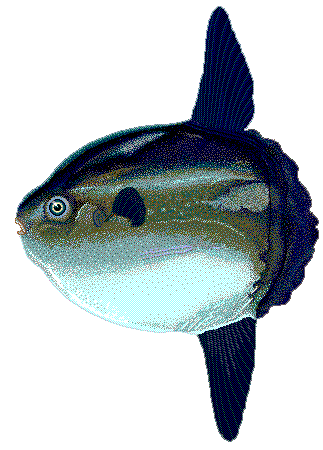
The hoodwinker sunfish Mola tecta has no caudal fin

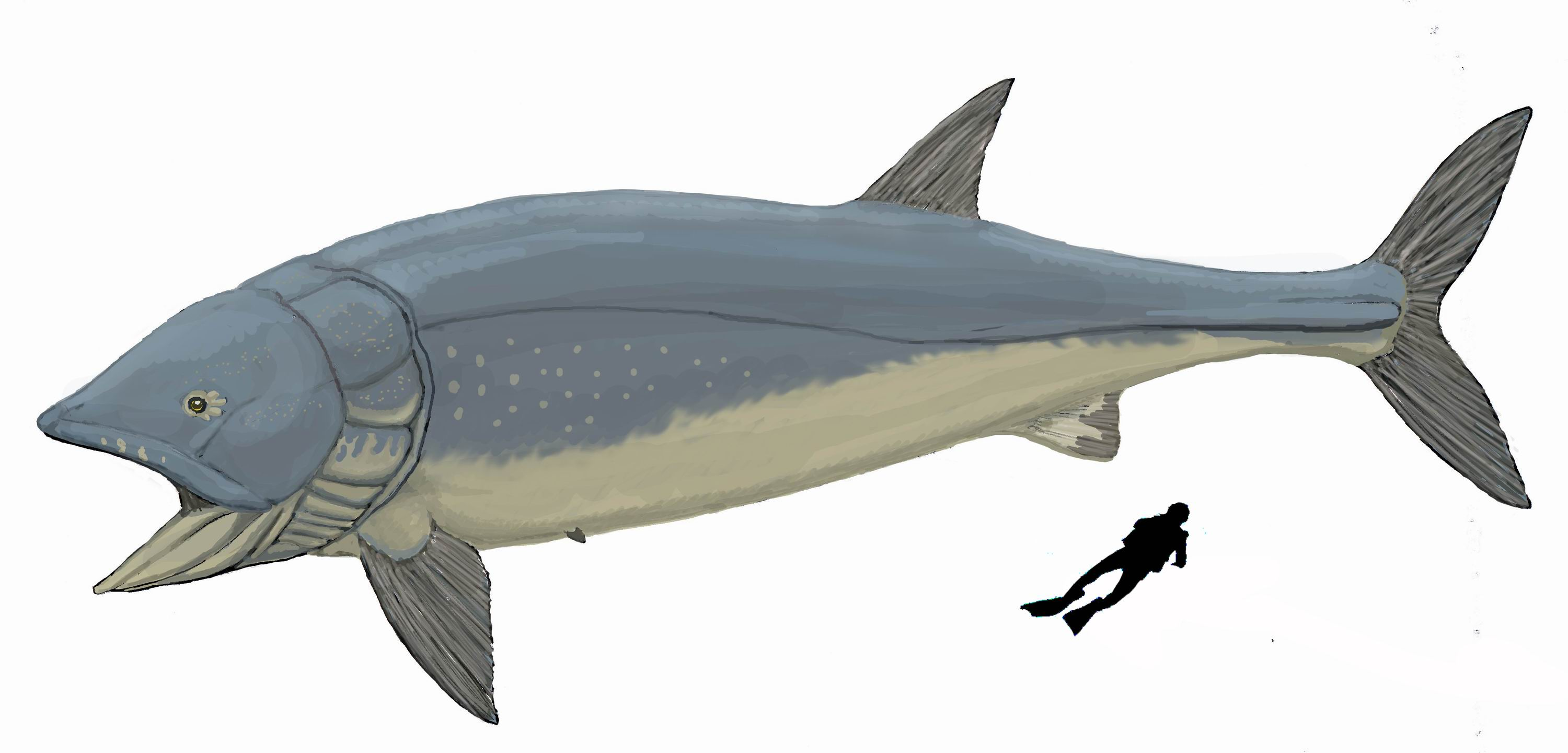
The Jurassic †Leedsichthys was a filter-feeder and the largest ray-finned fish to have ever lived

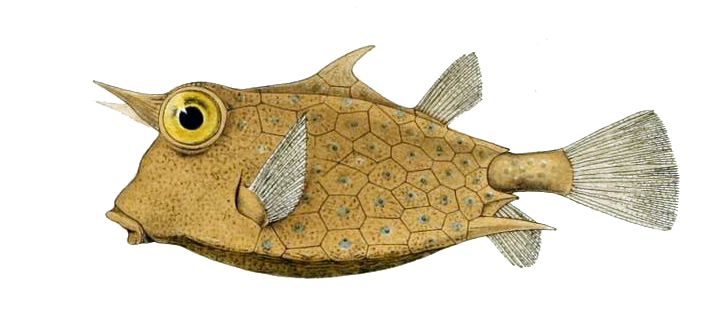
Lactoria fornasini is a poisonous species of boxfish

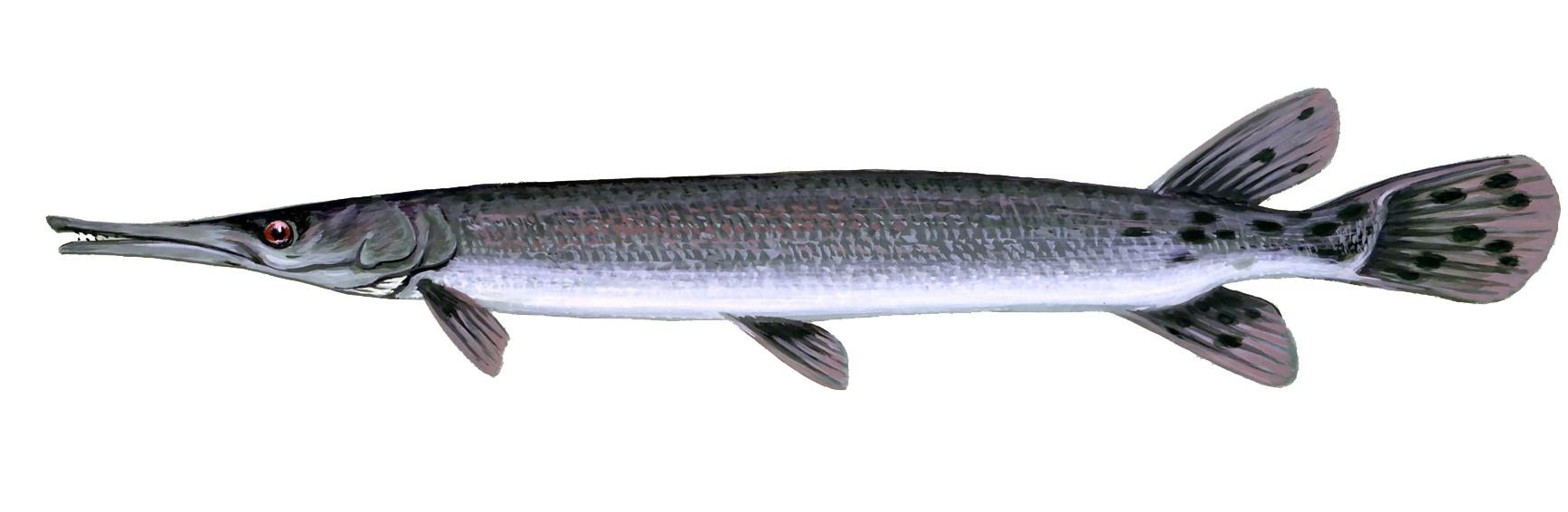
Gars (along with the bowfin) are the only surviving members of the Holostei

== Reproduction ==
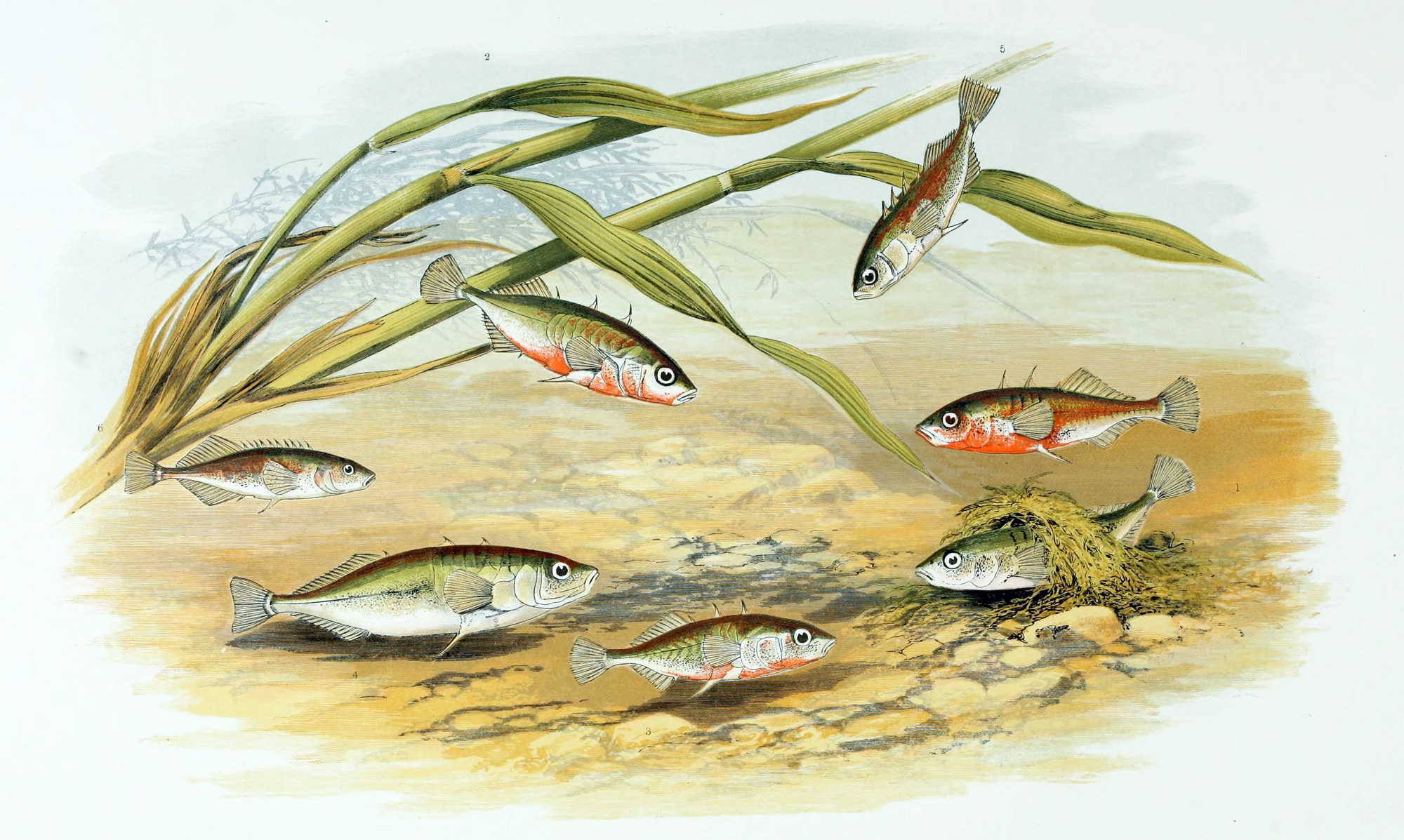
Three-spined stickleback (Gasterosteus aculeatus) males (red belly) build nests and compete to attract females to lay eggs in them. Males then defend and fan the eggs. Painting by Alexander Francis Lydon, 1879

In nearly all ray-finned fish, the sexes are separate, and in most species the females spawn eggs that are fertilized externally, typically with the male inseminating the eggs after they are laid. Development then proceeds with a free-swimming larval stage. However other patterns of ontogeny exist, with one of the commonest being sequential hermaphroditism. In most cases this involves protogyny, fish starting life as females and converting to males at some stage, triggered by some internal or external factor. Protandry, where a fish converts from male to female, is much less common than protogyny. Most families use external rather than internal fertilization. Of the oviparous teleosts, most (79%) do not provide parental care. Viviparity, ovoviviparity, or some form of parental care for eggs, whether by the male, the female, or both parents is seen in a significant fraction (21%) of the 422 teleost families; no care is likely the ancestral condition. The oldest case of viviparity in ray-finned fish is found in Middle Triassic species of †Saurichthys. Viviparity is relatively rare and is found in about 6% of living teleost species; male care is far more common than female care. Male territoriality "preadapts" a species for evolving male parental care. There are a few examples of fish that self-fertilise. The mangrove rivulus is an amphibious, simultaneous hermaphrodite, producing both eggs and spawn and having internal fertilisation. This mode of reproduction may be related to the fish's habit of spending long periods out of water in the mangrove forests it inhabits. Males are occasionally produced at temperatures below 19 °C (66 °F) and can fertilise eggs that are then spawned by the female. This maintains genetic variability in a species that is otherwise highly inbred.

== Classification and fossil record ==
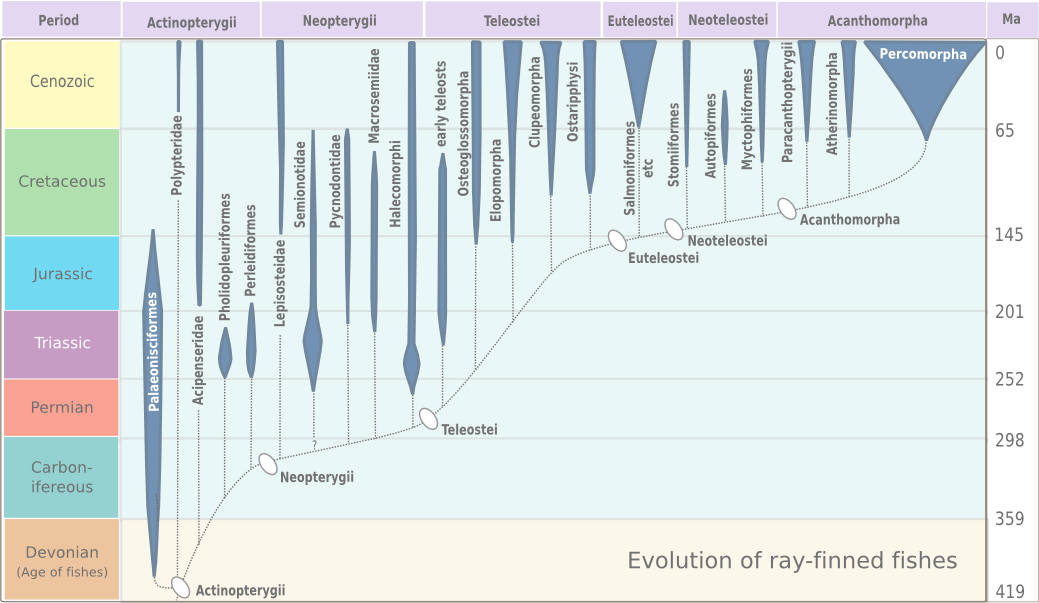

Actinopterygii is divided into the subclasses Cladistia, Chondrostei and Neopterygii. The Neopterygii, in turn, is divided into the infraclasses Holostei and Teleostei. During the Mesozoic (Triassic, Jurassic, Cretaceous) and Cenozoic the teleosts in particular diversified widely. As a result, 96% of living fish species are teleosts (40% of all fish species belong to the teleost subgroup Acanthomorpha), while all other groups of actinopterygians represent depauperate lineages. The classification of ray-finned fishes can be summarized as follows:

- Cladistia, which include bichirs and reedfish
- Actinopteri, which include:
  - Chondrostei, which include Acipenseriformes (paddlefishes and sturgeons)
  - Neopterygii, which include:
    - Teleostei (most living fishes)
    - Holostei, which include:
      - Lepisosteiformes (gars)
      - Amiiformes (bowfin)

The cladogram below shows the main clades of living actinopterygians and their evolutionary relationships to other extant groups of fishes and the four-limbed vertebrates (tetrapods). The latter include mostly terrestrial species but also groups that became secondarily aquatic (e.g. whales and dolphins). Tetrapods evolved from a group of bony fish during the Devonian period. Approximate divergence dates for the different actinopterygian clades (in millions of years, mya) are from Near et al., 2012.

- Vertebrates
  - Jawless fishes (hagfish, lampreys)
  - Jawed vertebrates
    - Cartilaginous fishes (sharks, rays, ratfish)
    - Euteleostomi ('bony fish')
      - Sarcopterygii (lobe‑fins)
        - Actinistia
          Coelacanths
        - Rhipidistia
          - Lungfish
          - Tetrapods
            - Amphibians
            - Amniota
              - Mammals
              - Sauropsids (reptiles, birds)
      - Actinopterygii 400 mya
        - Cladistia
          Polypteriformes (bichirs, reedfishes)
        - Actinopteri
          - Chondrostei
            Acipenseriformes (sturgeons, paddlefishes)
          - Neopterygii 360 mya
            - 310 mya
              Teleostei
            - Holostei 275 mya
              - Amiiformes (bowfins)
              - Lepisosteiformes (gars)

The polypterids (bichirs and reedfish) are the sister lineage of all other actinopterygians, the Acipenseriformes (sturgeons and paddlefishes) are the sister lineage of Neopterygii, and Holostei (bowfin and gars) are the sister lineage of teleosts. The teleost clade Oseanacephala, including Elopomorpha (eels and tarpons) and Osteoglossomorpha, appears to be the sister lineage of all other teleosts (Clupeocephala). The earliest known fossil actinopterygian might be Andreolepis hedei, dating back 420 million years (Late Silurian), remains of which have been found in Russia, Sweden, and Estonia. Crown group actinopterygians most likely originated near the Devonian-Carboniferous boundary. The earliest fossil relatives of modern teleosts are from the Triassic period (Prohalecites, Pholidophorus), and the molecular clock also supports a Triassic age for the teleost crown group.

Cladistia	Senegal bichir	Cladistia includes only one living family, Polypteridae (bichirs and reedfish). They live in freshwater environments in Africa and possess two ventral lungs instead of a dorsal swim bladder. The scales are ganoid (as in Chondrostei and Holostei). The dorsal fin is divided into multiple finlets, the pectoral fins are lobe-like (somewhat similar to those of the Sarcopterygii), and the caudal fin has a modified heterocercal shape (resembling the Holostei). The order Polypteriformes had been classified as Sarcopterygii and as Chondrostei in the past due to certain primitive features it shares with those groups. The earliest fossils of Cladistia date to the Late Cretaceous.
Chondrostei	Atlantic sturgeon	Chondrostei (cartilage bone) is a subclass of primarily cartilaginous fish showing some ossification. The current circumscription of this group includes only one living order: Acipenseriformes (sturgeons and paddlefishes). It is thought that the chondrosteans evolved from bony fish but lost the bony hardening of their cartilaginous skeletons, resulting in a lightening of the frame. Elderly chondrosteans show beginnings of ossification of the skeleton, suggesting that this process is delayed rather than lost in these fish. This group had once been classified with the sharks: the similarities are obvious, as not only do the chondrosteans mostly lack bone, but the structure of the jaw is more akin to that of sharks than other bony fish, and both lack scales. Additional shared features include spiracles and, in sturgeons, a heterocercal tail (the vertebrae extend into the larger lobe of the caudal fin). However the fossil record suggests that these fish have more in common with the Teleostei than their external appearance might suggest.
Neopterygii	Atlantic salmon	Neopterygii (new fins) is a subclass of ray-finned fish that possibly appeared somewhere in the Late Permian. Stem-neopterygians such as the guildayichthyids date to the Carboniferous. Neopterygians are a very successful group of fishes because they can move more rapidly than their ancestors. Their scales and skeletons began to lighten during their evolution, and their jaws became more powerful and efficient. While electroreception and the ampullae of Lorenzini is present in all other groups of fish, with the exception of hagfish, neopterygians have lost this sense, though it later re-evolved within Gymnotiformes and catfishes, who possess nonhomologous teleost ampullae.

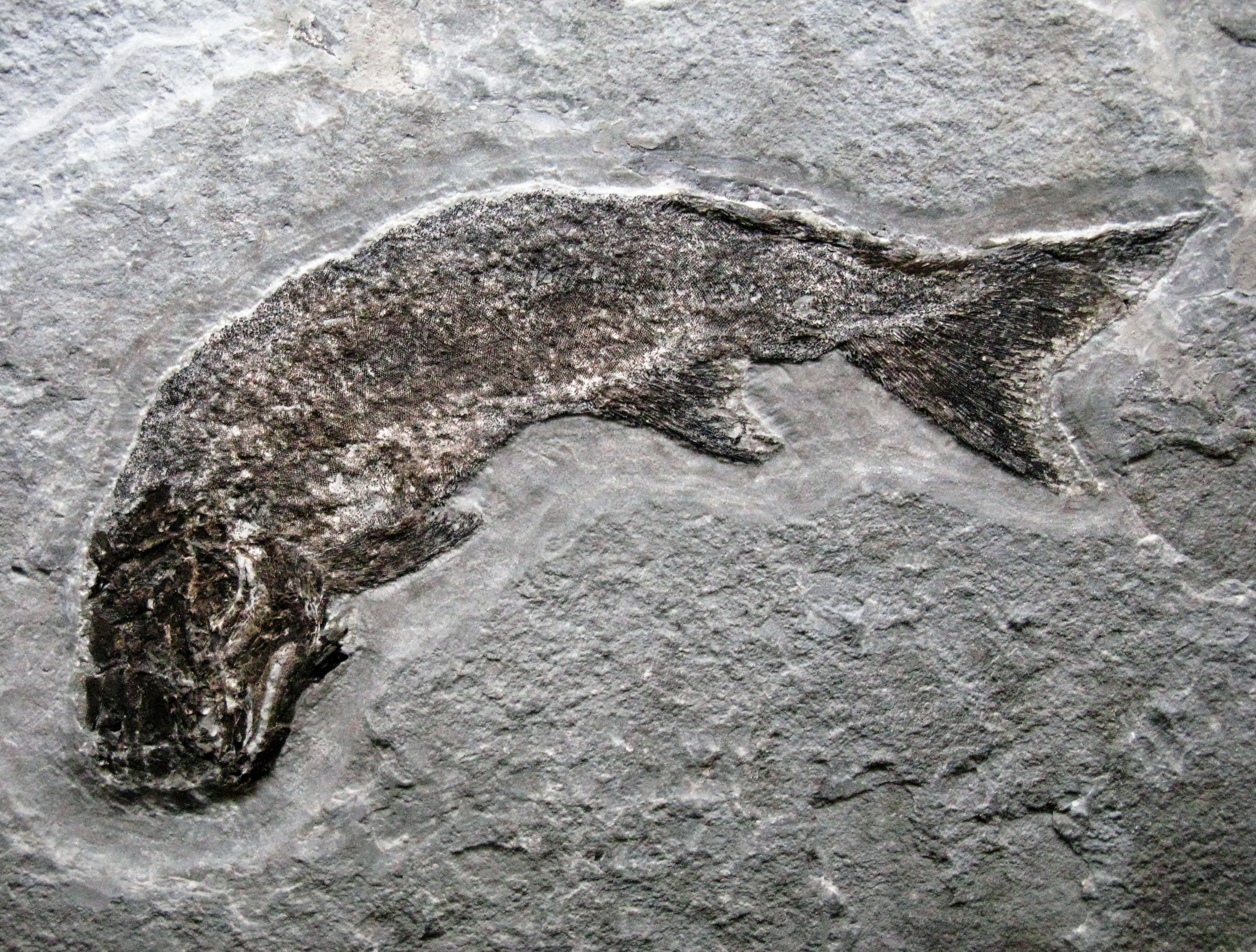
Fossil of the Devonian †cheirolepidiform †Cheirolepis canadensis

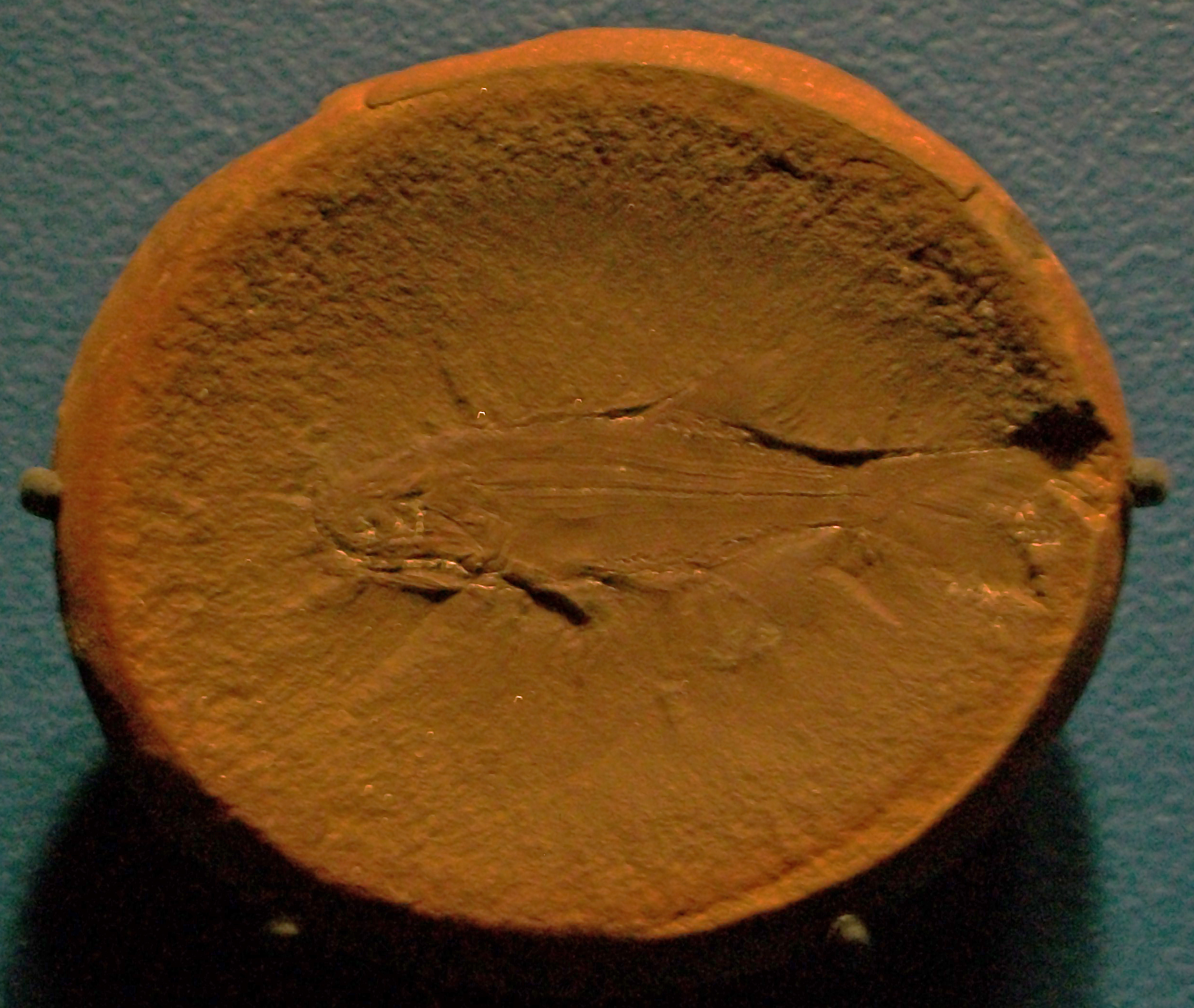
Fossil of the Carboniferous †elonichthyiform †Elonichthys peltigerus

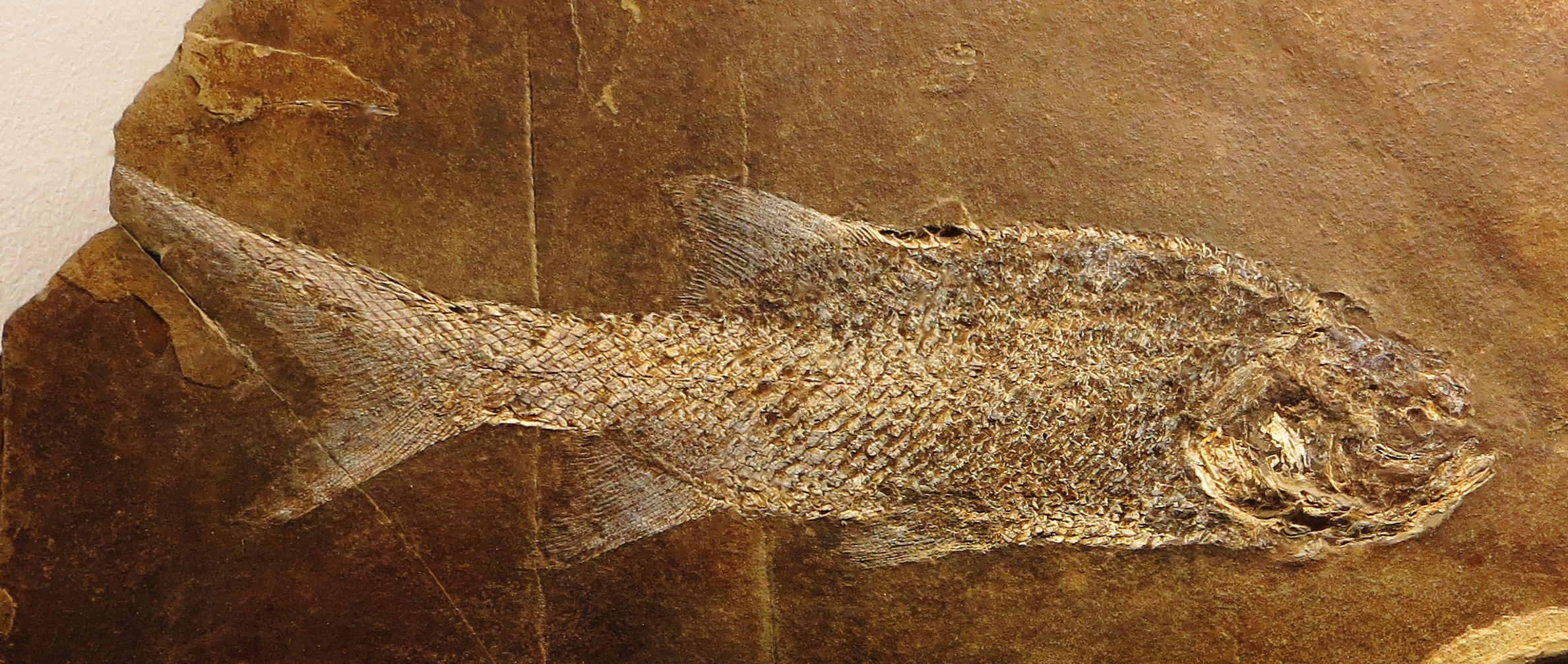
Fossil of the Permian †aeduelliform †Aeduella blainvillei

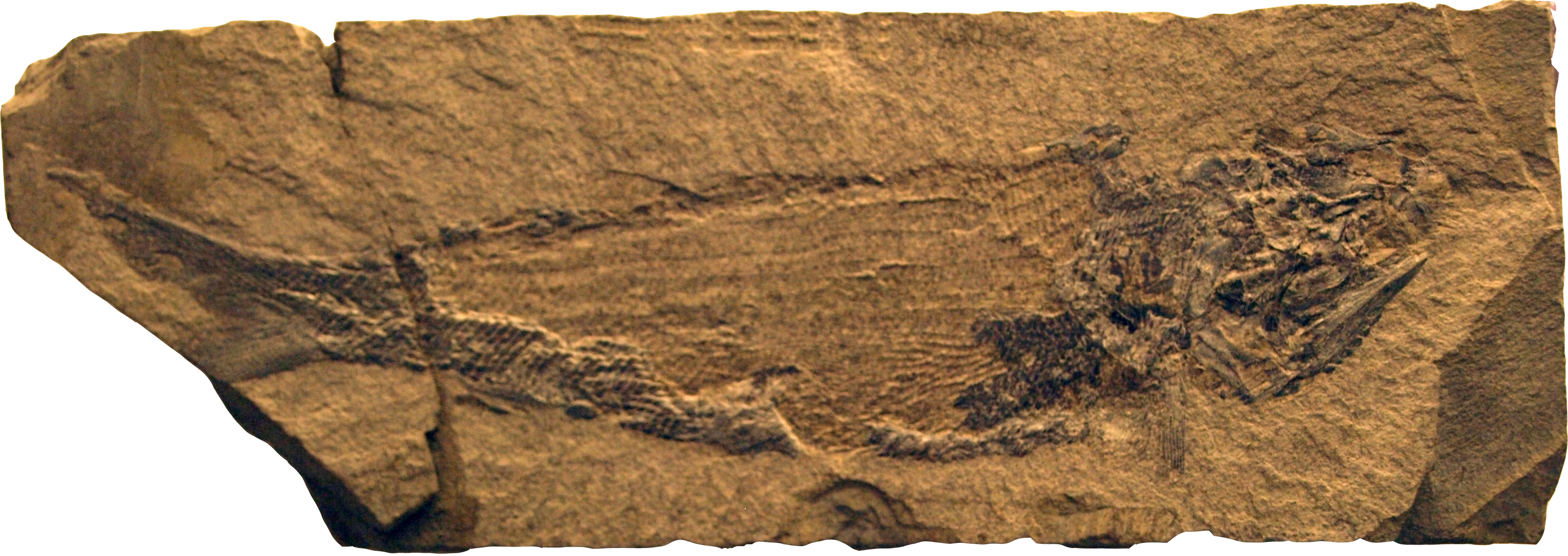
Fossil of the Permian †palaeonisciform †Palaeoniscum freieslebeni

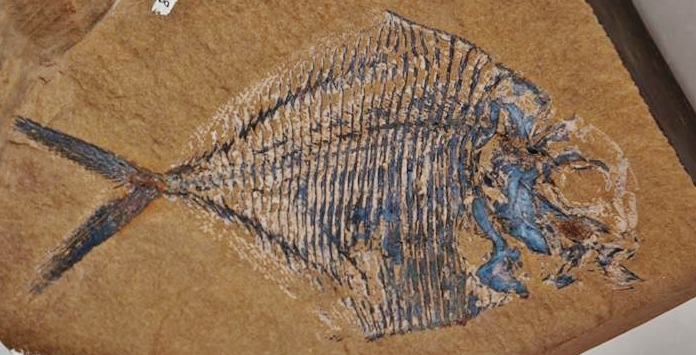
Fossil of the Triassic †bobasatraniiform †Bobasatrania canadensis

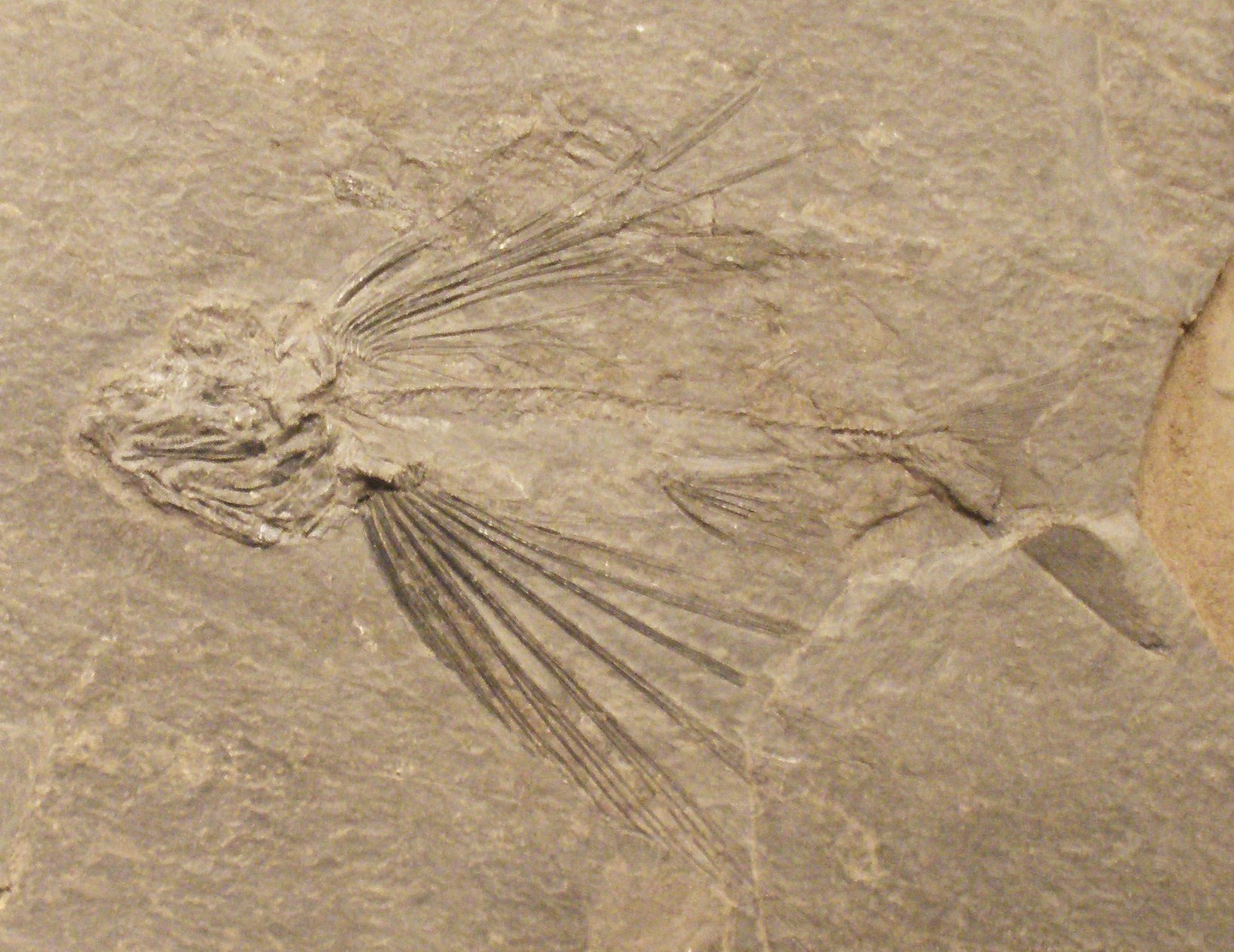
Fossil of the Triassic †perleidiform †Thoracopterus magnificus

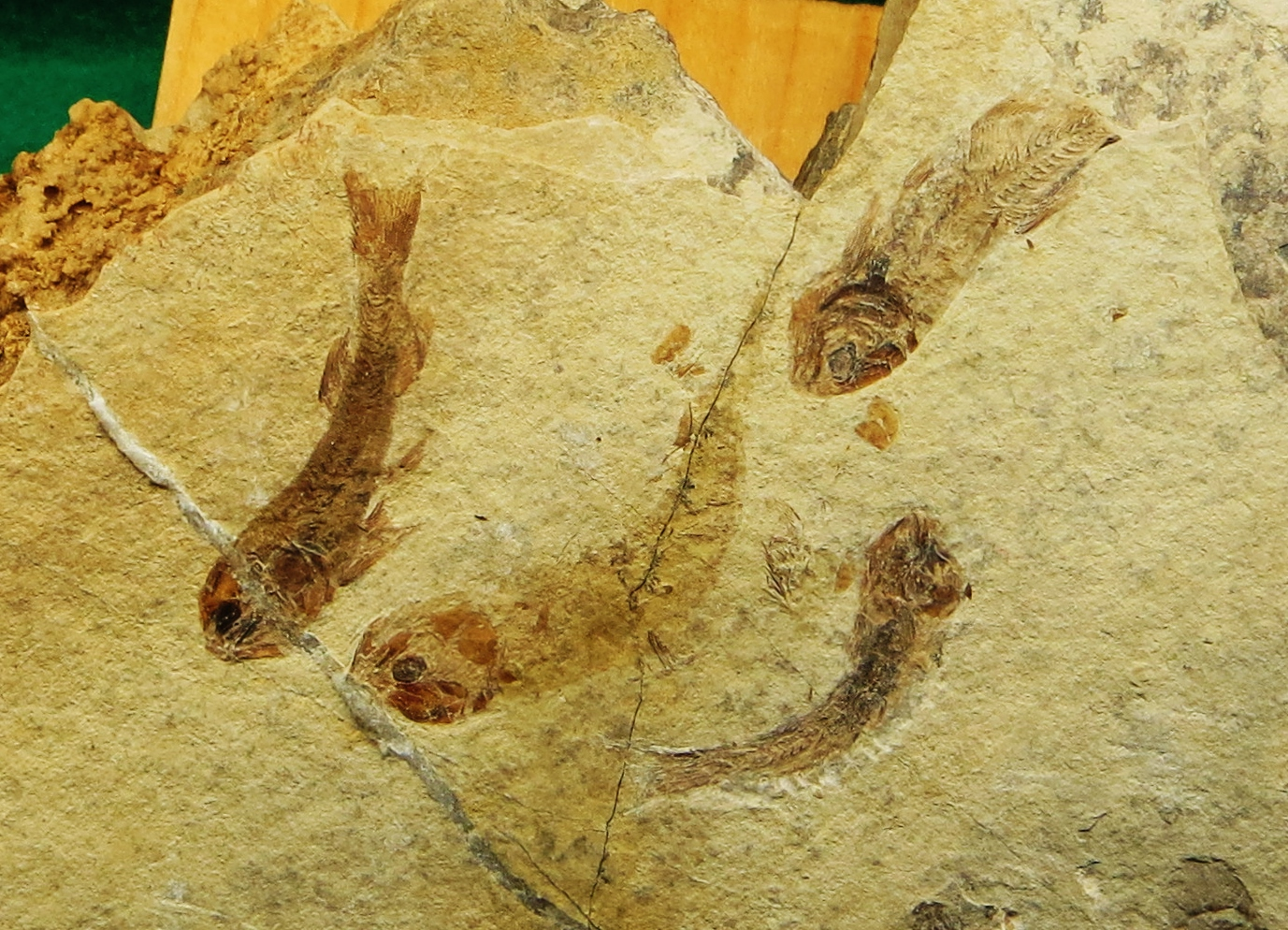
Fossils of the Triassic †prohaleciteiform †Prohalecites sp., the earliest teleosteomorph

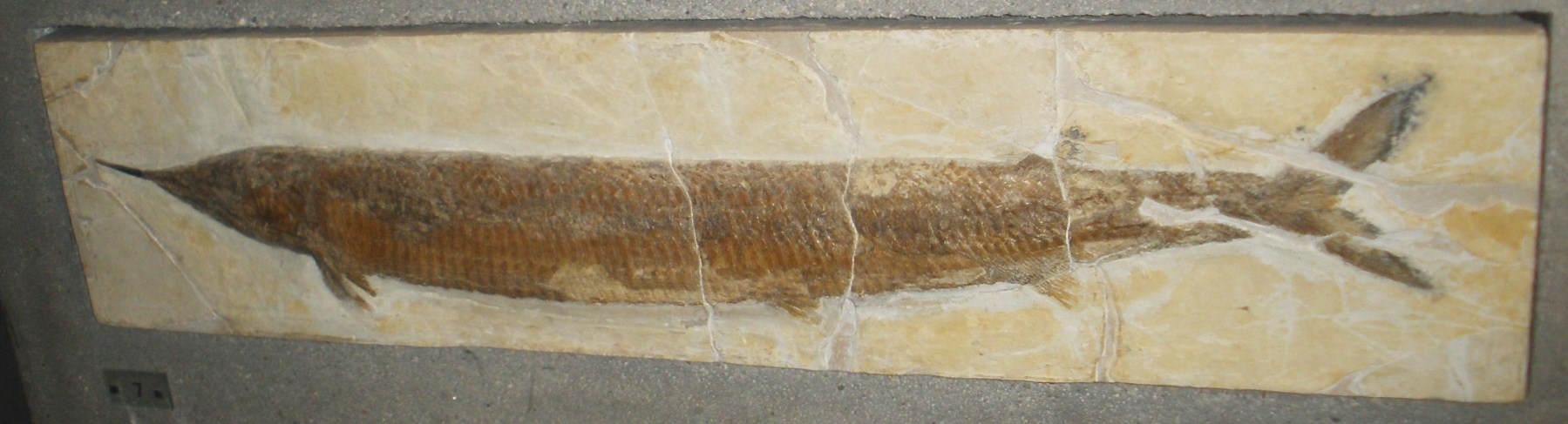
Fossil of the Jurassic †aspidorhynchiform †Aspidorhynchus sp.

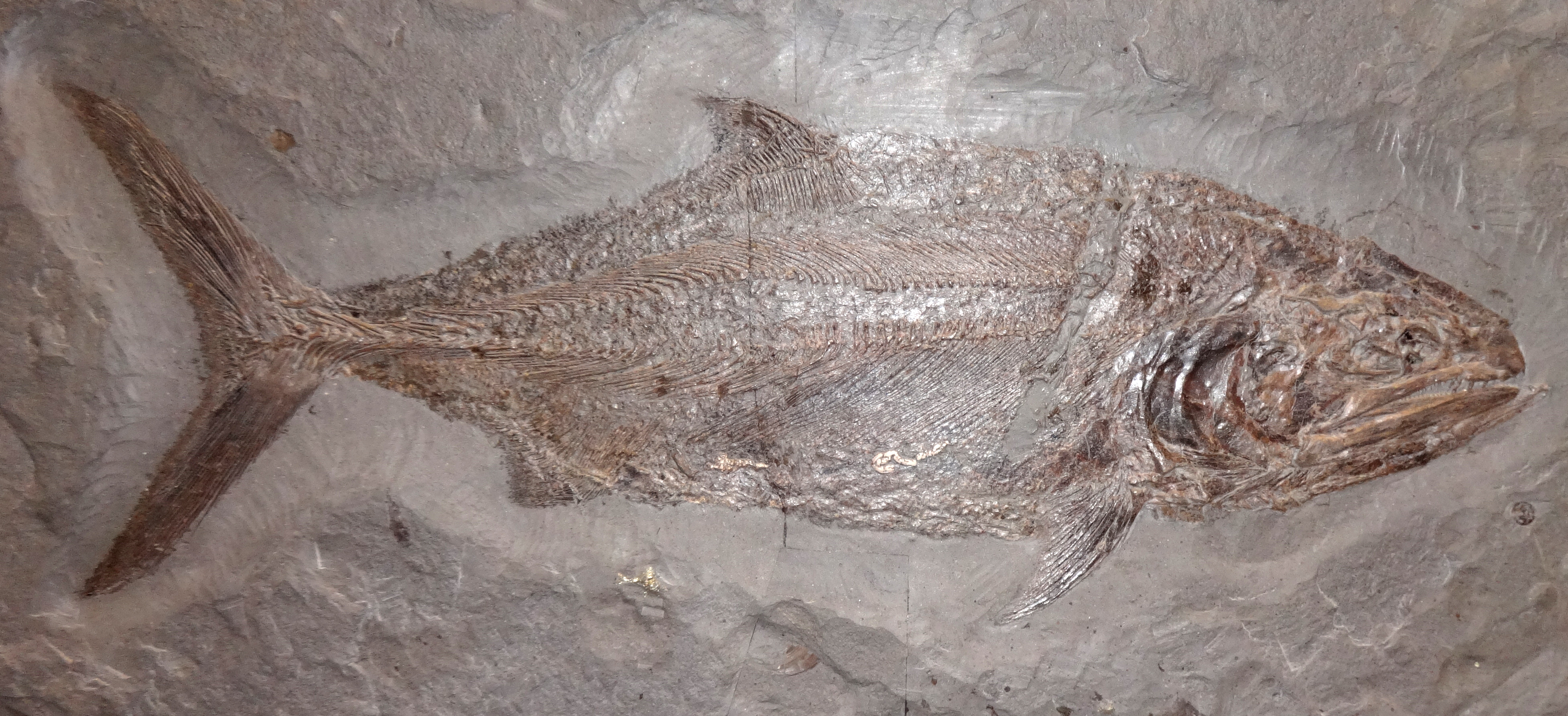
Fossil of the Jurassic †pachycormiform †Pachycormus curtus

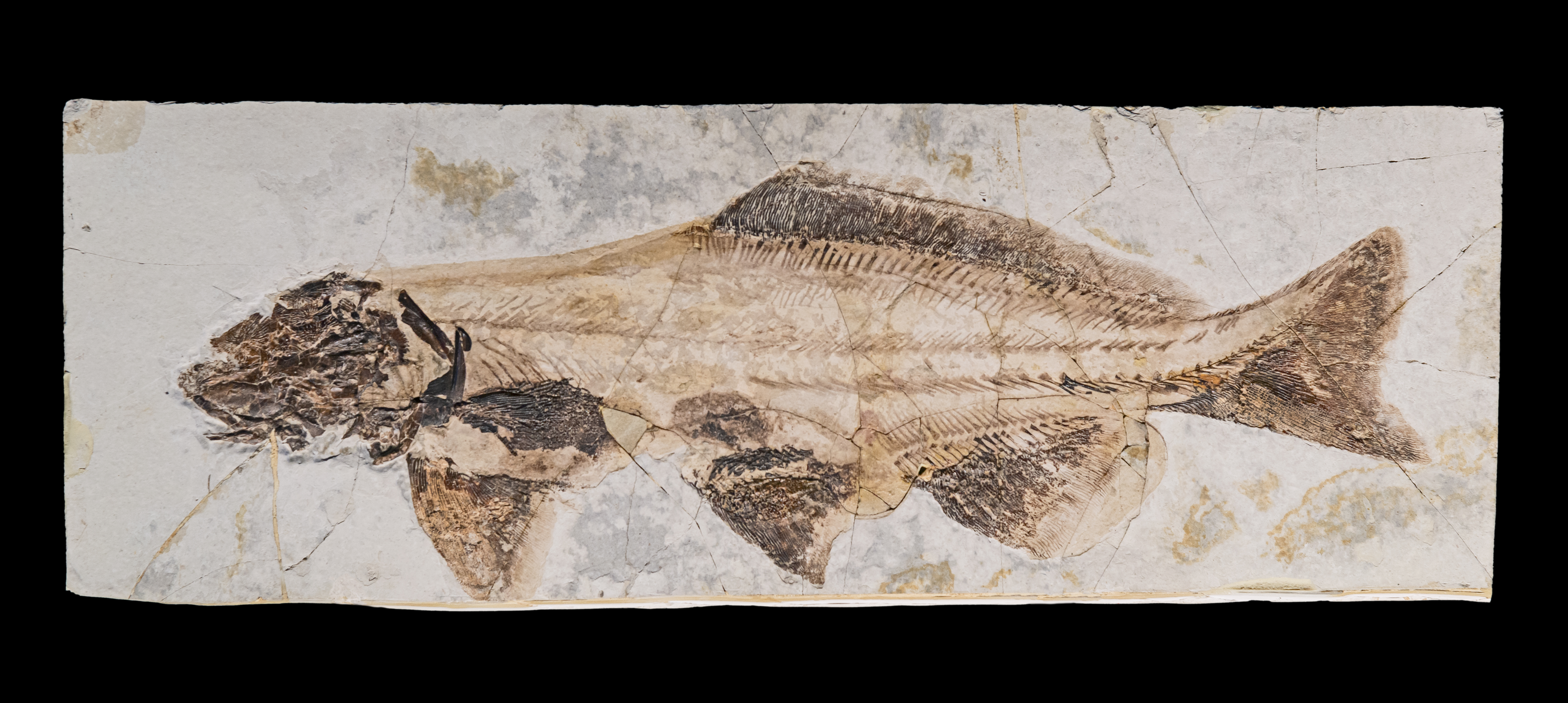
Fossil of the Cretaceous acipenseriform †Yanosteus longidorsalis

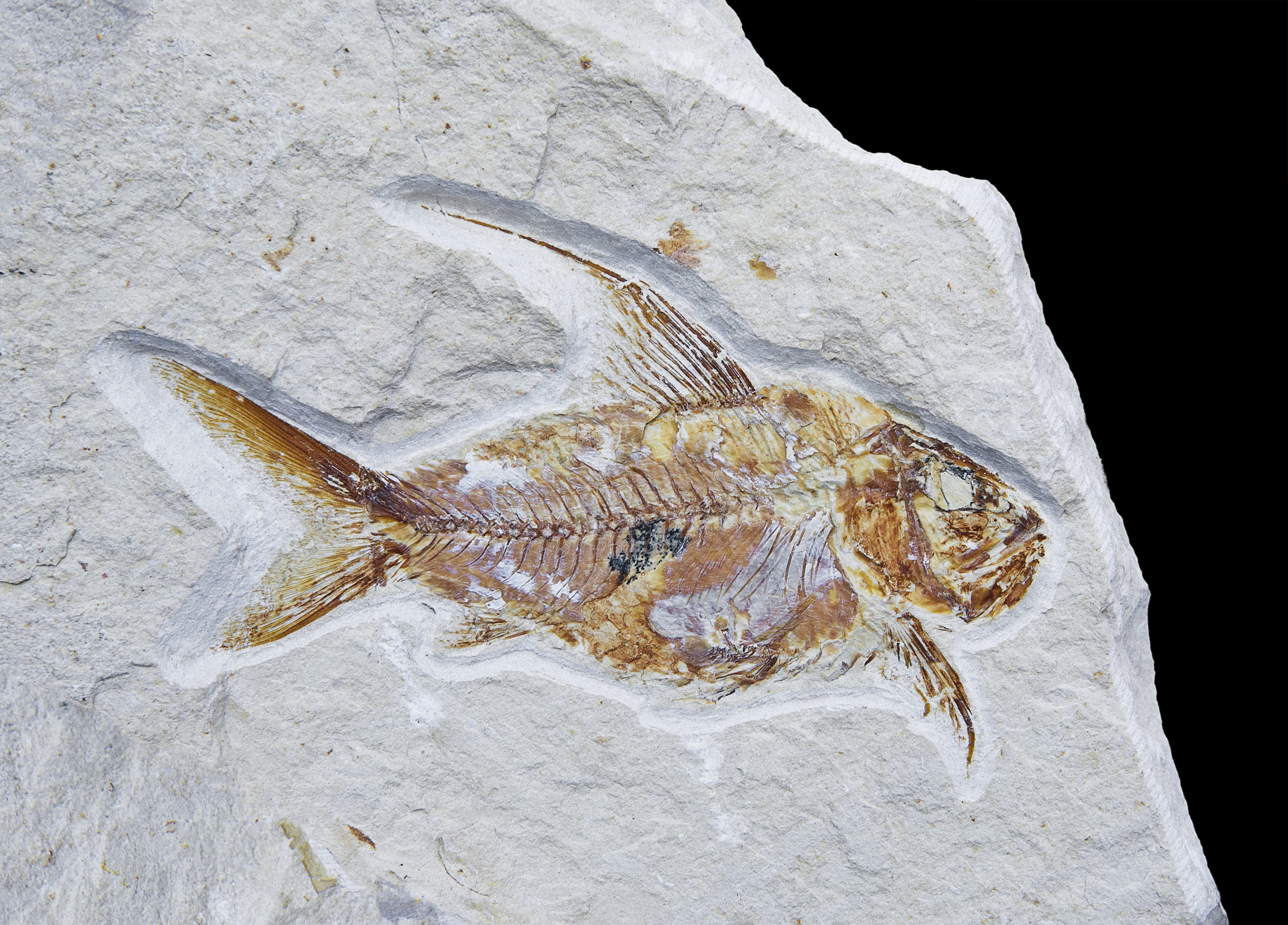
Fossil of the Cretaceous aulopiform †Nematonotus longispinus

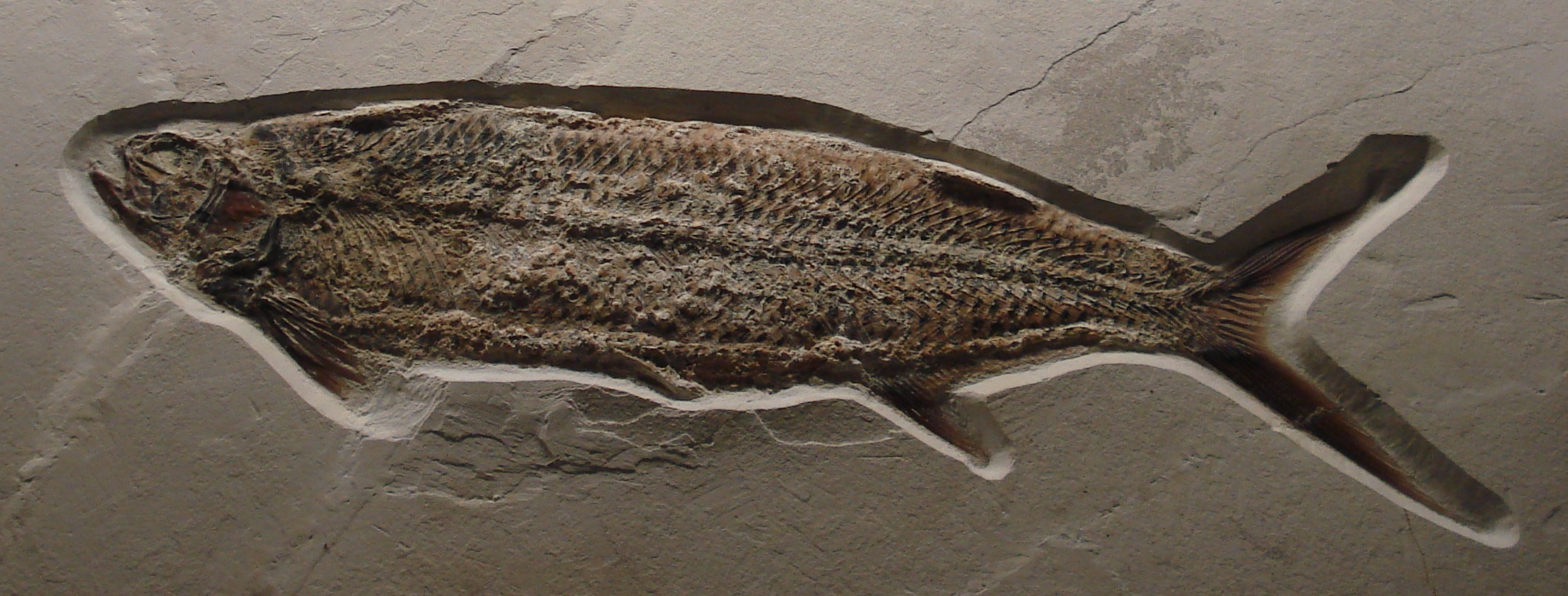
Fossil of the Cretaceous †ichthyodectiform †Thrissops formosus

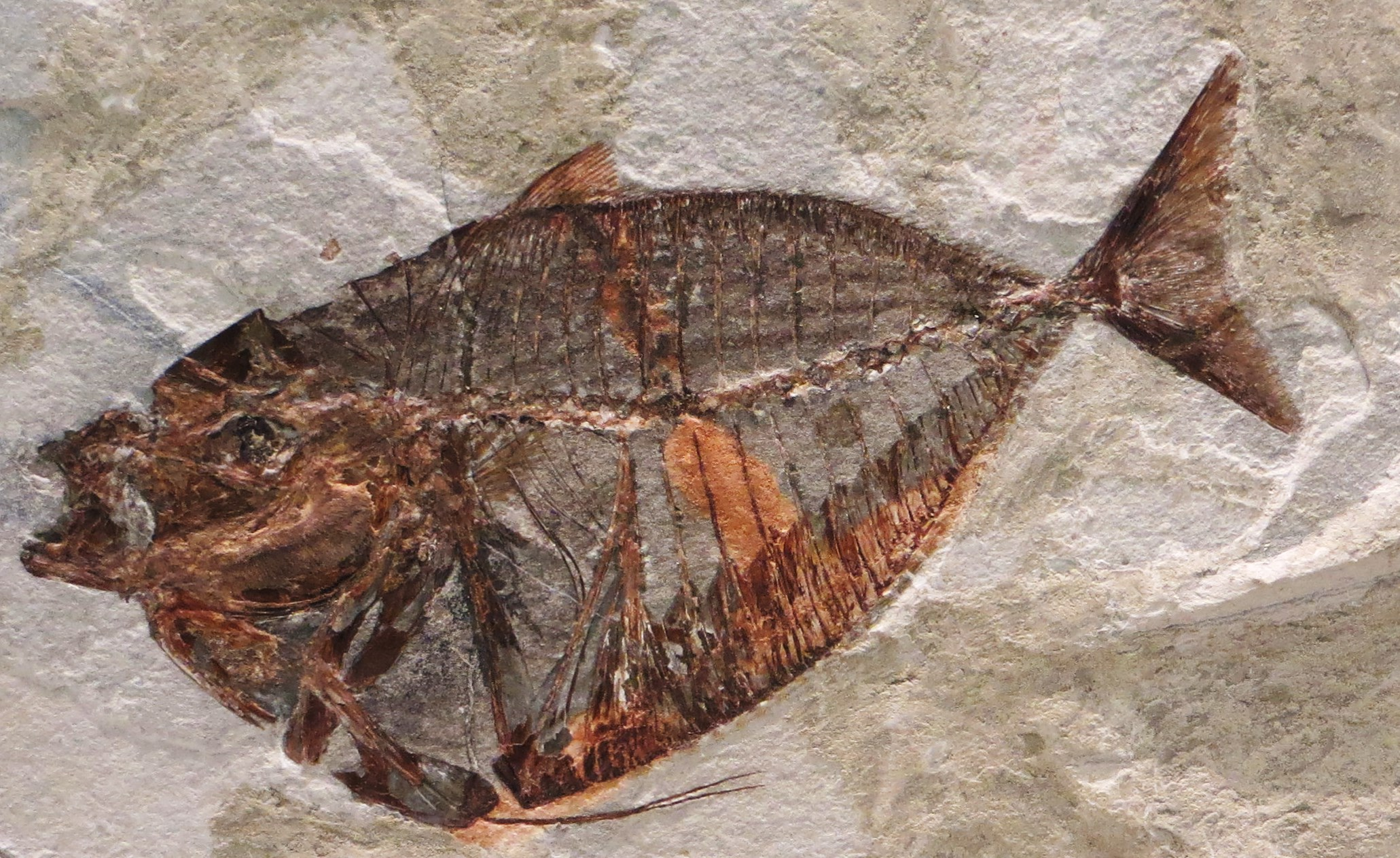
Fossil of the Eocene carangiform †Mene oblonga

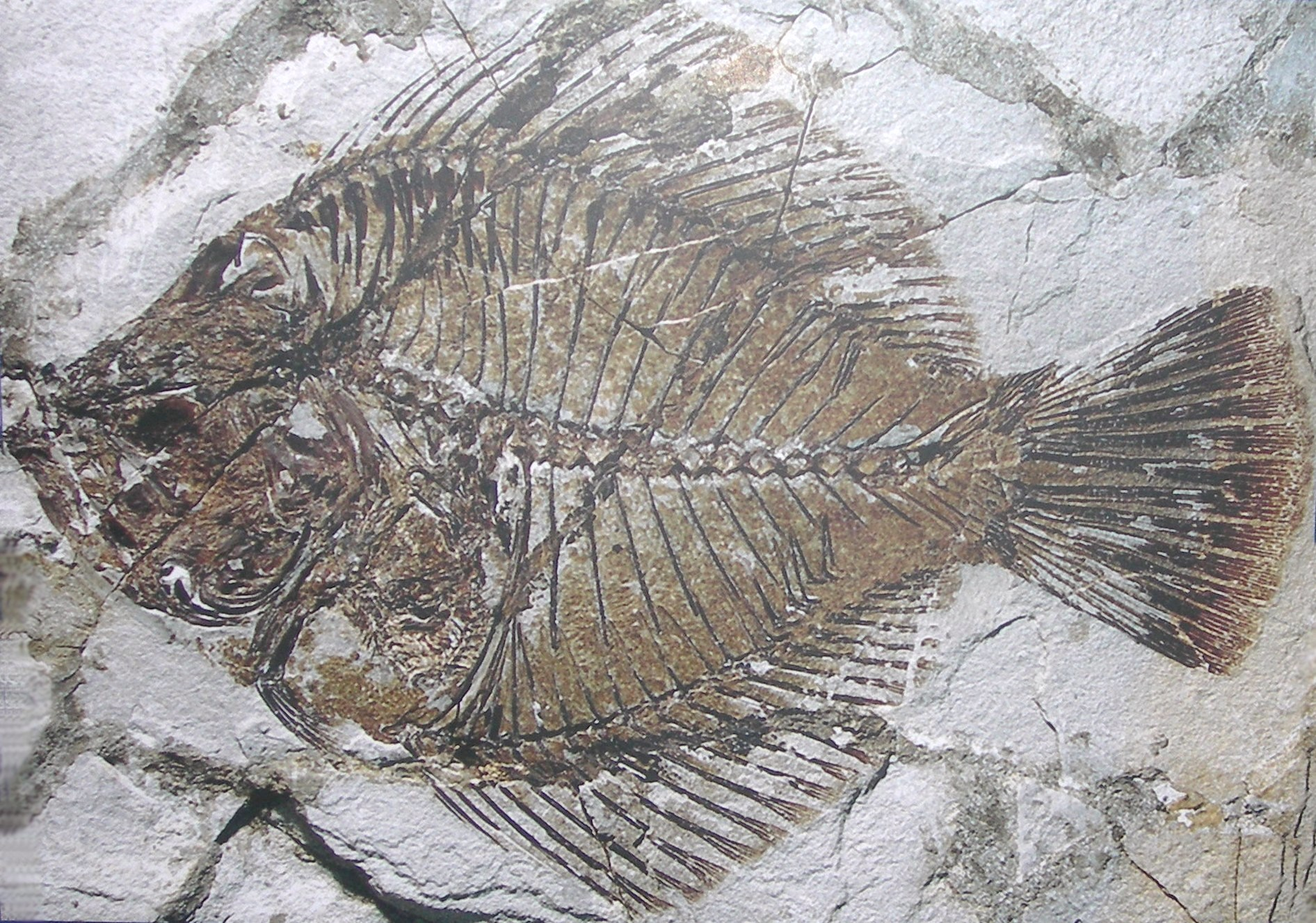
Fossil of the Eocene pleuronectiform †Amphistium paradoxum

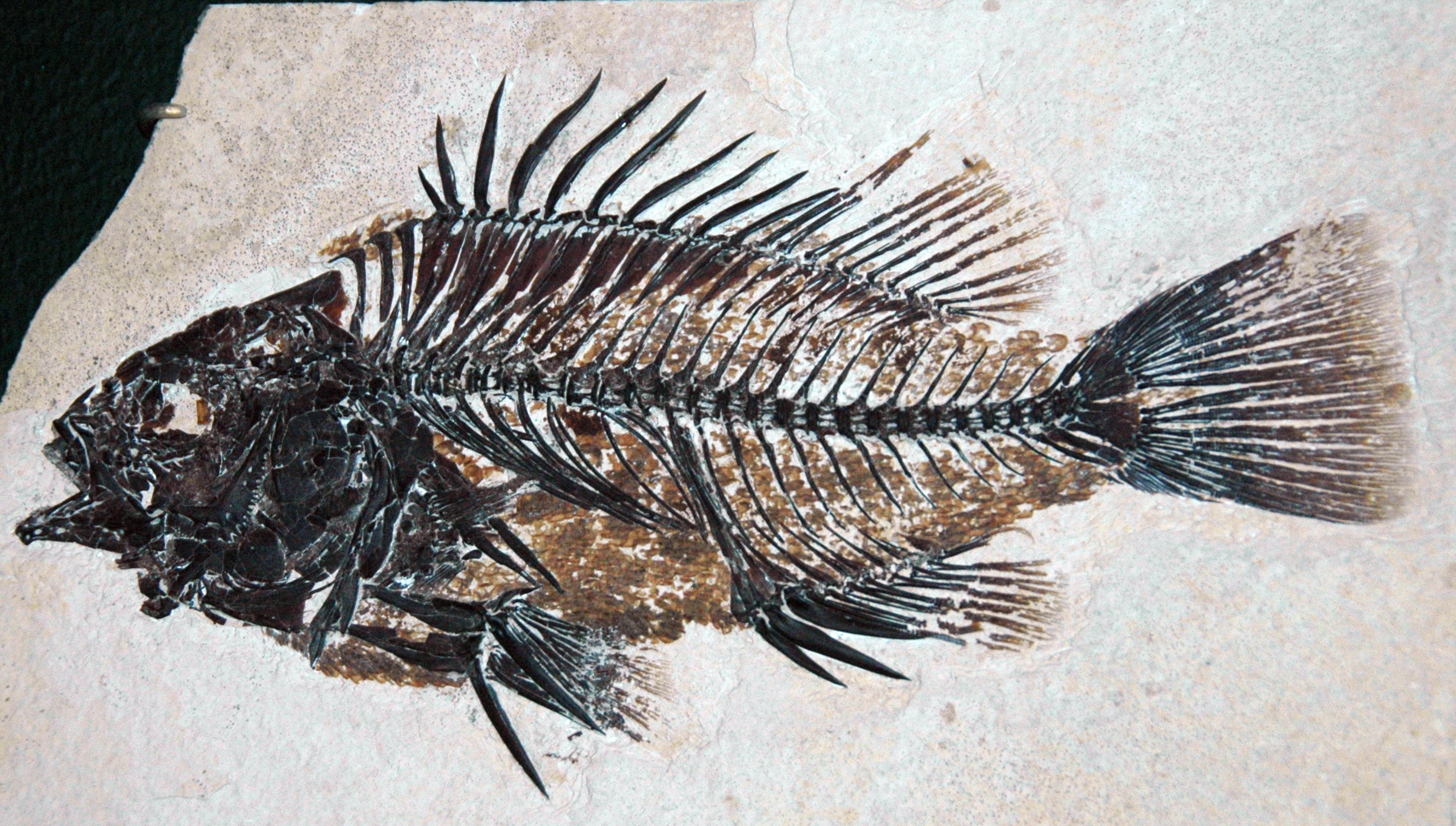
Fossil of a ray-finned perch (†Priscacara serrata) from the Lower Eocene about 50 million years ago

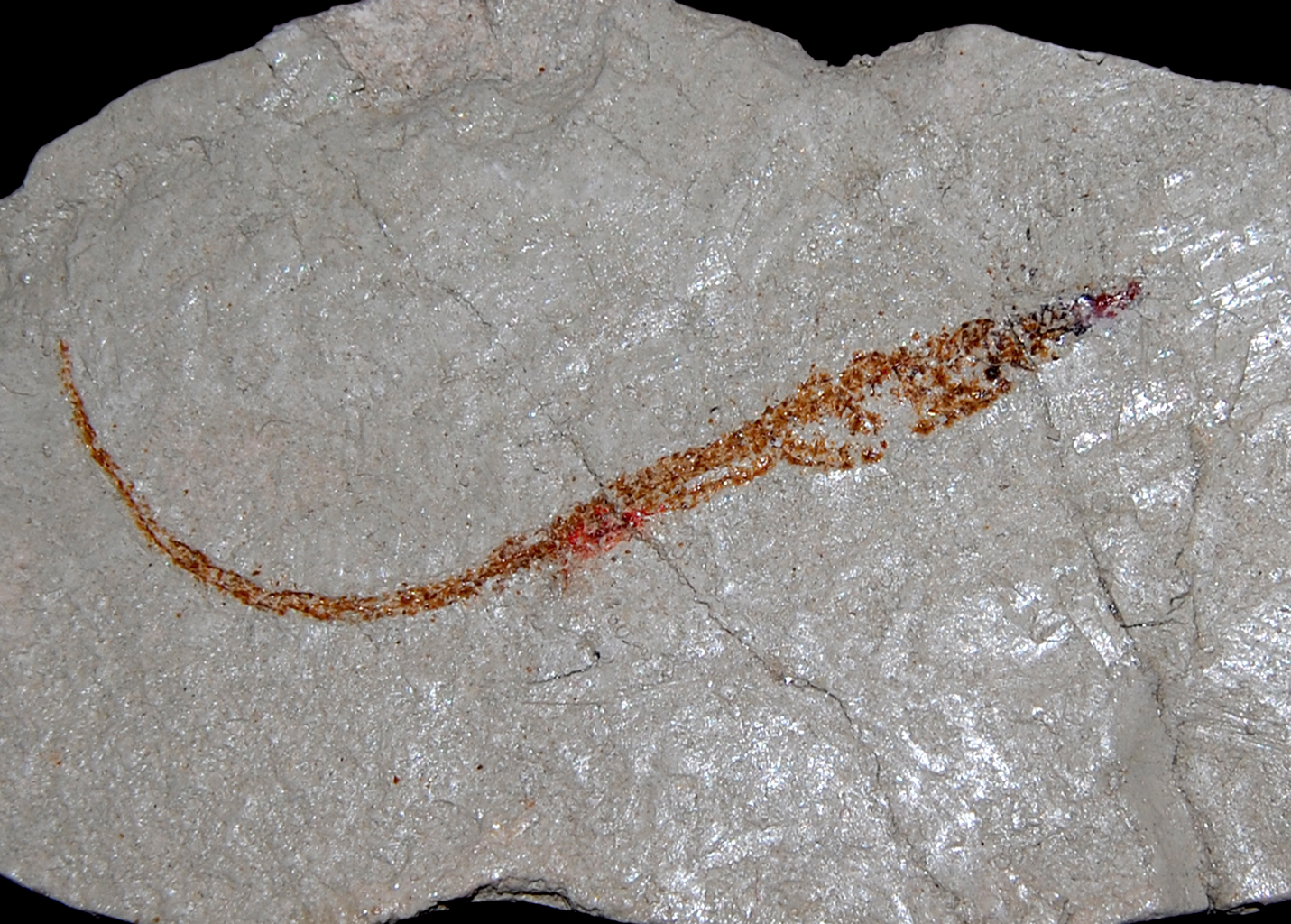
Fossil of the Miocene syngnathiform †Nerophis zapfei

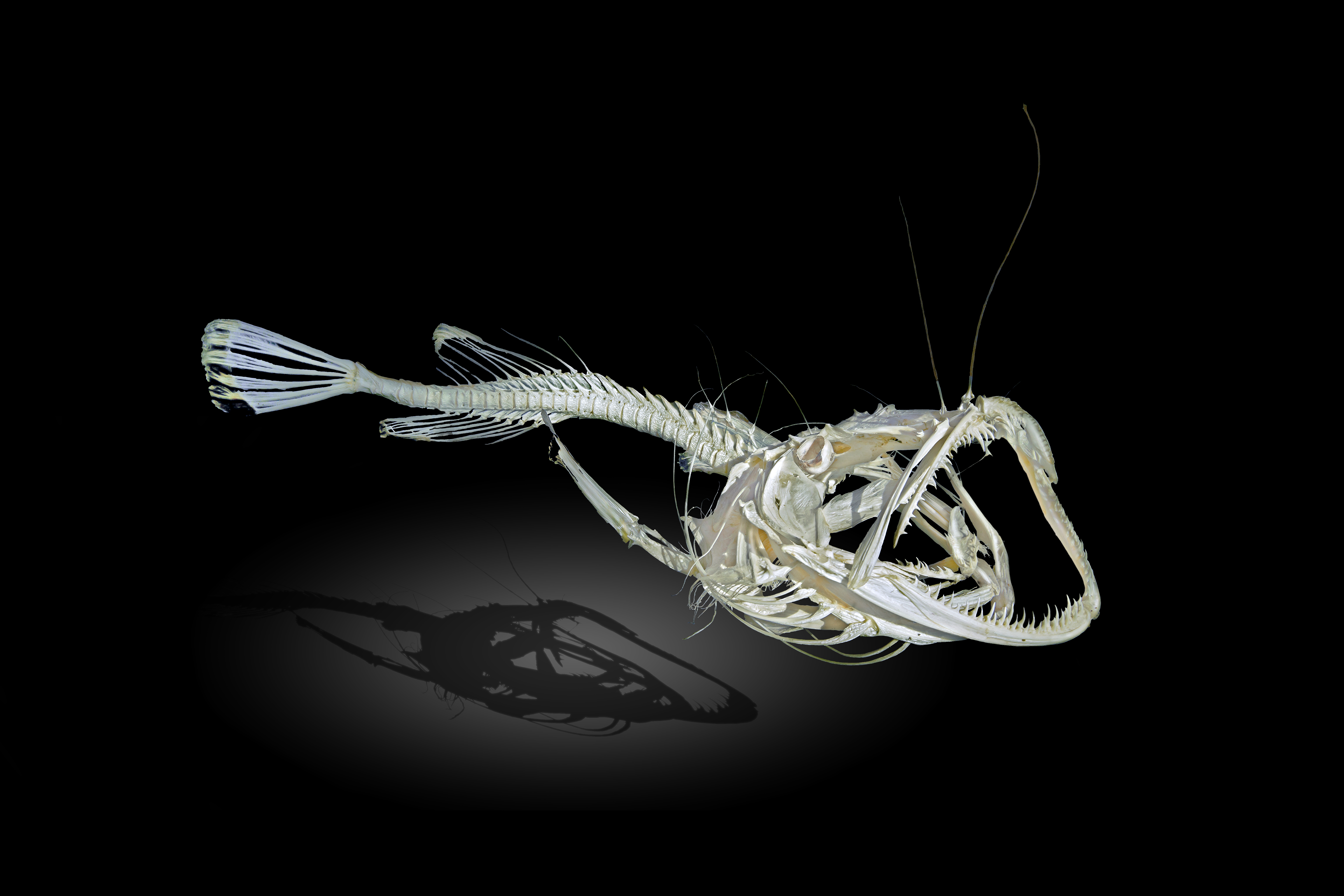
Skeleton of the angler fish, Lophius piscatorius. The first spine of the dorsal fin of the anglerfish is modified so it functions like a fishing rod with a lure

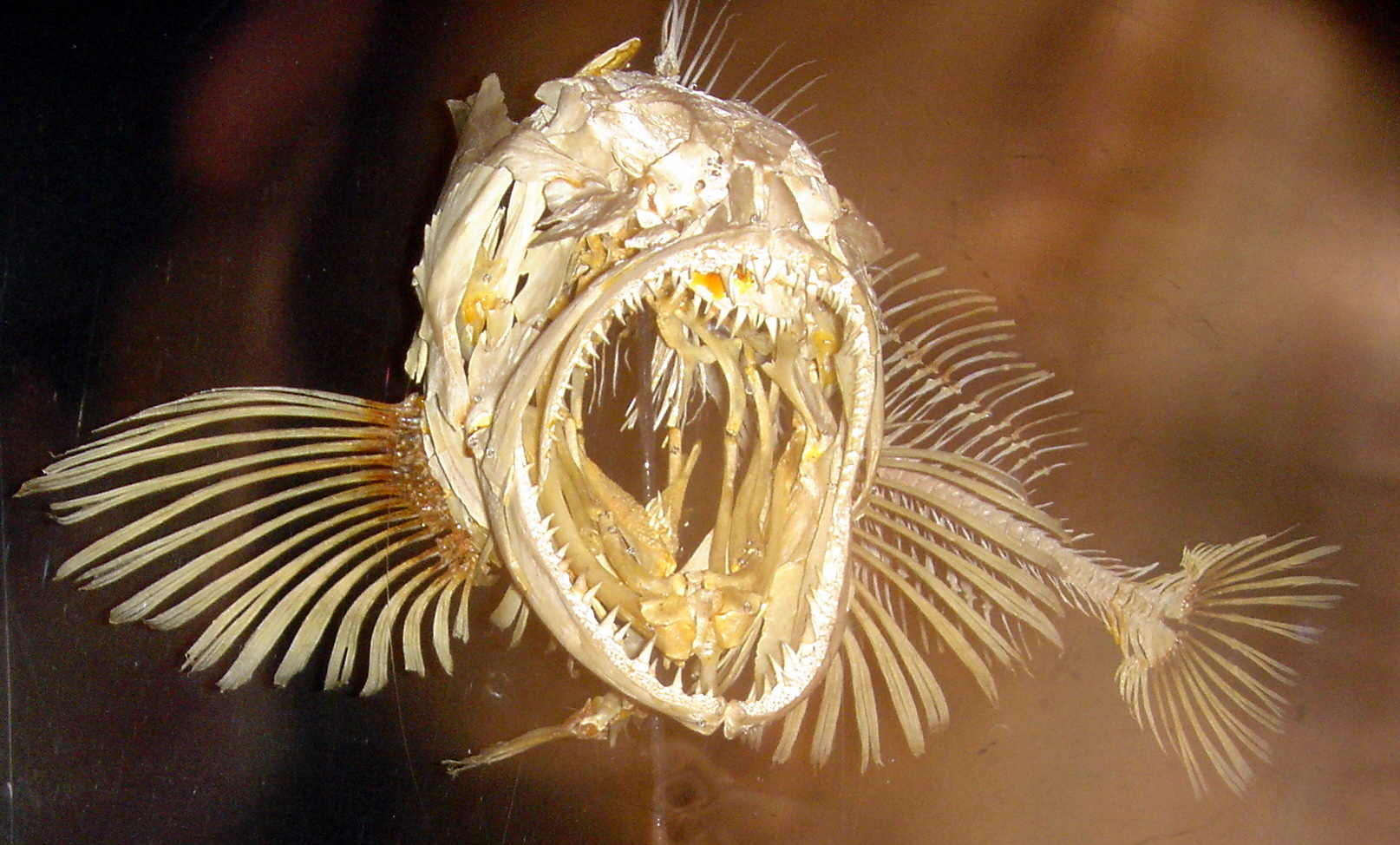
Skeleton of another ray-finned fish, the lingcod

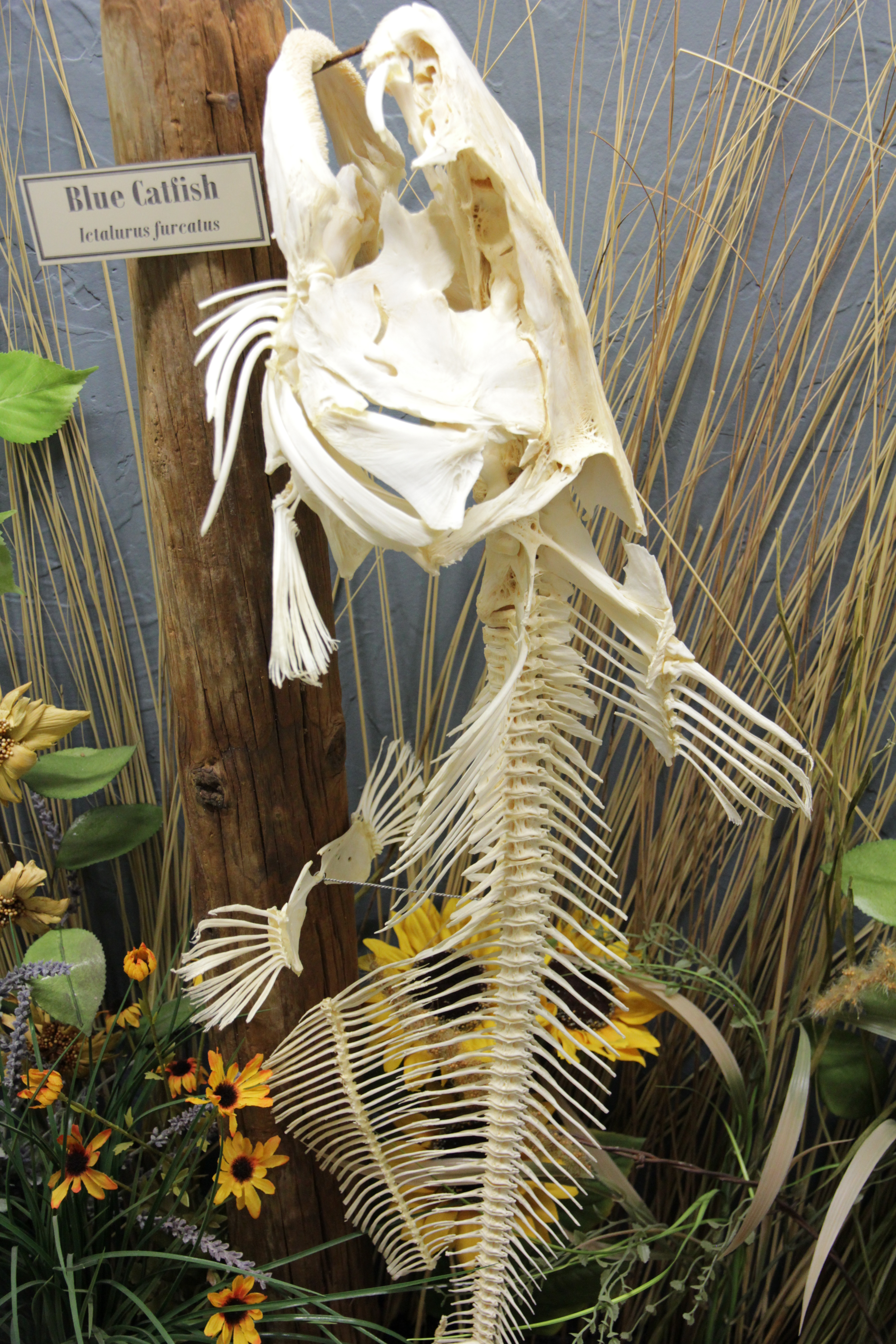
Blue catfish skeleton

=== Taxonomy ===
The listing below is a summary of all extinct (indicated by a dagger, †) and living groups of Actinopterygii with their respective taxonomic rank. The taxonomy follows Eschmeyer's Catalog of Fishes and Betancur-R et al. with notes when this differs from Nelson, ITIS and FishBase and extinct groups from Van der Laan 2016 and Xu 2021.

* Order †?Asarotiformes Schaeffer 1968
- Order †?Discordichthyiformes Minikh 1998
- Order †?Paphosisciformes Grogan & Lund 2015
- Order †Cheirolepidiformes Kazantseva-Selezneva 1977
- Order †Paramblypteriformes Heyler 1969
- Order †Rhadinichthyiformes
- Order †Palaeonisciformes Hay 1902
- Order †Tarrasiiformes sensu Lund & Poplin 2002
- Order †Ptycholepiformes Andrews et al. 1967
- Order †Haplolepidiformes Westoll 1944
- Order †Aeduelliformes Heyler 1969
- Order †Platysomiformes Aldinger 1937
- Order †Dorypteriformes Cope 1871
- Order †Eurynotiformes Sallan & Coates 2013
- Subclass Cladistia Pander 1860
  - Order Polypteriformes Bleeker 1859 (bichirs and reedfishes)
  - Order †?Scanilepiformes Selezneya 1985
- Subclass N/A (stem-Actinopteri)
  - Order †Elonichthyiformes Kazantseva-Selezneva 1977
  - Order †Phanerorhynchiformes
  - Order †Bobasatraniiformes Berg 1940
  - Order †Guildayichthyiformes Lund 2000
  - Order †Saurichthyiformes Aldinger 1937
- Subclass Chondrostei Müller, 1844
  - Order †Birgeriiformes Heyler 1969
  - Order †Chondrosteiformes Aldinger, 1937
  - Order Acipenseriformes Berg 1940 (includes sturgeons and paddlefishes)
- Subclass Neopterygii Regan 1923 sensu Xu & Wu 2012
  - Order †Pholidopleuriformes Berg 1937
  - Order †Redfieldiiformes Berg 1940
  - Order †Platysiagiformes Brough 1939
  - Order †Polzbergiiformes Griffith 1977
  - Order †Perleidiformes Berg 1937
  - Order †Louwoichthyiformes Xu 2021
  - Order †Peltopleuriformes Lehman 1966
  - Order †Colobodontiformes Xu et al 2024
  - Order †Luganoiiformes Lehman 1958
  - Order †Pycnodontomorpha Nursall, 2010
  - Infraclass Holostei Müller 1844
    - Division Halecomorphi Cope 1872 sensu Grande & Bemis 1998
      - Order †Parasemionotiformes Lehman 1966
      - Order †Ionoscopiformes Grande & Bemis 1998
      - Order Amiiformes Huxley 1861 sensu Grande & Bemis 1998 (bowfins)
    - Division Ginglymodi Cope 1871
      - Order †Dapediiformes Thies & Waschkewitz 2015
      - Order †Semionotiformes Arambourg & Bertin 1958
      - Order Lepisosteiformes Hay 1929 (gars)
  - Teleosteomorpha Arratia 2000 sensu Arratia 2013
    - Order †Prohaleciteiformes Arratia 2017
    - Division Aspidorhynchei Nelson, Grand & Wilson 2016
      - Order †Aspidorhynchiformes Bleeker 1859
      - Order †Pachycormiformes Berg 1937
    - Infraclass Teleostei Müller 1844 sensu Arratia 2013
      - Order †?Araripichthyiformes
      - Order †?Ligulelliiformes Taverne 2011
      - Order †?Tselfatiiformes Nelson 1994
      - Order †Pholidophoriformes Berg 1940
      - Order †Dorsetichthyiformes Nelson, Grand & Wilson 2016
      - Order †Leptolepidiformes
      - Order †Crossognathiformes Taverne 1989
      - Order †Ichthyodectiformes Bardeck & Sprinkle 1969
      - Teleocephala de Pinna 1996 s.s.
        - Megacohort Elopocephalai Patterson 1977 sensu Arratia 1999 (Elopomorpha Greenwood et al. 1966)
          - Order Elopiformes Gosline 1960 (ladyfishes and tarpon)
          - Order Albuliformes Greenwood et al. 1966 sensu Forey et al. 1996 (bonefishes)
          - Order Notacanthiformes Goodrich 1909 (halosaurs and spiny eels)
          - Order Anguilliformes Jarocki 1822 sensu Goodrich 1909 (true eels)
        - Megacohort Osteoglossocephalai sensu Arratia 1999
          - Supercohort Osteoglossocephala sensu Arratia 1999 (Osteoglossomorpha Greenwood et al. 1966)
            - Order †Lycopteriformes Chang & Chou 1977
            - Order Hiodontiformes McAllister 1968 sensu Taverne 1979 (mooneye and goldeye)
            - Order Osteoglossiformes Regan 1909 sensu Zhang 2004 (bony-tongued fishes)
          - Supercohort Clupeocephala Patterson & Rosen 1977 sensu Arratia 2010
            - Cohort Otomorpha Wiley & Johnson 2010 (Otocephala; Ostarioclupeomorpha)
              - Subcohort Clupei Wiley & Johnson 2010 (Clupeomorpha Greenwood et al. 1966)
                - Order †Ellimmichthyiformes Grande 1982
                - Order Clupeiformes Bleeker 1859 (herrings and anchovies)
              - Subcohort Alepocephali
                - Order Alepocephaliformes Marshall 1962
              - Subcohort Ostariophysi Sagemehl 1885
                - Section Anotophysa (Rosen & Greenwood 1970) Sagemehl 1885
                  - Order †Sorbininardiformes Taverne 1999
                  - Order Gonorynchiformes Regan 1909 (milkfishes)
                - Section Otophysa Garstang 1931
                  - Order Cypriniformes Bleeker 1859 sensu Goodrich 1909 (barbs, carp, danios, goldfishes, loaches, minnows, rasboras)
                  - Order Characiformes Goodrich 1909 (characins, pencilfishes, hatchetfishes, piranhas, tetras, dourado / golden (genus Salminus) and pacu)
                  - Order Gymnotiformes Berg 1940 (electric eels and knifefishes)
                  - Order Siluriformes Cuvier 1817 sensu Hay 1929 (catfishes)
            - Cohort Euteleosteomorpha (Greenwood et al. 1966) (Euteleostei Greenwood 1967 sensu Johnson & Patterson 1996)
              - Subcohort Lepidogalaxii
                - Order Lepidogalaxiiformes Betancur-Rodriguez et al. 2013 (salamanderfish)
              - Subcohort Protacanthopterygii Greenwood et al. 1966 sensu Johnson & Patterson 1996
                - Order Argentiniformes (barreleyes and slickheads) (formerly in Osmeriformes)
                - Order Galaxiiformes
                - Order Salmoniformes Bleeker 1859 sensu Nelson 1994 (salmon, trout and pike)
              - Subcohort Stomiati
                - Order Osmeriformes (smelts)
                - Order Stomiiformes Regan 1909 (bristlemouths and marine hatchetfishes)
              - Subcohort Neoteleostei Nelson 1969
                - Infracohort Ateleopodia
                  - Order Ateleopodiformes (jellynose fish)
                - Infracohort Eurypterygia Rosen 1973
                  - Section Aulopa [Cyclosquamata Rosen 1973]
                    - Order Aulopiformes Rosen 1973 (Bombay duck and lancetfishes)
                  - Section Ctenosquamata Rosen 1973
                    - Subsection Myctophata [Scopelomorpha]
                      - Order Myctophiformes Regan 1911 (lanternfishes)
                    - Subsection Acanthomorpha Betancur-Rodriguez et al. 2013
                      - Division Lampridacea Betancur-Rodriguez et al. 2013 [Lampridomorpha; Lampripterygii]
                        - Order Lampriformes Regan 1909 (oarfish, opah and ribbonfishes)
                      - Division Paracanthomorphacea sensu Grande et al. 2013 (Paracanthopterygii Greenwood 1937)
                        - Order Percopsiformes Berg 1937 (cavefishes and trout-perches)
                        - Order †Sphenocephaliformes Rosen & Patterson 1969
                        - Order Zeiformes Regan 1909 (dories)
                        - Order Gadiformes Goodrich 1909 (cods)
                      - Division Polymixiacea Betancur-Rodriguez et al. 2013 (Polymyxiomorpha; Polymixiipterygii)
                        - Order †Pattersonichthyiformes Gaudant 1976
                        - Order †Ctenothrissiformes Berg 1937
                        - Order Polymixiiformes Lowe 1838 (beardfishes)
                      - Division Euacanthomorphacea Betancur-Rodriguez et al. 2013 (Euacanthomorpha sensu Johnson & Patterson 1993; Acanthopterygii Gouan 1770 sensu])
                        - Order Trachichthyiformes (fangtooths and pineconefishes)
                        - Subdivision Berycimorphaceae Betancur-Rodriguez et al. 2013
                          - Order Beryciformes (alfonsinos and holocentrids) (incl. Holocentriformes, Stephanoberyciformes; Cetomimiformes)
                        - Subdivision Percomorphaceae Betancur-Rodriguez et al. 2013 (Percomorpha sensu Miya et al. 2003; Acanthopteri)
                          - Series Ophidiimopharia Betancur-Rodriguez et al. 2013
                            - Order Ophidiiformes (pearlfishes)
                          - Series Batrachoidimopharia Betancur-Rodriguez et al. 2013
                            - Order Batrachoidiformes (toadfishes)
                          - Series Gobiomopharia Betancur-Rodriguez et al. 2013
                            - Order Gobiiformes (cardinalfishes, sleepers and gobies)
                          - Series Syngnathomorpharia Betancur-Rodriguez et al. 2013
                            - Order Syngnathiformes (seahorses, pipefishes, sea moths, cornetfishes and flying gurnards)
                            - Order Scombriformes (Tunas and (mackerels)
                          - Series Carangimopharia Betancur-Rodriguez et al. 2013
                            - Subseries Anabantaria Betancur-Rodriguez et al. 2014
                              - Order Synbranchiformes (swamp eels)
                              - Order Anabantiformes (Labyrinthici) (gouramies, snakeheads, )
                            - Subseries Carangaria Betancur-Rodriguez et al. 2014
                              - Order Carangiformes (Jack mackerels, pompanos, flatfishes, billfishes)
                            - Subseries Ovalentaria Smith & Near 2012 (Stiassnyiformes sensu Li et al. 2009)
                              - Order Atheriniformes Rosen 1964 (silversides and rainbowfishes)
                              - Order Cyprinodontiformes Berg 1940 (livebearers, killifishes)
                              - Order Beloniformes Berg 1940 (flyingfishes and ricefishes)
                              - Order Cichliformes Betancur-Rodriguez et al. 2013 (Cichlids, Convict blenny, leaf fishes)
                              - Order Mugiliformes Berg 1940 (mullets)
                              - Order Blenniiformes Springer 1993 (Blennies, damselfish, Clingfishes)
                          - Series Eupercaria Betancur-Rodriguez et al. 2014 (Percomorpharia Betancur-Rodriguez et al. 2013)
                            - Order Perciformes Bleeker 1859
                            - Order Centrarchiformes Bleeker 1859 (Sunfishes and mandarin fishes)
                            - Order Labriformes (Wrasses and Parrotfishes)
                            - Order Acropomatiformes
                            - Order Acanthuriformes
                            - Order Lophiiformes Garman 1899 (Anglerfishes)
                            - Order Tetraodontiformes Regan 1929 (Filefishes and pufferfish)
