= Asarotus =

Asarotus Temporal range: Campanian

Scientific classification
- Kingdom: Animalia
- Phylum: Chordata
- Class: Actinopterygii
- Order: †Asarotiformes; Schaeffer, 1968
- Family: †Asarotidae; Schaeffer, 1968
- Genus: †Asarotus; Schaeffer, 1968
- Species: †A. arcanus

Binomial name
- †Asarotus arcanus Schaeffer, 1968

Extinct genus of fishes

Asarotus is an extinct genus of prehistoric marine ray-finned fish from the Niobrara Formation of Nebraska, during the Campanian. The type species, A. arcanus is only known from poorly preserved single specimen, which makes hard to classify existing orders of Cretaceous actinopterygians. It is thus classified as the only member of its family Asarotidae and order Asarotiformes. Some authorities consider it a late-surviving member of the "palaeonisciform" fishes.
