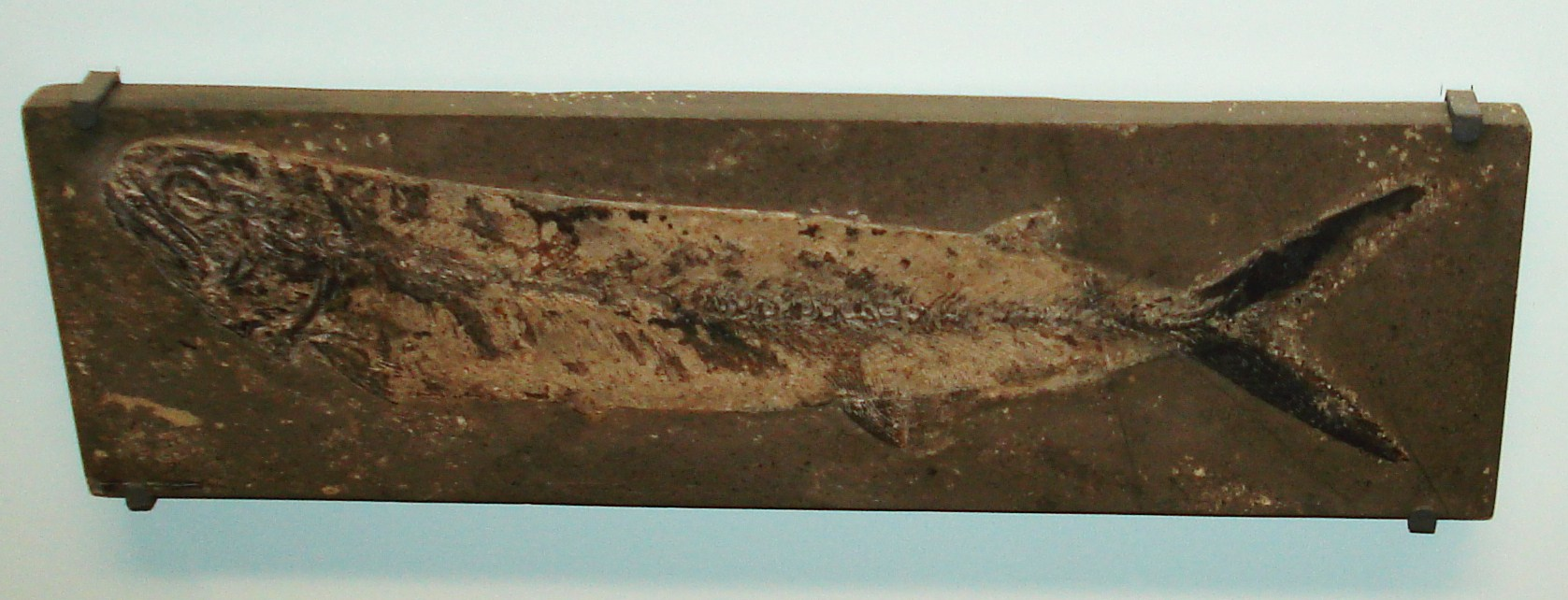
- E. incognitus specimen, State Museum of Natural History Stuttgart

Scientific classification
- Kingdom: Animalia
- Phylum: Chordata
- Class: Actinopterygii
- Order: †Pachycormiformes
- Family: †Protosphyraenidae
- Genus: †Euthynotus; Agassiz, 1843
- Species: †E. incognitus

Binomial name
- †Euthynotus incognitus (de Blainville, 1818)

Synonyms
- †Esox incognitus de Blainville, 1818

= Euthynotus =

Euthynotus Temporal range: Early Toarcian

Extinct genus of fishes

Euthynotus is an extinct genus of prehistoric marine ray-finned fish that lived in Europe during the Early Jurassic epoch. It is generally considered the basalmost pachycormiform, although more recent studies instead place it as the most basal member of the predatory lineage within the pachycormiforms, the Protosphyraenidae.

It contains only a single definitive species, E. incognitus (de Blainville, 1818) (=Esox incognitus de Blainville, 1818), known from well-preserved specimens from the Toarcian-aged Posidonia Shale of Germany.

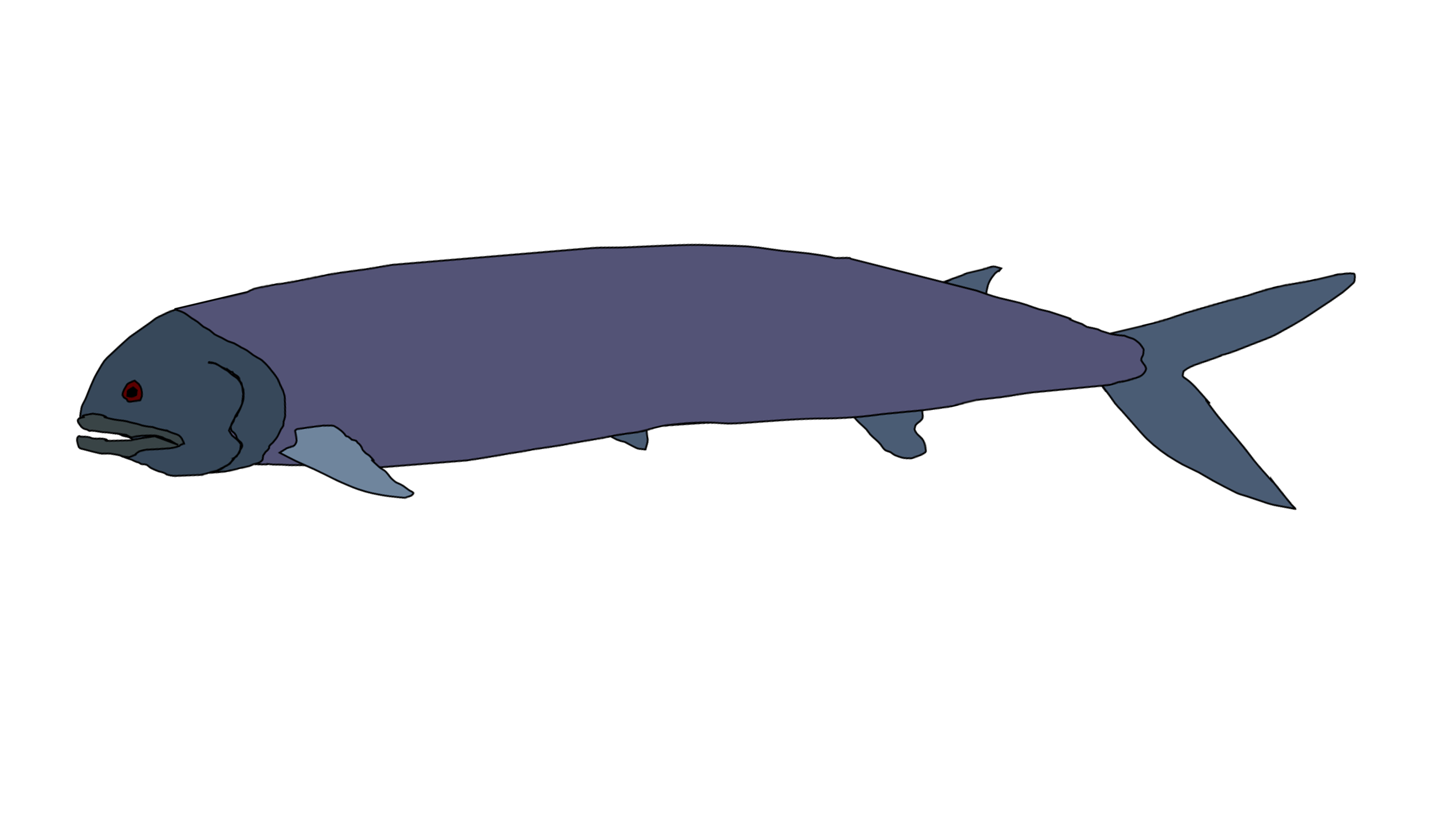
Life restoration

Three other species also placed in this genus by Woodward (1901), include E. intermedius Agassiz, 1844, E. speciosus Wagner, 1860 and E. milloti (Sauvage, 1891). However, Mainwaring (1978) found these species to all be fragmentary and most likely misattributed to this genus, with E. intermedius being lost and most likely a specimen of Pachycormus, E. milloti to be a member of Sauropsis, and E. speciosus to also be lost and also most likely a specimen of Sauropsis. Another species placed here by Mainwaring (1978), E. retrodorsalis (itself formerly in Asthenocormus), is now placed in its own genus, Pseudoasthenocormus.

== See also ==
- Prehistoric fish
- List of prehistoric bony fish
