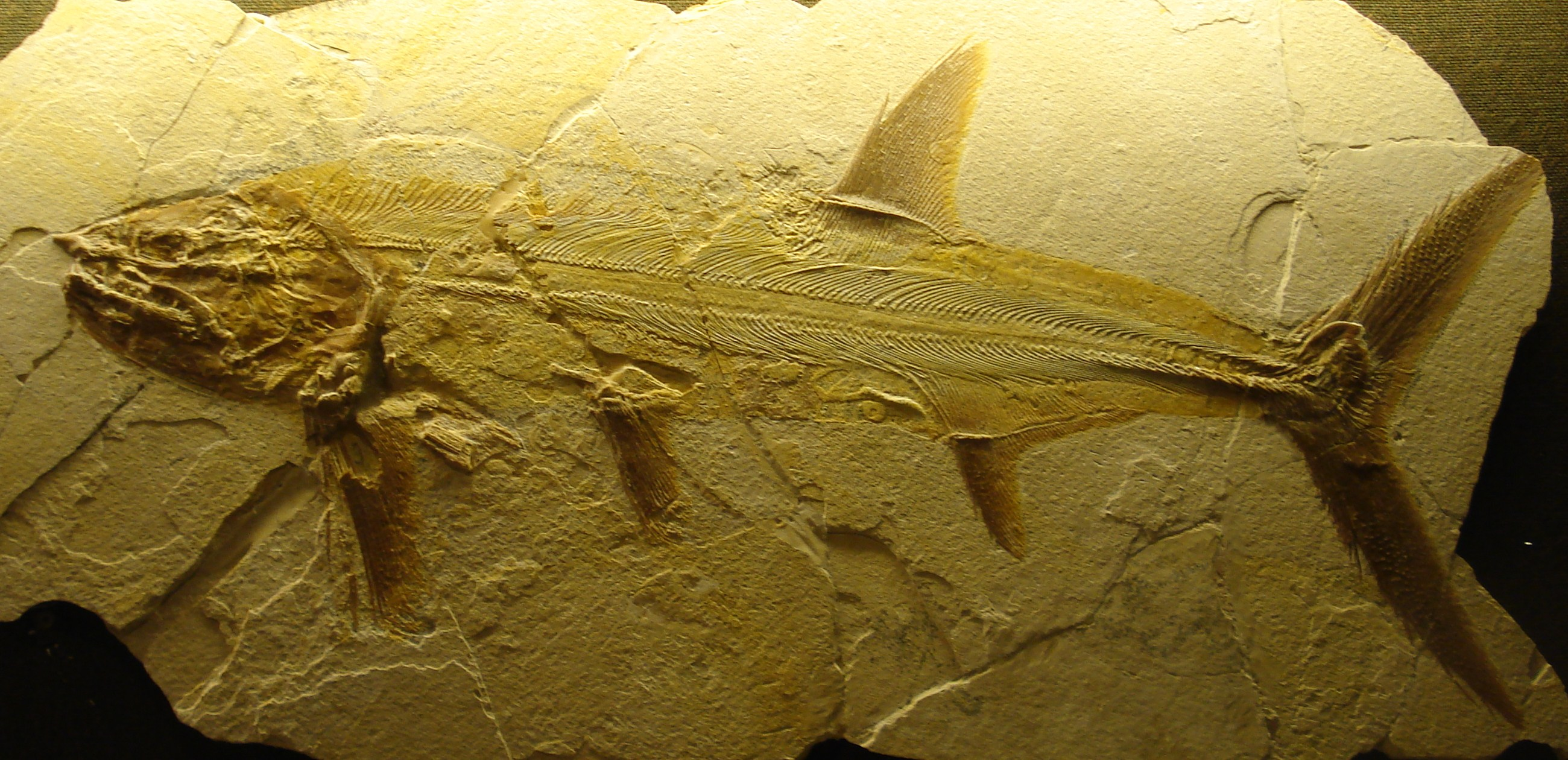
- Fossil of Orthocormus roeperi
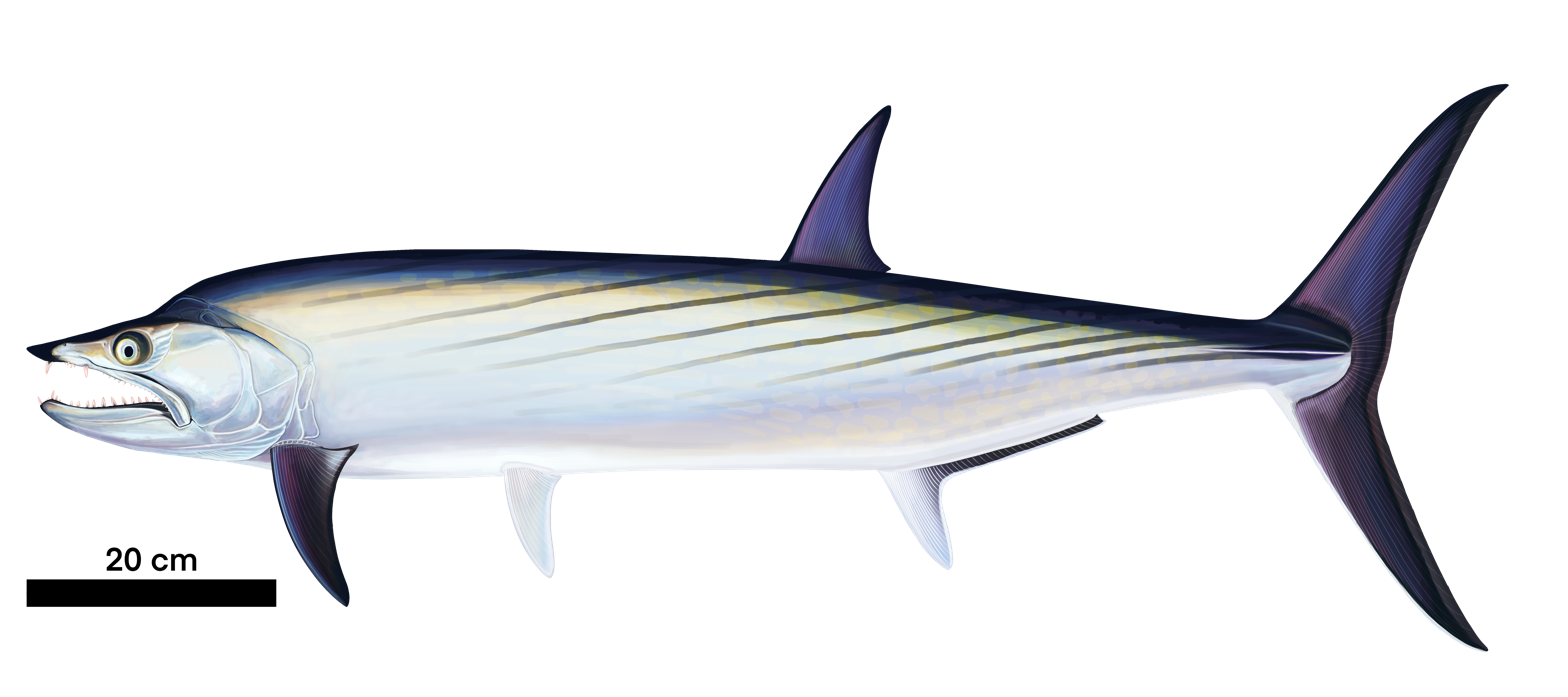
- Restoration of Orthocormus cornutus

Scientific classification
- Kingdom: Animalia
- Phylum: Chordata
- Class: Actinopterygii
- Order: †Pachycormiformes
- Family: †Protosphyraenidae
- Genus: †Orthocormus; Weitzel,1930

Type species
- Orthocormus cornutus Weitzel,1930

Species
- Orthocormus cornutus Weitzel, 1930; Orthocormus gushchinae Kanarkina, Zverkov & Varenov, 2026; Orthocormus roeperi Arratia & Schultze, 2013; Orthocormus teyleri Lambers, 1988

= Orthocormus =

Orthocormus Temporal range: Kimmeridgian

Extinct genus of fishes

Orthocormus is an extinct genus of prehistoric pachycormiform bony fish. It is known from three species found in Late Jurassic (Kimmeridgian) aged plattenkalk deposits in Bavaria, Germany. The species "Hypsocormus" tenuirostris Woodward 1889 from the late Middle Jurassic (Callovian) Oxford Clay is not closely related to the type species of Hypsocormus, and is more closely related to Orthocormus + Protosphyraena, and thus has sometimes been referred to in open nomenclature as Orthocormus? tenuirostris. The species of Orthocormus reached over a metre in length, and are thought to have been pelagic predators.

== See also ==
- Prehistoric fish
- List of prehistoric bony fish
