= Martillichthys =

Martillichthys Temporal range: Callovian

Scientific classification
- Domain: Eukaryota
- Kingdom: Animalia
- Phylum: Chordata
- Class: Actinopterygii
- Order: †Pachycormiformes
- Family: †Pachycormidae
- Genus: †Martillichthys; Liston 2008

Type species
- Martillichthys renwickae Liston 2008

Extinct genus of fishes

Martillichthys is an extinct genus of pachycormiform fish, known from the late Middle Jurassic (Callovian) Oxford Clay, England. It is a member of the suspension feeding clade within the Pachycormiformes, most closely related to Asthenocormus.
