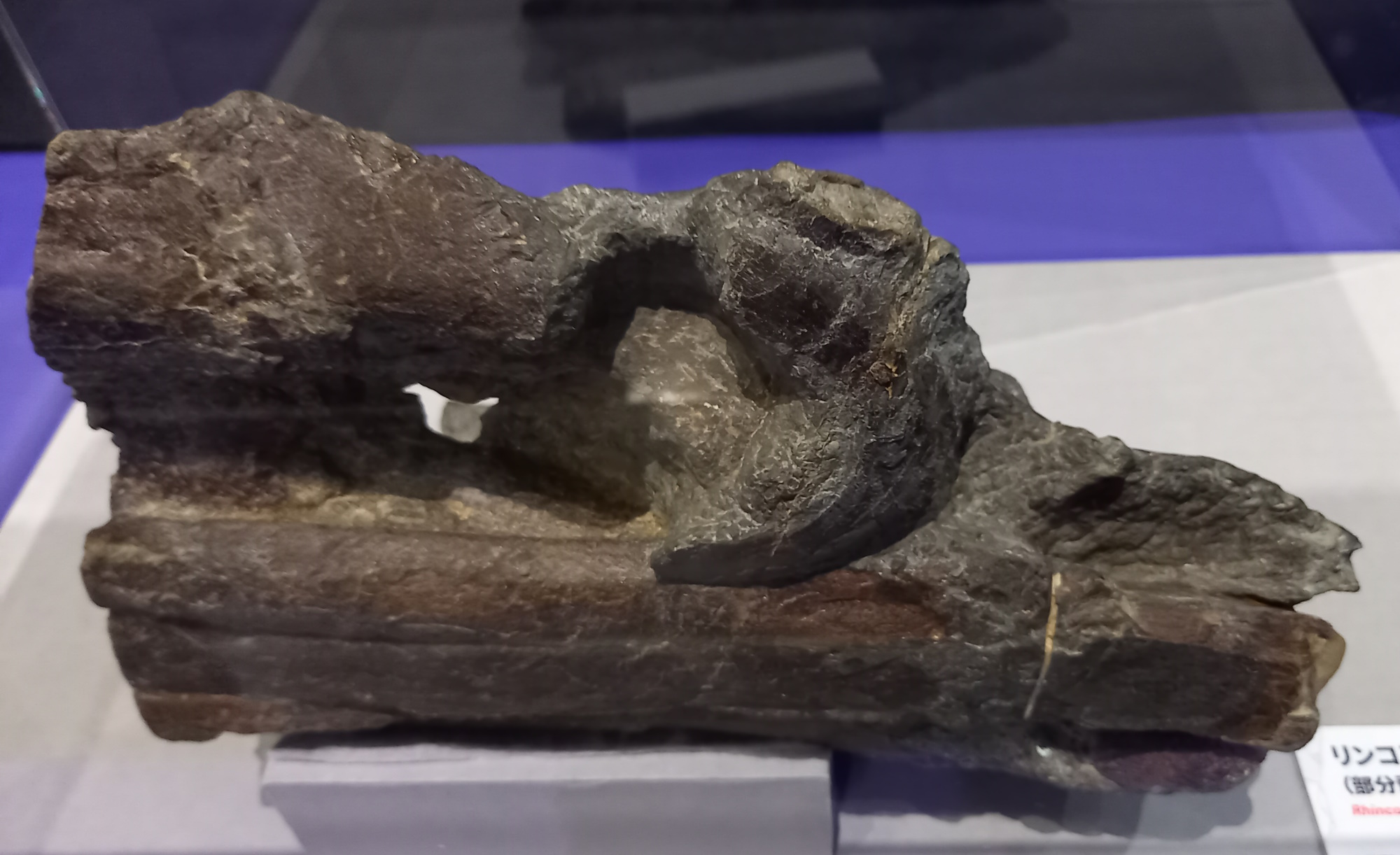
- Type specimen of R. uyenoi, displayed at the Nagoya City Science Museum

Scientific classification
- Kingdom: Animalia
- Phylum: Chordata
- Class: Actinopterygii
- Order: †Pachycormiformes
- Family: †Pachycormidae
- Subfamily: †Asthenocorminae
- Genus: †Rhinconichthys; Friedman et al., 2010

Species
- †R. taylori Friedman et al., 2010; †R. purgatoirensis Schumacher et al., 2016; †R. uyenoi Schumacher et al., 2016

= Rhinconichthys =

Rhinconichthys Temporal range: Cenomanian

Extinct genus of fishes

Rhinconichthys is an extinct genus of bony fish which existed during the Cenomanian stage of the Late Cretaceous.

Along with its close cousins the great-white-shark-sized or larger Bonnerichthys and the immense Leedsichthys, Rhinconichthys forms a line of giant filter-feeding bony pachycormid fish that swam the Jurassic and Cretaceous seas for over 100 million years.

== Etymology ==
The generic name was chosen as a homophone of an unpublished name (“Rhynchonichthys”) coined by Gideon Mantell, and is meant to evoke the generic name of the whale shark, Rhincodon.

== Description ==
Rhinconichthys was a medium-sized fish. R. uyenoi grew to around 3.4–4.5 metres (11–15 ft) long, while R. purgatoirensis was much smaller, around 2–2.7 metres (6.6–8.9 ft) long.
