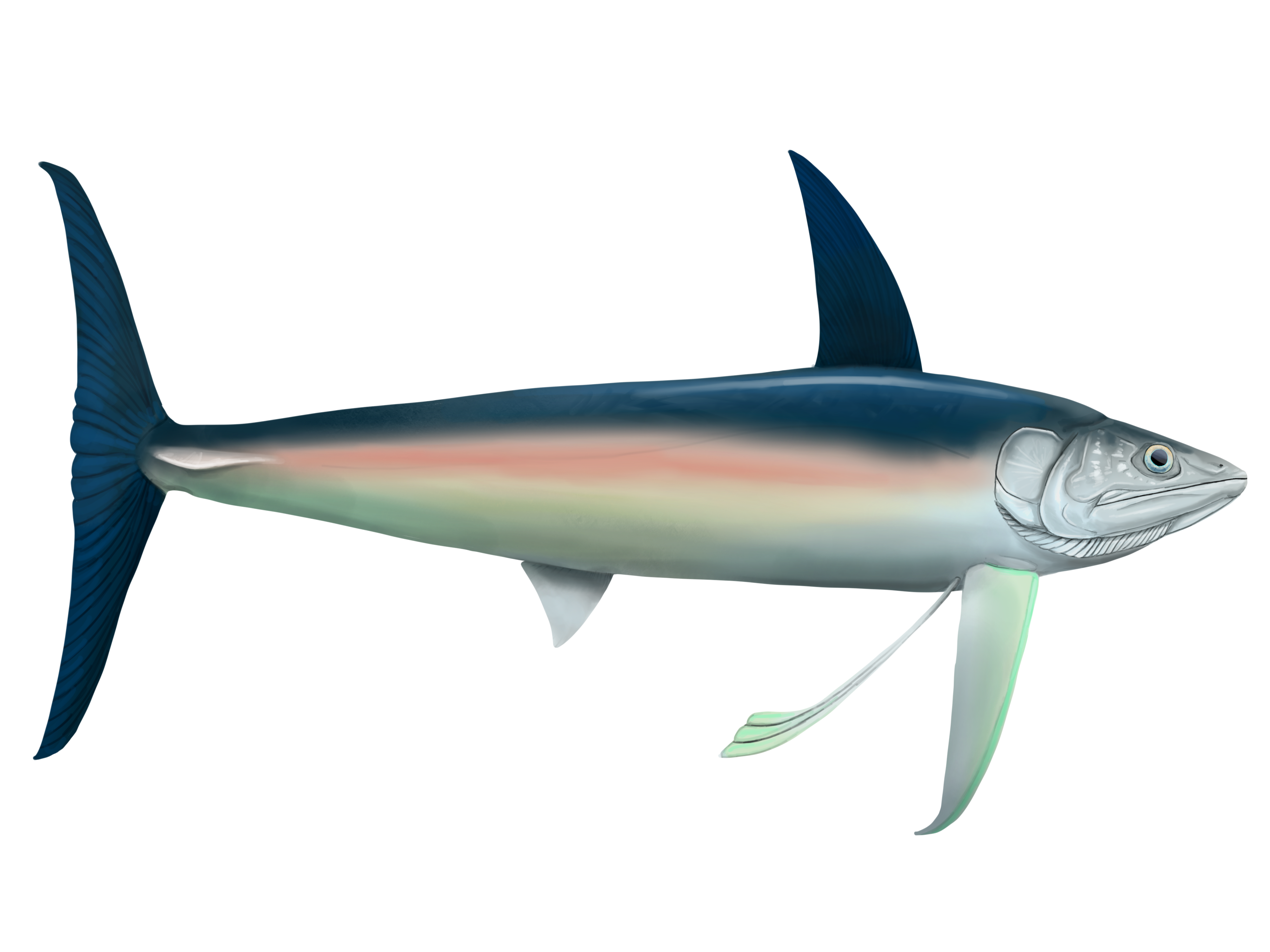
- Restoration

Scientific classification
- Kingdom: Animalia
- Phylum: Chordata
- Class: Actinopterygii
- Order: †Pachycormiformes
- Family: †Pachycormidae
- Subfamily: †Asthenocorminae
- Genus: †Bonnerichthys; Friedman et al., 2010
- Species: †B. gladius

Binomial name
- †Bonnerichthys gladius (Cope, 1873)

Synonyms
- Portheus gladius Cope, 1873; Protosphyraena gladius (Cope, 1873)

= Bonnerichthys =

Bonnerichthys Temporal range: Late Cretaceous, 89–66 Ma

Extinct genus of fishes

Bonnerichthys is a genus of fossil fishes within the family Pachycormidae that lived during the Coniacian to Maastrichtian stage of the Late Cretaceous. Fossil remains of this taxon were first described from the Smoky Hill Member of the Niobrara Chalk Formation of Kansas (Late Coniacian-Early Campanian), and additional material was later reported from the Pierre Shale, Mooreville Chalk, Demopolis Chalk, Wenonah Formation, and Moreno Formation, among other localities. It has also been reported in European Russia, specifically from the Rybushka Formation of the Saratov Region. It grew to at least 5 metres (16 ft) in total body length, substantially less than the related Leedsichthys from the Jurassic which likely grew up to 16.5 metres (54 ft).

== Feeding ==
One of the most significant features of Bonnerichthys is the recognition that it was a filter feeder, living on plankton. This recognition that many large-bodied fish from the Mesozoic in the Pachycormidae were filter feeders shows that this niche was filled for at least 100 million years before previously known. The modern niche is filled by several species of sharks and the baleen whales.

The international team that described the genus named it after the Marion Charles Bonner fossil hunting family, whose collections from the Niobrara Cretaceous chalk of western Kansas are in many museums and research institutions.
