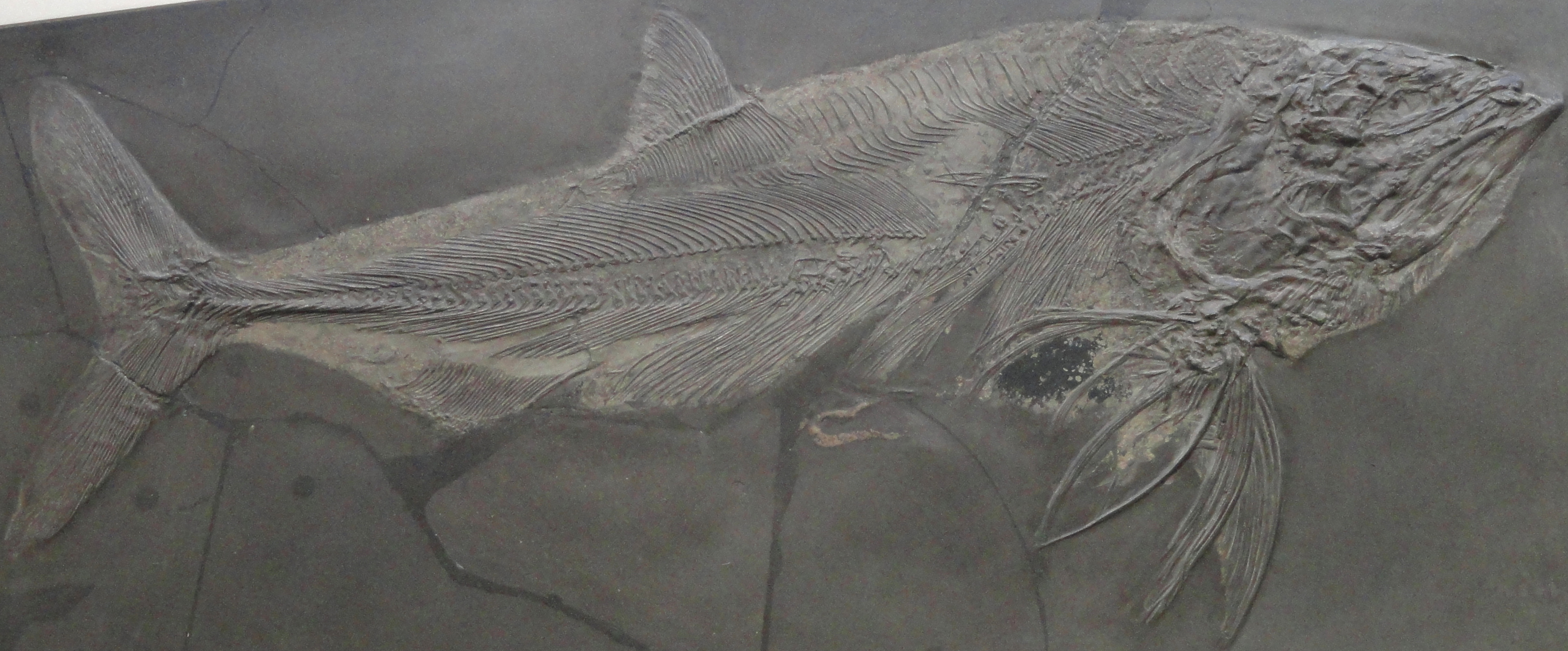
- Fossil of Pachycormus
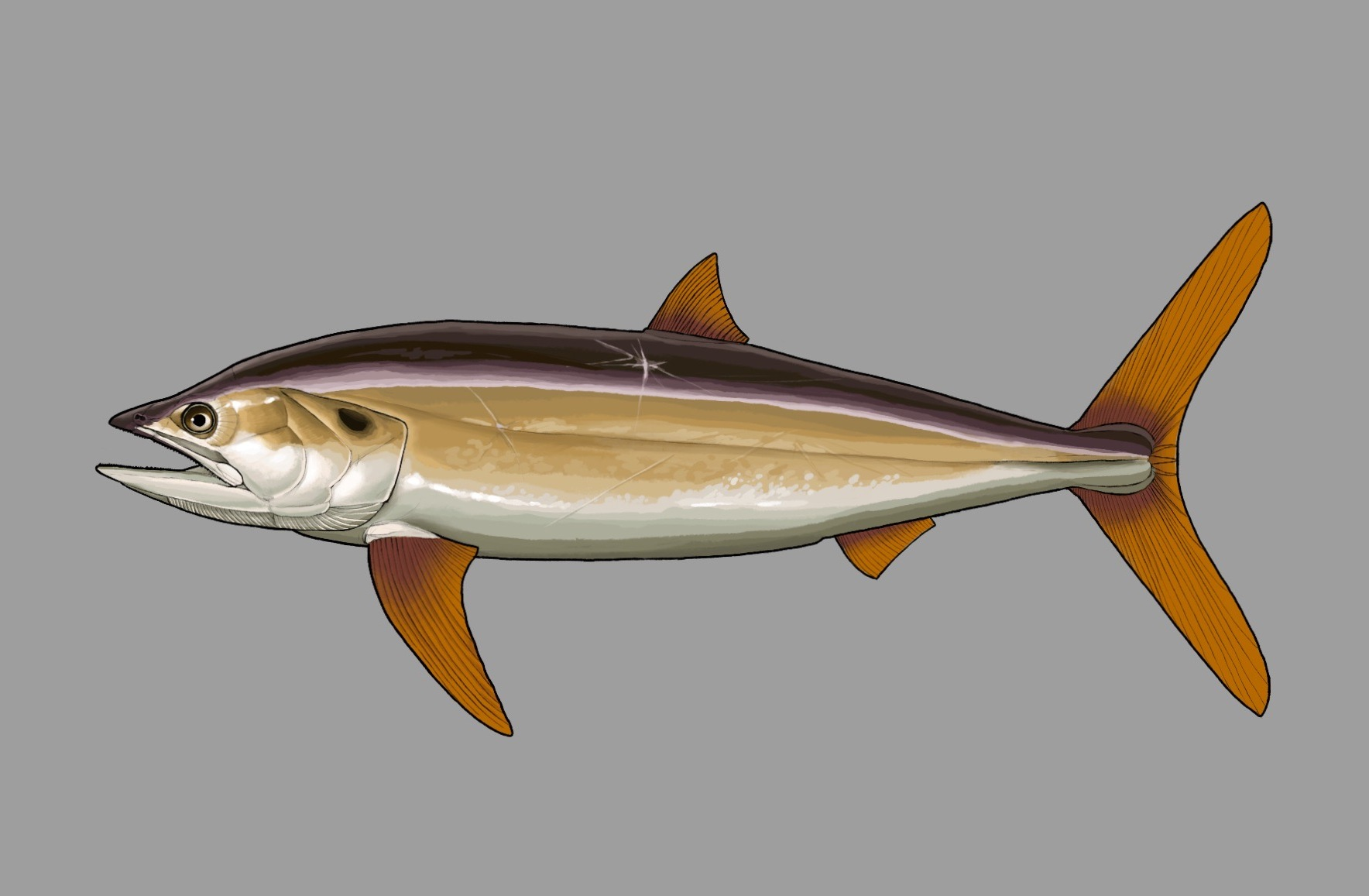
- Artist's impression of Pachycormus

Scientific classification
- Kingdom: Animalia
- Phylum: Chordata
- Class: Actinopterygii
- Order: †Pachycormiformes
- Family: †Pachycormidae
- Subfamily: †Pachycorminae
- Genus: †Pachycormus; Agassiz, 1833

Type species
- †Pachycormus macropterus (originally Elops macropterus) (de Blainville 1818)

= Pachycormus (fish) =

Pachycormus Temporal range: Toarcian

Extinct genus of fishes

Pachycormus (from Greek: παχύς pakhús, 'thick' and Greek: κορμός kormós 'trunk') is an extinct genus of pachycormiform ray-finned fish known from the Early Jurassic (Toarcian stage) of Europe.

== Taxonomy ==
The type species P. macropterus was first named as a species of Elops by Henri Marie Ducrotay de Blainville in 1818, it was placed into the newly named genus Pachycormus by Louis Agassiz in 1833. Fossils have been found in marine deposits from France, Germany and England. Pachycormus has recently been considered monotypic, only containing P. macropterus, with other species considered junior synonyms of the former, though this has subsequently been questioned. Pachycormus has generally been considered basal among Pachycormiformes, with a recent phylogeny finding it to be the second most basal pachycormiform after Euthynotus.

== Description ==
It grew up to 1 m (3.5 ft) in length. The teeth are short and designed for grasping. Its ecology has been interpreted as that of a generalist predator. Stomach contents indicate that its diet included cephalopods (including vampyropods, belemnites and ammonites), and small fish, including juvenile Pachycormus. One particular specimen shows that it died because of swallowing an ammonite too large for its size, and the ammonite itself was only shortly digested just before the fish's death.

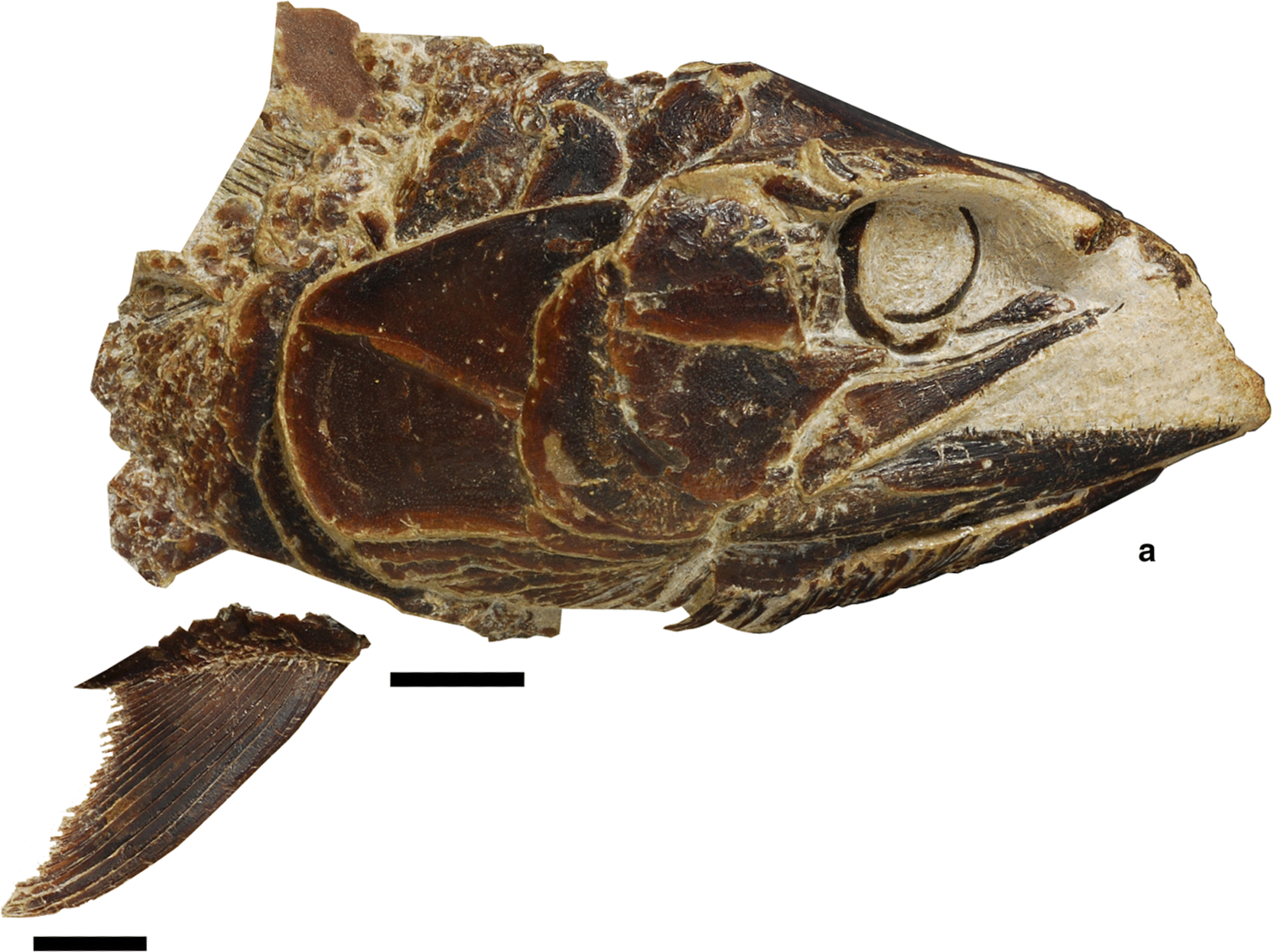
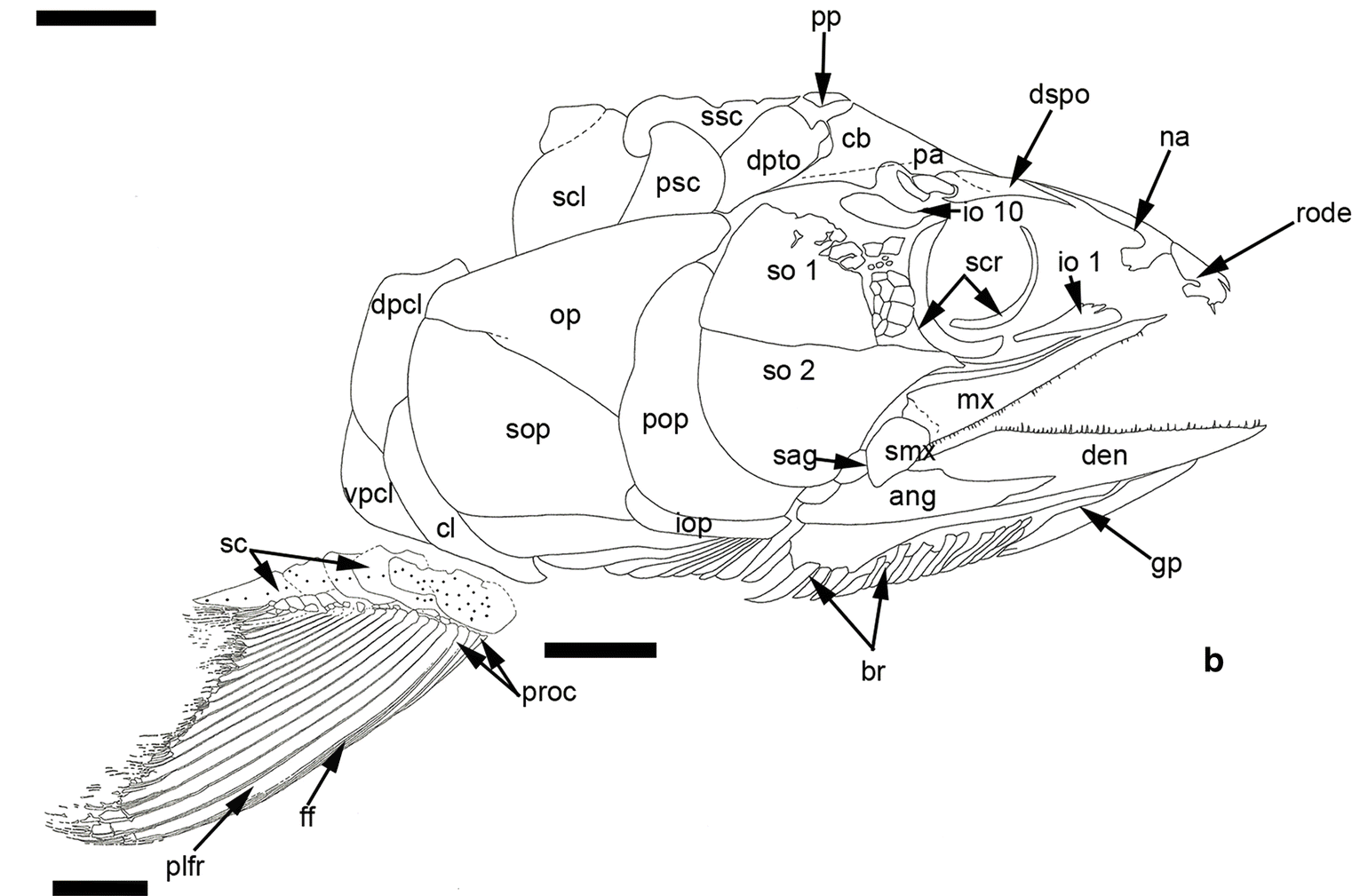
3-dimensionally preserved head and forefin of Pachycormus from the Strawberry Bank Lagerstatte, part of the Beacon Limestone Formation in Somerset, UK. Scale bar equals 1 cm.
