= Eugnathides =

Eugnathides Temporal range: Oxfordian

Scientific classification
- Domain: Eukaryota
- Kingdom: Animalia
- Phylum: Chordata
- Class: Actinopterygii
- Order: †Pachycormiformes
- Genus: †Eugnathides; Gregory, 1923
- Species: †E. browni

Binomial name
- †Eugnathides browni Gregory, 1923

Extinct genus of fishes

Eugnathides is an extinct genus of prehistoric marine ray-finned fish that lived during the Late Jurassic epoch. It contains a single species, E. browni from the Oxfordian-aged Jagua Formation of Cuba.

It is thought to most likely be a pachycormiform, although it is in need of taxonomic revision.

== See also ==
- Prehistoric fish
- List of prehistoric bony fish
