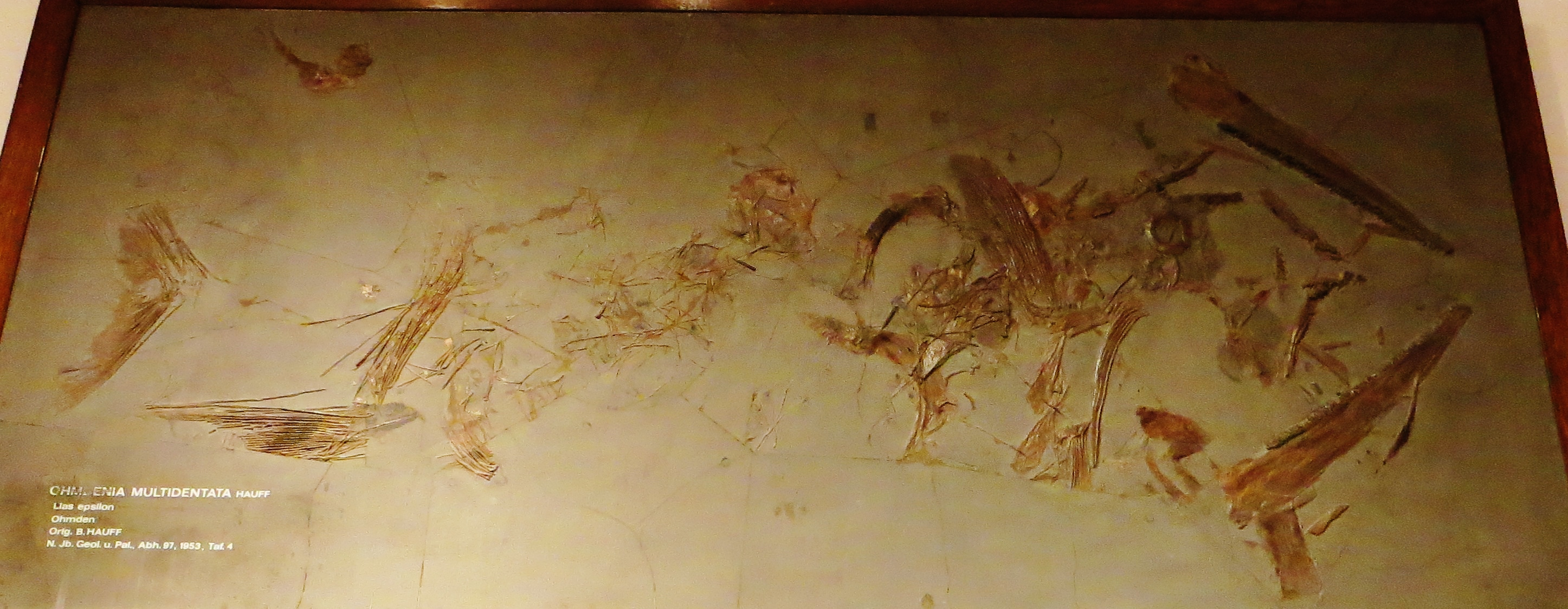
- Ohmdenia multidentata fossil

Scientific classification
- Kingdom: Animalia
- Phylum: Chordata
- Class: Actinopterygii
- Order: †Pachycormiformes
- Family: †Pachycormidae
- Subfamily: †Asthenocorminae
- Genus: †Ohmdenia; Hauff, 1953
- Species: †O. multidentata

Binomial name
- †Ohmdenia multidentata Hauff, 1953

= Ohmdenia =

Ohmdenia Temporal range: Early Toarcian ~183–182 Ma

Extinct genus of fishes

Ohmdenia is an extinct genus of prehistoric bony fish that lived from the Toarcian stage of the Early Jurassic period. Ohmdenia was first described in 1953 by Bernhard Hauff, based on a fossil found in the well-known Posidonia Shale in Holzmaden, Germany. For a long time this animal has been considered a close relative of Birgeria, a great predator typical of the Triassic period with an uncertain systematic position. Further studies have shown similarities with the Pachycormiformes, a group considered close to the origin of teleosts and also including giant forms and planktivores (e.g., Leedsichthys). Some studies have erroneously indicated Ohmdenia as a synonym of Saurostomus, other studies have instead placed Ohmdenia as an important evolutionary link between the basal pachycormiforms and the more derived planktivore pachycormiformes.

== Description ==
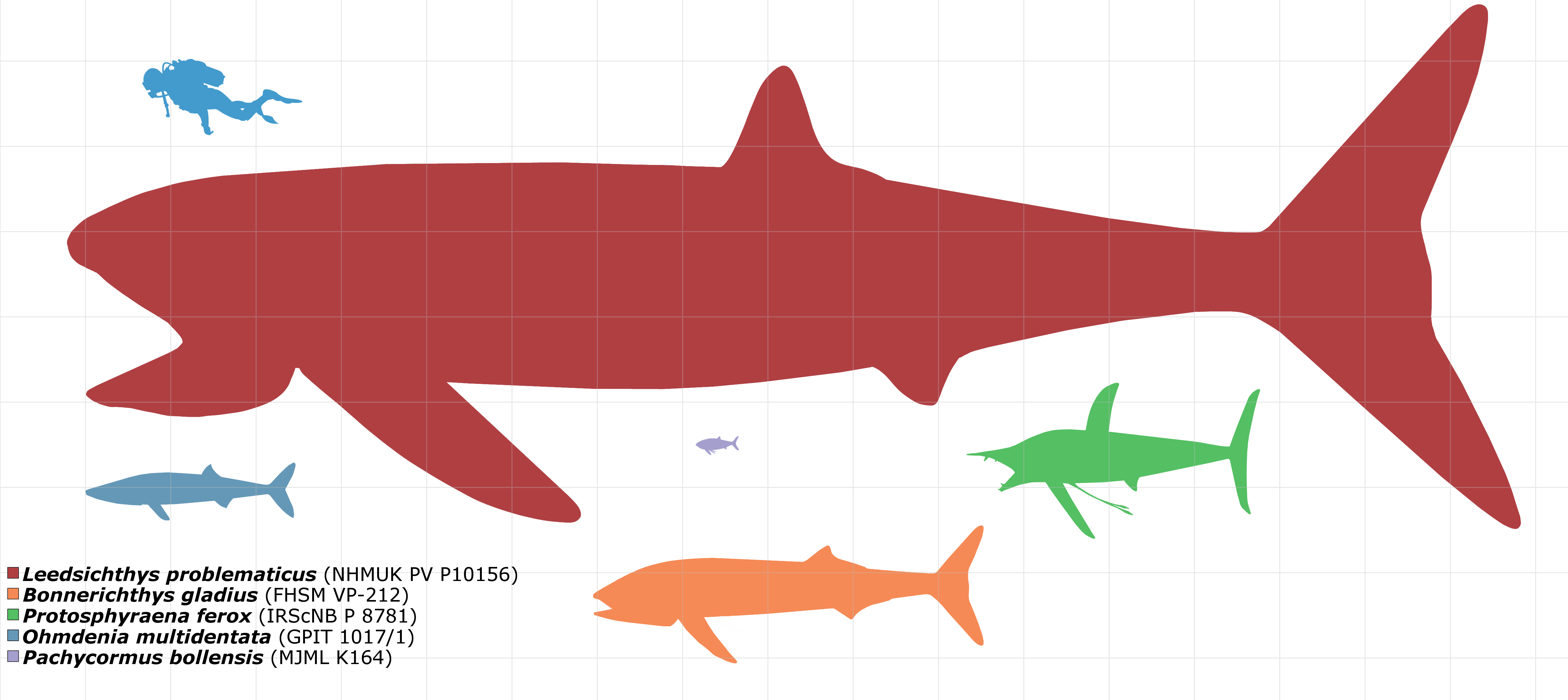
Size comparison with relatives (blue)

This animal is known exclusively from an incomplete fossil, but sufficient to reconstruct (at least partially) its appearance. Ohmdenia must have been a large fish, at least two and a half meters long. Ohmdenia was therefore one of the largest bony fishes of the lower Jurassic, surpassed only by giant chondrostei such as Strongylosteus and Gyrosteus. The body had to be relatively slender, with a symmetrical and slender tail. The skull was long and short, and had a jaw equipped with numerous teethsmall, rather robust, rear-facing and placed in an area that extended along the dorsal margin of the jaw. The combination of a long and slender body and a low and elongated skull is unique among the fish related to Ohmdenia (the pachicormiforms).

== Paleobiology ==
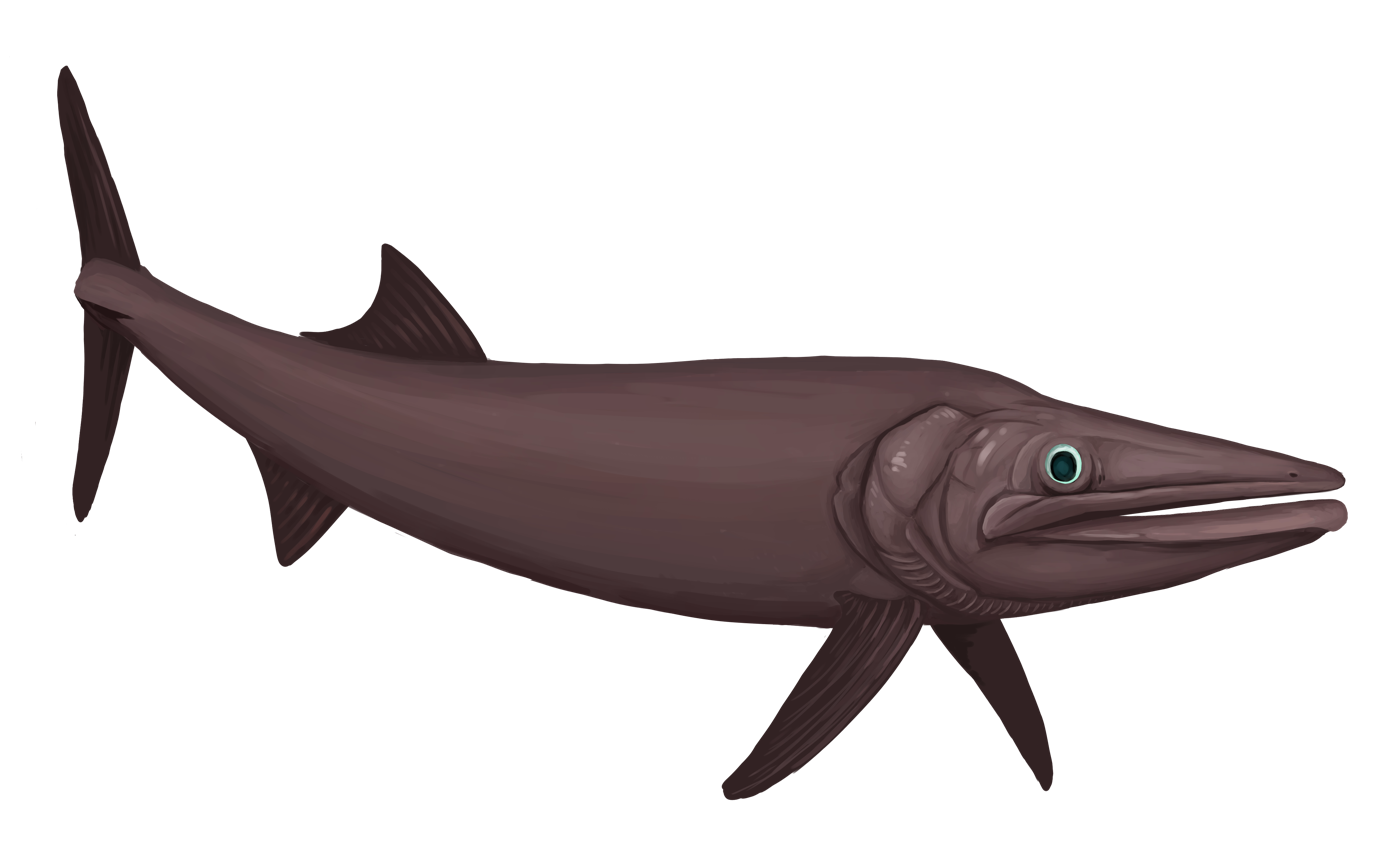
Reconstruction

The long mouth of Ohmdenia, together with the peculiar teeth, imply a particular diet for this animal. Usually, the pachicormiforms possess thin, needle-like teeth, or large fanged fangs, or are still totally devoid of teeth. Ohmdenia, on the other hand, possessed numerous small backward-facing teeth; this type of dentition is commonly associated with predators that feed on Cephalopods from the soft body. Even the jaws would seem to be less robust than those of the other pachicormiforms. The presence of two fossils of belemnites in the area of the belly of Ohmdenia corroborates the theory that this animal is seen as a predator of molluscs; cephalopods with a soft body.

== See also ==
- Prehistoric fish
- List of prehistoric bony fish
