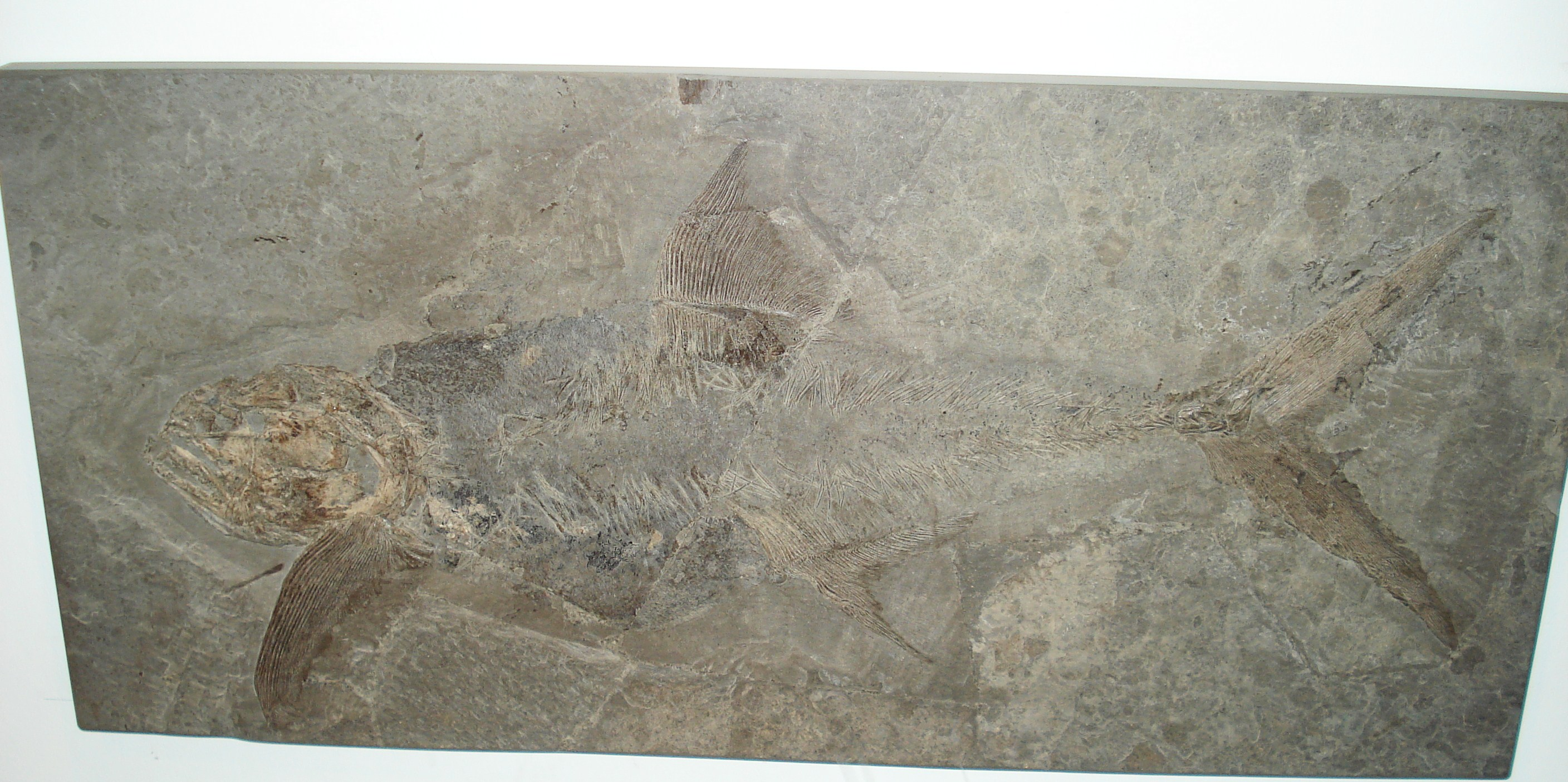
- Fossil Saurostomus

Scientific classification
- Kingdom: Animalia
- Phylum: Chordata
- Class: Actinopterygii
- Order: †Pachycormiformes
- Genus: †Saurostomus; Agassiz, 1833
- Species: †S. esocinus

Binomial name
- †Saurostomus esocinus Agassiz, 1833

= Saurostomus =

Saurostomus Temporal range: Early Toarcian

Extinct genus of fishes

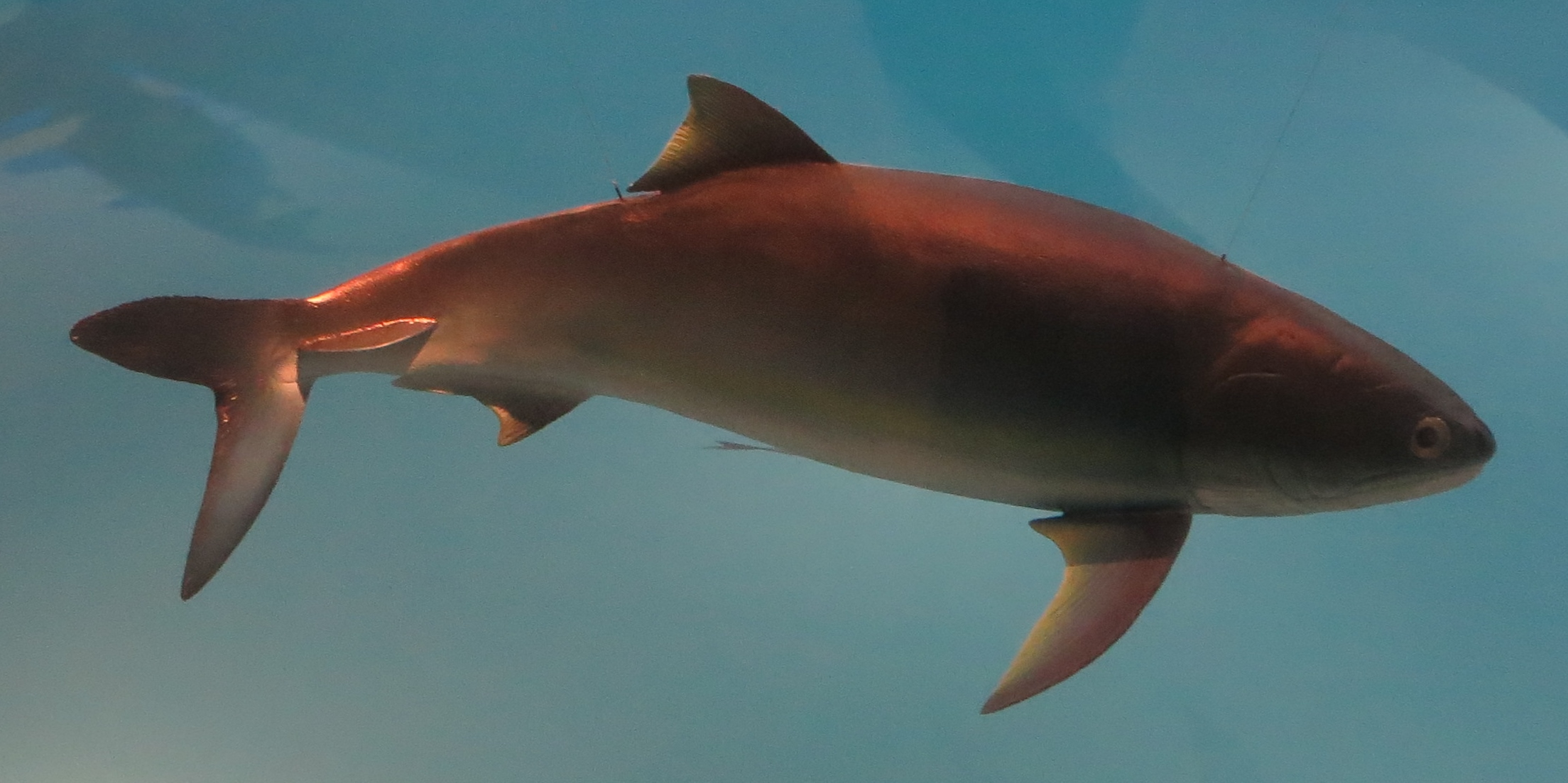
Model

Saurostomus is an extinct genus of prehistoric bony fish that lived during the early Toarcian stage of the Early Jurassic epoch.

== Palaeoecology ==
Fossils of Saurostomus esocinus containing coleoid gladii in their oesophagus have shown that the species fed on coleoids belonging to the species Teudopsis bollensis and on indeterminate loligosepiines.

== See also ==
- Prehistoric fish
