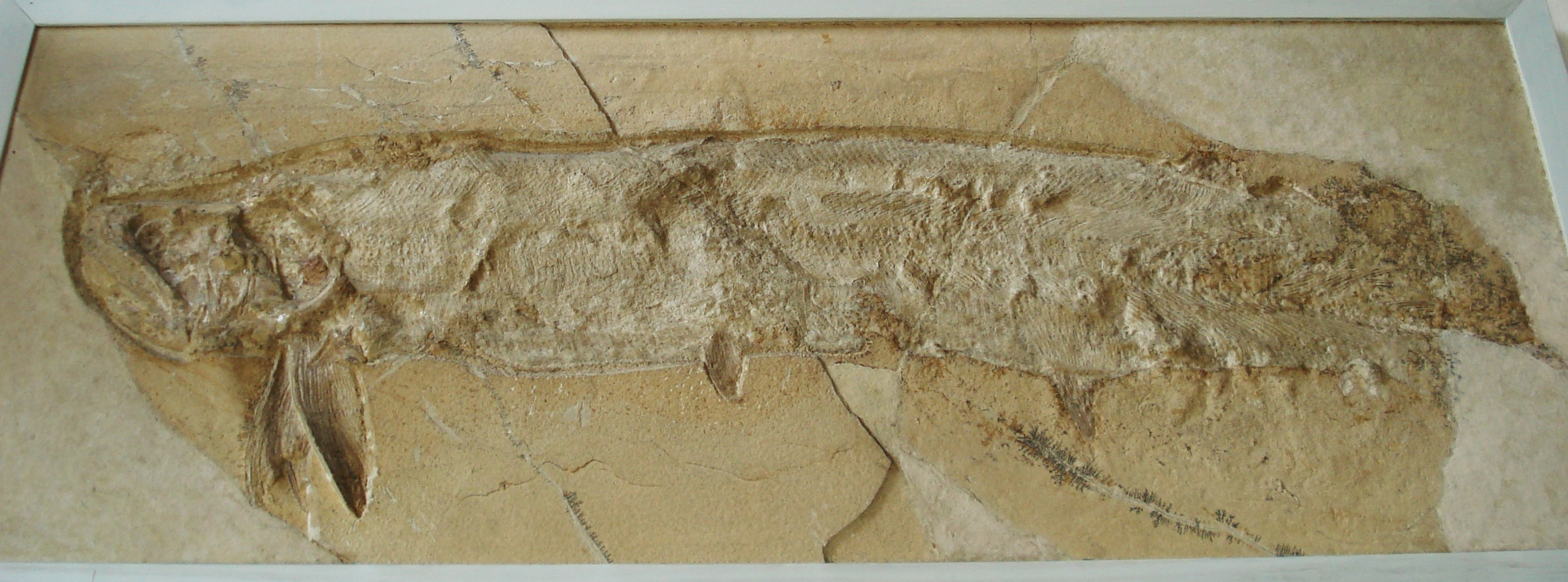
- Fossil of Pseudoasthenocormus retrodorsalis

Scientific classification
- Kingdom: Animalia
- Phylum: Chordata
- Class: Actinopterygii
- Order: †Pachycormiformes
- Family: †Protosphyraenidae
- Genus: †Pseudoasthenocormus
- Species: †P. retrodorsalis

Binomial name
- †Pseudoasthenocormus retrodorsalis (Eastman, 1914)

= Pseudoasthenocormus =

Pseudoasthenocormus Temporal range: Kimmeridgian-Tithonian ~152–148 Ma

Extinct genus of ray-finned fishes

Pseudoasthenocormus is an extinct genus of ray-finned fish belonging to the family Pachycormidae. It contains one species, P. retrodorsalis. It lived during the upper Jurassic (Kimmeridgian–Tithonian, about 152–148 million years ago) and its fossil remains have been found in Germany.

== Description ==
Large in size, this fish easily exceeded one metre in length. Like many other similar genera, Pseudoasthenocormus possessed a robust and compact body, although generally more slender than Asthenocormus. As indicated by the specific epithet, the dorsal fin is set back, originating just behind the anal, and is much shorter than the latter. The dorsal fin is composed of a few rays, which decrease in size posteriorly. The anal fin has become independent, with the rays (about 30) starting almost vertically from the haemal arches. The palate was equipped with small, slightly curved conical teeth. Along the anterior margin of the jaws were larger teeth with laterally compressed bases.

== Etymology ==
The generic name is derived from Asthenocormus, and the specific epithet is after the Greek for "rear fin."

== Classification ==
The first fossils of this animal, found in the famous Solnhofen deposit, were described in 1914 by Eastman, who attributed them to a new species of the genus Asthenocormus (A. retrodorsalis). It was only in 1999 that Lambers redescribed the species, attributing it to a separate genus (Pseudoasthenocormus).

This animal, as well as the related Asthenocormus, was a large representative of the family Pachycormidae, a group of bony fishes close to the origin of the teleosts and including some of the oldest filter-feeding fishes.
