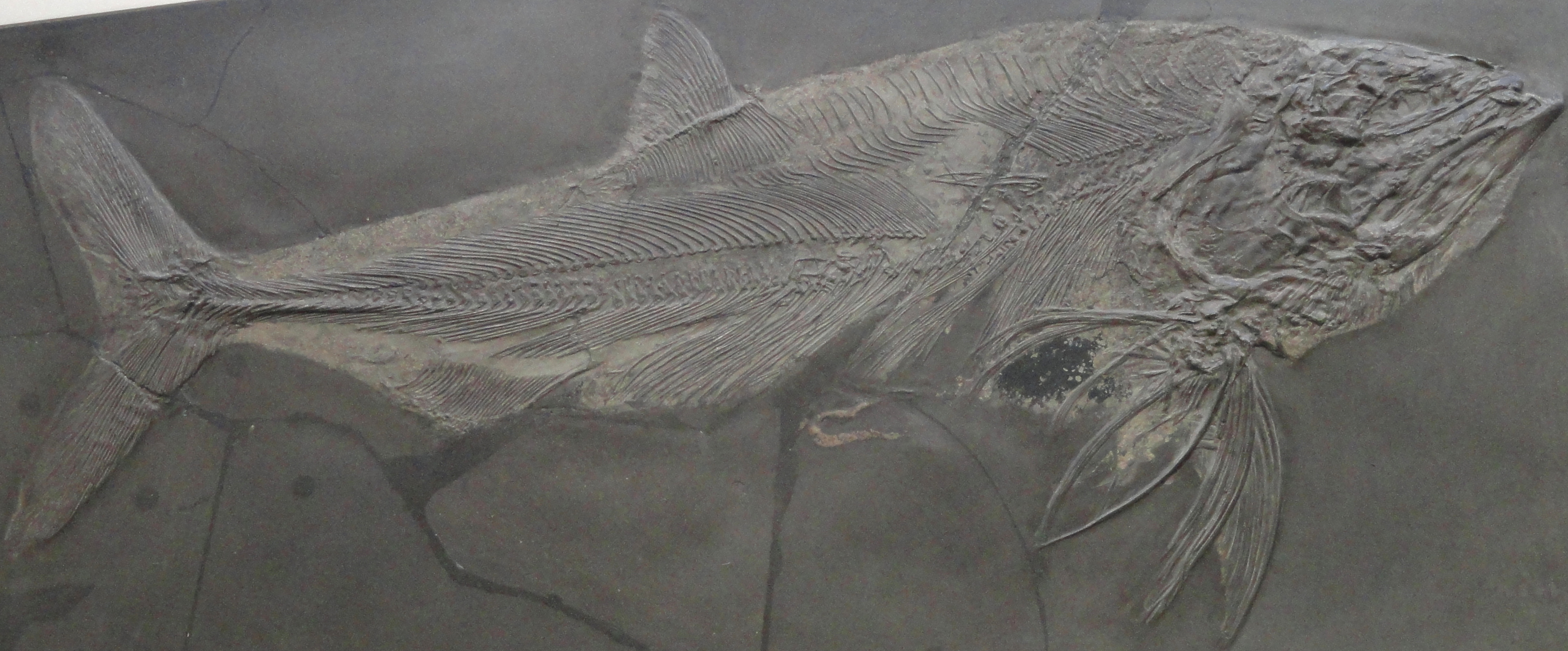
- Skeleton of Pachycormus
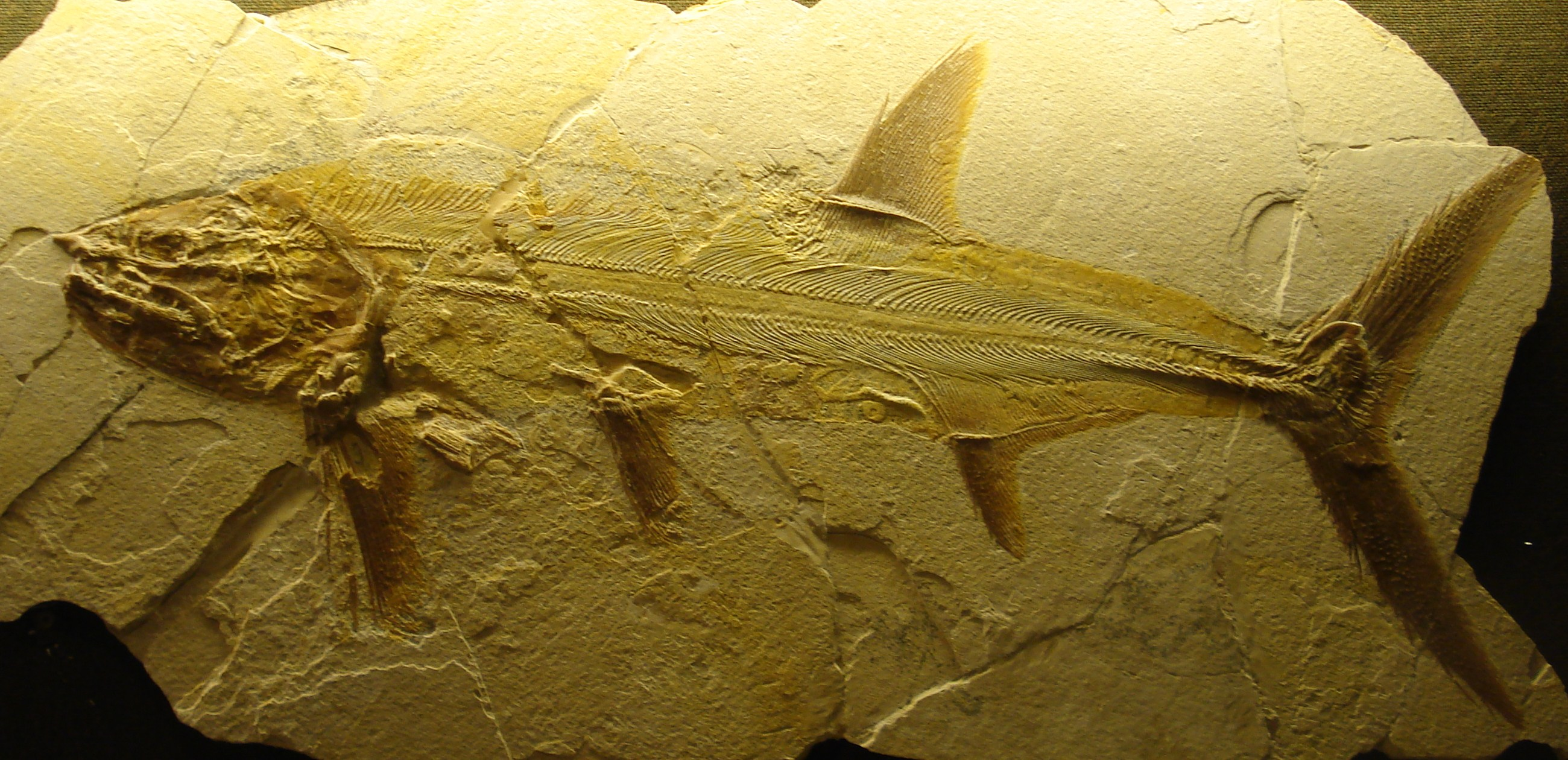
- Skeleton of Orthocormus

Scientific classification
- Kingdom: Animalia
- Phylum: Chordata
- Class: Actinopterygii
- Infraclass: Teleosteomorpha
- Division: †Aspidorhynchei
- Order: †Pachycormiformes; Berg 1937
- Family: †Pachycormidae; Woodward, 1895

Type genus
- Pachycormus Agassiz, 1833

Genera
- See text

Synonyms
- Diphyodontidae Jordan, 1923; Erisichtheidae Cope, 1877b; Microlepidoti Zittel, 1887; Pelecopteridae Cope, 1875; Protosphyraenidae Lydekker, 1889; Sauropsidae Cope, 1877a; Saurotomini [Saurostomini] Bonaparte, 1846 corrig. Bonaparte 1850a

= Pachycormiformes =

Pachycormiformes Temporal range: Early Jurassic - Late Cretaceous, Toarcian–Maastrichtian

Extinct order of ray-finned fishes

Pachycormiformes is an extinct order of marine ray-finned fish known from the Early Jurassic to the end of the Cretaceous. Depending on the treatment, it only includes a single family, Pachycormidae, or two families: the mostly filter-feeding Pachycormidae and the carnivorous Protosphyraenidae. They were characterized by having serrated pectoral fins (though more recent studies demonstrated that fin shape diversity in this group was high), reduced pelvic fins and a bony rostrum. Pachycormiformes are morphologically diverse, containing both tuna and swordfish-like carnivorous forms, as well as edentulous suspension-feeding forms.

== Description ==
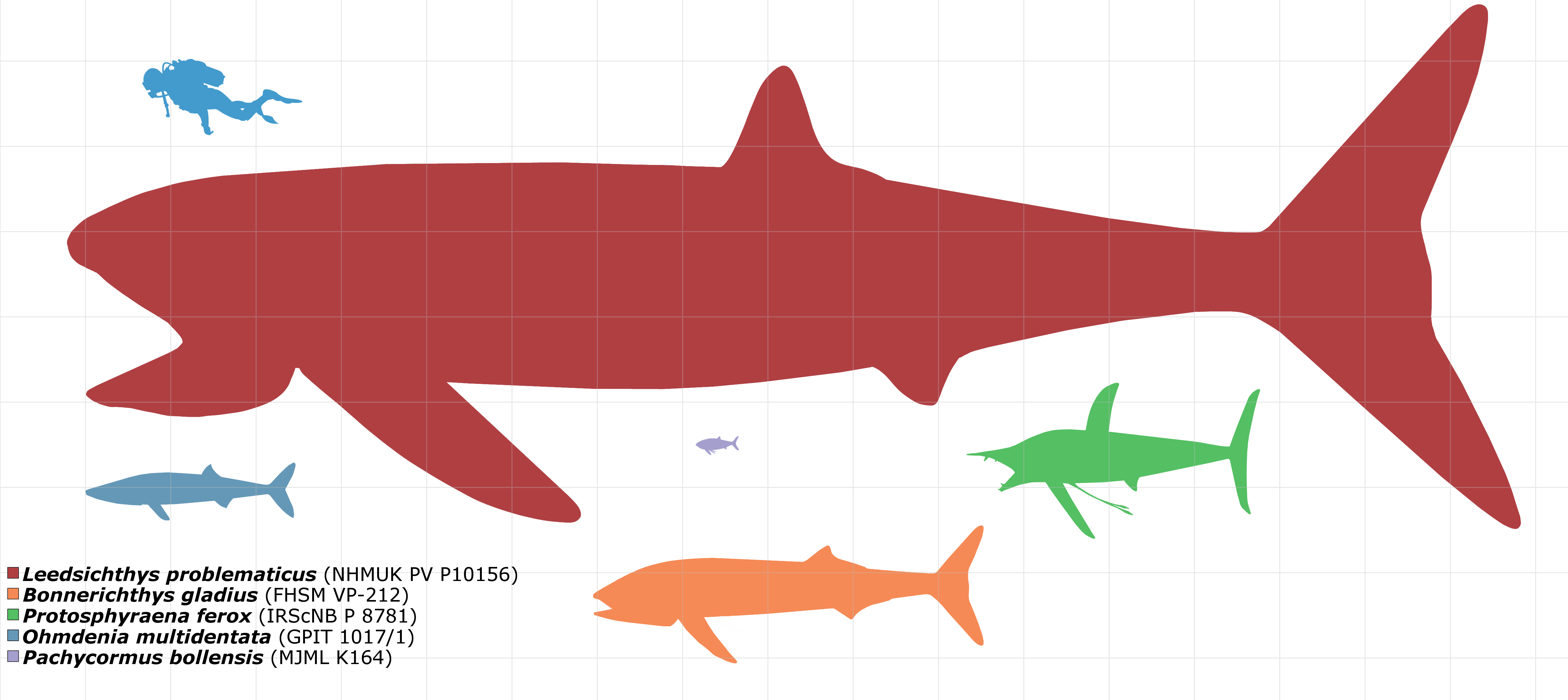
Size comparison of various species of Pachycormiform fish

Pachycormiformes are united by "a compound bone (rostrodermethmoid) forming the anterodorsal border of the mouth; a reduced coronoid process of the mandible; absence of supraorbitals associated with a dermosphenotic defining the dorsal margin of the orbit; two large, plate-like suborbital bones posterior to the infraorbitals; long, slender pectoral fins; asymmetrical branching of pectoral fin lepidotrichia; considerable overlap of the hypurals by caudal fin rays (hypurostegy); and the presence of distinctive uroneural-like ossifications of the caudal fin endoskeleton". Pachycormiformes varied substantially in size, from medium-sized fishes around 40–111 centimetres (1.31–3.64 ft) in length like the macropredator Pachycormus, to the largest known ray-finned fish, the suspension feeding Leedsichthys, which is estimated to have reached a maximum length of around 16 metres (52 ft).

== Evolution ==
=== Relationships ===
Pachycormiformes are generally interpreted as basal members of Teleosteomorpha, the group that includes all fish more closely related to modern teleosts than to Holostei (the group containing bowfin and gars), often they have been considered to be the sister group of the Aspidorhynchiformes.

=== Taxonomy ===
Most authors have long divided the Pachycormiformes into two groups, a filter-feeding clade and a macropredatory clade, but the circumscription of these groups has frequently shifted. Prior to 1895, short-snouted pachycormiforms were placed in the family Pachycormidae, while the unusual long-snouted Protosphyraena was placed in its own family, Protosphyraenidae. In 1895, Protosphyraena was also reclassified by Woodward as a pachycormid. Later studies affirmed the presence of a predatory and a filter-feeding lineage within the order.

In 2022, the two lineages were described as distinct subfamilies: Hypsocorminae for the toothed clade, and Asthenocorminae for the filter-feeding clade. Despite having teeth, Pachycormus was found to be more closely related to the filter-feeding asthenocormines. In 2026, the well-preserved Hypsocormus guschchinae was described, with analysis of its pectoral fin morphology confirming the relationship of short-snouted predatory "hypsocormines" to Protosphyraena. For this reason, the former family Protosphyraenidae was revived for the predatory pachycormiforms that belonged to the same lineage as Protosphyraena.

Taxonomy according to Kanarkina, Zverkov & Valenov (2026):

- Order Pachycormiformes
  - ?Eugnathides Gregory, 1923
  - Haasichthys Delsate, 1999
  - Notodectes Dolgopol de Saez, 1949
  - Superfamily Pachycormoidea
    - Family Pachycormidae Lyddeker, 1889
      - Germanostomus Cooper et al., 2022
      - Saurostomus Agassiz, 1843
      - Subfamily Pachycorminae Lyddeker, 1889
        - Pachycormus Agassiz, 1833
      - Subfamily Asthenocorminae Cooper et al., 2022
        - Asthenocormus Woodward, 1895
        - Bonnerichthys Friedman et al., 2010
        - Leedsichthys Woodward, 1889
        - Martillichthys Liston, 2008
        - Ohmdenia Hauff, 1953
        - Rhinconichthys Friedman et al., 2010
    - Family Protosphyraenidae Woodward, 1888
      - Euthynotus Wagner, 1860 (potentially a basal pachycormiform)
      - Hypsocormus Wagner, 1860
      - Kaykay Gouiric-Cavalli & Arratia, 2022
      - Pseudoasthenocormus Lambers, 1992
      - Sauropsis Agassiz, 1843
      - Simocormus Maxwell et al., 2020
      - Subfamily Protosphyraeninae Woodward, 1888
        - Erisichthe Cope, 1872
        - Paraorthocormus Kanarkina, Zverkov & Valenov, 2026
        - Orthocormus Weitzel, 1930
        - Protosphyraena Leidy, 1857

=== Phylogeny ===
Cladistics according to Friedman et al. (2010).

- Pachycormiformes
  - †Euthynotus
  - - - †Hypsocormus insignis
      - - †"Hypsocormus" tenuirostris
        - - †Orthocormus
          - - †Australopachycormus
            - †Protosphyraena
    - - †Pachycormus
      - Suspension feeding clade
        - - †Asthenocormus titanius
          - †Martillichthys renwickae
        - - †Bonnerichthys gladius
          - - †Leedsichthys problematicus
            - †Rhinconichthys taylori

== Gallery ==
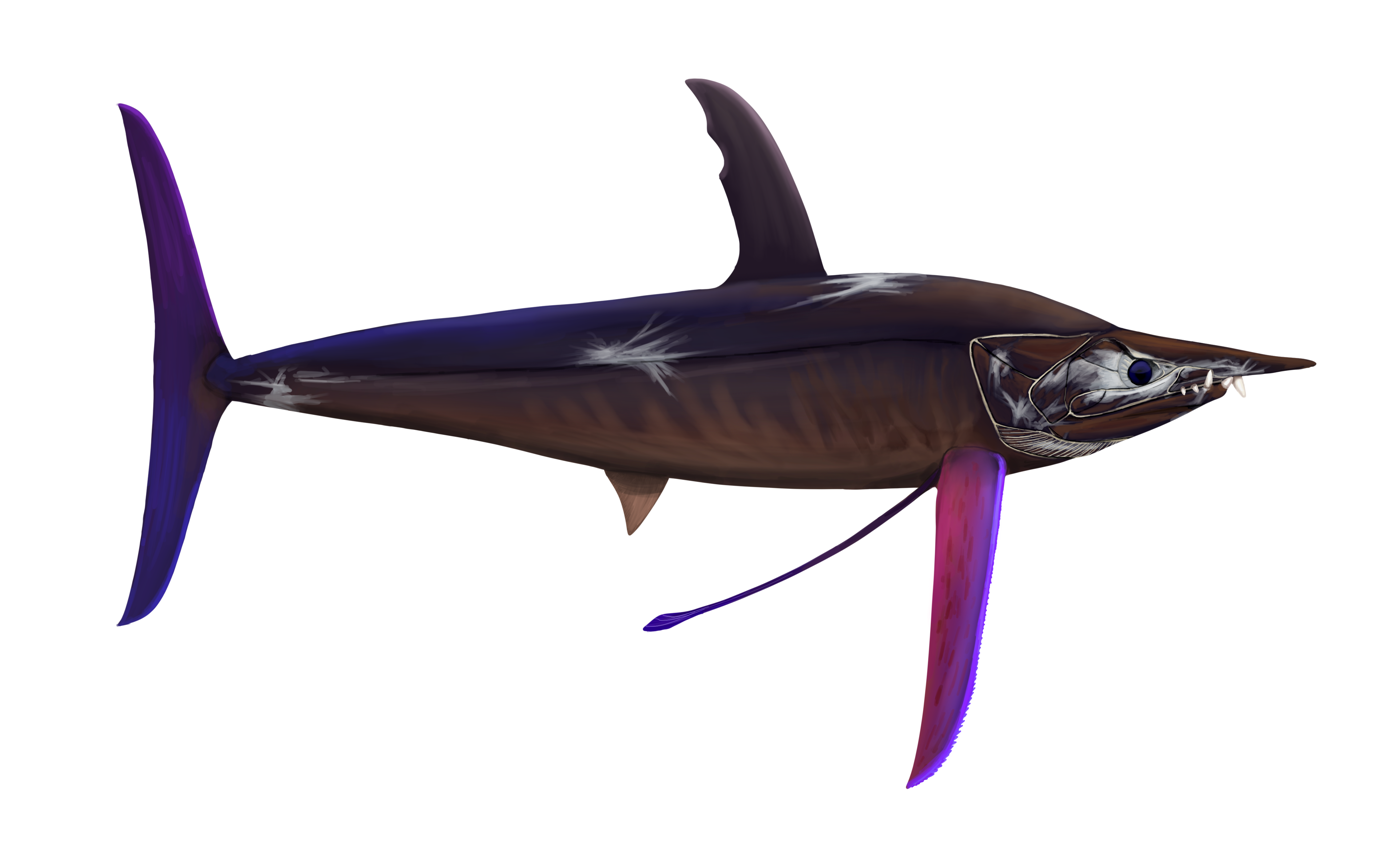
Reconstruction of Protosphyraena perniciosa

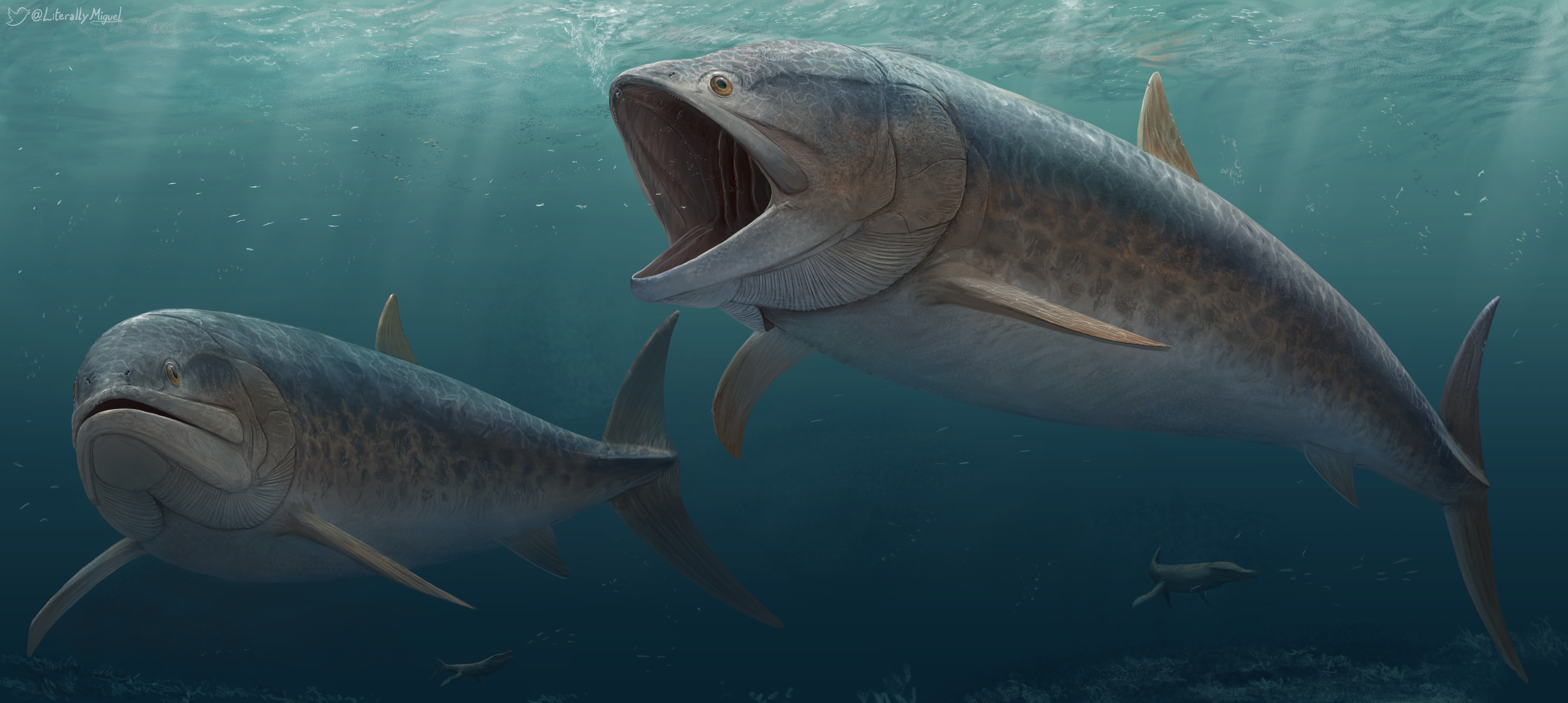
Speculative life restoration of Leedsichthys

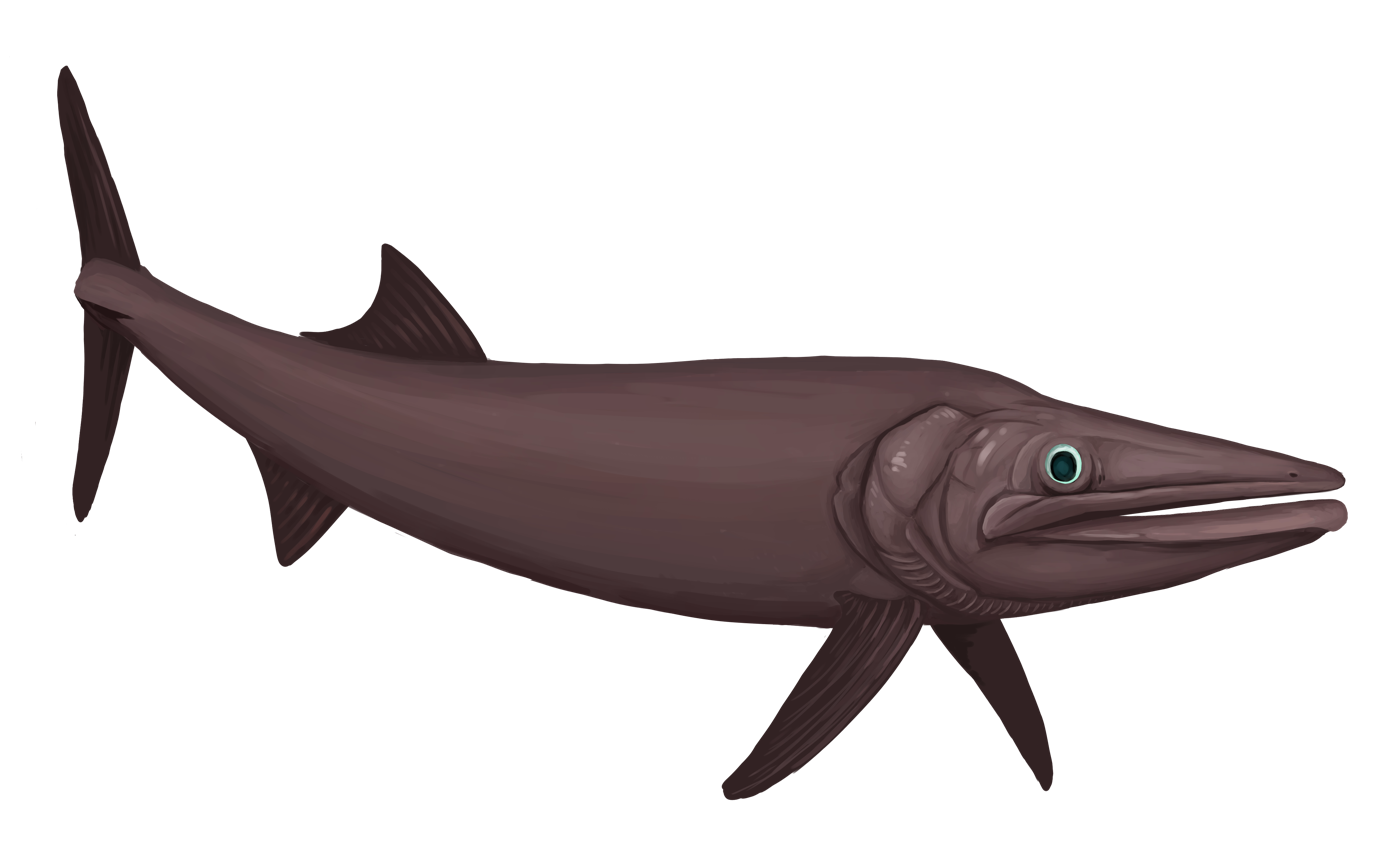
Life restoration of Ohmdenia

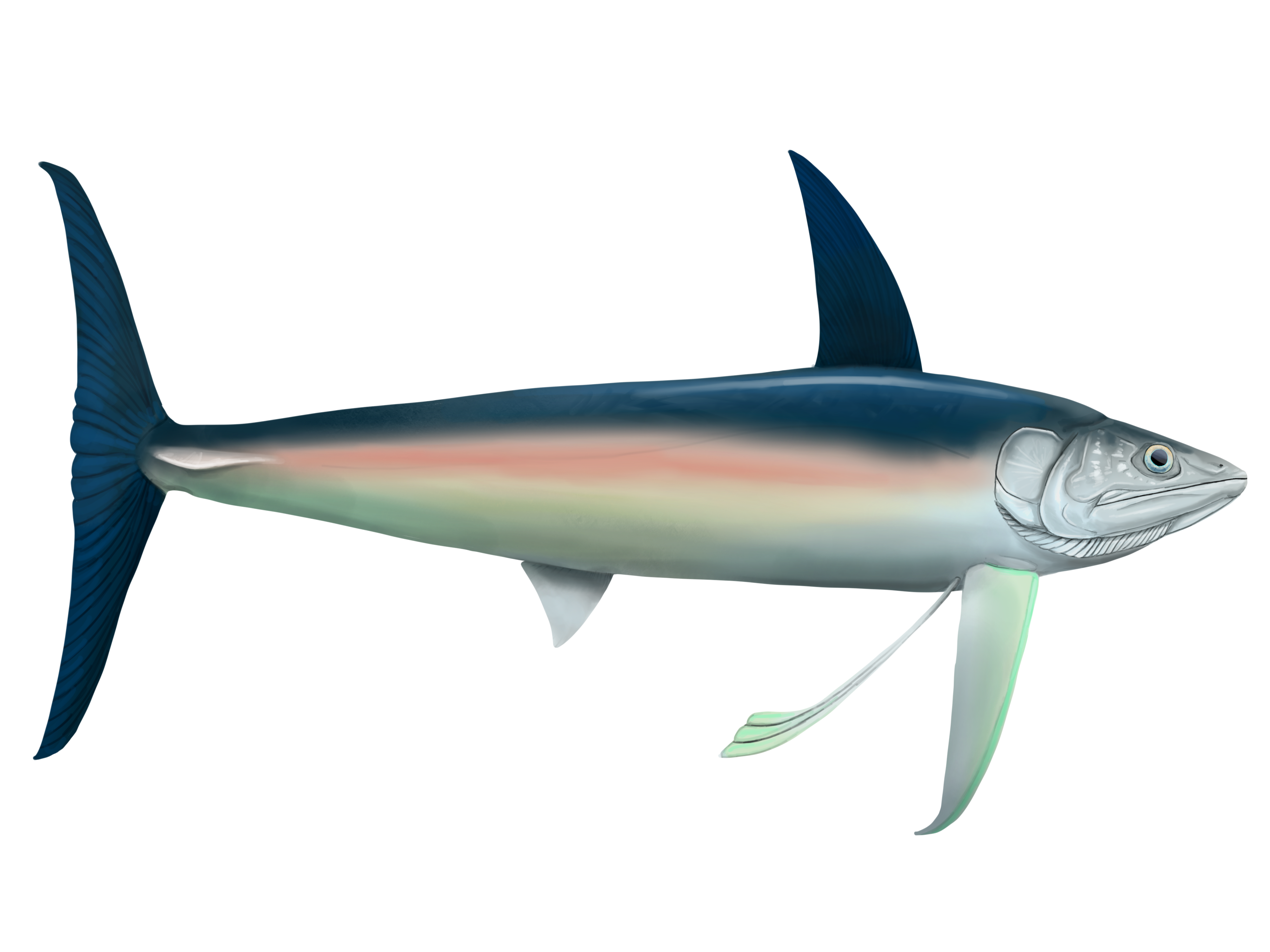
Life restoration of Bonnerichthys

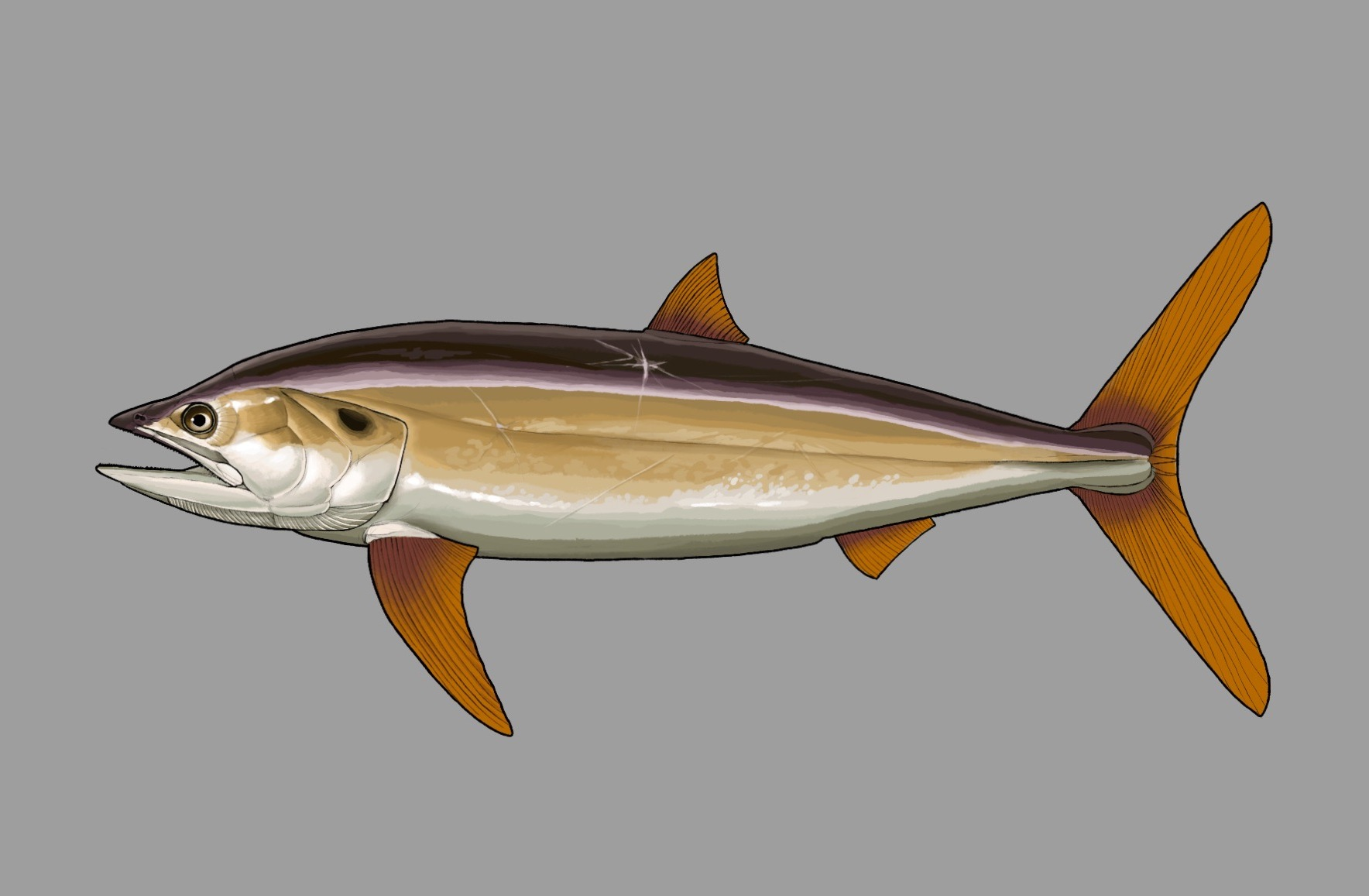
Life restoration of Pachycormus

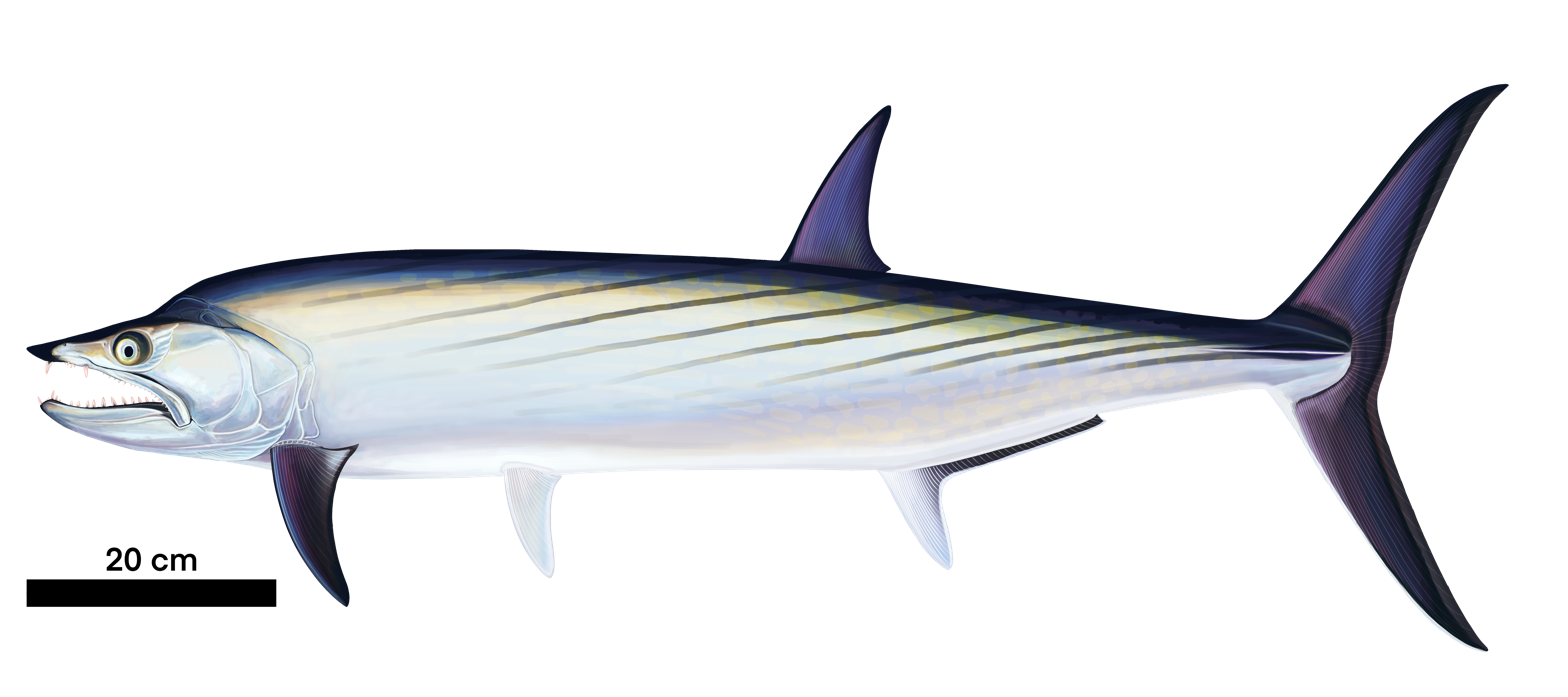
Life restoration of Orthocormus
