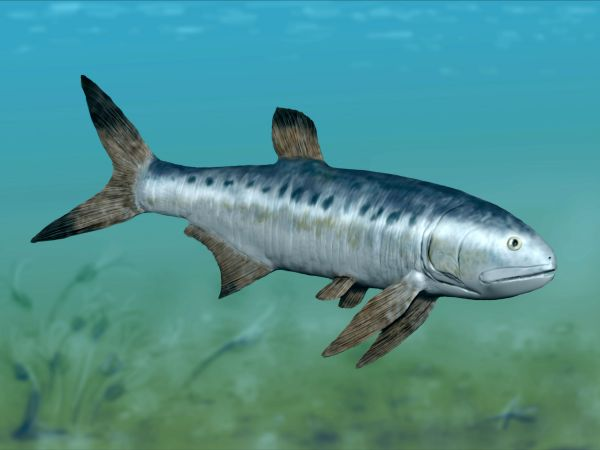

Scientific classification
- Domain: Eukaryota
- Kingdom: Animalia
- Phylum: Chordata
- Class: Actinopterygii
- Order: †Pachycormiformes
- Family: †Pachycormidae
- Genus: †Sauropsis; Agassiz, 1843

= Sauropsis =

Extinct genus of fishes

Sauropsis (from Greek: σαῦρος saûros, 'lizard' and Greek: ὄψῐς ópsis 'looking') is an extinct genus of prehistoric bony fish.

== See also ==
- List of prehistoric bony fish genera
