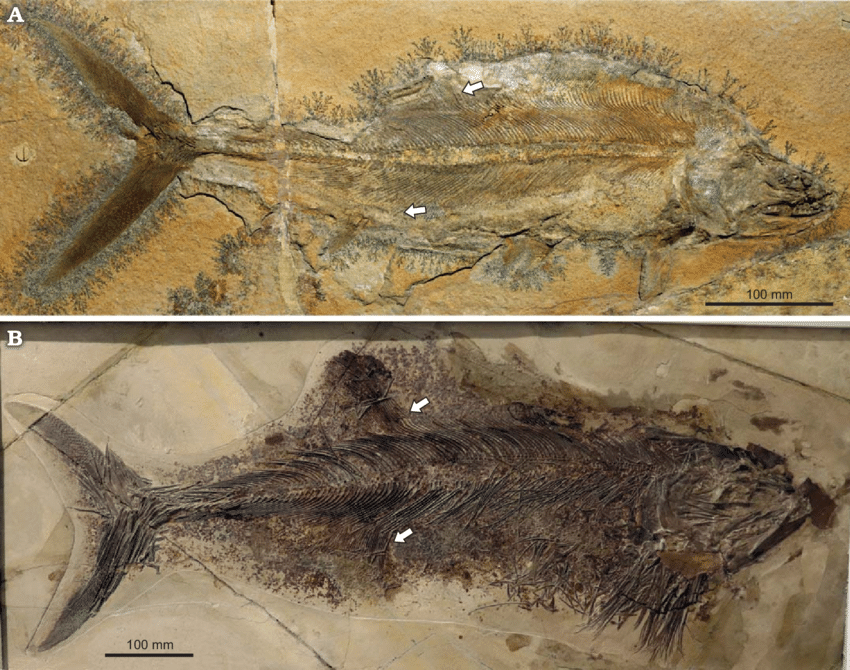
- Hypsocormus insignis (top) and Hypsocormus posterodorsalis (bottom)

Scientific classification
- Kingdom: Animalia
- Phylum: Chordata
- Class: Actinopterygii
- Order: †Pachycormiformes
- Family: †Protosphyraenidae
- Genus: †Hypsocormus; Wagner, 1860

Species
- H. insignis Wagner, 1860; H. posterodorsalis Maxwell et al. 2020

= Hypsocormus =

Hypsocormus Temporal range: Late Jurassic (Kimmeridgian to Tithonian)

Extinct genus of fishes

Hypsocormus (from Greek: ῠ̔́ψος húpsos, 'height' and Greek: κορμός kormós 'timber log') is an extinct genus of marine pachycormid ray-finned fish from the Late Jurassic of Europe. It contains two known species, both known from Germany.

== Taxonomy ==
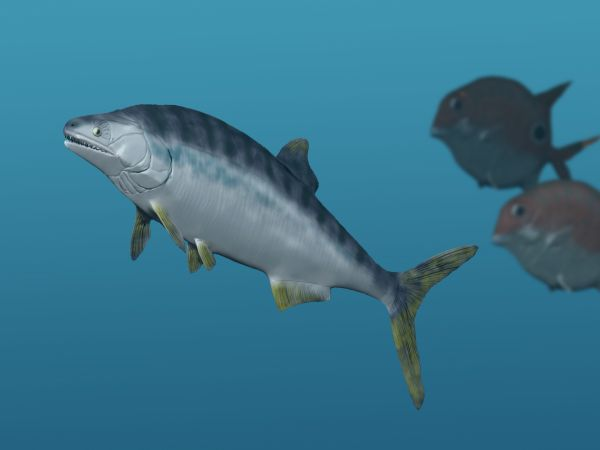
Restoration

The type species, H. insignis, was originally described by Johann Andreas Wagner in 1860 from the Late Jurassic (Tithonian)-aged Solnhofen Limestone of Bavaria, Germany. In 2020, a slightly older species, H. posterodorsalis Maxwell, Lambers, Lopez-Arbarello, Schweigert, 2020 was described from the Kimmeridgian-aged Nusplingen Limestone of Baden-Württemberg.

Other species previously assigned to Hypsocormus have been reclassified. A second species from Nusplingen, "H. macrodon", was initially described by Wagner as Eugnathus macrodon in 1858 based on a now-lost holotype, and reclassified into Hypsocormus by Karl von Zittel in 1887. Multiple other specimens were also later assigned to this same species. In a 2020 study, Maxwell et al determined H. macrodon to be a nomen dubium due to the lost holotype with nonindicative distinguishing features, and reclassified the other specimens assigned to H. macrodon into their own genus, Simocormus. The species "Hypsocormus" tenuirostris from the Middle Jurassic of England is now placed in its own genus, Paraorthocormus. Another species, "H." leedsi Woodward, 1889 from the Middle Jurassic of England is too fragmentary to confidently assign to a genus.

== Description ==
Hypsocormus was a fast-swimming predatory fish about 1 metre (3.3 ft) long, with a half moon-shaped caudal fin similar to that of a modern mackerel. It had a single dorsal fin, elongated pectoral fins and tiny pelvic fins about halfway down the body. An early teleost, Hypsocormus was still primitive, possessing primitive traits such as armored scales. These were, however, small compared with those of earlier fish, allowing greater flexibility. Its jaws were muscular and highly developed, giving it a powerful bite.
