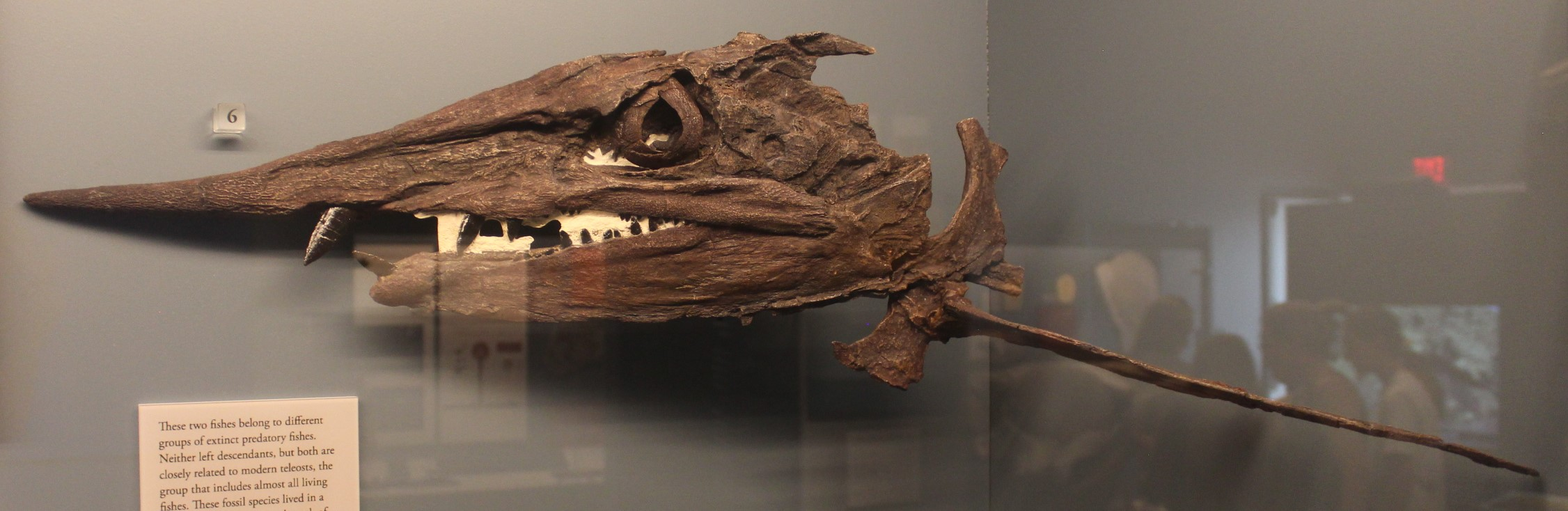
- Skull and pectoral fin fossils of Protosphyraena

Scientific classification
- Kingdom: Animalia
- Phylum: Chordata
- Class: Actinopterygii
- Order: †Pachycormiformes
- Family: †Protosphyraenidae
- Genus: †Protosphyraena; Leidy, 1857

Type species
- †Protosphyraena ferox Leidy, 1857

Species
- †P. ferox (type); †P. bentoniana; †P. compressirostris; †P. gibberula; †P. hurleyi; †P. nitida; †P. perniciosa; †P. sequax; †P. spectabilis; †P. tenuis; †P. terminalis

Synonyms
- Australopachycormus Kear, 2007; Ptychodus arcuatus; Ptychodus gibberulus; Ptychodus spectabilis; Saurocephalus striatus; Protosphyraena terminata (lapsus calami)

= Protosphyraena =

Protosphyraena Temporal range: Cretaceous, Albian–Maastrichtian

Extinct genus of fishes

Protosphyraena is a fossil genus of swordfish-like marine fish, that thrived worldwide during the Cretaceous period (Albian-Maastrichtian). Fossil remains of this taxon are mainly discovered in North America, Europe and Australia, with potential specimens also known from Asia and Africa. Its fossils are best known from the Smoky Hill Member of the Niobrara Formation of Kansas (Late Coniacian-Early Campanian).

Protosphyraena was a large fish, averaging 2–3 metres (6.6–9.8 ft) in length. Protosphyraena shared the Cretaceous oceans with aquatic reptiles, such as mosasaurs and plesiosaurs, as well as with many other species of extinct predatory fish. The name Protosphyraena is a combination of the Greek word protos ("early") plus Sphyraena, the genus name for barracuda, as paleontologists initially mistook Protosphyraena for an ancestral barracuda. Recent research shows that the genus Protosphyraena is not related to the true swordfish family Xiphiidae at all, but belongs to the extinct family Pachycormidae.

== History and taxonomy ==
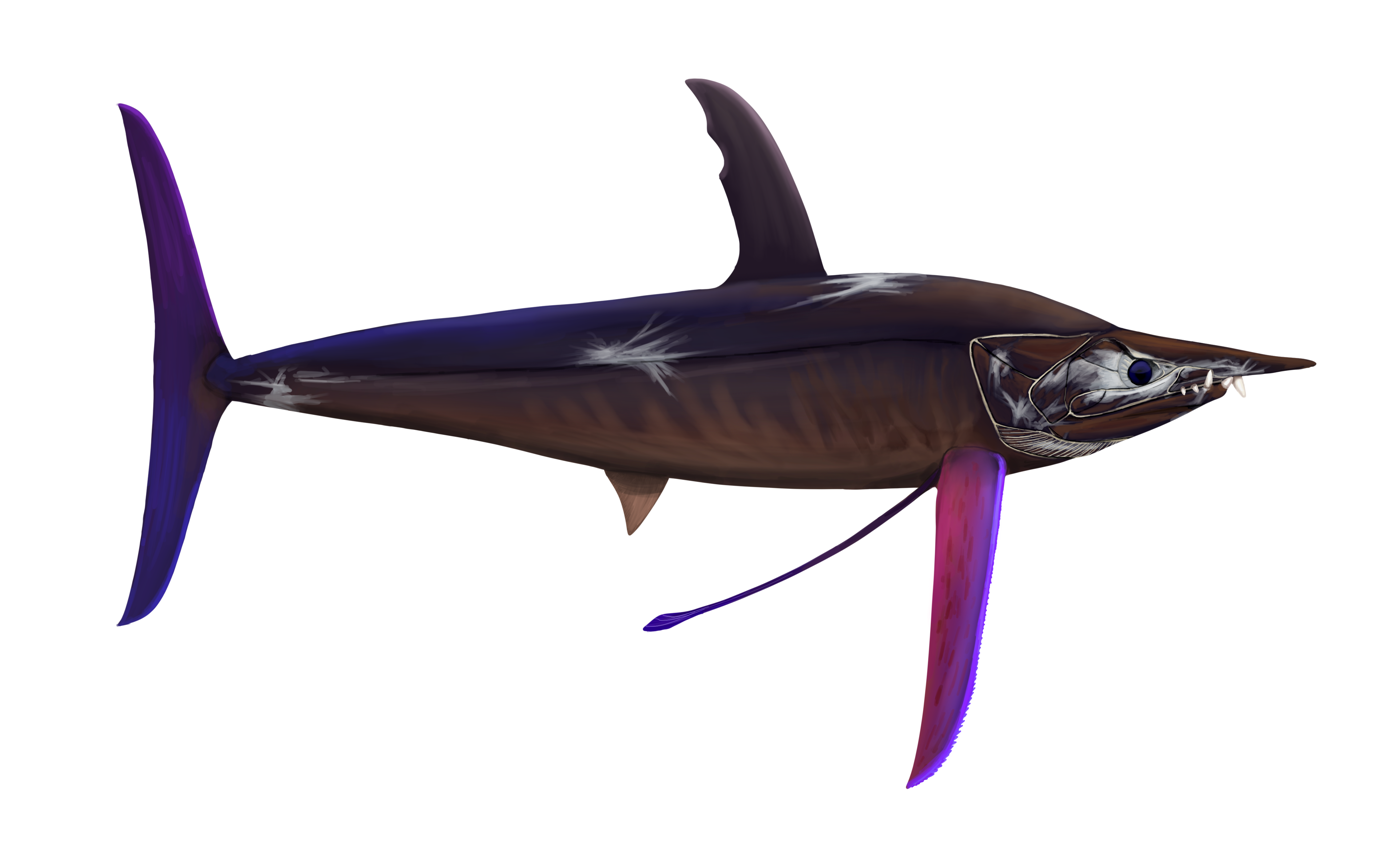
Protosphyraena perniciosa

As is the case with many fossil vertebrates discovered by 19th century paleontologists, the taxonomy of Protosphyraena has had a confusing history. Fossil pectoral spines belonging to this taxon were first recognized in 1822, from chalk deposits in England, by Gideon Mantell, the physician and geologist who also discovered the dinosaur Iguanodon. In 1857, the fish was named Protosphyraena ferox by the renowned American naturalist and paleontologist, Joseph Leidy, based on Mantell's English finds. Earlier, Leidy had published an illustration of a Protosphyraena tooth from the Cretaceous-aged Navesink Formation of New Jersey (Maastrichtian), but mistakenly identified it as having come from a dinosaur. During the 1870s, B. F. Mudge, a fossil collector supplying material to rival paleontologists Edward Drinker Cope and Othniel Charles Marsh, discovered a number of specimens of Protosphyraena in Niobrara exposures in Rooks and Ellis counties in Kansas and sent them back east. Between 1873 and 1877, Cope renamed three species based on Mudge's specimens, all of which would eventually be recognized as belonging to the genus Protosphyraena: Erisichte nitida, "Portheus" gladius, and "Pelecopterus" pernicciosus. Between 1895 and 1903, paleontologists in America and England, including Arthur Smith Woodward (1895), Loomis (1900), O. P. Hay (1903), in a series of important works, reviewed the genus, adding much to our understanding of this fish.

Today, two species of Protosphyraena are recognized from the Niobrara Chalk of the western United States: P. nitida and P. perniciosa. An additional species, P. bentonianum was named by Albin Stewart in 1898, based on a specimen from the older Lincoln Member of the Greenhorn Limestone (Upper Cenomanian). Perhaps the oldest remains of Protosphyraena in North America have come from the upper beds of the Dakota Sandstone (middle Cenomanian) in Russell County, Kansas (Everhart, 2005; p. 91).

The species Australopachycormus hurleyi (meaning "southern Pachycormus" and named after Tom Hurley, who discovered the holotype specimen) was a long-billed pachycormid from the Albian of Queensland, Australia, that was noted to be the earliest Cretaceous pachycormid from the Southern Hemisphere. It was already noted to closely resemble Protosphyraena during its description. Later studies have found Australopachycormus to be indistinguishable from Protosphyraena, and they have thus been synonymized. The presence of Protosphyraena in Australia suggests that it had already achieved a very wide global distribution early on in its evolutionary history. In 2026, Kanarkina and colleagues compared various Albian protosphyraenine specimens including the articulated skull from the United Kingdom and the holotype of Australopachycormus, and concluded that the proposed differences remain unclear.

== Anatomy ==
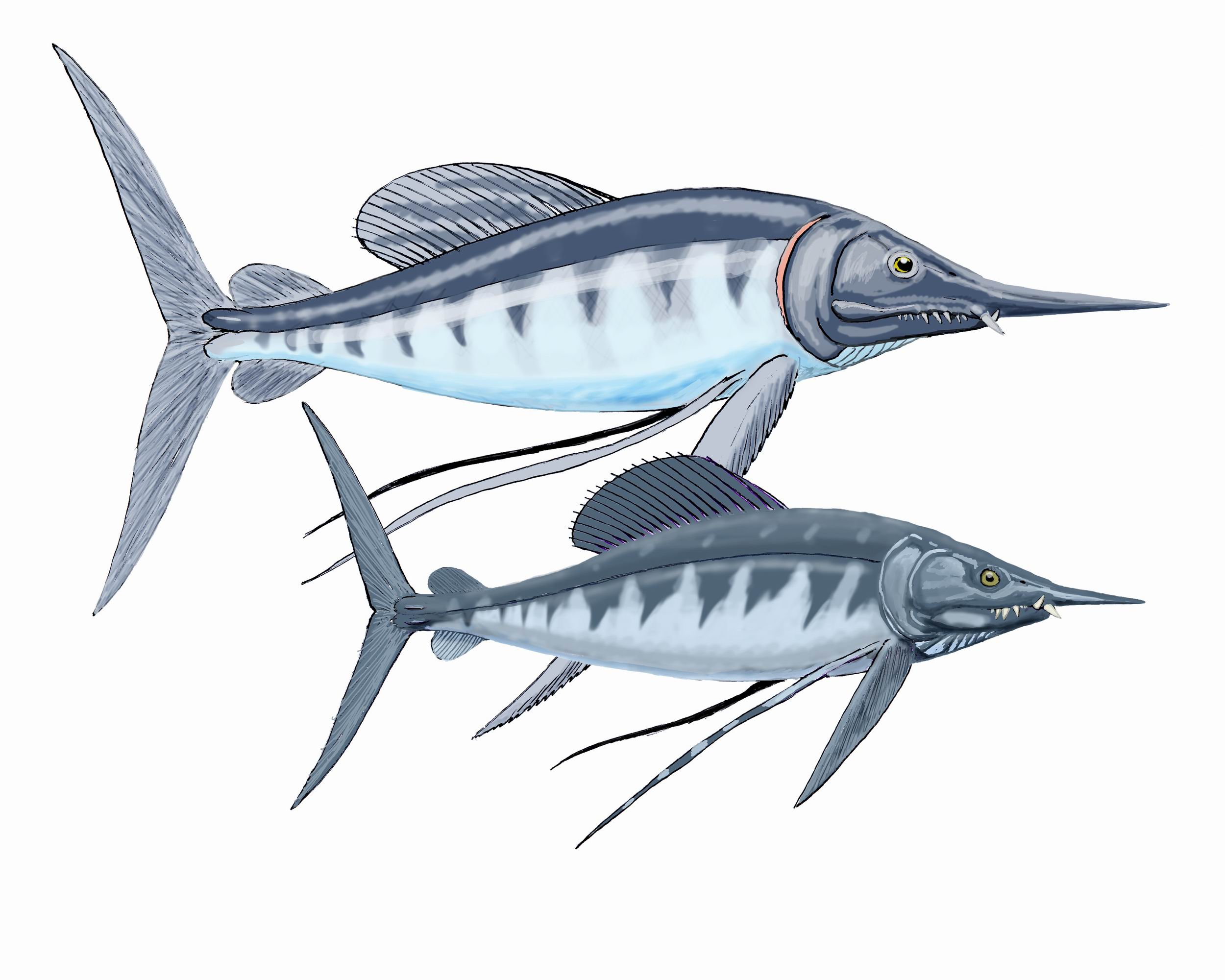
Two species of Kansas Protosphyraena - the larger (about 3 m long) P. perniciosa and smaller P. nitida

In its general body plan, Protosphyraena resembled a modern sailfish, though it was smaller with a shorter rostrum, was somewhat less hydrodynamic, and adults possessed large blade-like teeth (adults of living swordfish species are toothless). Complete skeletons of Protosphyraena are relatively rare, but in parts of the Niobrara Chalk, the Mooreville Chalk Formation of Alabama, and other geological formations, fragmentary specimens are quite common and most often include isolated teeth, the distinctive rostrum, and fragments of the long saw-edged pectoral fin first described by Mantell. Usually, portions of the skull and postcranial skeleton are found separately. This preservational bias can be explained by the fact that the skeleton of Protosphyraena was less ossified than that of most bony fishes and tended to be torn apart by scavengers or decay before burial and fossilization (Everhart, 2005; p. 93). Like most of the Cretaceous marine fauna, Protosphyraena became extinct at the end of the Mesozoic; the resemblance to living swordfish apparently results from convergent evolution.

== Gallery ==
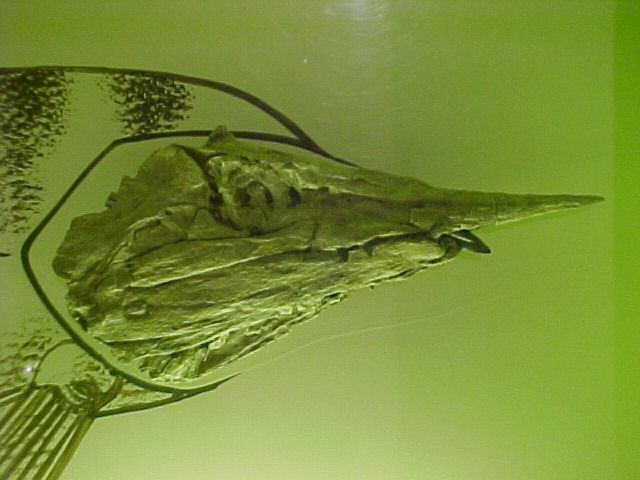
Skull fossil

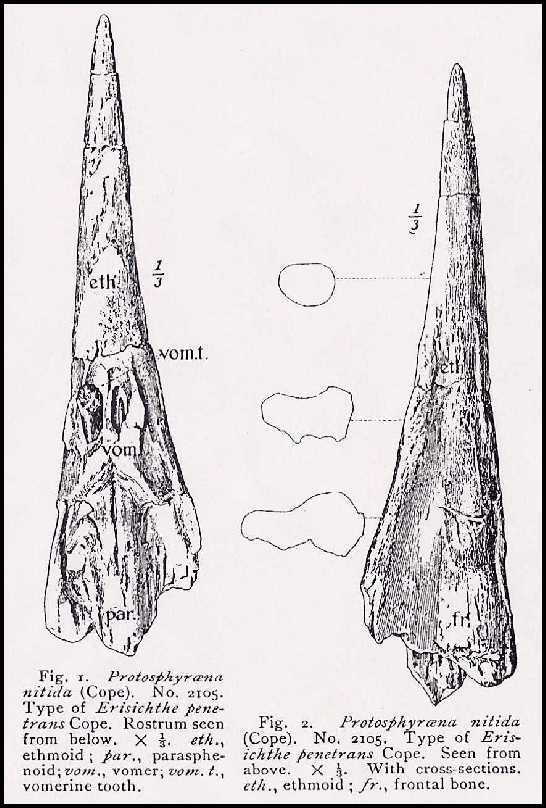
Holotype rostrum of Protosphyraena nitida (from Hay, 1903)

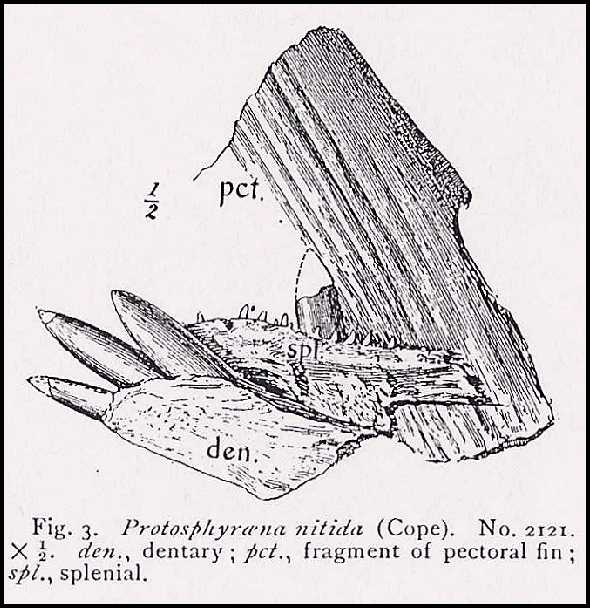
Holotype of Protosphyraena nitida (from Hay, 1903); portions of dentary, splenial, pectoral fin

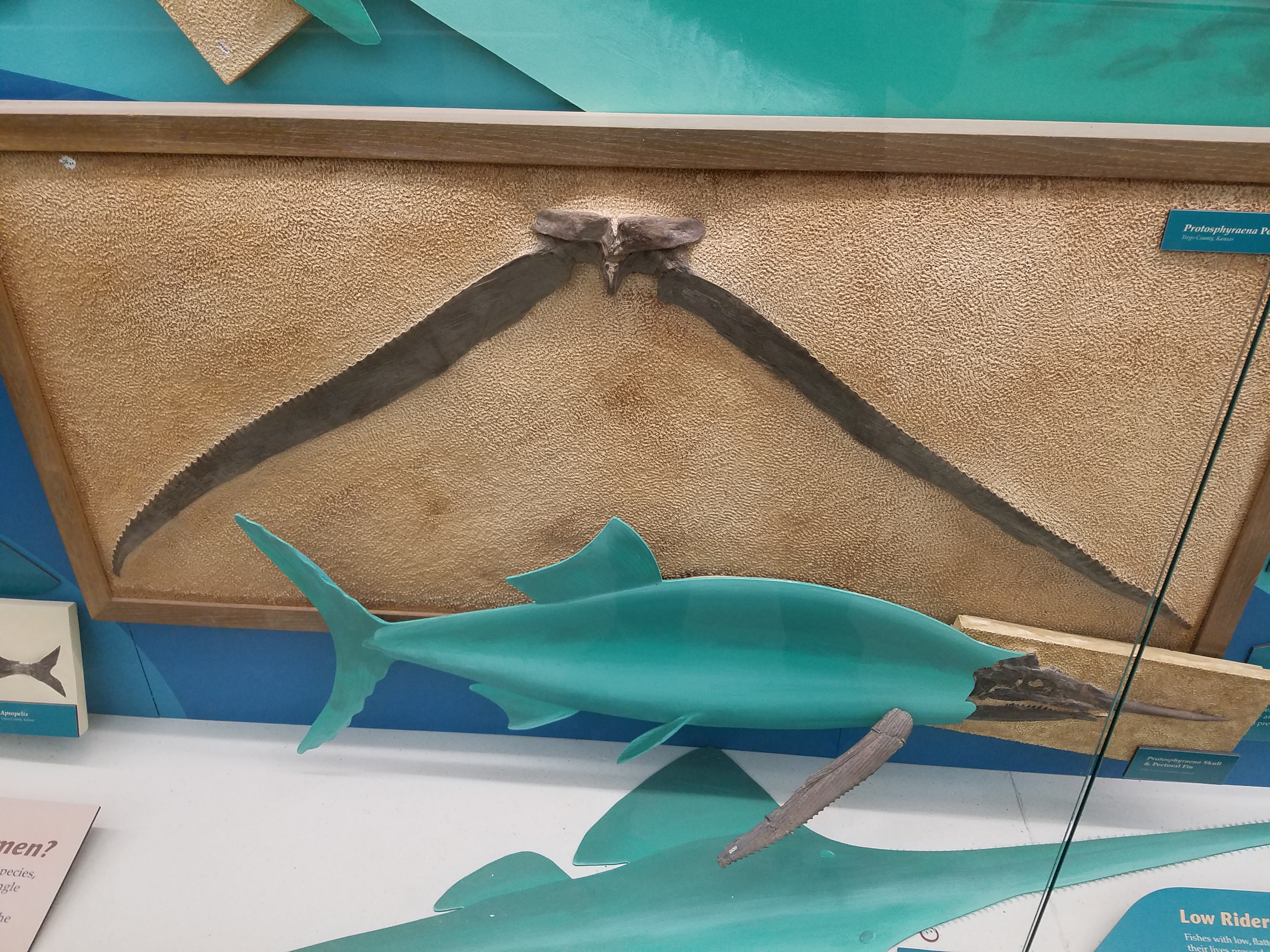
Pectoral girdle of Protosphyraena perniciosa and other fossils
