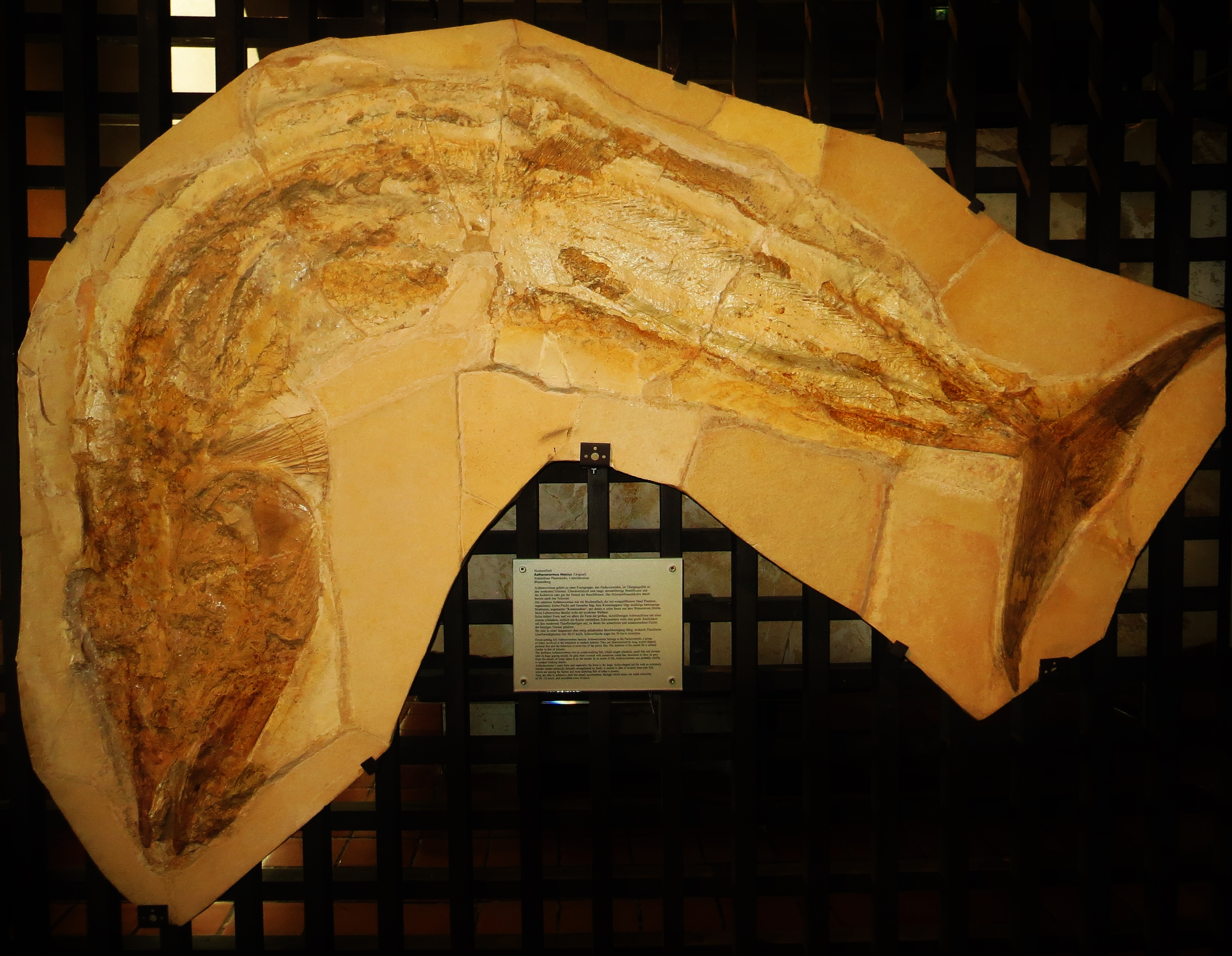
- Fossil of Asthenocormus

Scientific classification
- Kingdom: Animalia
- Phylum: Chordata
- Class: Actinopterygii
- Order: †Pachycormiformes
- Family: †Pachycormidae
- Subfamily: †Asthenocorminae
- Genus: †Asthenocormus; Woodward, 1895
- Species: †A. titanius

Binomial name
- †Asthenocormus titanius (Wagner, 1863)

Synonyms
- Eugnathus titanius Wagner, 1863

= Asthenocormus =

Asthenocormus Temporal range: Early Tithonian

Extinct genus of fishes

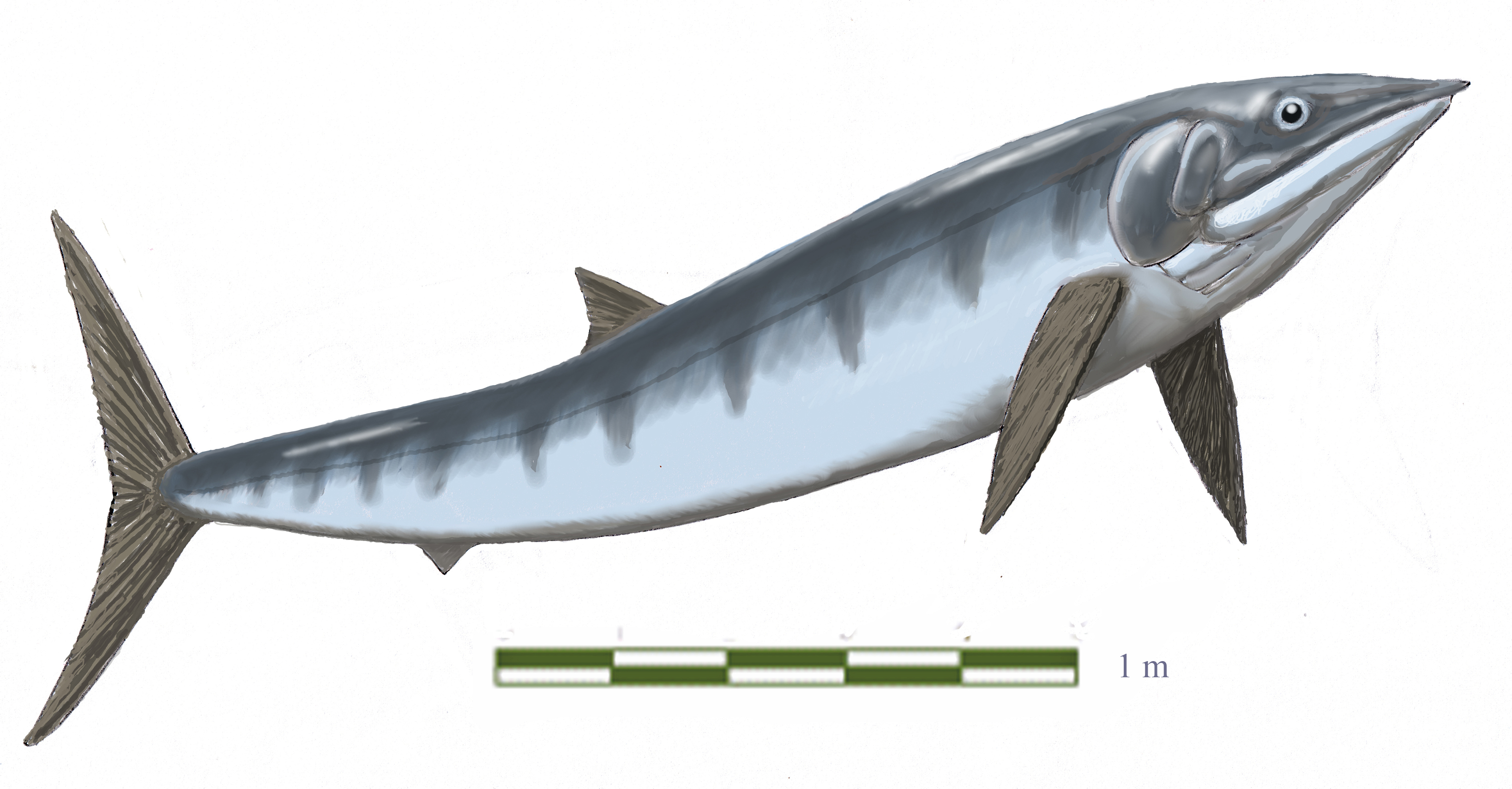
Restoration

Asthenocormus is an extinct genus of large marine pachycormiform ray-finned fish. It contains a single species, A. titanius. A member of the edentulous suspension feeding clade within the Pachycormiformes, fossils have been found in the Late Jurassic (Tithonian)-aged plattenkalks of Bavaria, Germany, primarily from the Solnhofen Limestone. In 2024, a partial caudal fin of an indeterminate Asthenocormus (tentatively assigned to A. titanius) was described from lower Tithonian-aged Kimmeridge Clay of England.

== See also ==
- Prehistoric fish
- List of prehistoric bony fish
