= List of examples of convergent evolution =

Examples of separate lineages of organisms developing similar characteristics

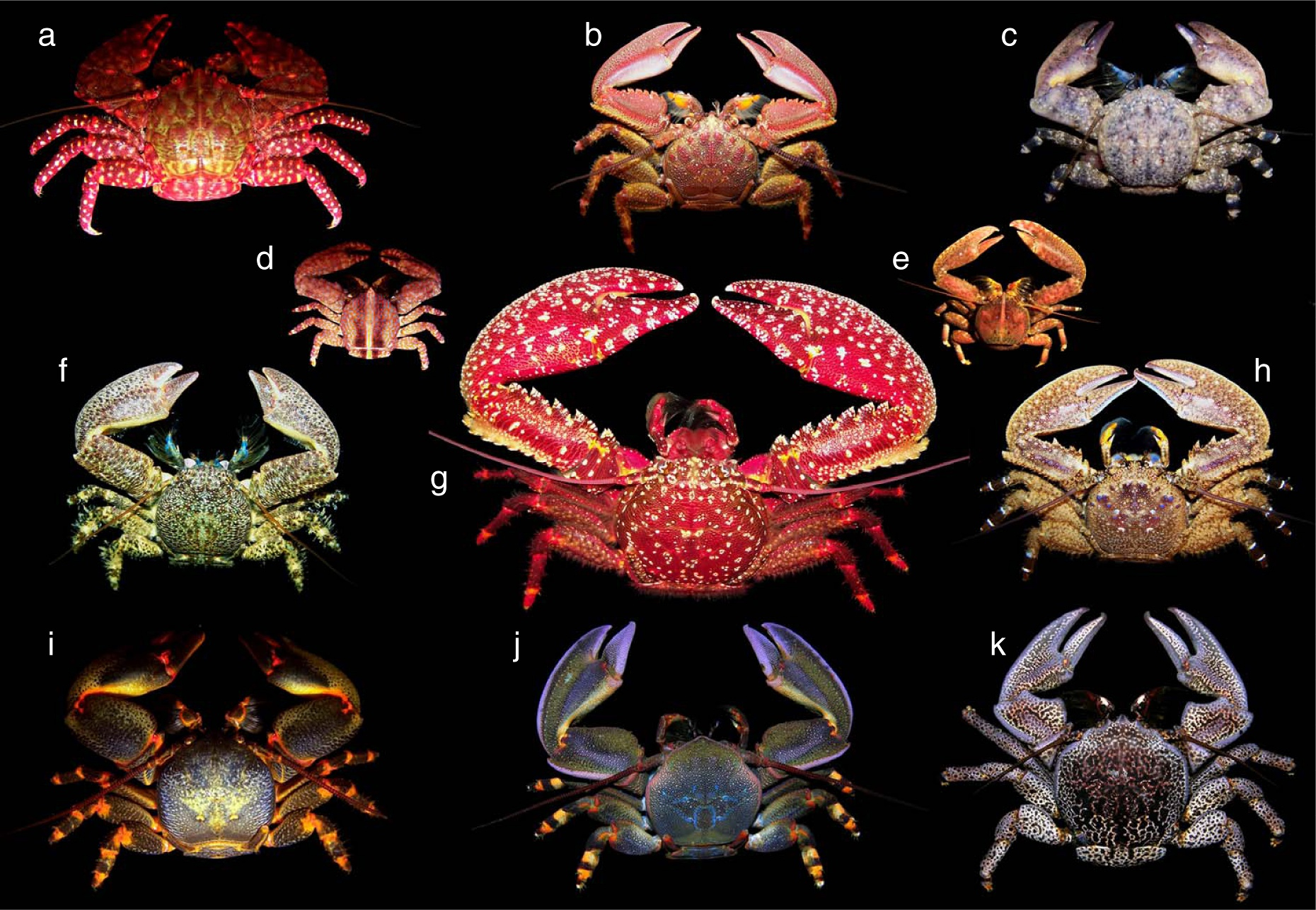
An example of convergent evolution is carcinization, which is the convergent evolution of crustaceans to a crab-like body plan

Convergent evolution—the repeated evolution of similar traits in multiple lineages which all ancestrally lack the trait—is rife in nature, as illustrated by the examples below. The ultimate cause of convergence is usually a similar evolutionary biome, as similar environments will select for similar traits in any species occupying the same ecological niche, even if those species are only distantly related. In the case of cryptic species, it can create species which are only distinguishable by analysing their genetics. Distantly related organisms often develop analogous structures by adapting to similar environments.

== In animals ==
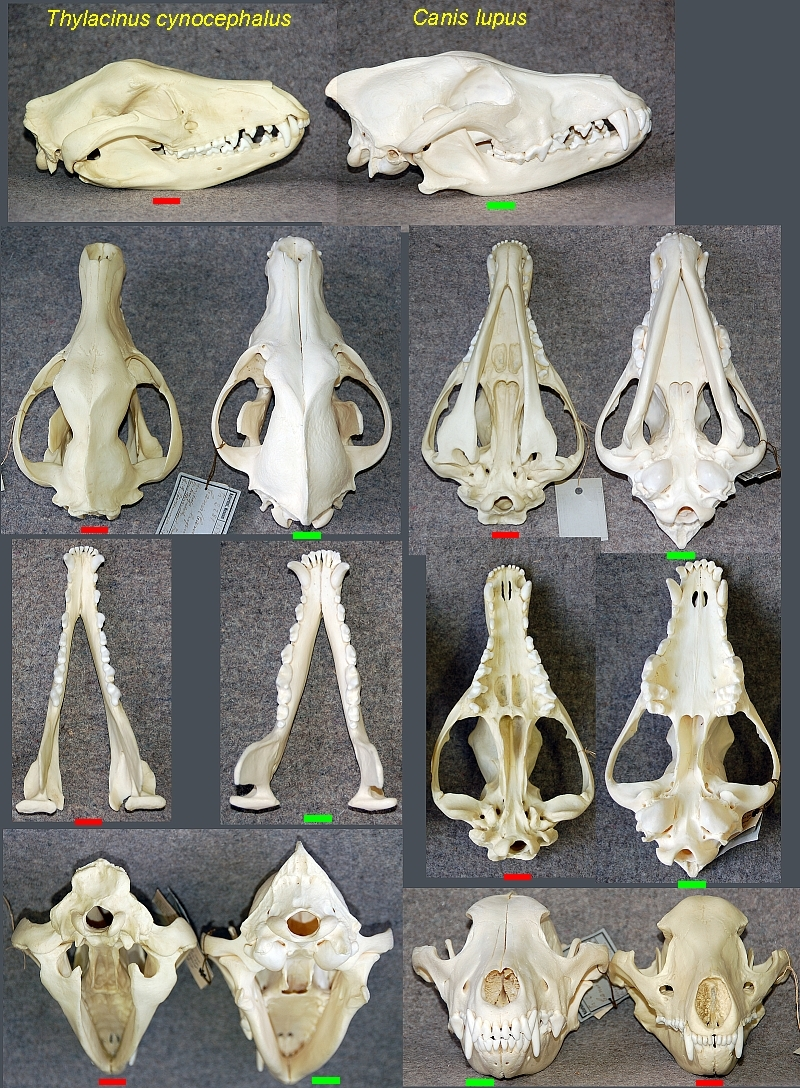
The skulls of the thylacine (left) and the grey wolf, Canis lupus, are similar, although the species are only very distantly related (different infraclasses). The skull shape of the red fox, Vulpes vulpes, is even closer to that of the thylacine.

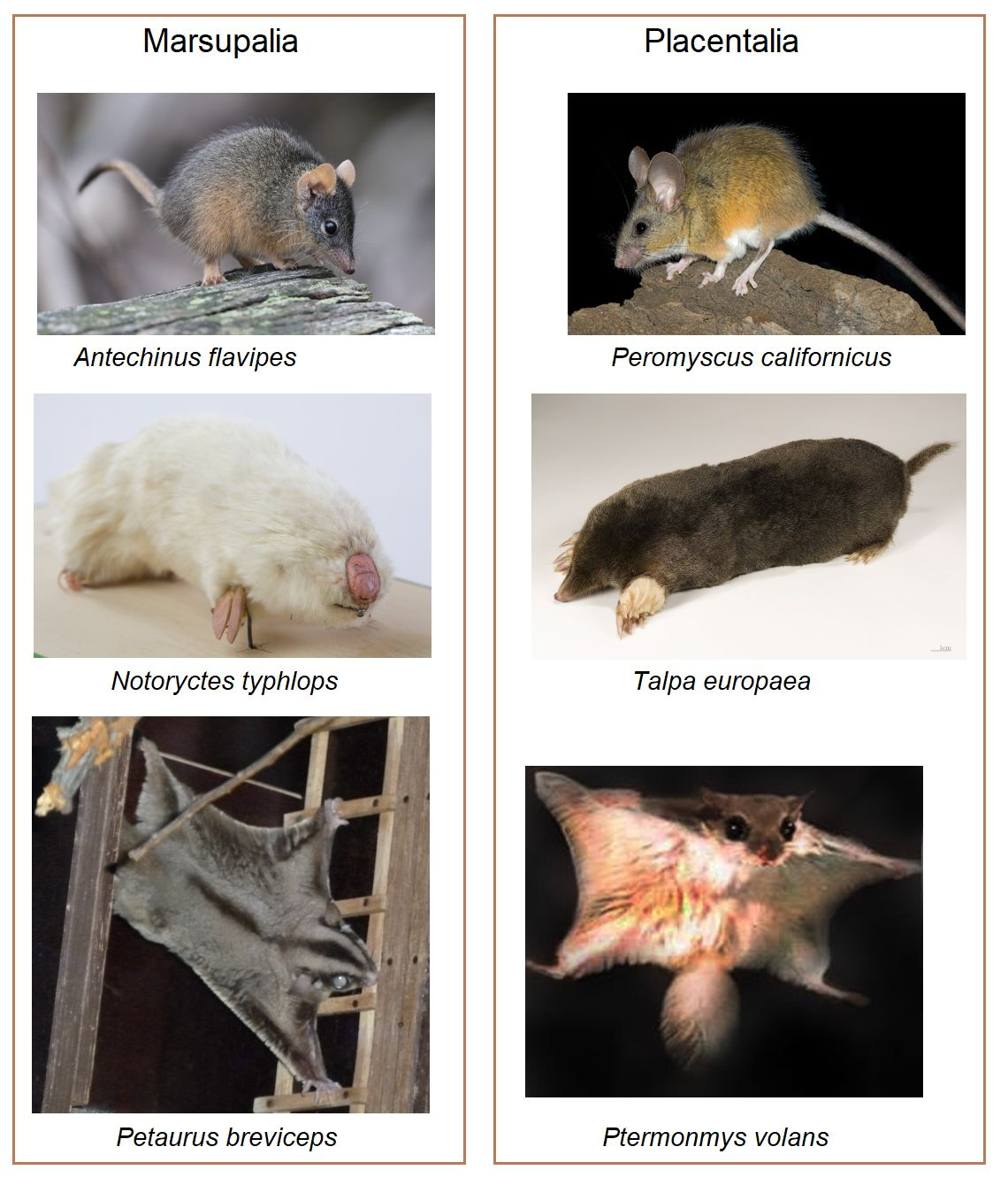
Species in Marsupialia in Australia (left column) and Placentalia in Europe and America (right column) resulting from convergent evolution.

=== Mammals ===
- Several groups of ungulates have independently reduced or lost side digits on their feet, often leaving one or two digits for walking. That name comes from their hooves, which have evolved from claws several times. For example, horses have one walking digit and domestic bovines two on each foot. Various other land vertebrates have also reduced or lost digits.
- Similarly, laurasiathere perissodactyls and afrothere paenungulates have several features in common, to the point of there being no obvious distinction among basal taxa of both groups.
- Many aquatic mammals or marine mammals independently came to have adaptations to live in water, such as similar-looking tail flukes in dugongs and whales. Unrelated herbivores and carnivores have adapted to marine and freshwater environments.
- The flipper forelimbs of marine mammals (cetaceans, pinnipeds, and sirenians) are a classic example of convergent evolution. There is widespread convergence at the gene level. Distinct substitutions in common genes created various aquatic adaptations, most of which also constitute parallel evolution because the substitutions in question are not unique to those animals.
- The pronghorn of North America, while not a true antelope and only distantly related to them, closely resembles the true antelopes of the Old World, both behaviorally and morphologically. It also fills a similar ecological niche and is found in the same biomes.
- Members of the two clades Australosphenida and Theria evolved tribosphenic molars independently.
- The marsupial thylacine (Tasmanian tiger or Tasmanian wolf) had many resemblances to placental canids.
- Several mammal groups have independently evolved prickly protrusions of the skin – echidnas (monotremes), the insectivorous hedgehogs, some tenrecs (a diverse group of shrew-like Malagasy mammals), Old World porcupines (rodents) and New World porcupines (another biological family of rodents). In this case, because the two groups of porcupines are closely related, they would be considered to be examples of parallel evolution; however, neither echidnas, nor hedgehogs, nor tenrecs are close relatives of the Rodentia. In fact, the last common ancestor of all of these groups lived in the age of the dinosaurs. The eutriconodont Spinolestes that lived in the Early Cretaceous Period represents an even earlier example of a spiny mammal, unrelated to any modern mammal group.
- Catlike sabre-toothed predators evolved in three distinct lineages of mammals – carnivorans like the sabre-toothed cats, and nimravids ("false" sabre-tooths), the sparassodont family Thylacosmilidae ("marsupial" sabre-tooths), the gorgonopsids and the creodonts also developed long canine teeth, but with no other particular physical similarities.
- A number of mammals have developed powerful fore claws and long, sticky tongues that allow them to open the homes of social insects (e.g., ants and termites) and consume them (myrmecophagy). These include the four species of anteater, more than a dozen armadillos, eight species of pangolin (plus fossil species), eight species of the monotreme (egg-laying mammals) echidna (plus fossil species), the Fruitafossor of the Late Jurassic, the marsupial numbat, the African aardvark, the aardwolf, and possibly also the sloth bear of South Asia, all unrelated.
- Marsupial koalas of Australia have evolved fingerprints, indistinguishable from those of non-related primates, such as humans.
- The Australian honey possums acquired a long tongue for taking nectar from flowers, a structure similar to that of butterflies, some moths, and hummingbirds, and used to accomplish the same task.
- The marsupial sugar glider and squirrel glider of Australia are like the placental flying squirrel. Both lineages have independently developed wing-like flaps (patagia) for leaping from trees, and big eyes for foraging at night.
- The North American kangaroo rat, Australian hopping mouse, and North African and Asian jerboa have developed convergent adaptations for hot desert environments; these include a small rounded body shape with large hind legs and long thin tails, a characteristic bipedal hop, and nocturnal, burrowing and seed-eating behaviours. These rodent groups fill similar niches in their respective ecosystems.
- Opossums and their Australasian cousins have evolved an opposable thumb, a feature which is also commonly found in the non-related primates.
- The marsupial moles have many resemblances to the placental talpid moles and golden moles.
- Marsupial mulgaras have many resemblances to placental mice.
- Planigale has many resemblances to the deer mouse.
- The marsupial Tasmanian devil has many resemblances to the placental hyena or a wolverine. Similar skull morphology, large canines and crushing carnassial molars.
- Marsupial kangaroos and wallabies have many resemblances to the springhares, the viscachas (rodents which are also related to chinchillas), the maras (a large rodent from the cavy family (Caviidae)), and rabbits and hares (lagomorphs).
- The marsupial lion, Thylacoleo carnifex, had retractable claws, the same way the placental felines (cats) do today.
- Microbats, toothed whales and shrews developed sonar-like echolocation systems used for orientation, obstacle avoidance and for locating prey. Modern DNA phylogenies of bats have shown that the traditional suborder of echolocating bats (Microchiroptera) is not a true clade, and instead some echolocating bats are more related to non-echolocating Old World fruit bats than to other echolocating species. The implication is that echolocation in at least two lineages of bats, Megachiroptera and Microchiroptera has evolved independently or been lost in Old World fruit bats.
- Echolocation in bats and whales also both necessitate high frequency hearing. The protein prestin, which confers high hearing sensitivity in mammals, shows molecular convergence between the two main clades of echolocating bats, and also between bats and dolphins. Other hearing genes also show convergence between echolocating taxa. A genome-wide study of convergence published in 2013 analysed 22 mammal genomes and revealed that tens of genes have undergone the same replacements in echolocating bats and cetaceans, with many of these genes encoding proteins that function in hearing and vision.
- Both the aye-aye lemur and the striped possum have an elongated finger used to get invertebrates from trees. There are no woodpeckers in Madagascar or Australia where the species evolved, so the supply of invertebrates in trees was large.
- Castorocauda, a Jurassic Period mammal and beavers both have webbed feet and a flattened tail, but are not related.
- Prehensile tails evolved in a number of unrelated species marsupial opossums, their Australasian cousins, kinkajous, New World monkeys, tree-pangolins, tree-anteaters, porcupines, rats, skinks and chameleons, and the salamander Bolitoglossa.
- Pig form, large-headed, pig-snouted and hoofs are independent in true pigs in Eurasia, peccaries in South America and the extinct entelodonts.
- Tapirs and pigs look much alike, but tapirs are perissodactyls (odd-toed ungulates) and pigs are artiodactyls (even-toed ungulates).
- Filter feeding: baleen whales like the humpback and blue whale (mammals), the whale shark and the basking shark separately, the manta ray, the Mesozoic bony fish Leedsichthys, and the early Paleozoic anomalocaridid Aegirocassis have separately evolved ways of sifting plankton from marine waters.
- The monotreme platypus has what looks like a bird's beak (hence its scientific name Ornithorhynchus), but is a mammal. However, it is not structurally similar to a bird beak (or any "true" beak, for that matter), being fleshy instead of keratinous.
- Red blood cells in mammals lack a cell nucleus. In comparison, the red blood cells of other vertebrates have nuclei; the only known exceptions are salamanders of the genus Batrachoseps and fish of the genus Maurolicus.
- Caniforms like skunks and raccoons in North and South America and feliforms such as mongoose and civets in Asia and Africa have both evolved to fill the niche of small to medium omnivore/insectivore on their side of the world. Some species of mongoose and civet can even spray their attacker with musk similar to the skunk and some civets have also independently evolved similar markings to the raccoon such as the African civet.
- River dolphins of the three species that live exclusively in freshwater, live in different rivers: Ganges and Brahmaputra Rivers of India, the Yangtze River of China, and the Amazon River. Mitochondrial and nuclear DNA sequence analysis demonstrates the three are not related.
- Mangabeys comprise three different genera of Old World monkeys. The genera Lophocebus and Cercocebus resemble each other and were once thought to be closely related, so much so that all the species were in one genus. However, it is now known that Lophocebus is more closely related to baboons, while the Cercocebus is more closely related to the mandrill.
- Sperm whales and the microscopic copepods both use the same buoyancy control system.
- The wombat is a marsupial that is often considered to be the marsupial equivalent of the North American groundhog.
- The fossa of Madagascar looks like a small cat. Fossa have semi-retractable claws. Fossa also has flexible ankles that allow it to climb up and down trees head-first, and also support jumping from tree to tree. Its classification has been controversial because its physical traits resemble those of cats, but is more closely related to the mongoose family, (Herpestidae) or most likely the family Malagasy carnivores family, (Eupleridae).
- The raccoon dog of Asia looks like the raccoon of North America (hence its scientific name Procyonoides) due to its black face mask, stocky build, bushy appearance, and ability to climb trees. Despite their similarities, it is actually classified as part of the dog family (Canidae).
- Gliders or passive flight has developed independently in flying squirrels, Australian marsupial, lizards, paradise tree snake, frogs, gliding ants and flying fish and the ancient volaticotherium that lived in the Jurassic Period looked like a flying squirrel, but is not an ancestor of squirrels.
- Amynodontidae, a family of extinct rhinoceroses that are thought to have looked and behaved like squat, aquatic, hippopotamuses.
- Trichromatic color vision, separate blue, green and red vision, is found only in a few mammals and came about independently in humans, Old World monkeys and the howler monkeys of the New World, and a few Australian marsupials.
- Ruminant forestomaches came about independently in: hoatzin bird and tree sloths of the Amazon, ruminant artiodactyls (deer, cattle), colobus monkeys of the Old World and some Macropodidae.
- Adept metabolic water, acquiring water by fat combustion in xerocole desert animal and others came about independently in: camel, kangaroo rat, migratory birds must rely exclusively on metabolic water production while making non-stop flights and more.
- Glyptodontidae, a family of extinct mammals related to armadillos, had a shell much like a tortoise or turtle. Pangolins have convergently evolved the same features.
- Megaladapis, a genus of extinct lemur, bears a great resemblance to an indri or a koala (hence its nickname "koala-lemur") due to their stocky bear-like build, short stumpy tail, and presumed tufted ears.
- Palaeopropithecidae, a family of extinct lemurs, which are most likely related to the family Indriidae due to their morphology, have many similarities to sloths due to their appearance and behaviour, such as long arms, hooked fingers, and slow moving, giving them the nickname "sloth-lemurs".
- Archaeolemuridae, another family of extinct lemurs, which are also most likely related to the family Indriidae, have many similarities to baboons and other monkeys due to their body plans, which are both adopted to arboreal and terrestrial lifestyle, giving them the nickname "monkey-lemurs" or "baboon-lemurs".
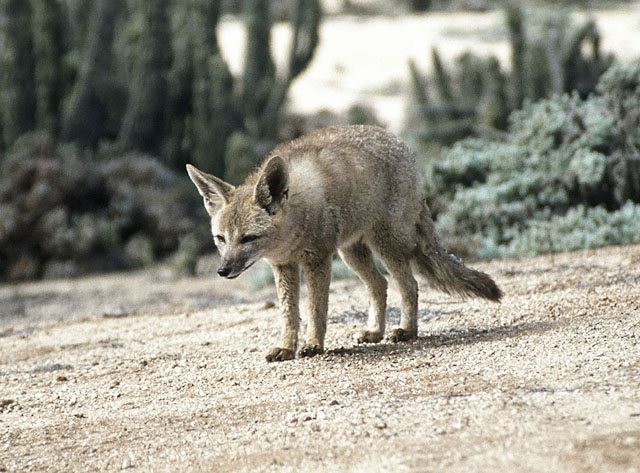
- South american foxes are not closely related to true foxes, they belong to a unique canid genus more closely related to wolves and jackals.
  South American foxes look like true foxes, despite being a unique canid genus more closely related to wolves and jackals.
- Whales exhibit hyperphalangy—an increase in the number of phalanges beyond three phalanges-per-digit. Whales share this characteristic with extinct marine reptiles, but not present-day marine mammals.
- A very derived form of hyperphalangy, with six or more phalanges per digit, evolved convergently in rorqual whales and oceanic dolphins, and was likely associated with another wave of signaling within the interdigital tissues.
- Palorchestes, a genus of the extinct marsupial family Palorchestidae, which are closely related to wombats and koalas in the suborder Vombatiformes, was nicknamed the "marsupial tapir" due to the shape of the animal's nasal bones, which was presumed that they possessed a short proboscis, like those of placental tapirs today.
- Mongooses bear a striking resemblance to many mustelids, but belong to a distinctly different suborder—the Feliformia (all those carnivores sharing more recent origins with the cats) and not the Caniformia (those sharing more recent origins with the dogs). Because mongooses and mustelids occupy similar ecological niches, they had led to similarity in form and behavior.
- Despite being from different families, both the giant panda (Ursidae) and the red panda (Ailuridae) are called "pandas" not only because of their fur pattern, but because they both have false thumbs and are adapted for a specialised bamboo diet despite having the digestive system of a carnivore (hence the order Carnivora).
- Multituberculates (named for the multiple tubercles on their "molars") are often called the "rodents of the Mesozoic", due to their appearances, traits and attributes.
- In general, marsupial cuscuses, brushtail possums, and their close relatives (Phalangeridae), are more terrestrial than other members of the suborder Phalangeriformes, and resemble terrestrial primates in some respects, especially lemurs of Madagascar, which are prosimians.
- Both the placental superorder Euarchontoglires and diprotodont marsupials are documented to possess a vermiform appendix.
- Thoatherium had a single hoof similar to one of an horse and was even described to a "pseudo-horse".

=== Prehistoric reptiles ===
- Pterosaurian pycnofibrils strongly resemble mammalian hair, but are thought to have evolved independently.
- Ornithischian (bird-hipped) dinosaurs had a pelvis shape similar to that of birds, or avian dinosaurs, which evolved from saurischian (lizard-hipped) dinosaurs.
- The Heterodontosauridae evolved a tibiotarsus which is also found in modern birds. These groups are not closely related.
- Ankylosaurs and glyptodont mammals both had spiked tails.
- The sauropods and giraffes independently evolved long necks.
- The horned snouts of ceratopsian dinosaurs like Triceratops have also evolved several times in Cenozoic mammals: rhinos, brontotheres, Arsinoitherium, and Uintatherium.
- Rhynchosaur teeth resemble that of the extant rodents.
- Billed snouts on the duck-billed dinosaurs hadrosaurs are strikingly convergent with ducks and the duck-billed platypus.
- Ichthyosaurs (such as Ophthalmosaurus) are marine reptile of the Mesozoic era which looked strikingly like dolphins. Several groups of marine reptiles evolved hyperphalangy similar to modern whales.
- Toothless beaks are independently derived in ornithomimosaurian, alvarezsaurian, therizinosaurian, oviraptorosaurian and ceratopsian dinosaurs like Triceratops, certain pterosaurs, birds, turtles, and cephalopods like squid, cuttlefish, and octopus.
- The "Pelycosauria" and the Ctenosauriscidae bore striking resemblance to each other because they both had a sail-like fin on their back. The pelycosaurs are synapsids (more closely related to mammals) while the ctenosauriscids are archosaurs (closely related to crocodilians, pterosaurs and dinosaurs). Also, the spinosaurids had sail-like fins on their backs, when they were not closely related to either.
  - Also, Acrocanthosaurus and Ouranosaurus, which are not closely related to either pelycosaurs, ctenosauriscids or spinosaurids, also had similar, but thicker, spines on their vertebrae.
- Noasaurus, Baryonyx, and Megaraptor, all unrelated, all had an enlarged hand claw that were originally thought to be placed on the foot, as in dromaeosaurs. A similarly modified claw (or in this case, finger) is on the hand of Iguanodon.
- The ornithopods had feet and beaks that resembled that of birds, but are only distantly related.
- Three groups of dinosaurs, the Tyrannosauridae, Ornithomimosauria, and the Troodontidae, all evolved an arctometatarsus, independently.
- Some placodonts (like Cyamodus, Psephoderma, Henodus and especially Placochelys) bear striking resemblance to sea turtles (and turtles in general) in terms of size, shell, beak, mostly toothless jaws, paddle-shaped limbs and possibly other adaptations for aquatic lifestyle.
- Herbivorous dinosaurs exhibited convergent evolution towards one of two feeding strategies, one strategy resembling mammalian herbivores (emphasizing chewing-specialized morphology, with the skull acquiring and processing food) and another strategy analogous to herbivory in birds and reptiles (emphasizing a specialized gut as in the avian gizzard, with the skull used only for acquiring rather than processing food).
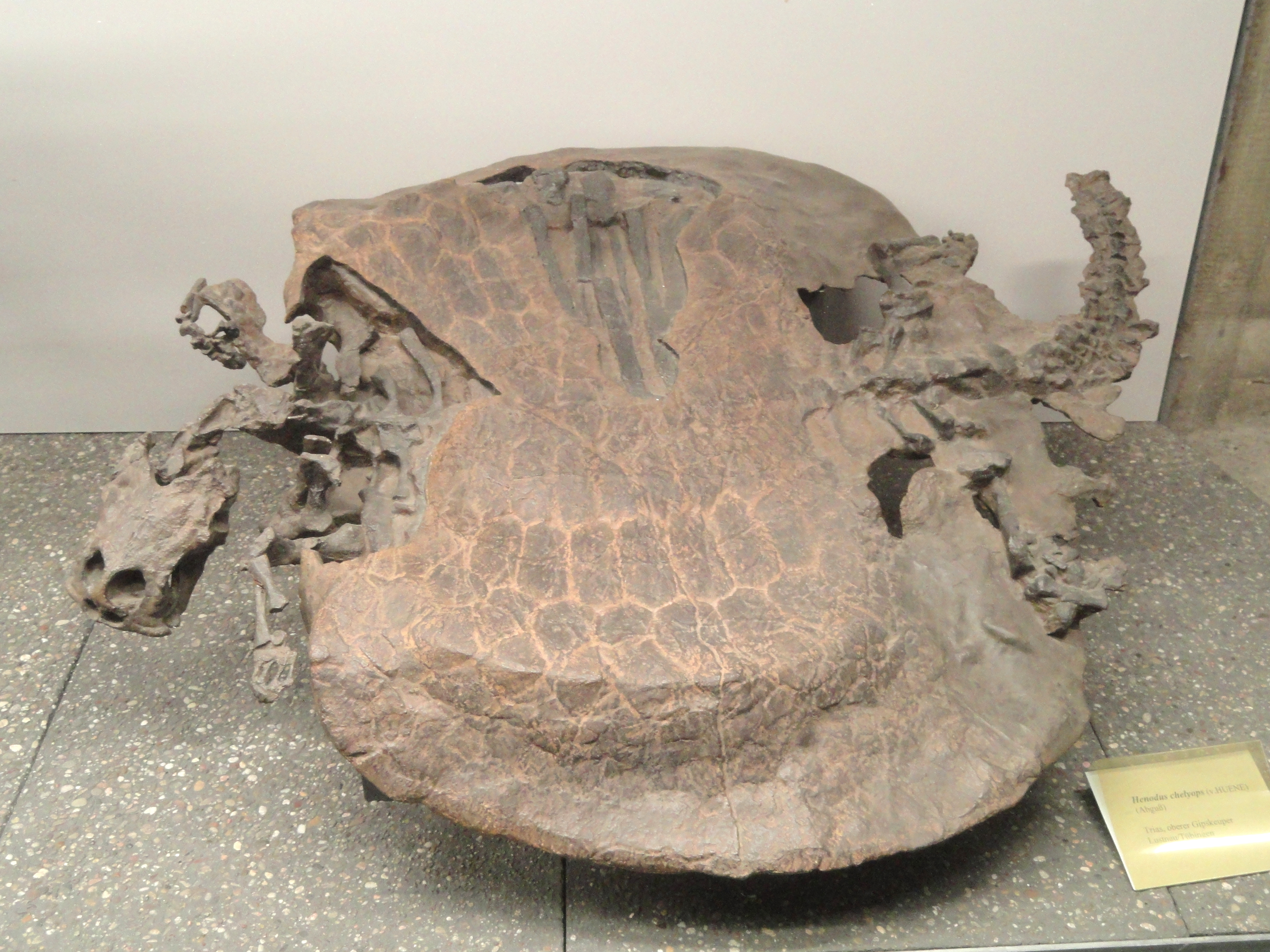
Henodus chelyops (Late Triassic), a placodont

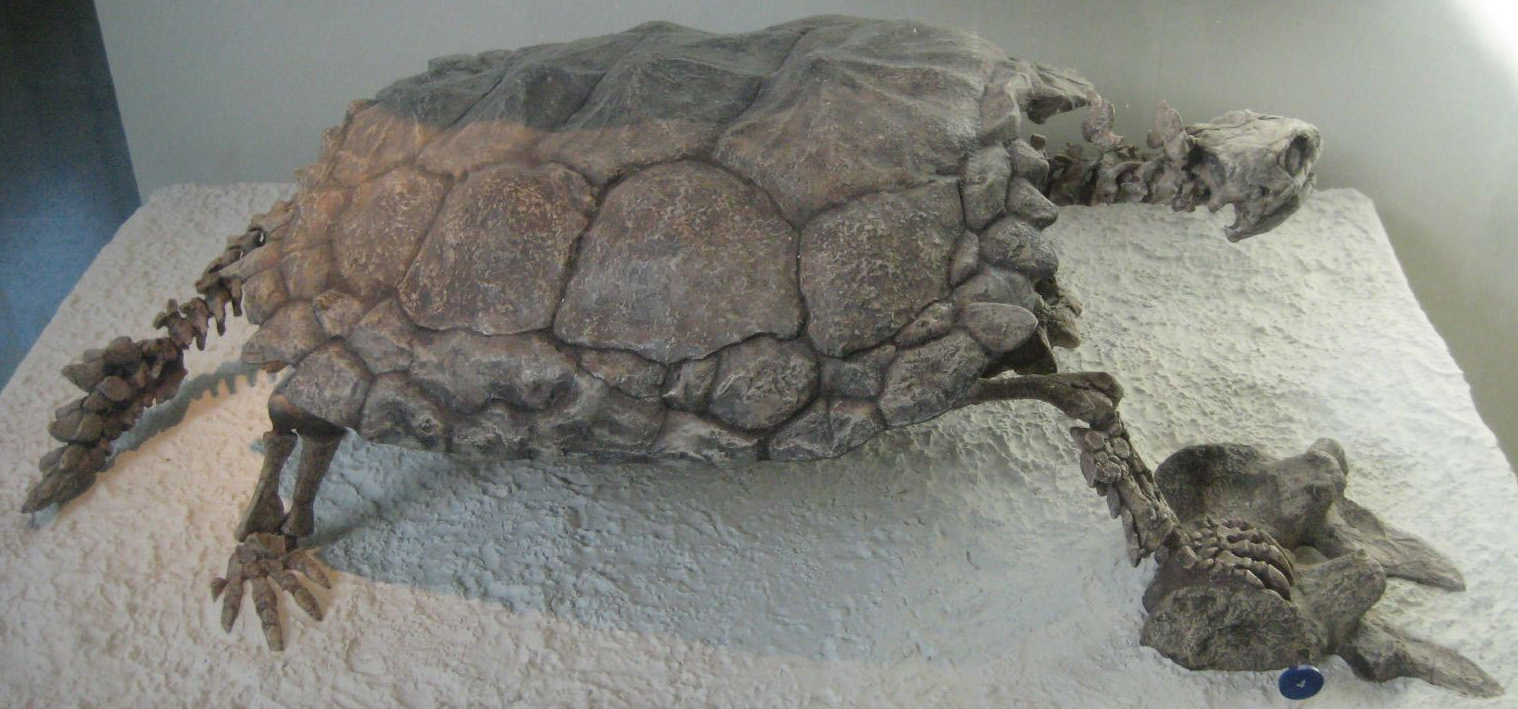
Proganochelys quenstedti (Late Triassic), a turtle

=== Extant reptiles ===
- The thorny devil (Moloch horridus) is similar in diet and activity patterns to the Texas horned lizard (Phrynosoma cornutum), although the two are not particularly closely related.
- Amphisbaenian skulls closely resemble those of caecilians and mammals.
- Modern crocodilians resemble prehistoric phytosaurs, champsosaurs, certain labyrinthodont amphibians, and perhaps even the early whale Ambulocetus. The resemblance between the crocodilians and phytosaurs in particular is quite striking; even to the point of having evolved the graduation between narrow- and broad-snouted forms, due to differences in diet between particular species in both groups.
- Death adders strongly resemble true vipers, but are elapids.
- Legless lizards evolved multiple times independently, including snakes, which are also legless lepidosaurs nested among legged lizards. Major examples of unrelated legless lizards include glass lizards (family Anguidae, related to legged alligator lizards) and flap-footed lizards (family Pygopodidae, related to geckos), which each may be mistaken for snakes.
- Large tegu lizards of South America have converged in form and ecology with monitor lizards, which are not present in the Americas.
- Anole lizards, with populations on isolated islands, are one of the best examples of both adaptive radiation and convergent evolution. Anoles on a given island evolve into multiple body types and ecological preferences, and the same set of body types appears in unrelated species across distant islands.
- The Asian sea snake Hydrophis schistosus (beaked sea snake) looks just like the Australian sea snake Hydrophis zweifeli, but in fact is not related.
- The emerald tree boa and the green tree python are from two different families (boas and pythons), yet are very similar in appearance and ecology.

=== Avian ===
- Cretaceous Hesperornithes were much like modern diving ducks, loons and grebes. Hesperornithes had the same lobed feet like grebes, with the hind legs very far back, that most likely they could not walk on land.
- The little auk of the north Atlantic (Charadriiformes) and the diving-petrels of the southern oceans (Procellariiformes) are remarkably similar in appearance and habits.
- The Eurasian magpie is a corvid while the Australian magpie is an artamid.
- Penguins in the Southern Hemisphere evolved similarly to flightless wing-propelled diving auks in the Northern Hemisphere: the Atlantic great auk and the Pacific mancallines.
- Vultures are a result of convergent evolution: both Old World vultures and New World vultures eat carrion, but Old World vultures are in the eagle and hawk family (Accipitridae) and use mainly eyesight for discovering food; the New World vultures are in a separate family, and some use the sense of smell as well as sight in hunting. Birds of both families are very big, search for food by soaring, circle over sighted carrion, flock in trees, and have unfeathered heads and necks.
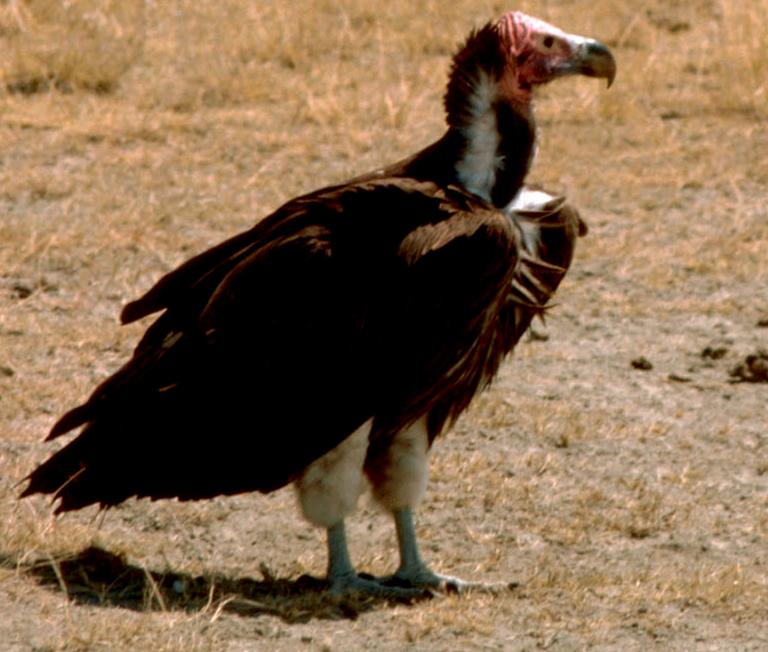
Nubian vulture, an Old World vulture

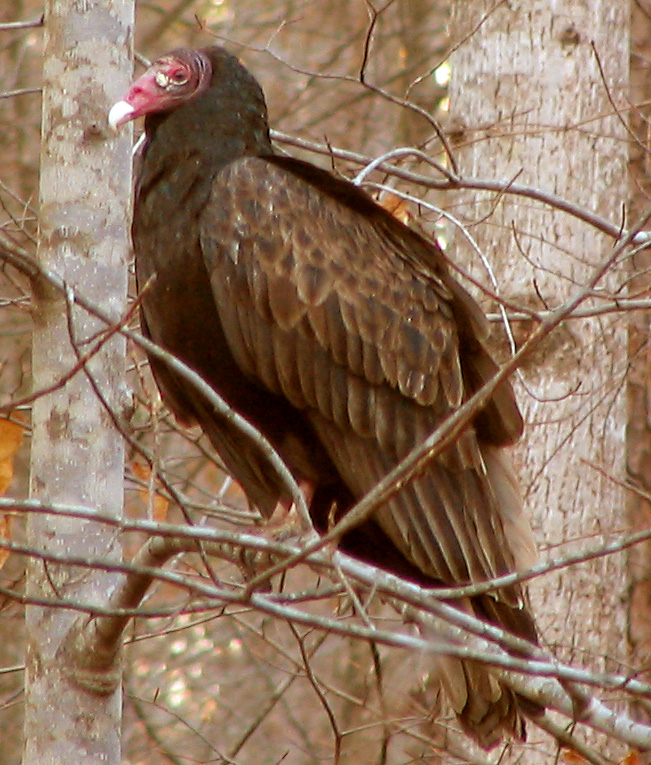
Turkey vulture, a New World vulture

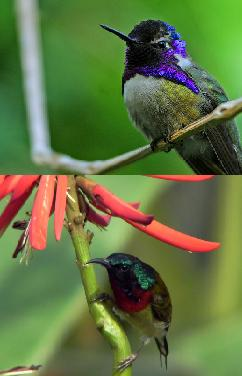
Hummingbird, a New World bird, with a sunbird, an Old World bird
- Hummingbirds resemble sunbirds. The former live in the Americas and belong to an order or superorder including the swifts, while the latter live in Africa and Asia and are a family in the order Passeriformes. Also the nectar-feeding Hawaiian honeycreepers resemble the two and differs from other honeycreeper.
- Flightlessness has evolved in many different birds independently. However, taking this to a greater extreme, the terror birds, Gastornithiformes and dromornithids (ironically all extinct) all evolved the similar body shape (flightlessness, long legs, long necks, big heads), yet none of them were closely related. They also share the trait of being giant, flightless birds with vestigial wings, long legs, and long necks with the ratites, although they are not related.
- Certain longclaws (Macronyx) and meadowlarks (Sturnella) have essentially the same striking plumage pattern. The former inhabit Africa and the latter the Americas, and they belong to different lineages of Passerida. While they are ecologically quite similar, no satisfying explanation exists for the convergent plumage; it is best explained by sheer chance.
- Resemblances between swifts and swallows is due to convergent evolution. The chimney swift was originally identified as chimney swallow (Hirundo pelagica) by Carl Linnaeus in 1758, before being moved to the swift genus Chaetura by James Francis Stephens in 1825.
- The downy woodpecker and hairy woodpecker look almost the same, as do some 'Chrysocolaptes and Dinopium flamebacks, the smoky-brown woodpecker and some Veniliornis species, and other Veniliornis species and certain "Picoides" and Piculus. In neither case are the similar species particularly close relatives.
- Many birds of Australia, like wrens and robins, look like Northern Hemisphere birds but are not related.
- Oilbirds like microbats and toothed whales developed sonar-like echolocation systems used for locating prey.
- The brain structure, forebrain, of hummingbirds, songbirds, and parrots responsible for vocal learning (not by instinct) is very similar. These types of birds are not closely related.
- Seriemas and secretary birds very closely resemble the ancient dromaeosaurid and troodontid dinosaurs. Both have evolved a retractable sickle-shaped claw on the second toe of each foot, both have feathers, and both are very similar in their overall physical appearance and lifestyle.
- Migrating birds like, Swainson's thrushes can have half the brain sleep with the other half awake. Dolphins, whales, Amazonian manatee and pinnipeds can do the same. Called unihemispheric slow-wave sleep.
- Brood parasitism, laying eggs in the nests of birds of other species, happens in types of birds that are not closely related.
- The charadriiform buttonquails closely resemble the galliform quails.
- Gallopheasants and junglefowl have similar tail-feathers but evolved them independently.
- Toucans and hornbills are very similar and occupy the same ecological niche, but are not closely related. Toucans live in the Americas and belong to the order Piciformes. Hornbills live in Africa, Asia and Melanesia and belong to the order Bucerotiformes.

=== Fish ===
- Aquatic animals that swim by using an elongated fin along the dorsum, ventrum, or in pairs on their lateral margins (such as oarfish, knifefish, cephalopods) have all come to the same ratio of amplitude to wavelength of fin undulation to maximize speed, 20:1.
- Mudskippers and exhibit a number of adaptations to semi-terrestrial lifestyle which are also usually attributed to Devonian tetrapodomorphs such as Tiktaalik: breathing surface air, having eyes positioned on top of the head, propping up and moving on land using strong fins. Pacific leaping blennies also resemble mudskippers though they are not related.
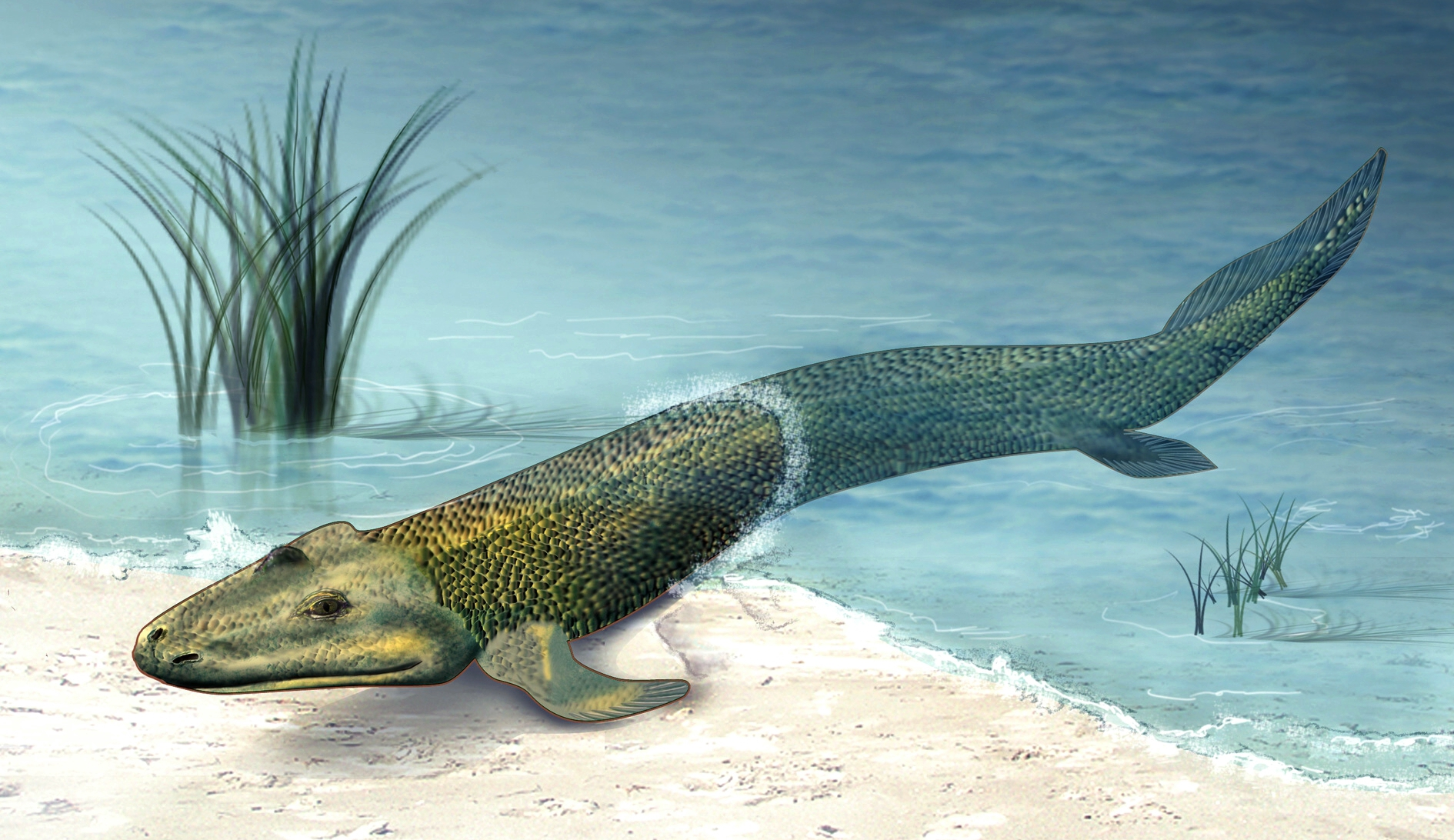
Tiktaalik roseae - artistic interpretation. Neil Shubin, suggests the animal could prop up on its fins to venture onto land, though many palaeonthologists reject this idea as outdated

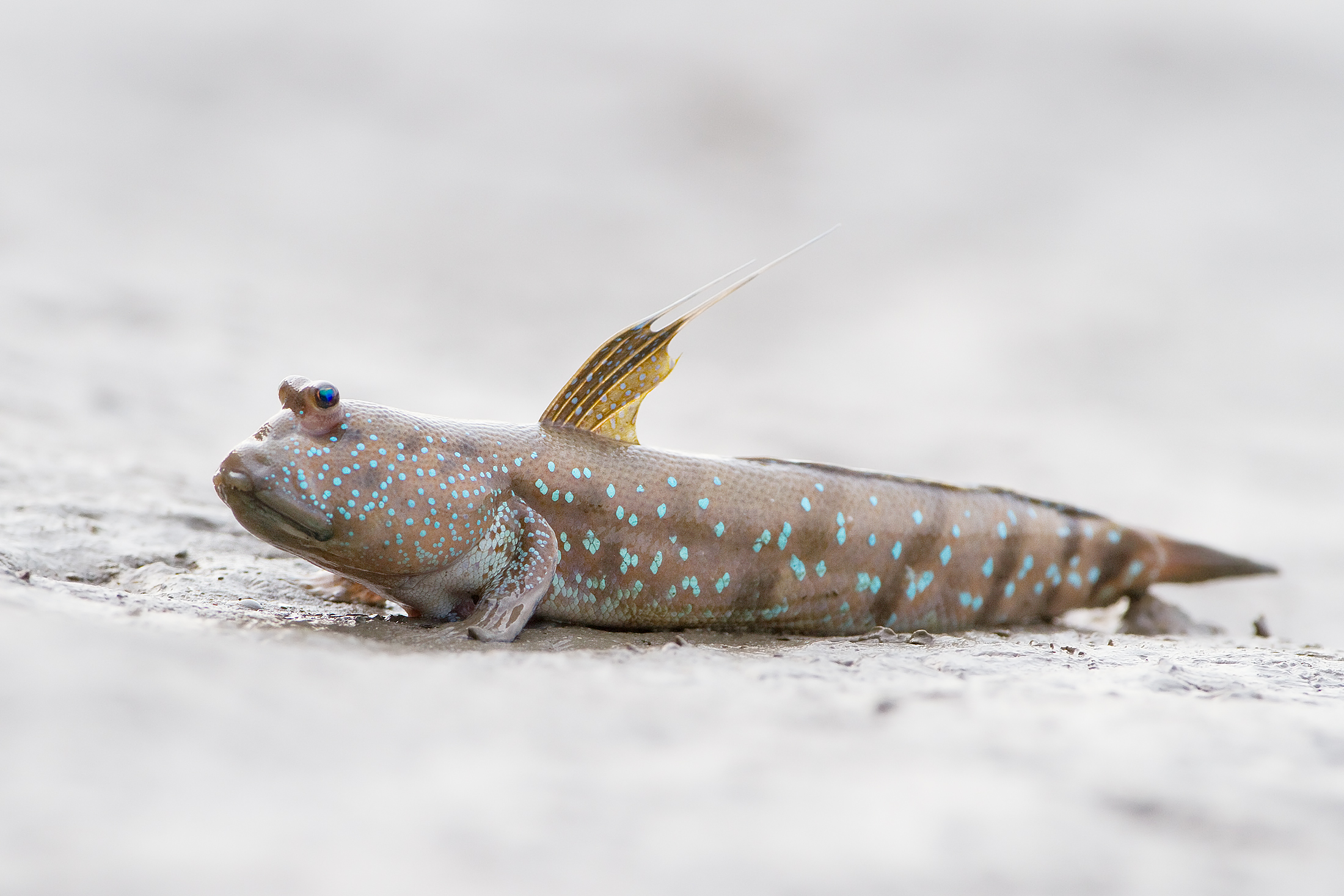
Boleophthalmus boddarti - a mudskipper which is believed to share some features with extinct fishapods in terms of adaptations to terrestrial habitats

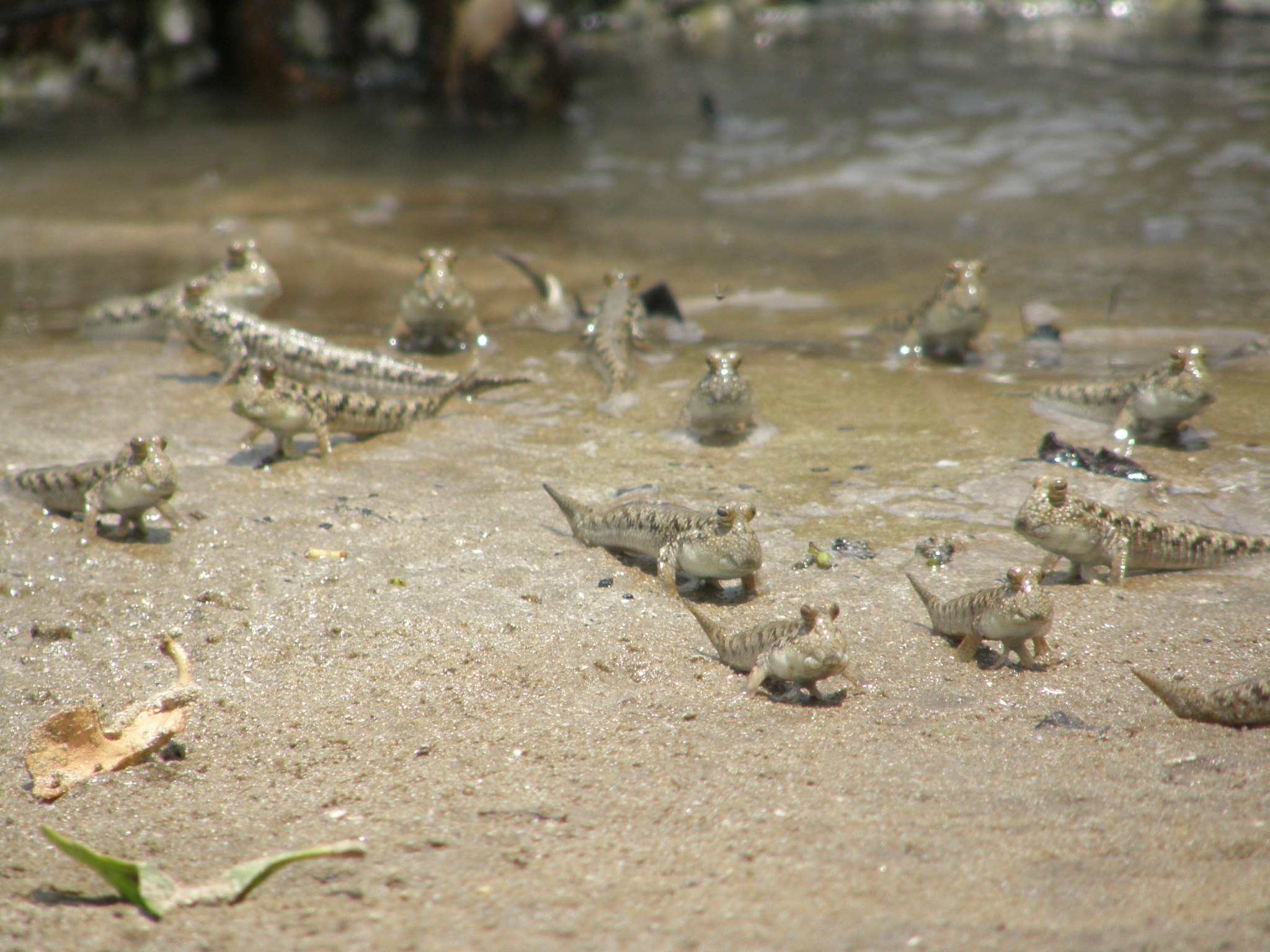
A group of mudskippers coming ashore - they use pectoral fins to prop up and move on land. Some scientists believe Tiktaalik to have acted likewise
- Gobies are dorsal finned like the lumpsuckers, yet they are not related.
- The Rhenanids became extinct over 200 million years before the first stingrays evolved, yet they share quite a similar appearance.
- Sandlance fish and chameleons have independent eye movements and focusing by use of the cornea.
- Acanthurids and mbuna are both aggressive, brightly colored fish that feed principally on aufwuchs, although the former is found only in marine environments, while the latter is only found in freshwater Lake Malawi.
- Cichlids of South America and the "sunfish" of North America are strikingly similar in morphology, ecology and behavior.
- The peacock bass and largemouth bass are excellent examples. The two fishes are not related, yet are very similar. Peacock bass are native of South America and is a Cichla. While largemouth bass are native to Southern USA states and is a sunfish. others will surely be described (but see the results based on DNA data).
- The antifreeze protein of fish in the Arctic and Antarctic, came about independently. AFGPs evolved separately in notothenioids and northern cod. In notothenioids, the AFGP gene arose from an ancestral trypsinogen-like serine protease gene.
- Electric fish: electric organs and electrosensory systems evolved independently in South American Gymnotiformes and African Mormyridae.
- Eel form are independent in the North American brook lamprey, neotropical eels, and the African spiny eel.
- Stickleback fish have repeatedly moved between marine and freshwater environments, with widespread convergent evolution to adapt and readapt to these environments in different species.
- Flying fish can fly up to 400 m (1,300 ft) at speeds of more than 70 kilometres per hour (43 mph) at a maximum altitude of more than 6 m (20 ft), much like other flying birds, bats and other gliders.
- Extinct fish of the family Thoracopteridae, like Thoracopterus or Potanichthys, were similar to modern flying fish (gliding ability thanks to enlarged pair of pectoral fins and a deeply forked tail fin) which is not, however, considered to be their descendant.
- The cleaner wrasse Labroides dimidiatus of the Indian Ocean is a small, longitudinally-striped black and bright blue cleaner fish, just like the cleaner goby Elacatinus evelynae of the western Atlantic.
- The fish of the now discredited genus Stylophthalmus are only distantly related, but their larvae (Stomiiformes and Myctophiformes) have developed similar, stalked eyes. (see: Stylophthalmine trait)
- Sawfish (a group of rays related to guitarfish), unrelated sawsharks (a group of sharks), and the extinct sawskates (another group of rays related to modern skates) all convergently evolved a saw-like rostrum with sharp transverse teeth for hunting. This evolutionary process has been named "pristification".
- Underwater camouflage is found independently in many fish like: leafy seadragon (large part of its body is just for camouflage), pygmy seahorse, leaf scorpionfish, flounder, peacock flounder. Some have active camouflage that changes with need.
- Distraction eye, many fish have spot on the tail to fool potential predators and prey; both are not sure which is the front, the direction of travel.
- Gills appear in unrelated fish, some amphibians, some crustacean, aquatic insects and some mollusk, like freshwater snails, squid, octopus.
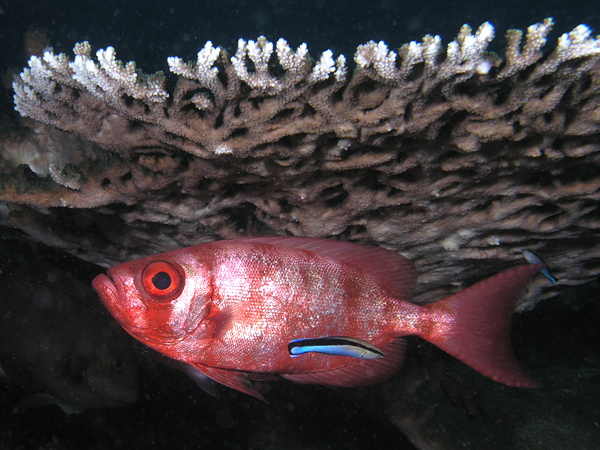
Cleaner wrasse Labroides dimidiatus servicing a Bigeye squirrelfish

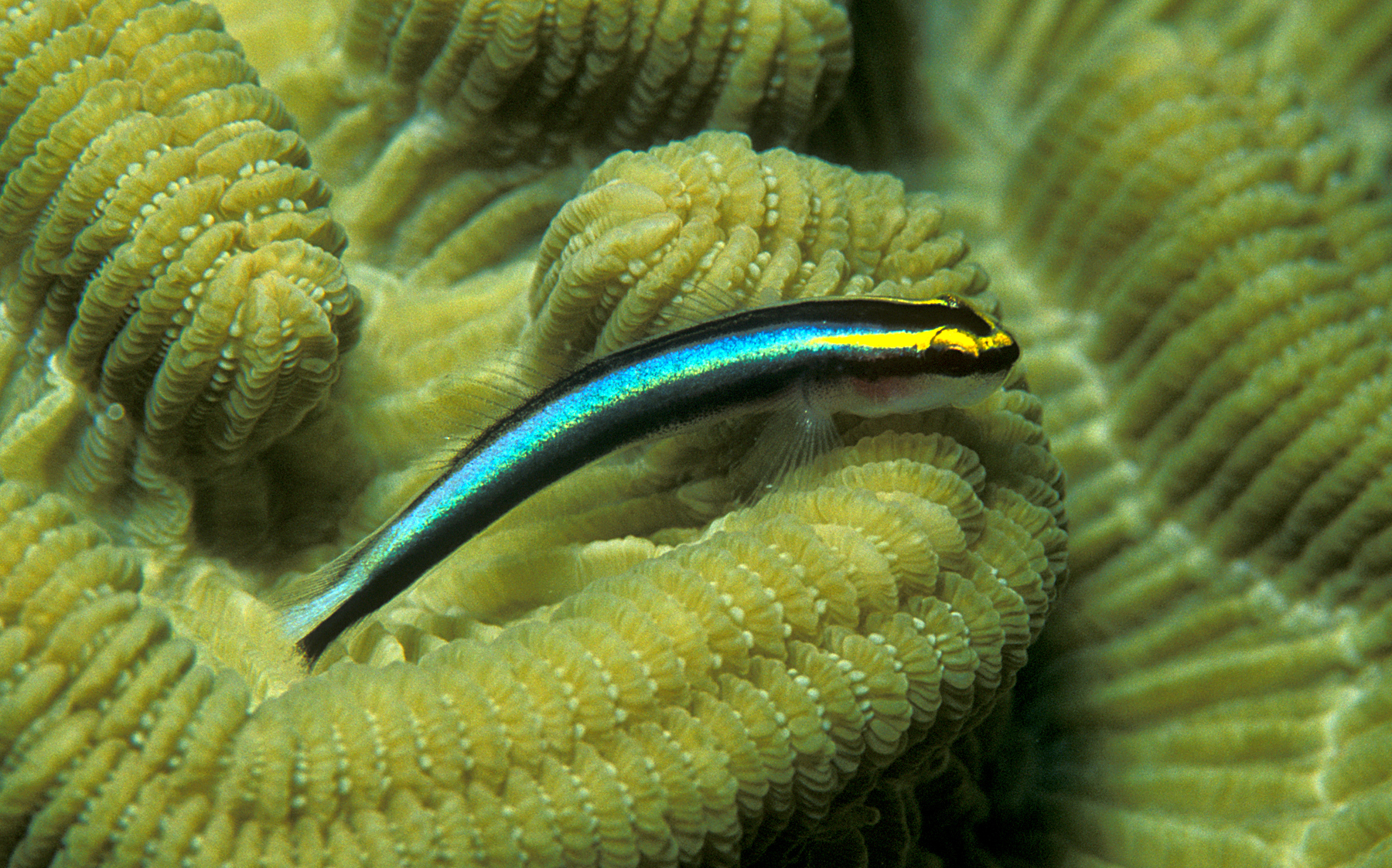
Caribbean cleaning goby Elacatinus evelynae

=== Amphibians ===
- Plethodontid salamanders and chameleons have evolved a harpoon-like tongue to catch insects.
- The Neotropical poison dart frog and the Mantella of Madagascar have independently developed similar mechanisms for obtaining alkaloids from a diet of mites and storing the toxic chemicals in skin glands. They have also independently evolved similar bright skin colors that warn predators of their toxicity (by the opposite of crypsis, namely aposematism).
- Caecilians are lissamphibians that secondarily lost their limbs, superficially resembling snakes and legless lizards.
- Oldest known tetrapods (semi-aquatic Ichthyostegalia) resembled giant salamanders (body plan, lifestyle), though they are considered to be only distantly related.
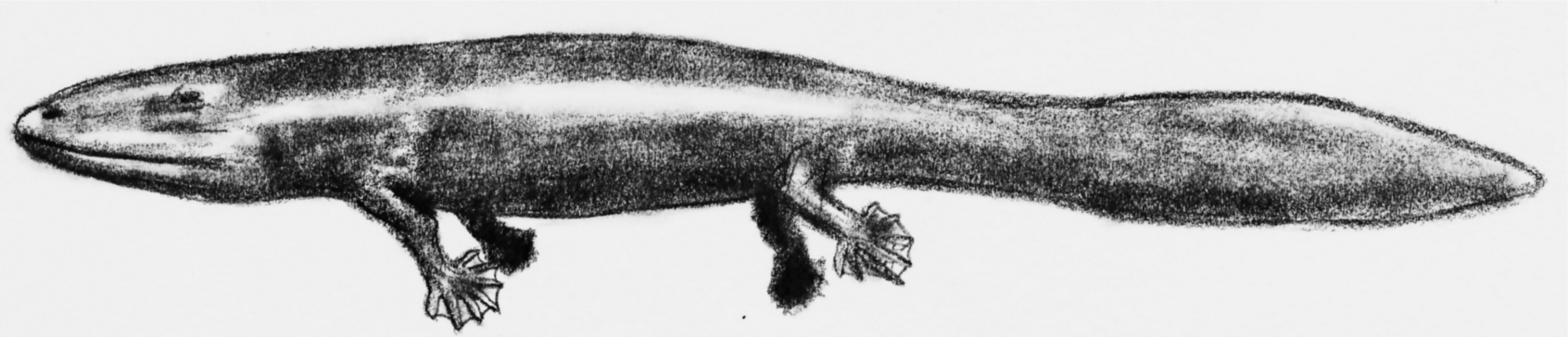
Elginerpeton pacheni, the oldest known tetrapod

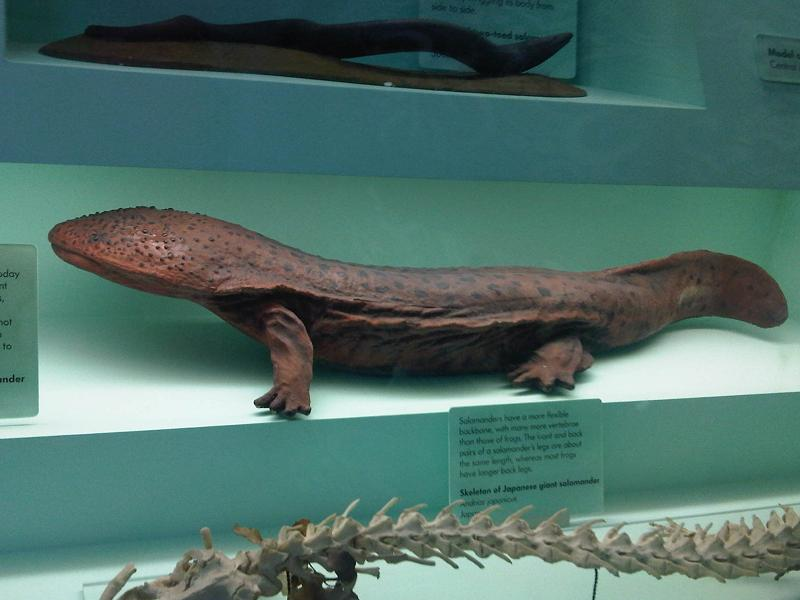
Andrias japonicus, a giant salamander which resembles first tetrapods
- Many different amphibians are neotenic, evolved to retain larval traits (such as external gills) as part of an aquatic lifestyle. For example, Ambystoma mexicanum, an extant salamander, is difficult to tell apart from the Permian temnospondyl Branchiosaurus.
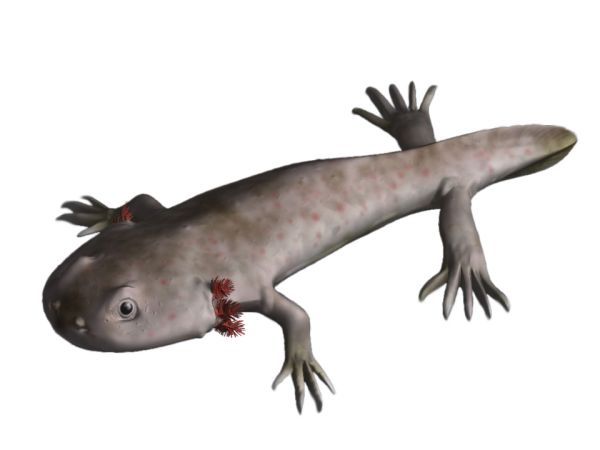
Branchiosaurus, a Permian genus

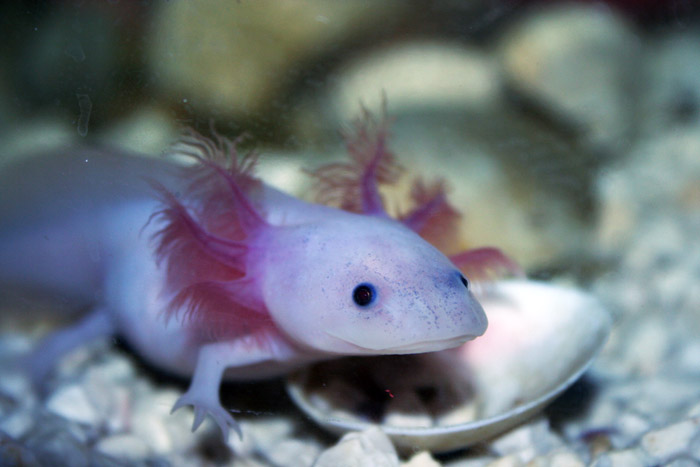
Mexican salamander (axolotl), extant

=== Arthropods ===
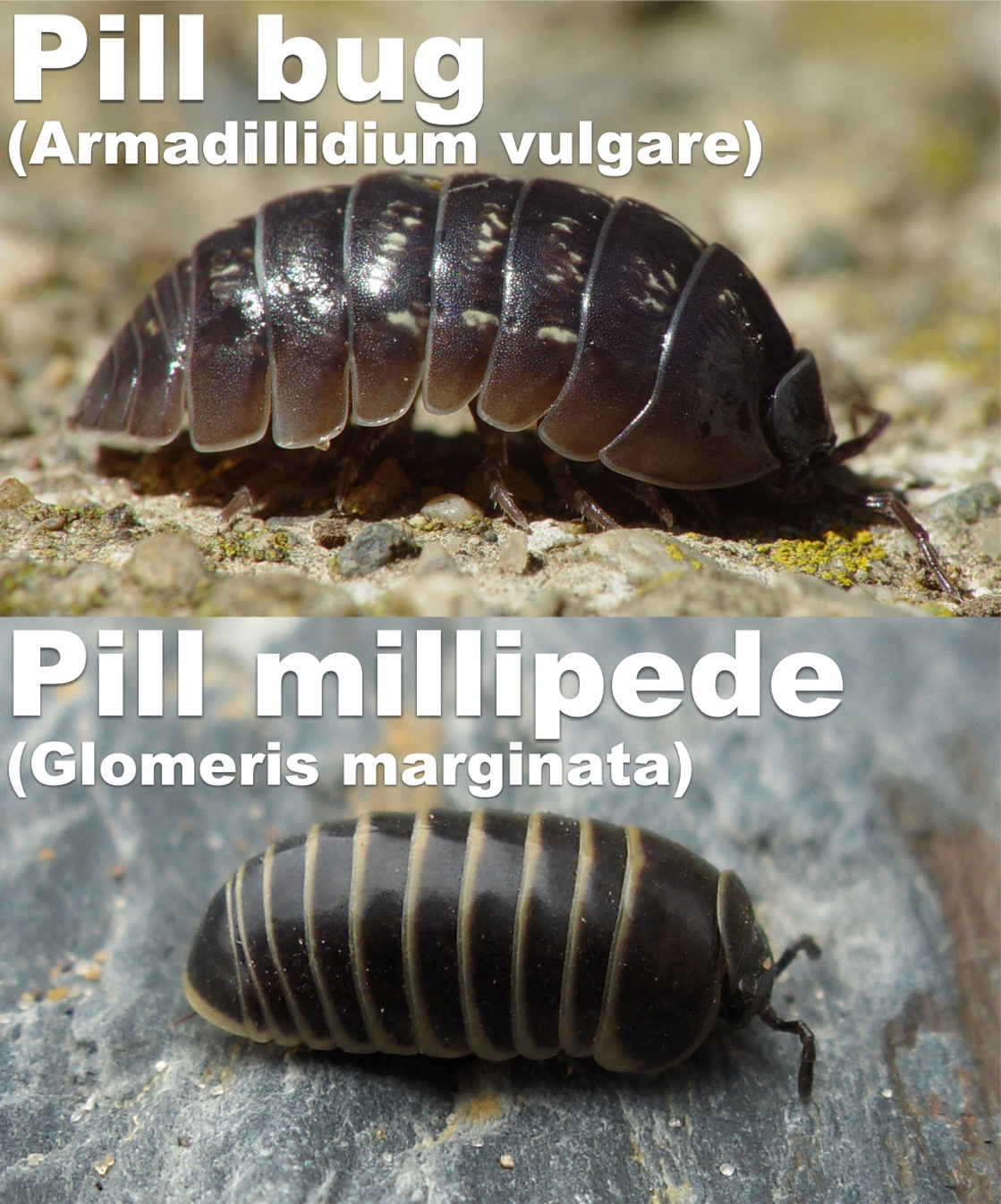
Pill bugs look like pill millipedes, but are actually wood lice that have converged on the same defenses, until they are difficult to tell apart

- The smelling organs of the terrestrial coconut crab are similar to those of insects.
- In an odd cross-phyla example, an insect, the hummingbird hawk-moth (Macroglossum stellatarum), also feeds by hovering in front of flowers and drinking their nectar in the same way as hummingbirds and sunbirds.
- Pill bugs and pill millipedes have evolved near-identical defensive plates, even being difficult to tell apart at a glance. The giant isopod also provides a large, deep-sea equivalent.
- Silk: spiders, silk moths, larval caddis flies, and the weaver ant all produce silken threads.
- The praying mantis body type – raptorial forelimb, prehensile neck, and extraordinary snatching speed - has evolved not only in mantises but also independently in neuropteran insects Mantispidae.
- Gripping limb ends have evolved separately in scorpions and in some decapod crustaceans, like lobsters and crabs. These chelae or claws have a similar architecture: the next-to-last segment grows a projection that fits against the last segment.
- Agriculture: some kinds of ants, termites, and ambrosia beetles have for a long time cultivated and tend fungi for food. These insects sow, fertilize, and weed their crops. A damselfish also takes care of red algae carpets on its piece of reef; the damselfish actively weeds out invading species of algae by nipping out the newcomer.
- Slave-making behavior has evolved several times independently in the ant subfamilies Myrmicinae and Formicinae, and more than ten times in total in ants.
- Proleg: a fleshy leg on many larvae of insects has independently evolved in several orders.
- Parasitoid use of viruses: parasitoid wasps lay their eggs inside host caterpillars; to keep the caterpillar's immune system from killing the egg, a virus is also "laid" with the eggs. Two unrelated wasps use this trick.
- Short-lived breeders: species that are in the juvenile phase for most of their lives. The adult lives are so short most do not have working mouth parts. Unrelated species: cicada, mayflies, some flies, dragonfly, silk moths, and some other moths.
- Katydids and frogs both make loud sounds with a sound-producing organs to attract females for mating.
- Camouflage of two kinds: twig-like camouflage independently in walking sticks and the larvae of some butterflies and moths; leaf camouflage is found independently in some praying mantises and winged moths.
- Dipteran flies and Strepsiptera insects independently came up with whirling drumsticks halteres that are used like gyroscopes in flight.
- Carcinisation: a crustacean evolves into a crab-like form from a non-crab-like form. The term was introduced into evolutionary biology by L. A. Borradaile, who described it as "one of the many attempts of Nature to evolve a crab".

=== Molluscs ===
In vertebrate eyes, the nerve fibers route before the retina, blocking some light and creating a blind spot where the fibers pass through the retina and out of the eye. In octopus eyes, the nerve fibers route behind the retina, and do not block light or disrupt the retina. In the example, 4 denotes the vertebrate blind spot, which is notably absent in the octopus eye. In both images, 1 denotes the retina and 2 the nerve fibers, including the optic nerve (3).
- Bivalves and the gastropods in the family Juliidae have very similar shells.
- There are limpet-like forms in several lines of gastropods: "true" limpets, pulmonate siphonariid limpets and several lineages of pulmonate freshwater limpets.
- Cephalopod (like in octopuses and squid) and vertebrate eyes are both lens-camera eyes with much overall similarity, yet are very unrelated species. A closer examination reveals some differences including embryonic development, extraocular muscles, number of lens parts, and the lack of a retinal blindspot in the cephalopod eye.
- Swim bladders: buoyant bladders independently evolved in fishes, the tuberculate pelagic octopus, and siphonophores such as the Portuguese man o' war.
- Bivalves and brachiopods independently evolved paired hinged shells for protection. However, the anatomy of their soft parts is very dissimilar, which is why molluscs and brachiopods are put into different phyla.
- Jet propulsion in squids and in scallops: these two groups of mollusks have very different ways of squeezing water through their bodies in order to power rapid movement through a fluid. (Dragonfly larvae in the aquatic stage also use an anal jet to propel them, and jellyfish have used jet propulsion for a very long time.) Sea hares (gastropod molluscs) employ a similar means of jet propulsion, but without the sophisticated neurological machinery of cephalopods they navigate somewhat more clumsily. Tunicates (such as salps), and some jellyfish also employ jet propulsion. The most efficient jet-propelled organisms are the salps, which use an order of magnitude less energy (per kilogram per metre) than squid.
- The free-swimming sea slug Phylliroe is notable for being a pelagic hunter that resembles a fish in body plan and locomotion, with functional convergences.

=== Other ===
- The notochords in chordates are like the stomochords in hemichordates.
- Gastrotrichs, despite being in two different superphyla, resemble the kinorhynchids.
- Elvis taxa in the fossil record developed a similar morphology through convergent evolution.
- Venomous sting: to inject poison with a hypodermic needle, a sharp pointed tube, has shown up independently 10+ times: jellyfish, spiders, scorpions, centipedes, various insects, cone shell, snakes, some catfish, stingrays, stonefish, the male duckbill platypus, Siphonophorae and stinging nettles plant.
- Bioluminescence: symbiotic partnerships with light-emitting bacteria developed many times independently in deep-sea fish, jellyfish, fireflies, Rhagophthalmidae, Pyrophorus beetles, pyrosome, Mycena, Omphalotus nidiformis mushrooms, Vargula hilgendorfii, Quantula striata snail, googly-eyed glass squid, stiptic fungus, Noctiluca scintillans, Pyrocystis fusiformis, vargulin, sea pen, ostracod, Siphonophorae and glow worms. Bioluminescence is also produced by some animals directly.
- Parthenogenesis: Some lizards and insects have independent the capacity for females to produce live young from unfertilized eggs. Some species are entirely female.
- Several worm phyla have evolved an eversible proboscis, with examples being acanthocephalans, priapulids, kinorhynchs, and some polychaete worms.
- Extremely halophile archaeal family Halobacteriaceae and the extremely halophilic bacterium Salinibacter ruber both can live in high salt environment.
- Jellyfish-form hydrozoans have evolved many times, including the Portuguese man-o' war, and the crystal jelly.
- In the evolution of sexual reproduction and origin of the sex chromosome: mammals, females have two copies of the X chromosome (XX) and males have one copy of the X and one copy of the Y chromosome (XY). In birds it is the opposite, with males have two copies of the Z chromosome (ZZ) and females have one copy of the Z and one copy of the W chromosome (ZW).
- Multicellular organisms arose independently in brown algae (seaweed and kelp), plants, animals, and fungi.
- Origins of teeth have happened at least two times.
- Winged flight is found in unrelated species: birds, bats (mammal), insects, pterosaur and Pterodactylus (reptiles). Flying fish do not fly, but are very good at gliding flight.
- Hummingbird, dragonfly and hummingbird hawk-moth can hover and fly backwards.
- Neuroglobins are found in vertebrate neurons, (deuterostomes), and are found in the neurons of unrelated protostomes, like photosynthesis acoel and jelly fish.
- Siphonophorae and Praya dubia resemble and act like jellyfish, but are Hydrozoa, a colony of specialized minute individuals called zooids. Salp, a chordate, also is very much like jellyfish, yet completely different.
- Eusociality colonies in which only one female (queen) is reproductive and all other are divided into a castes system, all work together in a coordinate system. This system is used in many unrelated animals: ants, bees, and wasps, termites, naked mole-rat, Damaraland mole-rat, Synalpheus regalis shrimp, certain beetles, some gall thrips and some aphids.
- Oxygenate blood came about in unrelated animals groups: vertebrates use iron (hemoglobin) and crustaceans and many mollusks use copper (hemocyanin).
- Biomineralization the secrete protective shells or carapaces made out of organically made hard materials like mineral carbonates and organic chitins came about in unrelated species all at the same time during the cambrian Explosion in: mollusks, brachiopods, arthropods, bryozoans, echinoderms, tube worms. (Note: Biomineralization is a process generally concomitant to biodegradation.)
- Reef builders, a number of unrelated species of sea life build rocky like reefs: some types of bacteria make stromatolites, various sponges build skeletons of calcium carbonate, like: archaeocyath sponges, and stromatoporoid sponges, corals, some anthozoan cnidarians, bryozoans, calcareous algae and some bivalves (rudist bivalves).
- Magnetite for orientation, magnetically charged particles of magnetite for directional sensing have been found in unrelated species of salmon, rainbow trout, some butterflies and birds.
- Hydrothermal vent adaptations like the use of bacteria housed in body flesh or in special organs, to the point they no longer have mouth parts, have been found in unrelated hydrothermal vent species of mollusks and tube worms (like the giant tube worm).
- Lichens are partnerships of fungi and algae. Each "species" of lichen is make of different fungi and algae species, thus each has to come about independently.
- Parental care came about independently in: mammals, most birds, some insects, some fish and crocodilians.
- Regeneration, many different unrelated species can grow new limbs, tail or other body parts, if body parts are lost.
- The statocyst is a balance sensory receptor independently found in different organisms like: some aquatic invertebrates, including bivalves, cnidarians, echinoderms, cephalopods, and crustaceans. Also found in single-cell ciliate. A similar structure is also found in Xenoturbella.
- Hearing came about in many different unrelated species with the: tympanal organ, Johnston's organ and mammal/bird ears. Also the simpler hearing found in reptiles, with only the stapes bone.
- Pincushion-form starfish have evolved at least four times.
- Infrared vision is in many different unrelated species: pit viper snakes (rattlesnakes), pythons, vampire bats, and wood-boring wasps and fire beetles.

== In plants ==
- While most plant species are perennial, about 6% follow an annual life cycle, living for only one growing season. The annual life cycle has evolved in over 120 plant families across the entire angiosperm phylogeny. Notably, the prevalence of annual species increases under hot-dry summer conditions in different families including Asteraceae, Brassicaceae, Fabaceae, and Poaceae.
- Leaves have evolved multiple times - see Evolutionary history of plants. They have evolved not only in land plants, but also in various algae, like kelp.
- Prickles, thorns and spines are all modified plant tissues that have evolved to prevent or limit herbivory, these structures have evolved independently a number of times.
- Stimulant toxins: plants which are only distantly related to each other, such as coffee, tea, kola and yerba mate produce caffeine to deter predators.
- The aerial rootlets found in ivy (Hedera) are similar to those of the climbing hydrangea (Hydrangea petiolaris) and some other vines. These rootlets are not derived from a common ancestor but have the same function of clinging to whatever support is available.
- Flowering plants (Delphinium, Aerangis, Tropaeolum and others) from different regions form tube-like spurs that contain nectar. This is why insects from one place sometimes can feed on plants from another place that have a structure like the flower, which is the traditional source of food for the animal.
- Casuarinas are flowering plants with fruit and leaves resembling the leaves and cones of the gymnosperm pines
- Some dicots (Anemone) and monocots (Trillium) in inhospitable environments are able to form underground organs such as corms, bulbs and rhizomes for reserving of nutrition and water until the conditions become better.
- Carnivorous plants: nitrogen-deficient plants have in at least seven distinct times become carnivorous, like: flypaper traps such as sundews and butterworts, spring traps-Venus fly trap, and pitcher traps in order to capture and digest insects to obtain scarce nitrogen.
- Pitcher plants: the pitcher trap evolved independently in three eudicot lineages and one monocot lineage.
- Similar-looking rosette succulents have arisen separately among plants in the families Asphodelaceae (formerly Liliaceae) and Crassulaceae.
- The orchids, the birthwort family and Stylidiaceae have evolved independently the specific organ known as gynostemium, more popular as column.
- The Euphorbia of deserts in Africa and southern Asia, and the Cactaceae of the New World deserts have similar modifications (see picture below for one of many possible examples).
- Sunflower: some types of sunflower and Pericallis are due to convergent evolution.
- Crassulacean acid metabolism (CAM), a carbon fixation pathway that evolved in multiple plants as an adaptation to arid conditions.
- C4 photosynthesis is estimated to have evolved over 60 times within plants, via multiple different sequences of evolutionary events. C4 plants use a different metabolic pathway to capture carbon dioxide but also have differences in leaf anatomy and cell biology compared to most other plants.
- Trunk, a single woody stem came about in unrelated plants: paleozoic tree forms of club mosses, horsetails, and seed plants.
- The marine animals sea lily crinoid, looks like a terrestrial palm tree.
- Palm trees form are in unrelated plants: cycads (from the Jurassic period) and older tree ferns.
- Flower petals came about independently in a number of different plant lineages.
- Bilateral flowers, with distinct up-down orientation, came about independently in a number of different plants like: violets, orchids and peas.
- United petals, petals that unite into a single bell shape came about independently in blueberries, Ericaceae and other plants.
- Hummingbird flowers are scentless tubular flowers that have independently came about in at least four plant families. They attract nectar-feeding birds like: hummingbirds, honey eaters, sunbirds. Remote Hawaii also has hummingbird flowers.
- Carrion flower type flowers that smell like rotting meat have independently came about in: pawpaw (family Annonaceae), the giant Indonesian parasitic flower Rafflesia, and African milkweed (Stapelia gigantea).
- Fruit that develops underground, after the upper part is pollinated the flower stalk elongates, arches downward and pushes into the ground, this has independently came about in: peanut, legume, Florida's endangered burrowing four o'clock and Africa's Cucumis humifructus.
- Plant fruit: the fleshy nutritious part of plants that animal dispense by eating independently came about in flowering plants and in some gymnosperms like: ginkgo and cycads.
- Water transport systems, like vascular plant systems, with water conducting vessels, independently came about in horsetails, club mosses, ferns, and gymnosperms.
- Wind pollination independently came about in pine trees, grasses, and wind pollinated flower.
- Wind dispersal of seeds independently came about in dandelions, milkweed, cottonwood trees, and others tufted seeds like, Impatiens sivarajanii, all adapted for wind dispersal.
- Hallucinogenic toxins independently came about in: peyotecactus, Ayahuasca vine, some fungi like psilocybin mushroom.
- Plant toxins independently came about in: solauricine, daphnin, tinyatoxin, ledol, protoanemonin, lotaustralin, chaconine, persin and more.
- Venus flytrap sea anemone is an animal and the Venus flytrap is a plant. Both look and act the same.
- Digestive enzymes independently came about in carnivorous plants and animals.
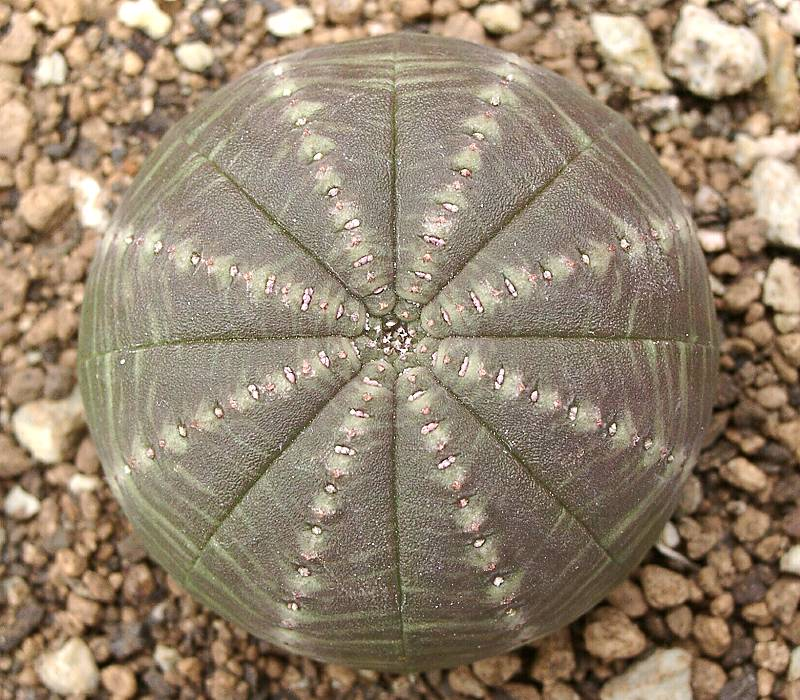
Euphorbia obesa

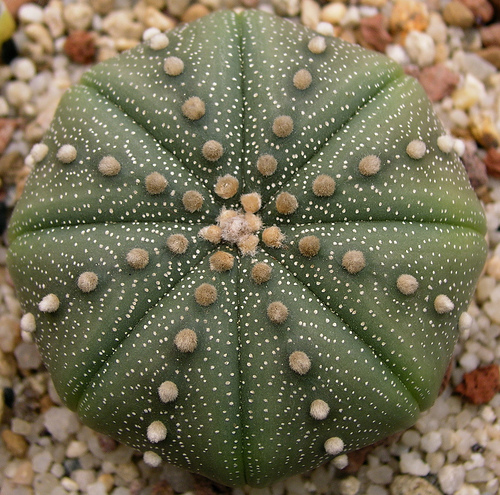
Astrophytum asterias

== In fungi ==
- There are a variety of saprophytic and parasitic organisms that have evolved the habit of growing into their substrates as thin strands for extracellular digestion. This is most typical of the "true" fungi, but it has also evolved in Actinomycetota (Bacteria), oomycetes (which are part of the stramenopile grouping, as are kelp), parasitic plants, and rhizocephalans (parasitic barnacles).
- Slime molds are traditionally classified as fungi, but molecular-phylogeny work has revealed that most slime molds are not very close to Fungi proper and similar organisms, and that their slime-mold habit has originated several times. Mycetozoa (Amoebozoa), Labyrinthulomycetes (Stramenopiles), Phytomyxea and Guttulinopsis vulgaris (Rhizaria), Acrasidae (Heterolobosea), Fonticula alba (Opisthokonta), and Myxobacteria (Bacteria). Mycetozoa itself contains myxogastrids, dictyostelids, and protostelids, likely with separate origins, with protostelids themselves likely originating several times.
- Specialized forms of osmotrophy are found in unrelated fungi and animals.

== In proteins, enzymes and biochemical pathways ==
=== Functional convergence ===
Evolutionary convergence of serine and cysteine protease towards the same catalytic triads organisation of acid-base-nucleophile in different protease superfamilies. Shown are the triads of subtilisin, prolyl oligopeptidase, TEV protease, and papain.

Evolutionary convergence of threonine proteases towards the same N-terminal active site organisation. Shown are the catalytic threonine of the proteasome and ornithine acetyltransferase.

Here is a list of examples in which unrelated proteins have similar functions with different structure.

- The convergent orientation of the catalytic triad in the active site of serine and cysteine proteases independently in over 20 enzyme superfamilies.
- The use of an N-terminal threonine for proteolysis.
- The existence of distinct families of carbonic anhydrase is believed to illustrate convergent evolution.
- The use of (Z)-7-dodecen-1-yl acetate as a sex pheromone by the Asian elephant (Elephas maximus) and by more than 100 species of Lepidoptera.
- The biosynthesis of plant hormones such as gibberellin and abscisic acid by different biochemical pathways in plants and fungi.
- The protein prestin that drives the cochlea amplifier and confers high auditory sensitivity in mammals, shows numerous convergent amino acid replacements in bats and dolphins, both of which have independently evolved high frequency hearing for echolocation. This same signature of convergence has also been found in other genes expressed in the mammalian cochlea
- The repeated independent evolution of nylonase in two different strains of Flavobacterium and one strain of Pseudomonas.
- The myoglobin from the abalone Sulculus diversicolor has a different structure from normal myoglobin but serves a similar function — binding oxygen reversibly. "The molecular weight of Sulculus myoglobin is 41kD, 2.5 times larger than other myoglobins." Moreover, its amino acid sequence has no homology with other invertebrate myoglobins or with hemoglobins, but is 35% homologous with human indoleamine dioxygenase (IDO), a vertebrate tryptophan-degrading enzyme. It does not share similar function with IDO. "The IDO-like myoglobin is unexpectedly widely distributed among gastropodic molluscs, such as Sulculus, Nordotis, Battilus, Omphalius and Chlorostoma."
- The hemocyanin from arthropods and molluscs evolved from different ancestors, tyrosinase and insect storage proteins, respectively. They have different molecular weight and structure. However, the proteins both use copper binding sites to transport oxygen.
- The hexokinase, ribokinase, and galactokinase families of sugar kinases have similar enzymatic functions of sugar phosphorylation, but they evolved from three distinct nonhomologous families since they all have distinct three-dimensional folding and their conserved sequence patterns are strikingly different.
- Hemoglobins in jawed vertebrates and jawless fish evolved independently. The oxygen-binding hemoglobins of jawless fish evolved from an ancestor of cytoglobin which has no oxygen transport function and is expressed in fibroblast cells.
- Toxic agent, serine protease BLTX, in the venom produced by two distinct species, the North American short-tailed shrew (Blarina brevicauda) and the Mexican beaded lizard, undergo convergent evolution. Although their structures are similar, it turns out that they increased the enzyme activity and toxicity through different way of structure changes. These changes are not found in the other non-venomous reptiles or mammals.
- Another toxin BgK, a K+ channel-blocking toxin from the sea anemone Bunodosoma granulifera and scorpions adopt distinct scaffolds and unrelated structures, however, they have similar functions.
- Antifreeze proteins are a perfect example of convergent evolution. Different small proteins with a flat surface which is rich in threonine from different organisms are selected to bind to the surface of ice crystals. "These include two proteins from fish, the ocean pout and the winter flounder, and three very active proteins from insects, the yellow mealworm beetle, the spruce budworm moth, and the snow flea."
- RNA-binding proteins which contain RNA-binding domain (RBD) and the cold-shock domain (CSD) protein family are also an example of convergent evolution. Except that they both have conserved RNP motifs, other protein sequence are totally different. However, they have a similar function.
- Blue-light-receptive cryptochrome expressed in the sponge eyes likely evolved convergently in the absence of opsins and nervous systems. The fully sequenced genome of Amphimedon queenslandica, a demosponge larvae, lacks one vital visual component: opsin-a gene for a light-sensitive opsin pigment which is essential for vision in other animals.
- The structure of immunoglobulin G-binding bacterial proteins A and H do not contain any sequences homologous to the constant repeats of IgG antibodies, but they have similar functions. Both protein G, A, H are inhibited in the interactions with IgG antibodies (IgGFc) by a synthetic peptide corresponding to an 11-amino-acid-long sequence in the COOH-terminal region of the repeats.
- The evolution of cardiotonic steroid (CTS) resistance via amino acid substitutions at well-defined positions of the Na^{+},K^{+}-ATPase α-subunit in multiple insect species spanning 6 orders.

=== Structural convergence ===
Here is a list of examples in which unrelated proteins have similar tertiary structures but different functions. Whole protein structural convergence is not thought to occur but some convergence of pockets and secondary structural elements have been documented.

- Some secondary structure convergence occurs due to some residues favouring being in α-helix (helical propensity) and for hydrophobic patches or pocket to be formed at the ends of the parallel sheets.
- ABAC is a database of convergently evolved protein interaction interfaces. Examples comprise fibronectin/long chain cytokines, NEF/SH2, cyclophilin/capsid proteins.

=== Mutational convergence ===
The most well-studied example is the Spike protein of SARS-CoV-2, which independently evolved at the same positions regardless of the underlying sublineage. The most eminent examples from the pre-Omicron era were E484K and N501Y, while in the Omicron era examples include R493Q, R346X, N444X, L452X, N460X, F486X, and F490X.
