= Gigantopterus =

Gigantopterus Temporal range: Early Carnian

Scientific classification
- Kingdom: Animalia
- Phylum: Chordata
- Class: Actinopterygii
- Order: †Peltopleuriformes
- Family: †Thoracopteridae
- Genus: †Gigantopterus; Abel, 1906
- Species: †G. telleri

Binomial name
- †Gigantopterus telleri Abel, 1906

Extinct genus of fishes

Gigantopterus ("giant wing") is an extinct genus of prehistoric marine ray-finned fish that lived around what is now Europe during the Late Triassic epoch. A single species is known, G. telleri from the Carnian-aged Reingrabener Schiefer of Austria. Like its close relative Thoracopterus, it had convergently evolved large pectoral fins reminiscent of modern flying fish. Tintori & Sassi (1992) suggested that it may be synonymous with Thoracopterus, but Shen & Arratia (2021) reaffirmed it as being a distinct genus.

== See also ==
- Prehistoric fish
- List of prehistoric bony fish
