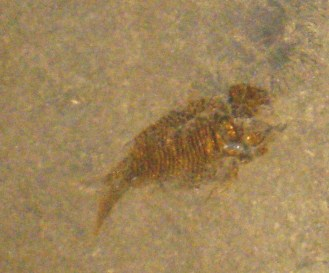

Scientific classification
- Kingdom: Animalia
- Phylum: Chordata
- Class: Actinopterygii
- Order: †Peltopleuriformes
- Family: †Peltopleuridae; Brough, 1939

Genera
- Marcopoloichthys; Placopleurus; Peltopleurus

= Peltopleuridae =

Peltopleuridae Temporal range: Middle Triassic–Late Triassic

Extinct family of ray-finned fishes

Peltopleuridae were an extinct family of prehistoric bony fish. It is classified with the order Peltopleuriformes.

== Classification ==
- Family †Peltopleuridae Brough 1939
  - Genus †Marcopoloichthys Tintori et al. 2008
    - †Marcopoloichthys ani Tintori et al. 2008
  - Genus †Placopleurus Brough
    - †P. primus Brough 1939
    - †P. besanensis (Bassani 1886) [Pholidophorus besanensis Bassani 1886]
  - Genus †Peltopleurus Kner 1866a [Tripelta Wade 1940]
    - †P. brachycephalus Liu & Yin 2006
    - †P. dirumptus Griffith 1977
    - †P. dubius Woodward 1890 [Tripelta dubia (Woodward 1890)]
    - †P. humilis Kner 1914
    - †P. kneri Woodward 1895
    - †P. lissocephalus Brough 1939
    - †P. nitidus Xu & Ma 2016
    - †P. nothocephalus Bürgin 1992
    - †P. nuptialis Lombardo 1999 [Peltopleurus humilis Kner 1914 in partim]
    - †P. orientalis Su 1959
    - †P. rugosus Brough 1939
    - †P. splendens Kner 1866a

== Bibliography ==
- Sepkoski, Jack (2002). "A compendium of fossil marine animal genera". Bulletins of American Paleontology. 364: 560.
