= Peltopleuriformes =

Peltopleuriformes Temporal range: Middle Triassic to Early Jurassic
- Thoracopterus

Scientific classification
- Kingdom: Animalia
- Phylum: Chordata
- Class: Actinopterygii
- Subclass: Neopterygii
- Order: †Peltopleuriformes; Lehman, 1966

Families
- †Peltopleuridae; †Thoracopteridae; †Wushaichthyidae

Extinct order of fishes

Peltopleuriformes is an extinct order of ray-finned fish. They were a successful and morphologically diverse group throughout much of the Triassic period, with some genera in the family Thoracopteridae closely converging on modern flying fish. It was previously assumed that they went extinct during the Triassic-Jurassic extinction event, but the discovery of Peripeltopleurus jurassicus from the Early Jurassic of Italy suggests that at least one lineage survived into the Jurassic.

== Classification ==
- Order †Peltopleuriformes Lehman, 1966 [Peltopleuroidei Lehman 1966]
  - Family †Peltopleuridae Brough, 1939
    - Genus †Marcopoloichthys Tintori et al., 2008
    - Genus †Placopleurus Brough, 1939
    - Genus †Peltopleurus Kner, 1866a [Tripelta Wade, 1940]
  - Superfamily †Thoracopteroidea Shen & Arratia, 2022
    - Family †Wushaichthyidae Shen & Arratia, 2022
      - Genus †Wushaichthys Xu et al., 2015
      - Genus †Peripeltopleurus Bürgin 1992
    - Family †Thoracopteridae Griffith, 1977 sensu Shen & Arratia, 2022
      - Genus †Thoracopterus Bronn, 1858
      - Genus †Gigantopterus Abel, 1906
      - Genus †Potanichthys Xu et al., 2013
      - Genus †Italopterus Shen & Arratia, 2022

== Bibliography ==
- Sepkoski, Jack (2002). "A compendium of fossil marine animal genera". Bulletins of American Paleontology. 364: 560.
