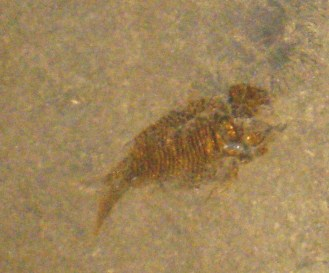
- Peripeltopleurus vexillipinnis

Scientific classification
- Kingdom: Animalia
- Phylum: Chordata
- Class: Actinopterygii
- Order: †Peltopleuriformes
- Family: †Wushaichthyidae
- Genus: †Peripeltopleurus

Type species
- †Peripeltopleurus vexillipinnis Bürgin, 1992

Other species
- †P. besanensis Bürgin, 1992; †P. hypsisomus Bürgin, 1992; †P. jurassicus Franceschi, Marramà, Carnevale, 2026

= Peripeltopleurus =

Peripeltopleurus Temporal range: Anisian-Sinemurian

Extinct genus of fishes

Peripeltopleurus is an extinct genus of prehistoric ray-finned fish that lived during the Anisian to Sinemurian ages of the Middle Triassic-Early Jurassic epoch. Represents the only known Jurassic survivor of the order Peltopleuriformes.

== See also ==
- Prehistoric fish
- List of prehistoric bony fish
