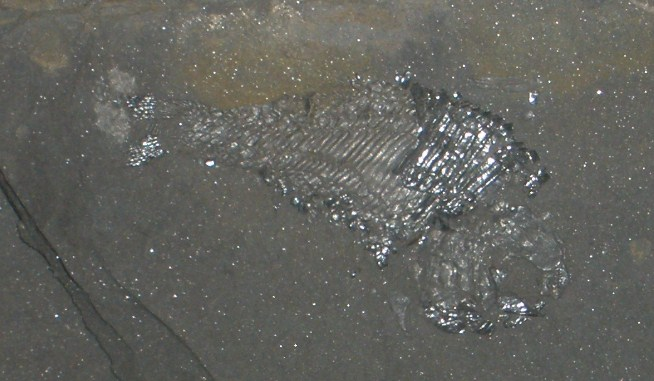
- Peltopleurus lissocephalus fossil

Scientific classification
- Kingdom: Animalia
- Phylum: Chordata
- Class: Actinopterygii
- Order: †Peltopleuriformes
- Family: †Peltopleuridae
- Genus: †Peltopleurus

Type species
- †Peltopleurus splendens Kner, 1866

Other species
- †P. dirumptus Griffith, 1977; †P. dubius Woodward, 1890; †P. humilis Kner, 1867; †P. kneri Woodward, 1895; †P. lissocephalus Brough, 1939; †P. nitidus Xu & Ma, 2016; †P. nothocephalus Bürgin, 1992; †P. nuptialis Lombardo, 1999; †P. orientalis Su, 1959; †P. rugosus Brough, 1939; †P. tyrannos Xu, Ma & Zhao, 2018

= Peltopleurus =

Peltopleurus Temporal range: Middle - Late Triassic

Extinct genus of fishes

Peltopleurus is an extinct genus of bony fish.

== See also ==
- Prehistoric fish
- List of prehistoric bony fish
