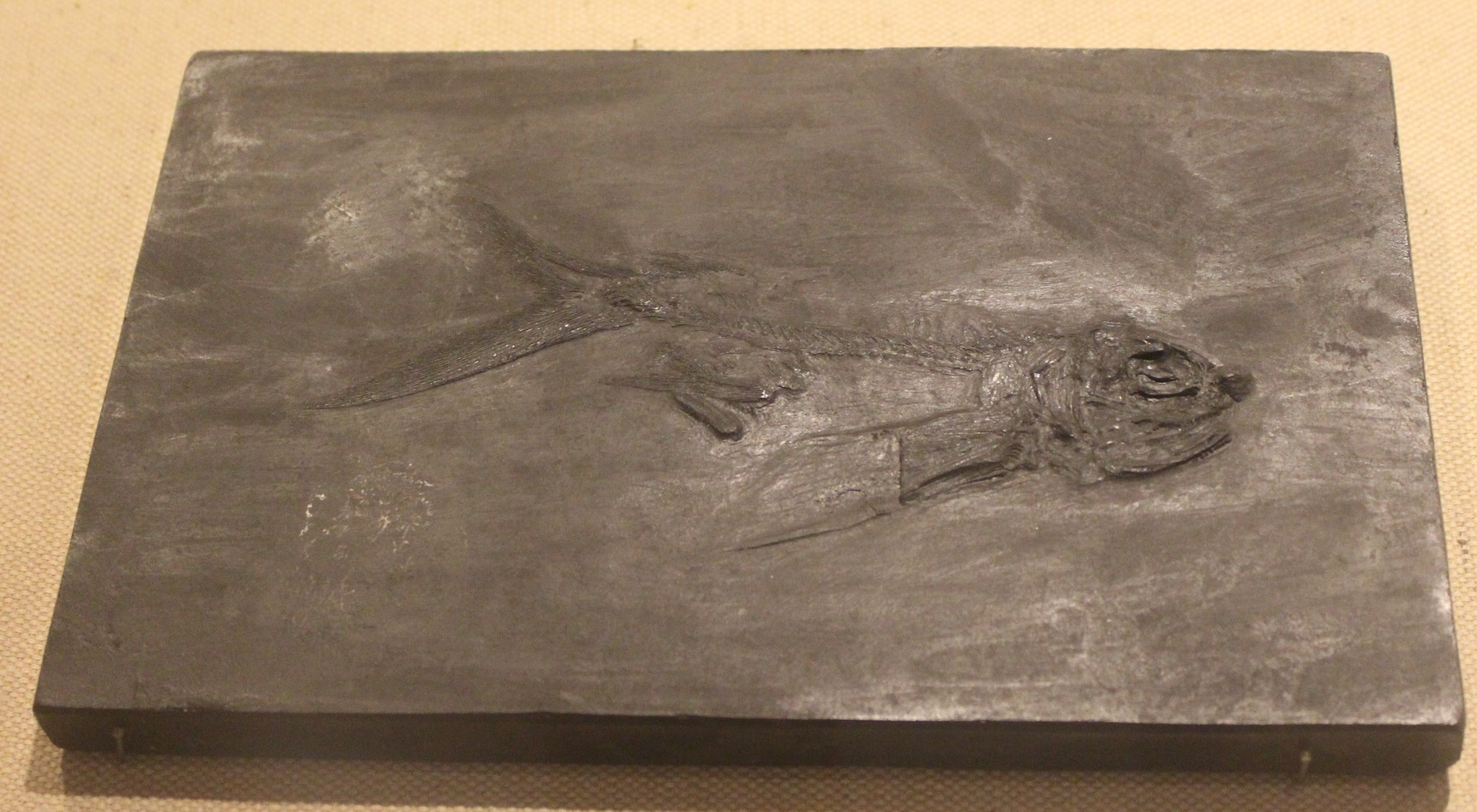
- Paratype of P. xingyiensis, Paleozoological Museum of China

Scientific classification
- Kingdom: Animalia
- Phylum: Chordata
- Class: Actinopterygii
- Subclass: Neopterygii
- Order: †Peltopleuriformes
- Family: †Thoracopteridae
- Genus: †Potanichthys; Xu et al., 2013
- Species: †P. xingyiensis

Binomial name
- †Potanichthys xingyiensis Xu et al., 2013

= Potanichthys =

Potanichthys xingyiensis Temporal range: Ladinian (Middle Triassic)

Extinct genus of fishes

Potanichthys is a fossil genus of thoracopterid fish found in deposits from China dating to the Ladinian age of the Middle Triassic epoch. The type species is P. xingyiensis, though P. wushaensis is considered as the alternative species name. It is known to have been the first vertebrate ever to have glided over water, and thus the first fish ever that had over-water gliding strategy. The genus name Potanichthys is a portmanteau of the Ancient Greek ποτάνος (potanos, winged/flying) and ιχθύς (ichthys, fish). The species epithet refers to Xingyi city which is near the site where Potanichthys was discovered.

Potanichthys was a small fish with an estimated total length of 15.3 cm (6.0 in). It shared aerodynamic characteristics with the modern flying fish, including a pair of greatly enlarged pectoral fins and a pair of pelvic fins. The pectoral fins would have acted as 'primary wings', while the pelvic fins would have functioned as 'auxiliary wings', making Potanichthys to have a 'four-winged' body plan. In addition, the asymmetrical and deeply forked caudal fin, with the ventral lobe much stronger than the dorsal lobe, would have generated enough power to launch Potanichthys over water to glide. This anatomical similarity is a result of convergent evolution, meaning that both lineages, thoracopterids and exocoetids (family of flying fish), evolved such features independently at different times: throacopterids during the Middle Triassic and exocoetids during the Eocene.

== See also ==
- Thoracopterus
