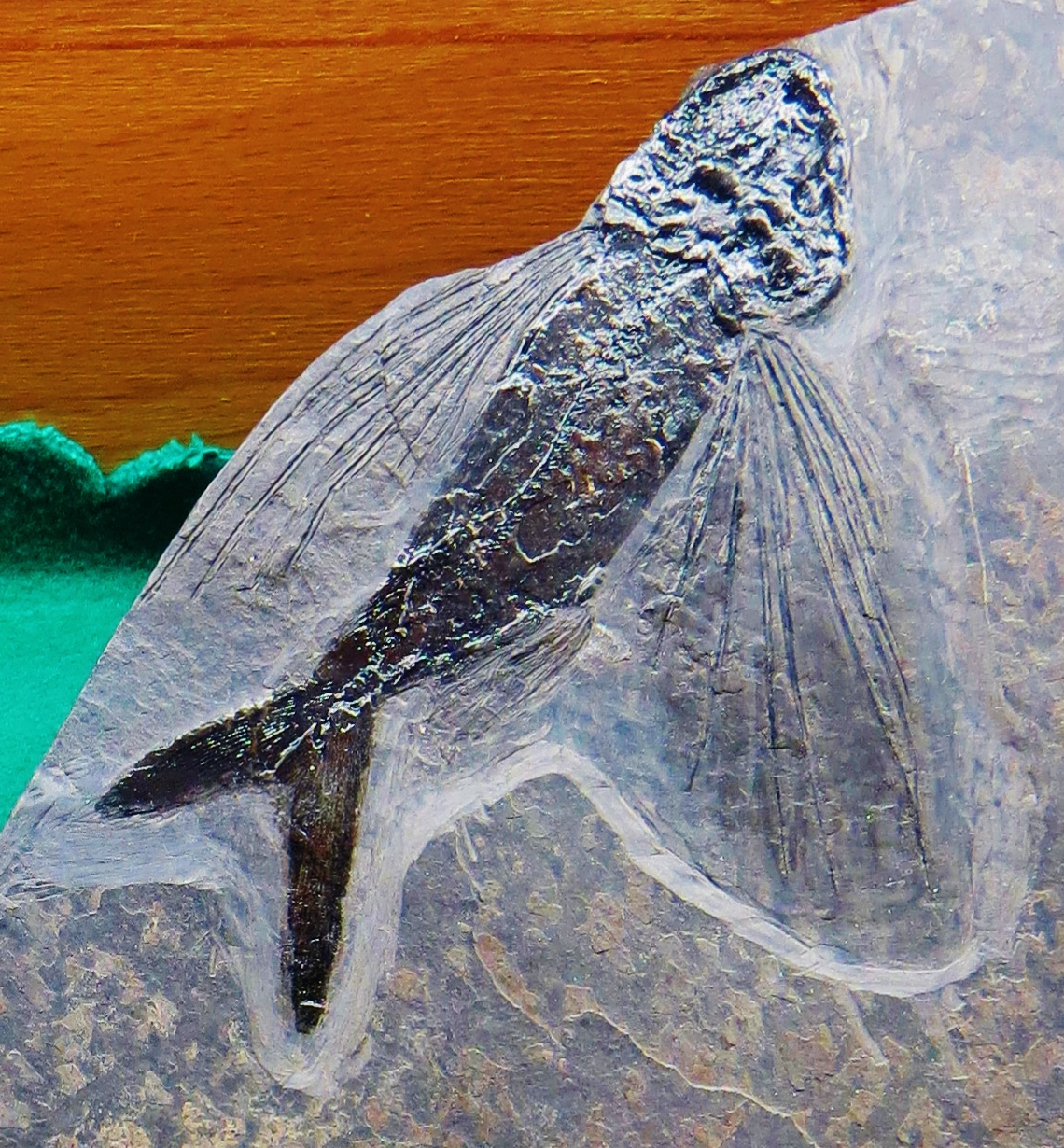
- Italopterus magnificus fossil

Scientific classification
- Kingdom: Animalia
- Phylum: Chordata
- Class: Actinopterygii
- Order: †Peltopleuriformes
- Family: †Thoracopteridae; Griffith, 1977 sensu Xu et al., 2013

Genera
- †Thoracopterus; †Gigantopterus; †Potanichthys; †Italopterus

= Thoracopteridae =

Thoracopteridae Temporal range: Ladinian–Norian

Extinct family of ray-finned fishes

Thoracopteridae is an extinct family of prehistoric bony fish classified with the order Peltopleuriformes, containing four genera: Thoracopterus, Gigantopterus, Potanichthys and Italopterus. This lineage of Triassic flying fish-like Perleidiformes converted their pectoral and pelvic fins into broad wings very similar to those of their modern counterparts. However, this group is not related to modern flying fish from the family Exocoetidae, instead being a case of convergent evolution.

== Classification ==
- Family †Thoracopteridae Griffith, 1977 sensu Xu et al., 2013
  - Genus †Thoracopterus Bronn, 1858
    - †Thoracopterus niederristi Bronn, 1858
  - Genus †Gigantopterus Abel, 1906
    - †Gigantopterus telleri Abel, 1906
  - Genus †Potanichthys Xu et al., 2013
    - †Potanichthys xingyiensis Xu et al., 2013 (or †Potanichthys wushaensis Tintori et al., 2012)
  - Genus †Italopterus Shen & Arratia, 2022
    - †Italopterus martinisi Tintori & Sassi, 1992
    - †Italopterus magnificus Tintori & Sassi, 1992

== Bibliography ==
- Sepkoski, Jack (2002). "A compendium of fossil marine animal genera". Bulletins of American Paleontology. 364: 560.
