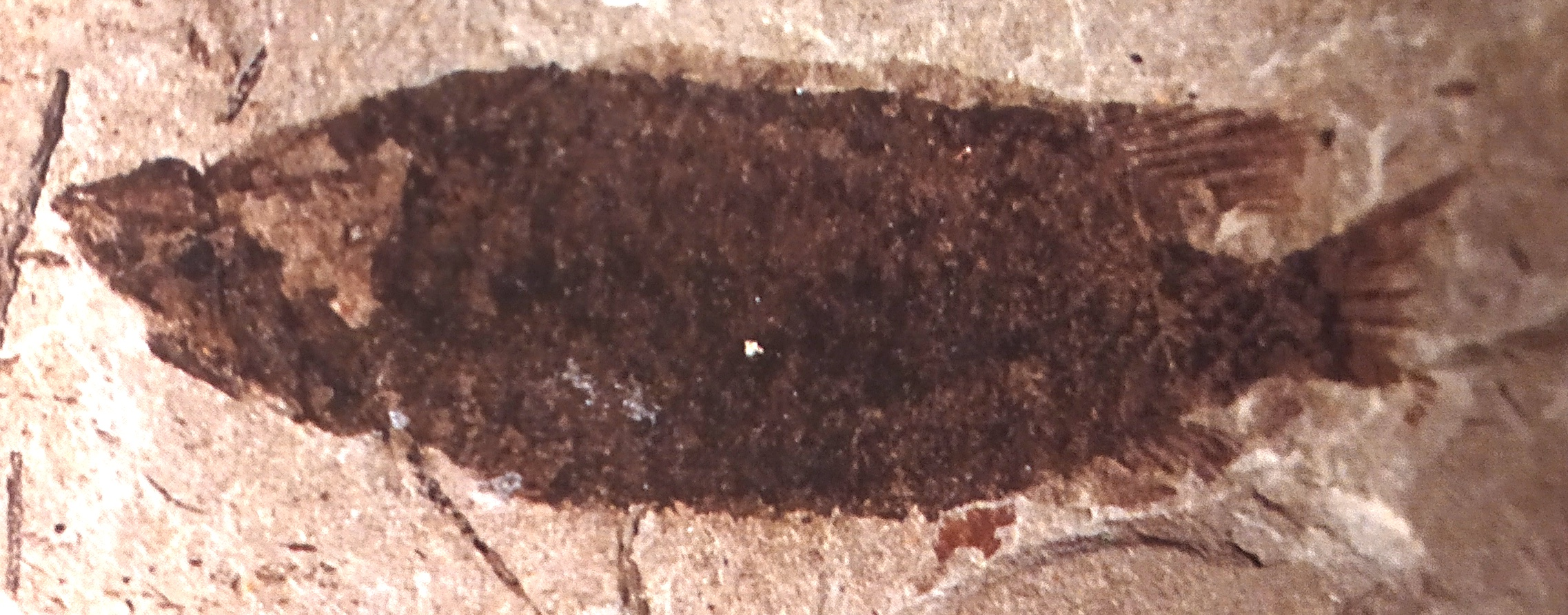
- Tripelta Dubia

Scientific classification
- Domain: Eukaryota
- Kingdom: Animalia
- Phylum: Chordata
- Class: Actinopterygii
- Order: †Perleidiformes
- Genus: †Tripelta; Wade, 1939
- Species: †T. dubia

Binomial name
- †Tripelta dubia (Woodward, 1890)

= Tripelta =

Tripelta Temporal range: Anisian

Extinct genus of fishes

Tripelta is an extinct genus of prehistoric bony fish that lived during the Anisian age (Middle Triassic epoch) in what is now New South Wales, Australia.

Fossils are derived from the Sydney sandstone. The type and only species, Tripelta dubia, was first described as Peltopleurus dubius by Arthur Smith Woodward, but Robert Thompson Wade later erected the new genus Tripelta for this species.

== See also ==
- Prehistoric fish
- List of prehistoric bony fish
