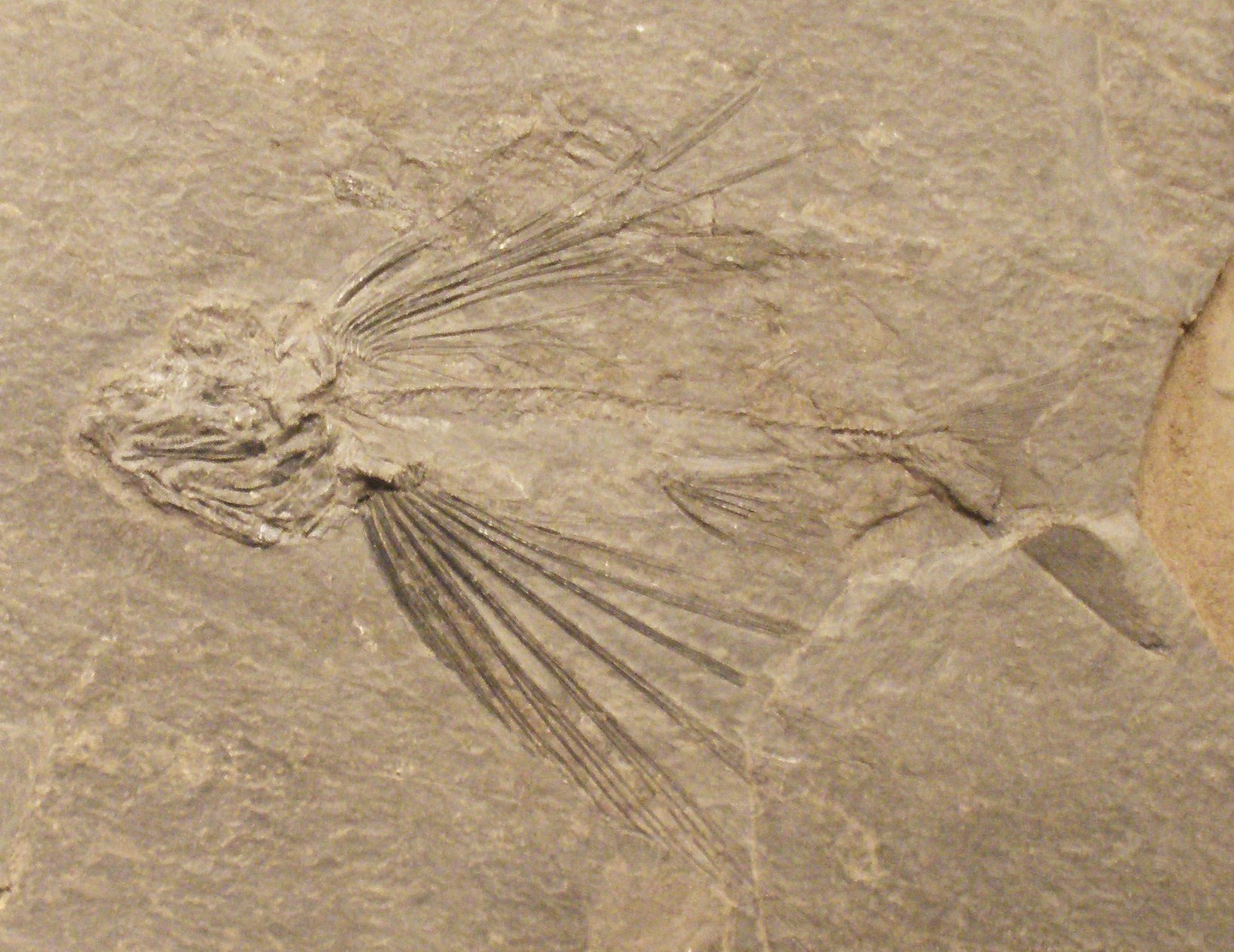
- Fossilised Thoracopterus Magnificus

Scientific classification
- Kingdom: Animalia
- Phylum: Chordata
- Class: Actinopterygii
- Order: †Peltopleuriformes
- Family: †Thoracopteridae
- Genus: †Thoracopterus; Bronn, 1858
- Species: †T. niederristi

Binomial name
- †Thoracopterus niederristi Bronn, 1858

= Thoracopterus =

Thoracopterus niederristi Temporal range: Carnian

Extinct genus of fishes

Thoracopterus is an extinct genus of overwater gliding ray-finned fish from the Carnian age of the Late Triassic. The type species is T. niederristi. In 2026, a second species, T. polzbergensis, was erected.

Thoracopterus had elongate pectoral fins, similar to modern Exocoetidae, which are used to glide overwater in order to escape aquatic predators. Thoracopterus represents one of the earliest known example for overwater gliding in actinopterygians.

== Former species ==
- †Thoracopterus martinisi Tintori & Sassi, 1992 → †Italopterus martinisi (Tintori & Sassi, 1992)
- †Thoracopterus magnificus Tintori & Sassi, 1992 → †Italopterus magnificus (Tintori & Sassi, 1992)

== See also ==
- Fishes of the World by Joseph S. Nelson (page 95)
- Wildlife of Gondwana: Dinosaurs and Other Vertebrates from the Ancient Supercontinent (Life of the Past) by Pat Vickers Rich, Thomas Hewitt Rich, Francesco Coffa, and Steven Morton
- The Rise of Fishes: 500 Million Years of Evolution by John A. Long
