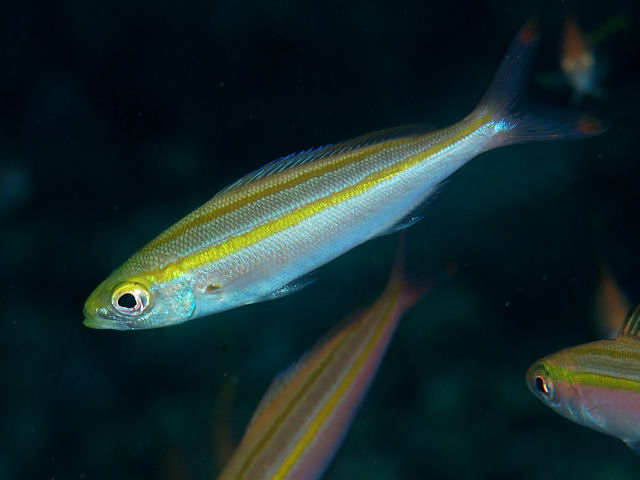

Conservation status
- Least Concern (IUCN 3.1)

Scientific classification
- Kingdom: Animalia
- Phylum: Chordata
- Class: Actinopterygii
- Order: Acanthuriformes
- Family: Lutjanidae
- Genus: Pterocaesio
- Species: P. digramma

Binomial name
- Pterocaesio digramma (Bleeker, 1865)

Synonyms
- Caesio digramma Bleeker, 1865

= Double-lined fusilier =

Species of fish

The double-lined fusilier (Pterocaesio digramma), also known as the double stripe fusilier or blacktipped fusilier, is a species of marine ray-finned fish, a fusilier belonging to the family Caesionidae. It is widespread around reefs in the Indo-West Pacific region.

== Taxonomy ==
The double-lined fusilier was first formally described as Caesio digramma in 1865 by the Dutch ichthyologist Pieter Bleeker with the type locality given as Ambon Island in Indonesia. In his 1987 review of the Caesionidae, Kent E. Carpenter placed this species within the subgenus Pisinnicaesio. The specific name digramma means 'two lined', a reference to the two yellow stripes on each side of the body, one on its back and one on its flanks.

== Description ==
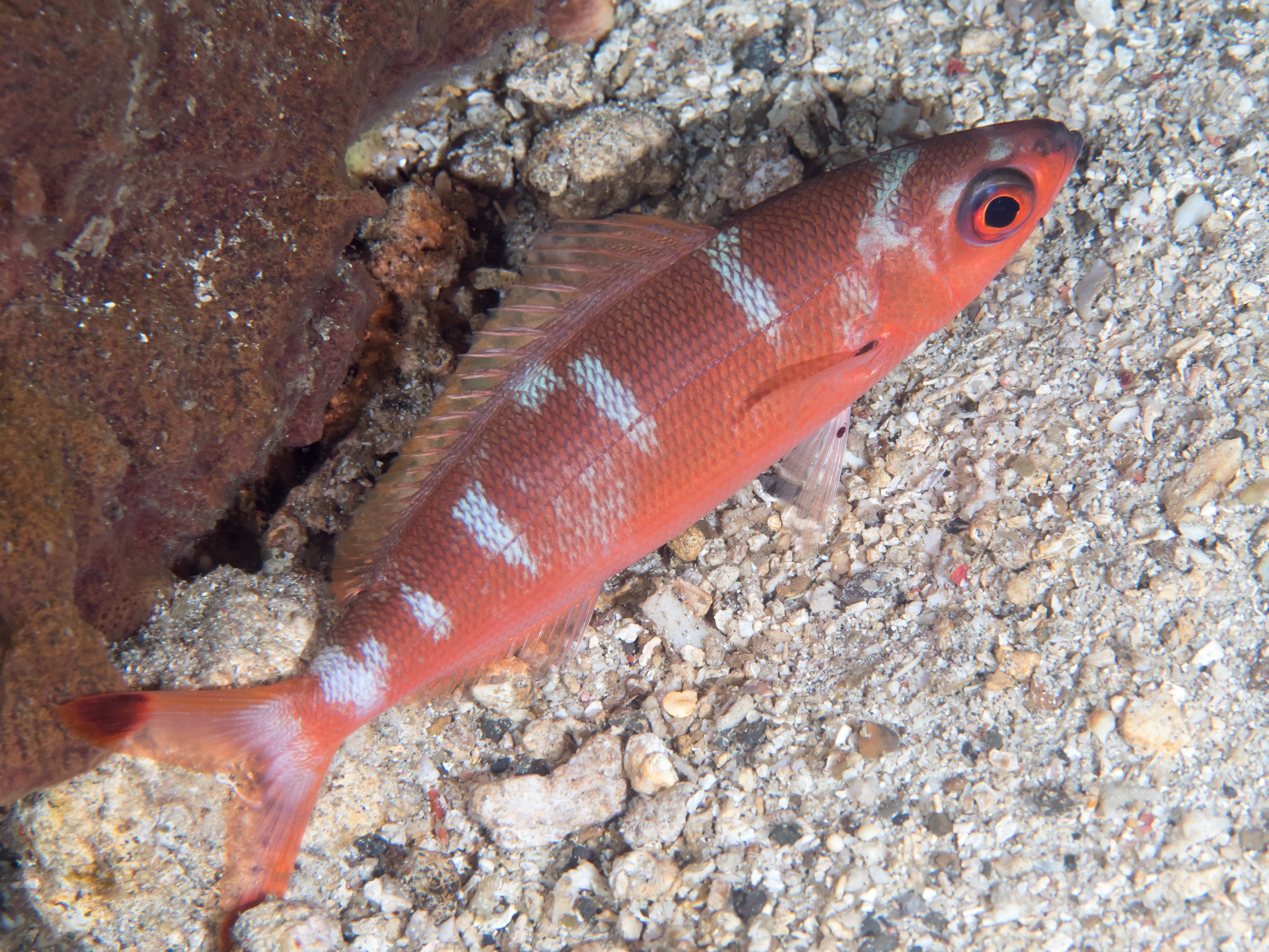

The double-lined fusilier has a fusiform and elongated body which is moderately laterally compressed. There are small conical teeth in the jaws and on the vomer and palatines. The dorsal fin contains 10 spines and 14–16 soft rays while the anal fin has three spines and 11–12 soft rays. There are scales on both the dorsal and anal fins. There are 20–22 rays in the pectoral fins. This species attains a maximum total length of 30 cm (12 in). The overall colour is bluish-green lightening towards the lower body. There are a pair of slender yellow stripes along the back and middle of the flank. The caudal fin lobes have dark tips. The more ventral yellow stripe is mainly underneath the lateral line, apart from the portion on the caudal peduncle.

== Distribution and habitat ==
The double-lined fusilier is found in the Western Pacific Ocean where it occurs from Indonesia, Western Australia and New Caledonia to southern Japan. It has also been recorded off Norfolk Island and in Tonga. The record from Réunion is probably a mis-identified Pterocaesio marri. It occurs in coastal waters at depths down to 50 m (160 ft), mainly around coral reefs.

== Biology ==
Double-lined fusiliers feed on zooplankton in midwater where they gather in large schools. They are oviparous, laying many small pelagic eggs. Spawning takes place close to sunset when the spawning fish break away from the school, usually followed by "sneaker" males. A male selects a female and starts to push at and nip at her belly before pushing her and then the pair start to swim in half circles around each other. This is when up to 15 sneaker males join in as it is now that the initial pair release eggs and sperm while belly-to-belly at the surface. The sneakers closest to the pair also release their sperm at this point; the pair and the sneakers then return to the school.

== Fisheries ==
The double-lined fusilier is subjected to heavy fishing pressure in many parts of its range. They are caught using drive-in nets, gill nets and fish traps, as well as by illegal blast fishing. It can be an important food fish, being popular in the Philippines. The landings are sold fresh or preserved as salt fish.

== Culinary uses ==
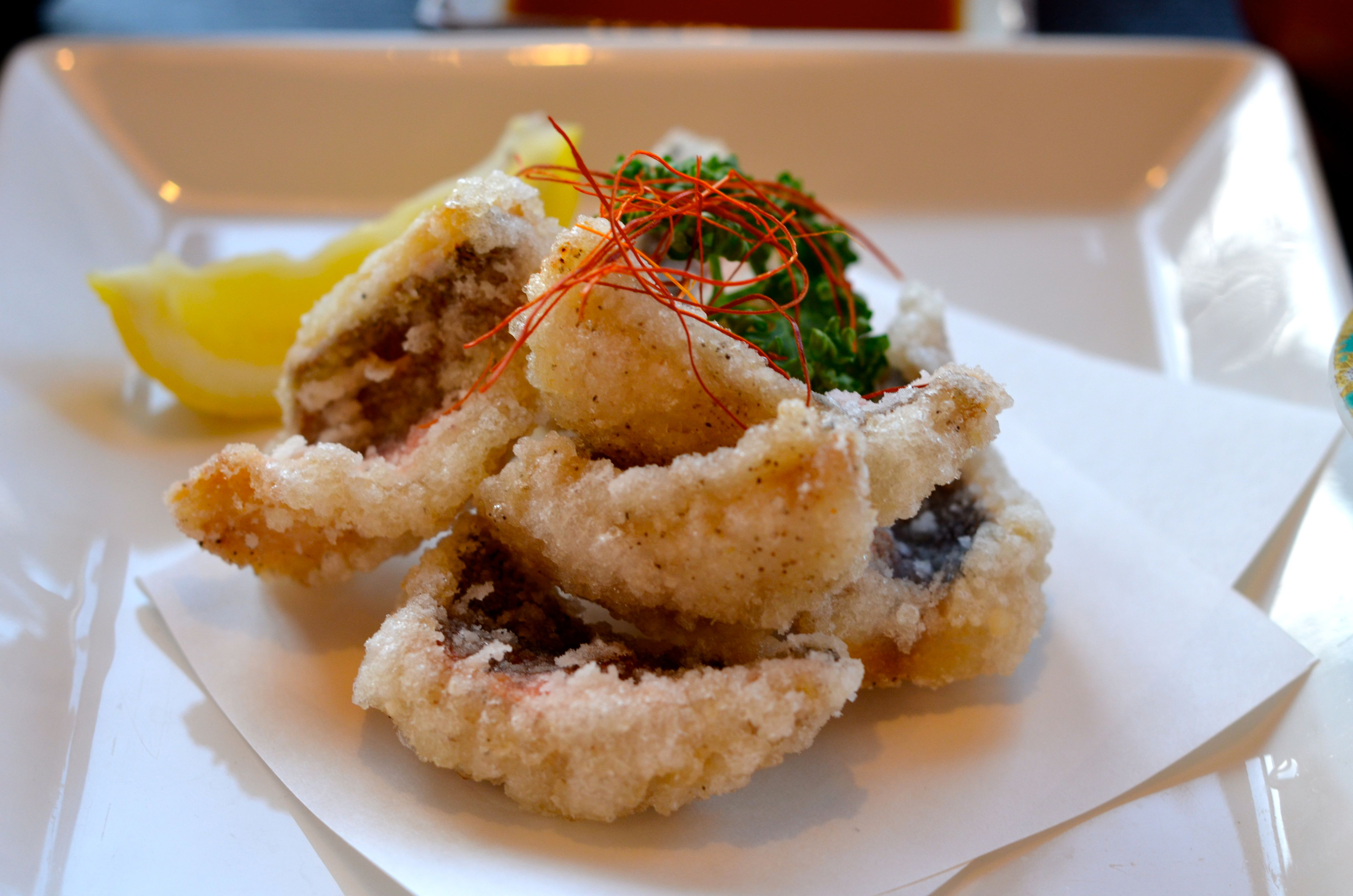
Fillets of Okinawan-style deep-fried gurukun

The double-lined fusilier and other fusilier species are commonly eaten in Japan, where they are known as takasago (タカサゴ). Known as gurukun (グルクン) in Okinawan, it is the prefectural fish of Okinawa and particularly common in Okinawan cuisine, mostly commonly served deep-fried as kara-age. In English, it is sometimes called "banana fish", although this may also refer to other related species like Pterocaesio pisang.
