= Taiwanese fried chicken cutlet =

Taiwanese street food

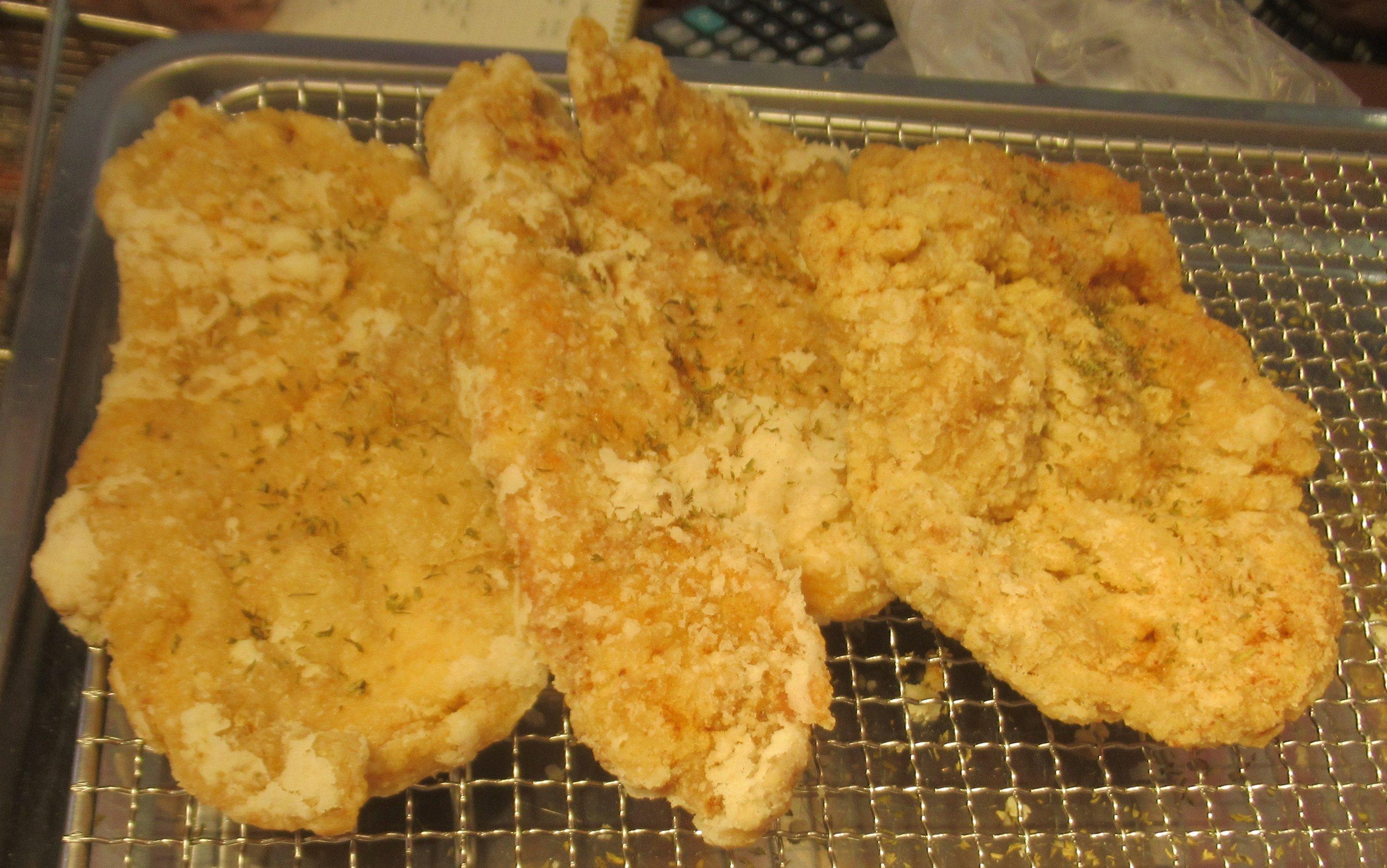
- Place of origin: Taiwan
- Main ingredients: Chicken breast and various spices

Chinese name
- Traditional Chinese: 炸雞排
Transcriptions
Standard Mandarin
- Hanyu Pinyin: zhàjīpái
Southern Min
- Hokkien POJ: chha̍t-ke-pâi

Alternative Chinese name
- Traditional Chinese: 香雞排
Transcriptions
Standard Mandarin
- Hanyu Pinyin: xiāngjīpái
Southern Min
- Hokkien POJ: hiong-ke-pâi

Taiwanese fried chicken cutlet (Chinese: 炸雞排 or 香雞排) is a common street food that was popularized in the 1990s in Taiwan and is often found in night markets. The dish consists of marinated chicken breast fillets that are dredged in sweet potato flour and rice flour, breaded with panko, shallow-fried, and then seasoned with various different spices. Salt, five-spice powder, and white pepper are the most fundamental seasonings for this dish, though other spices such as ginger powder, garlic powder, cumin, MSG, chili powder, paprika, curry leaves, sugar, sesame oil, and li hing mui powder are also used.

== Origins ==
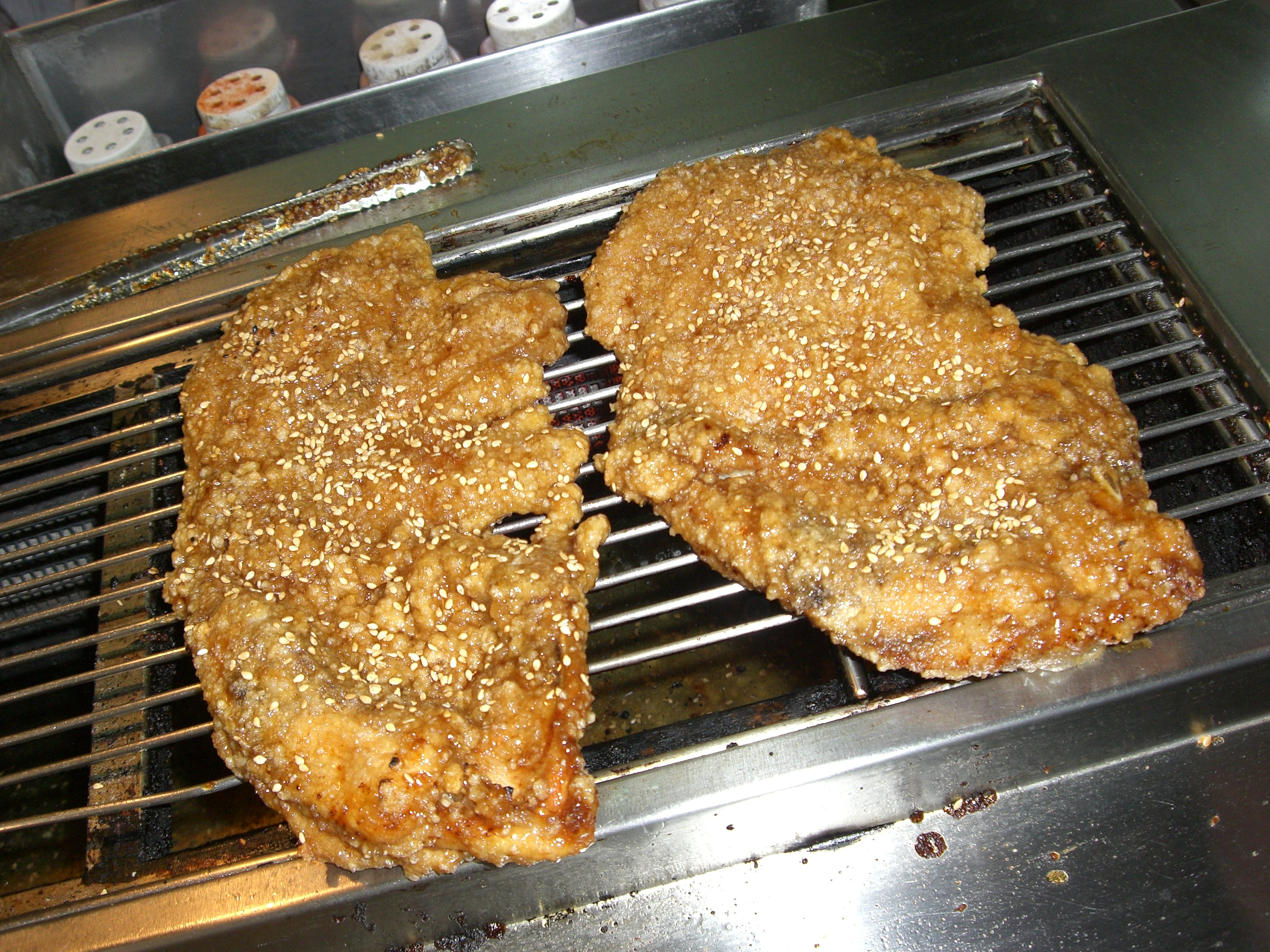
Fried chicken cutlets at Shilin Night Market

The origins of Taiwanese fried chicken cutlets trace back to the adaptations of American-style Southern fried chicken by street vendors in Tainan during the late 20th century. These vendors modified the traditional recipe to suit local tastes, incorporating indigenous spices and cooking techniques. Over time, the dish gained popularity, evolving into various regional versions and inspiring numerous adaptations.

== Preparation ==
Traditionally, cutlets are made from boneless and skinless chicken breast fillets that have been butterflied and flattened in order to reach a consistent and thick texture. The chicken is then marinated in a mixture of soy sauce, oyster sauce, minced garlic, white pepper, sugar, and five-spice powder for at least 30 minutes. After marinating, the chicken is coated in a batter made from egg and cornstarch, followed by a layer of sweet potato flour, rice flour, or tapioca starch. The cutlets are then shallow-fried in oil over medium heat for 3-4 minutes. Finally, additional seasonings such as chili powder, paprika, five-spice powder, and salt are sprinkled onto the cutlet.

== Health considerations ==
Taiwanese fried chicken cutlets tend to have higher levels of calories and sodium. Servings of the cutlet can have anywhere from between 350-450 calories and around 1000 milligrams of sodium, which is 44% of the recommended daily intake.

== Variations ==
- Spicy Taiwanese fried chicken cutlets: incorporates hot peppers for spice
- Cheese-stuffed fried chicken cutlets: features a cheese filling
- Popcorn chicken: smaller, bite-sized pieces seasoned and fried

== Gallery ==
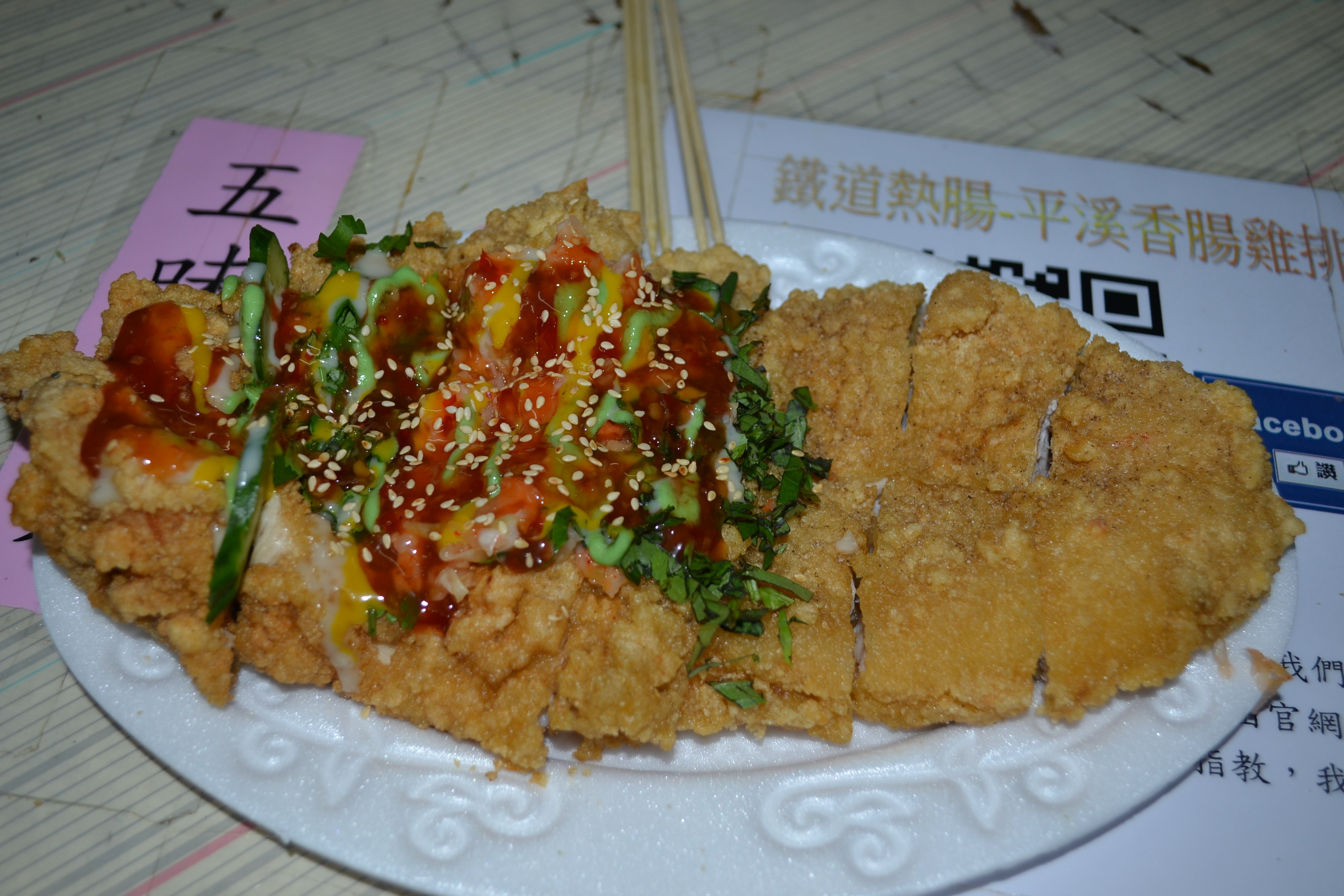
Fried chicken cutlet from Pinxi Old Street in February 2015

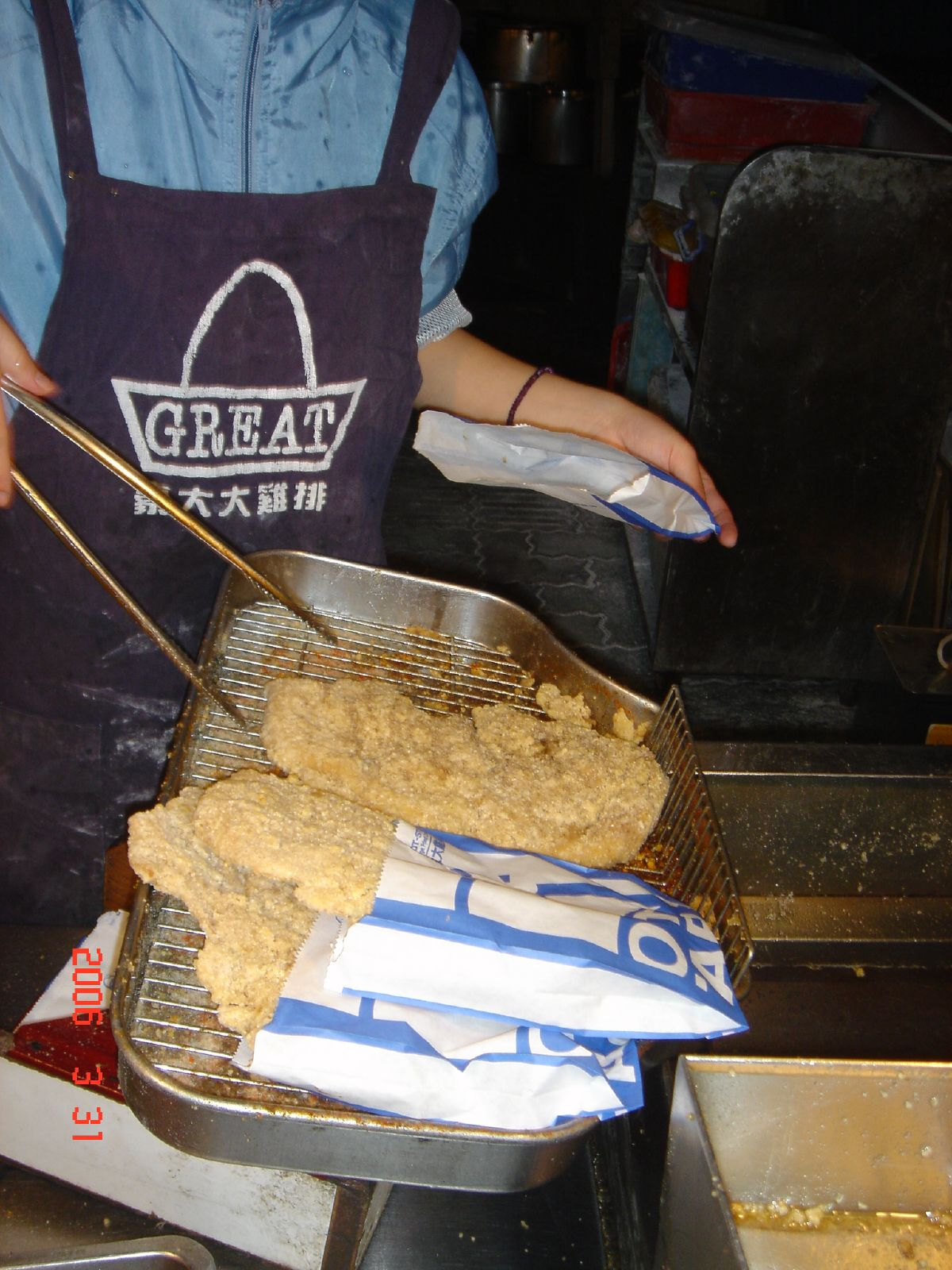
Man selling fried chicken cutlets in Zhongli in March 2006

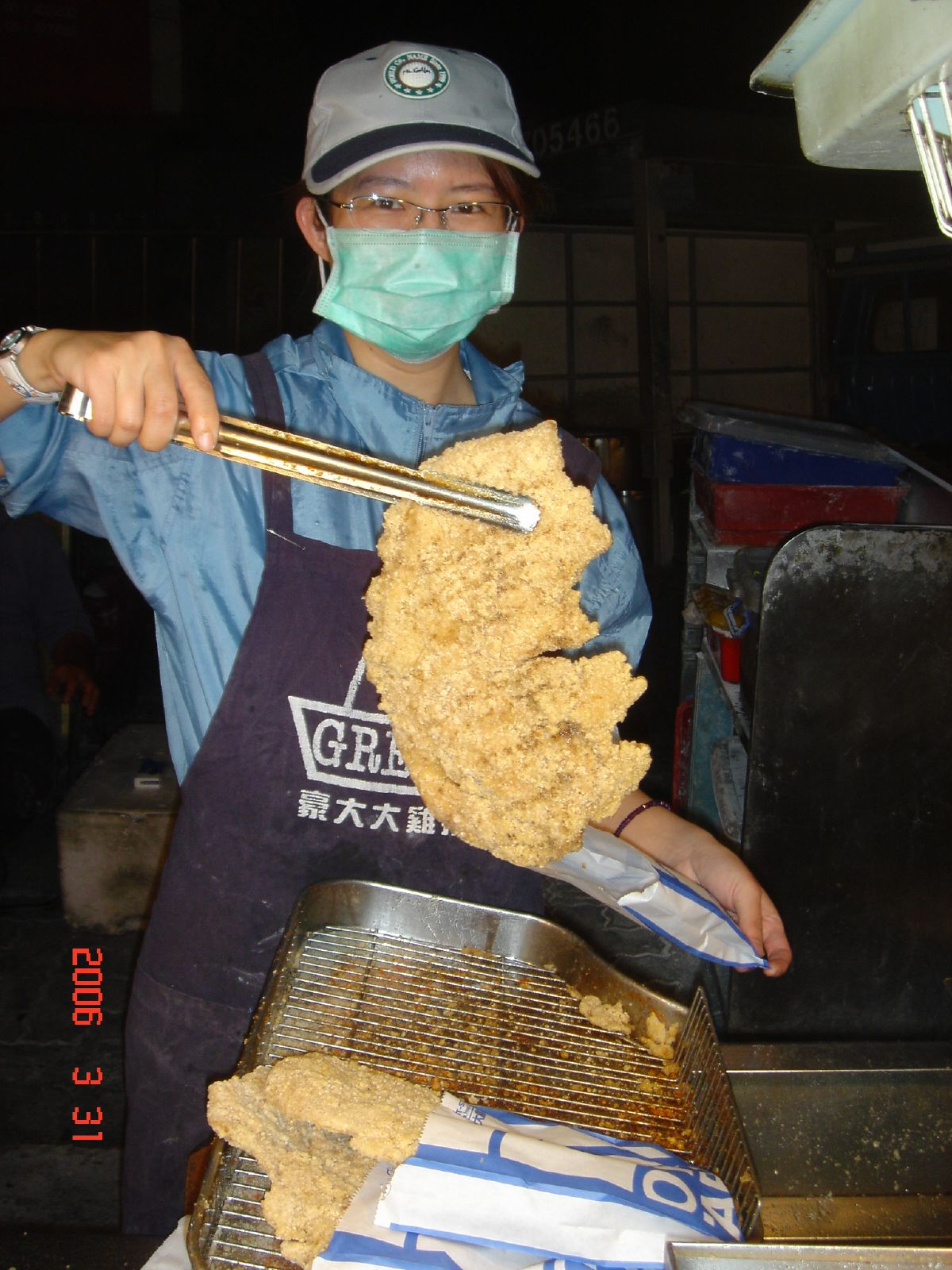
Man picking up fried chicken cutlet with tongs to sell; March 2006

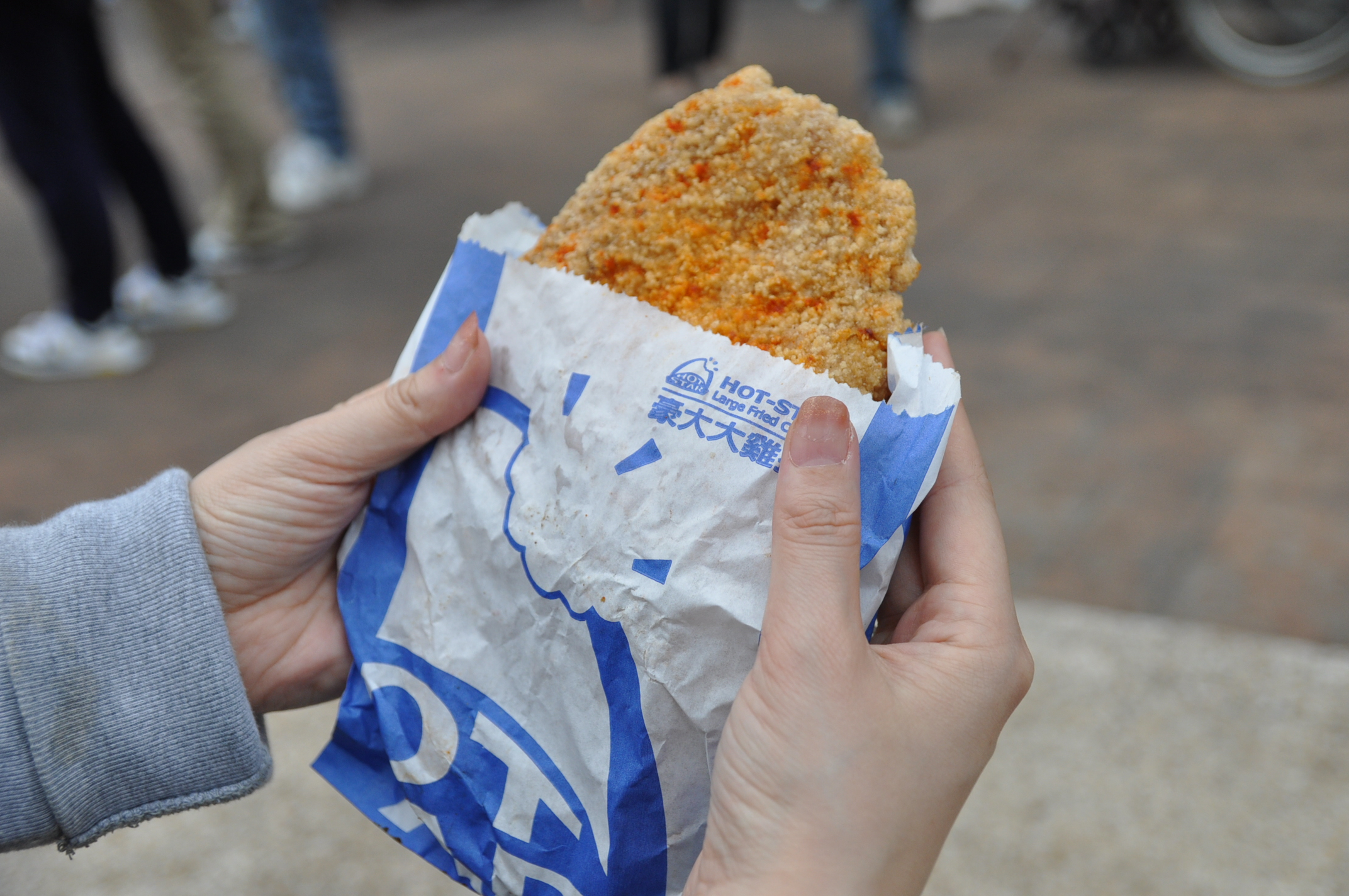
A fried chicken cutlet; March 2009

== See also ==
- Karaage
- Barbecue chicken
- Chicken katsu
- Taiwanese cuisine
