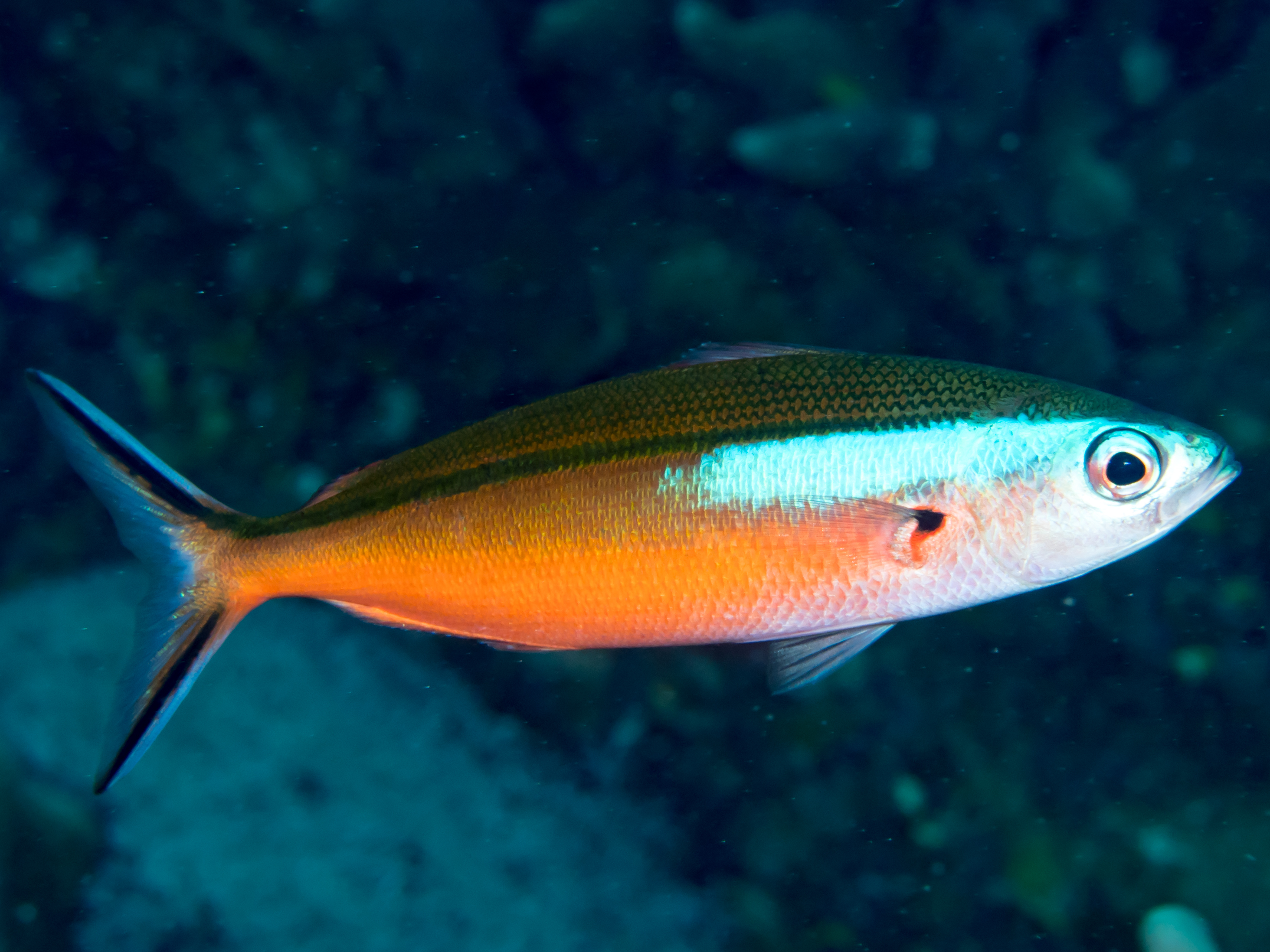
- In Indonesia

Conservation status
- Least Concern (IUCN 3.1)

Scientific classification
- Kingdom: Animalia
- Phylum: Chordata
- Class: Actinopterygii
- Division: Teleostei
- Order: Acanthuriformes
- Family: Lutjanidae
- Genus: Pterocaesio
- Species: P. tile

Binomial name
- Pterocaesio tile (Cuvier, 1830)

Synonyms
- List: Caesio tile Cuvier, 1830; Caesio tricolor Cuvier, 1830; Caesio cylindricus Günther, 1859; Caesio multiradiatus Steindachner, 1861; Clupeolabrus dubius Nichols, 1923

= Dark-banded fusilier =

Species of fish

The dark-banded fusilier (Pterocaesio tile), also known as blue-streak fusilier, bluedash fusilier, or neon fusilier, is a species of marine ray-finned fish, a fusilier belonging to the family Caesionidae. It has a wide Indo-West Pacific range. It is of some importance to fisheries within its range.

== Taxonomy ==
The dark-banded fusilier was first formally described as Caesio tile in 1830 by the French zoologist Georges Cuvier with the type locality given as the Caroline Islands. When the Dutch ichthyologist Pieter Bleeker described Pterocaesio as a new genus in 1876 he used Caesio multiradiatus, a species described by the Austrian ichthyologist Franz Steindachner in 1861, as the type species. C. multiradiatus was subsequently considered to be a synonym of Cuvier's C. tile. Kent E. Carpenter placed this species in the monospecific subgenus Pterocaesio in his review of the Caesionidae of 1987.

The specific name tile is the local name for this species in the Caroline Islands.

== Distribution and habitat ==
The dark-banded fusilier is widespread in Indo-Pacific, from East Africa to the Tuamoto Islands, southern Japan, Mauritius, and the Austral Islands.

In Australian waters it occurs at the Rowley Shoals off Western Australia, Ashmore Reef in the Timor Sea and on the far northern Great Barrier Reef, as well as at reefs in the Coral Sea to the Solitary Islands in New South Wales and at Christmas Island and the Cocos (Keeling) Islands.

This species is a coral-reef associated species. It usually can be found in lagoon and on the reef flats at depths to 60 m (200 ft).

== Description ==
The dark banded fusilier has been recorded growing up to a total length of 30 cm (12 in), although a standard length of 21.2 cm (8.3 in) is more typical. It has a fusiform, elongated and compressed body. There are small conical teeth in the jaws and on the vomer and palatines. The dorsal fin contains 10–12 spines and 19–22 soft rays, while the anal fin has three spines and 13 soft rays. There are scales on both the dorsal and anal fins. There are 22–24 rays in the pectoral fins.

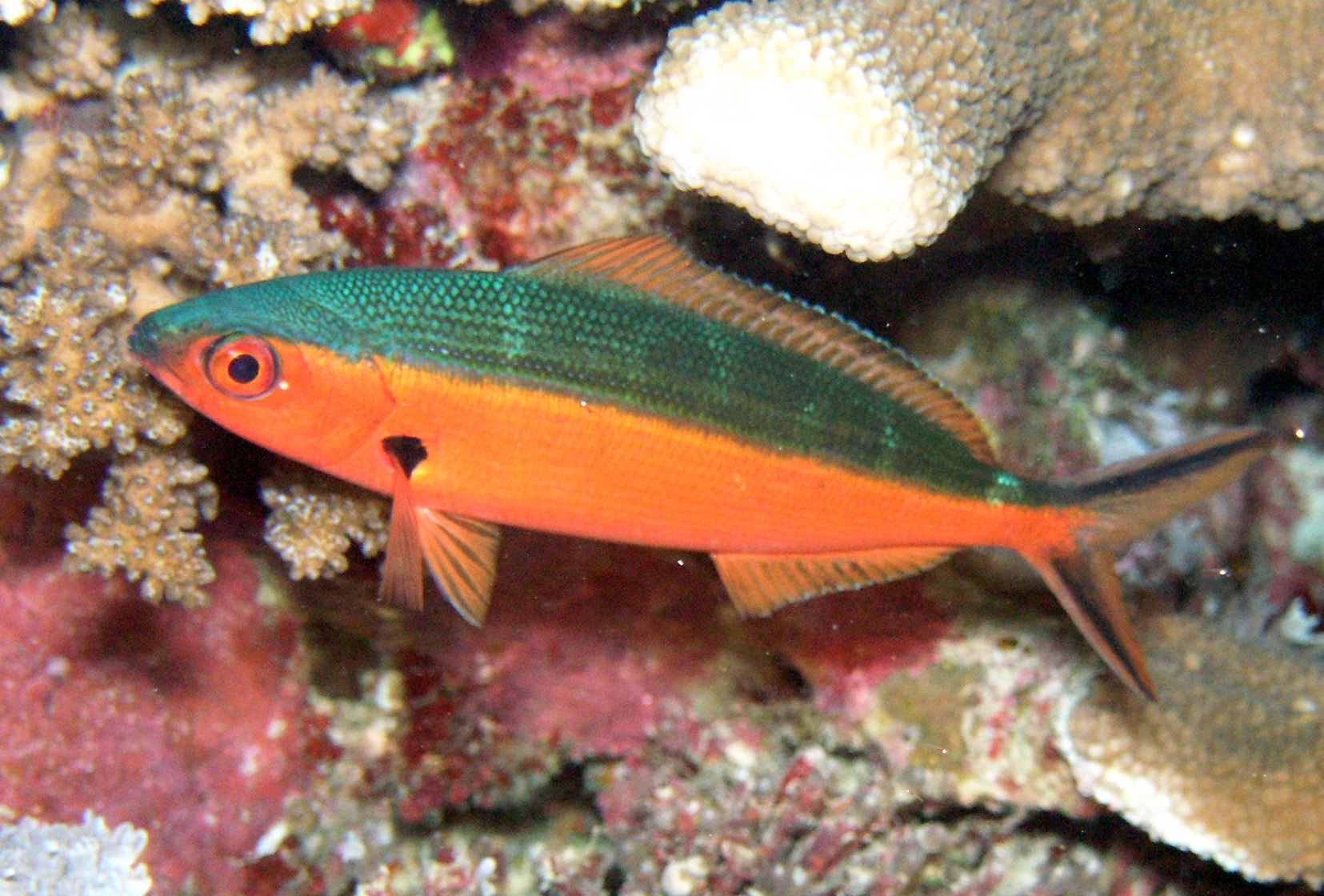
P. tile can change colour to have dark dorsal and red ventral regions

The overall colour is brownish with each scale on the back having a white spot creating rows. The lower body is pink to reddish, and there is a wide iridescent blue stripe extending from the snout to the caudal peduncle edged above by a thin black stripe reaching onto the upper lobe of the caudal fin. There is also a black spot on the base of the pectoral fin. They can quickly change colour, darkening to reddish below while shortening the blue stripe. The dorsal fin is pale bluish-green to pinkish and there is a black streak in the lower lobe of the caudal fin, separate from the black lateral stripe which runs onto the upper lobe.

== Biology ==
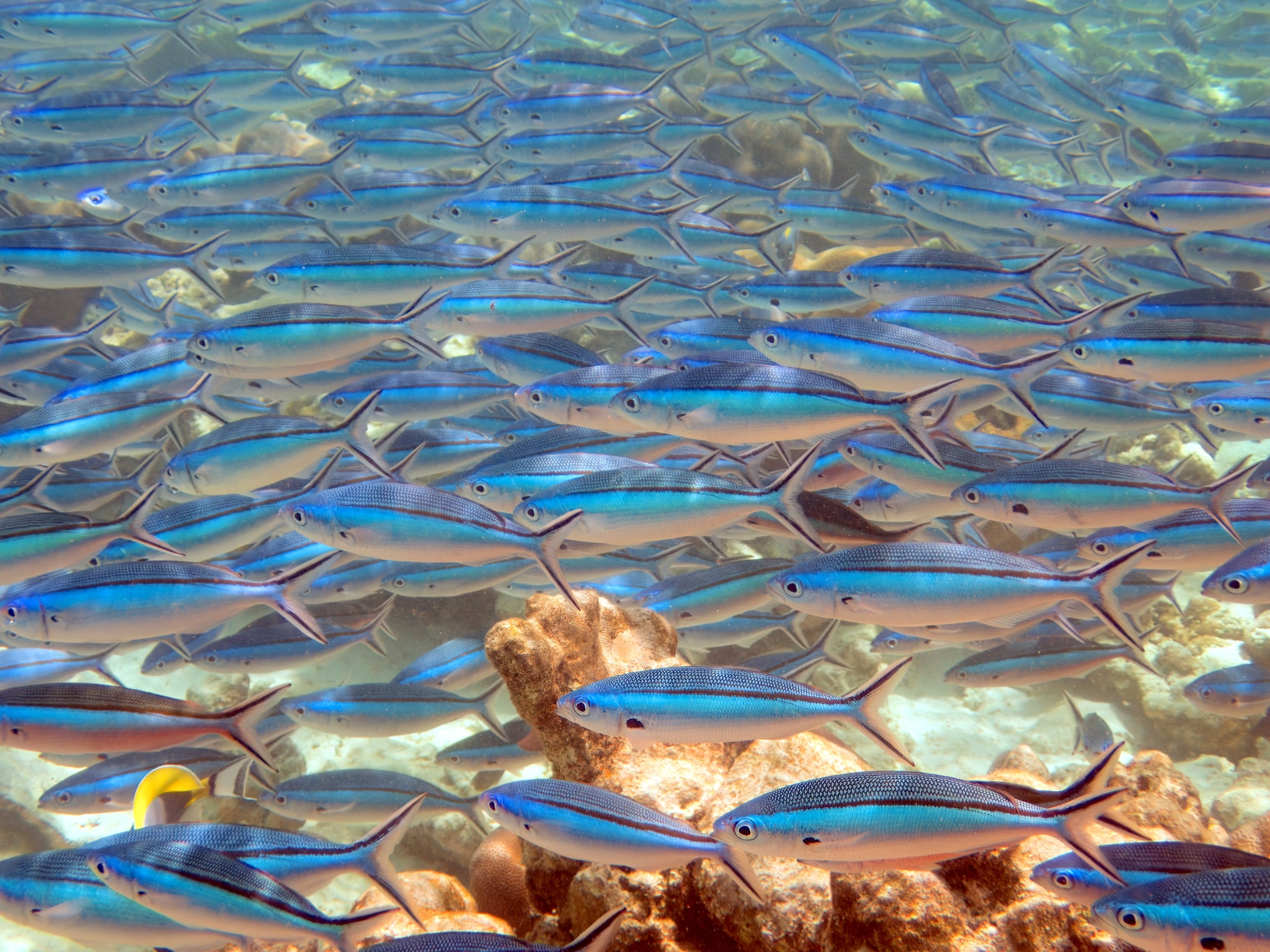
In the Maldives

The dark-banded fusilier is a schooling fish and it joins in mixed schools with other fusiliers. The juveniles can occur in large aggregations in shallow lagoons and on reef flats. The schools forage for zooplankton in midwater. It is an oviparous species which lays large numbers of small, pelagic eggs.

== Fisheries ==
The dark-banded fusilier is heavily exploited in parts of its range, it is fished for using drive-in nets, gill nets, traps and blast fishing it is also caught to be used as bait by commercial tuna fisheries. Where it is sold for human consumption it can be sold as fresh fish or preserved as salt fish.

== Gallery ==
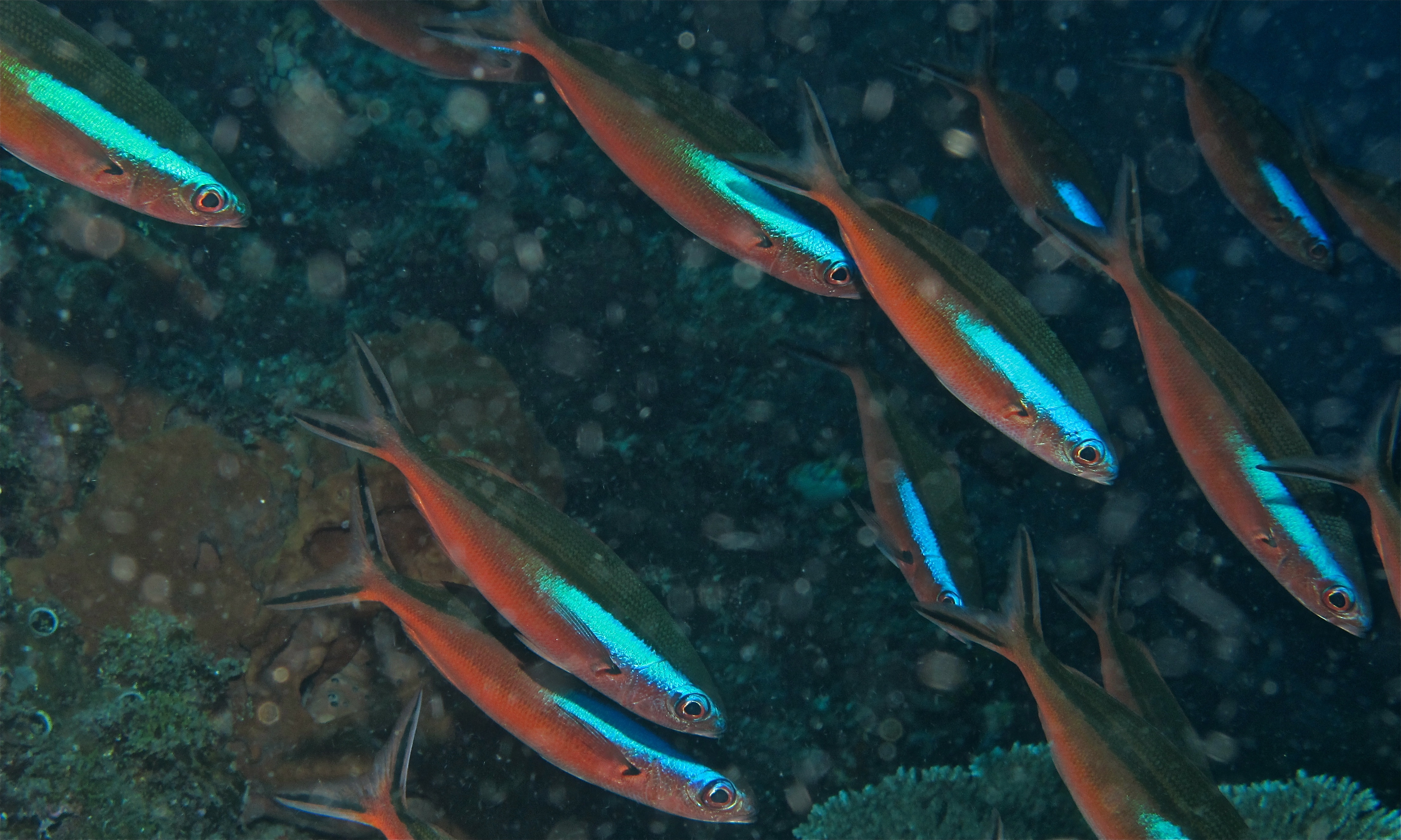
School, in Indonesia

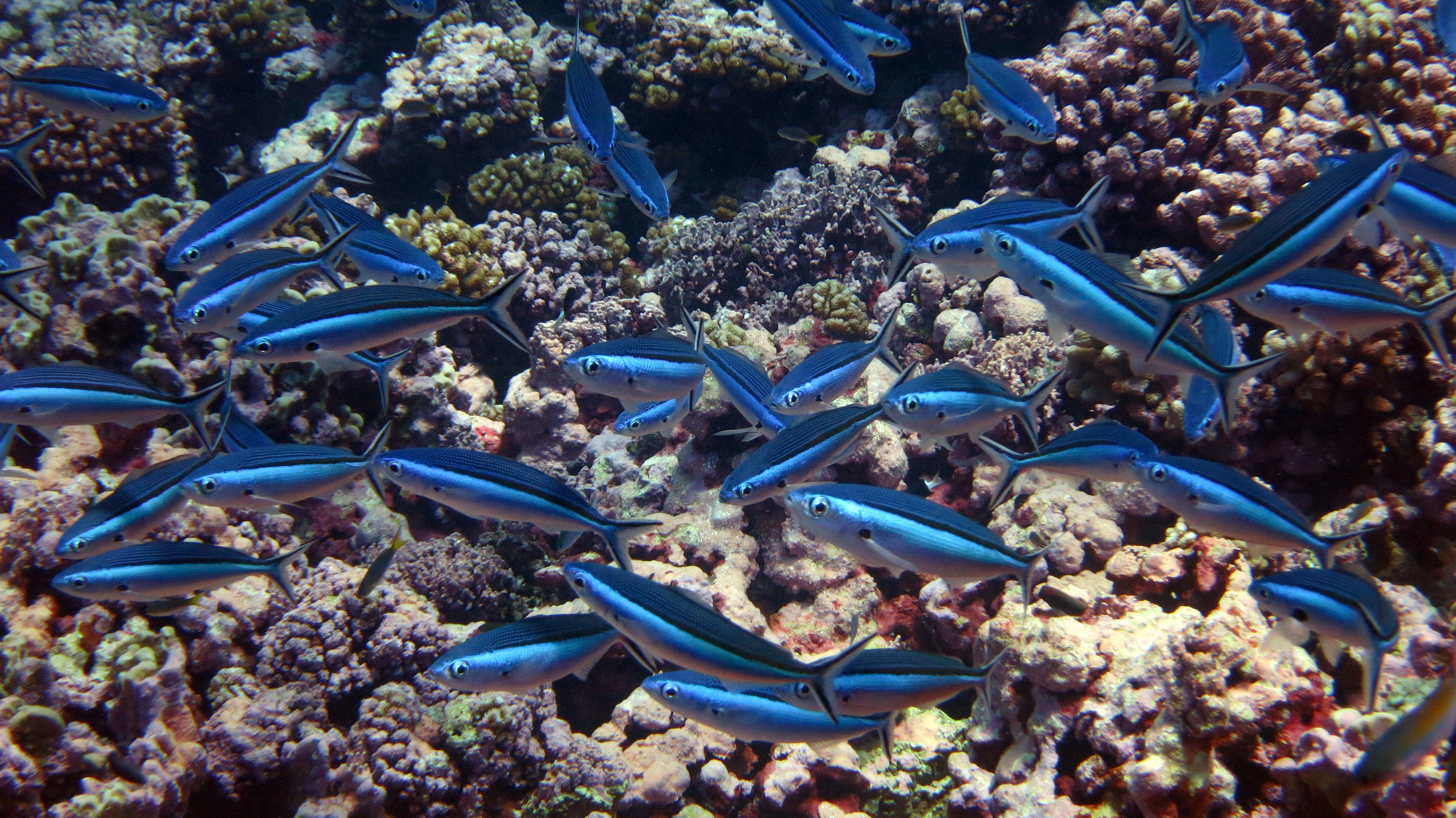
At Jarvis Island

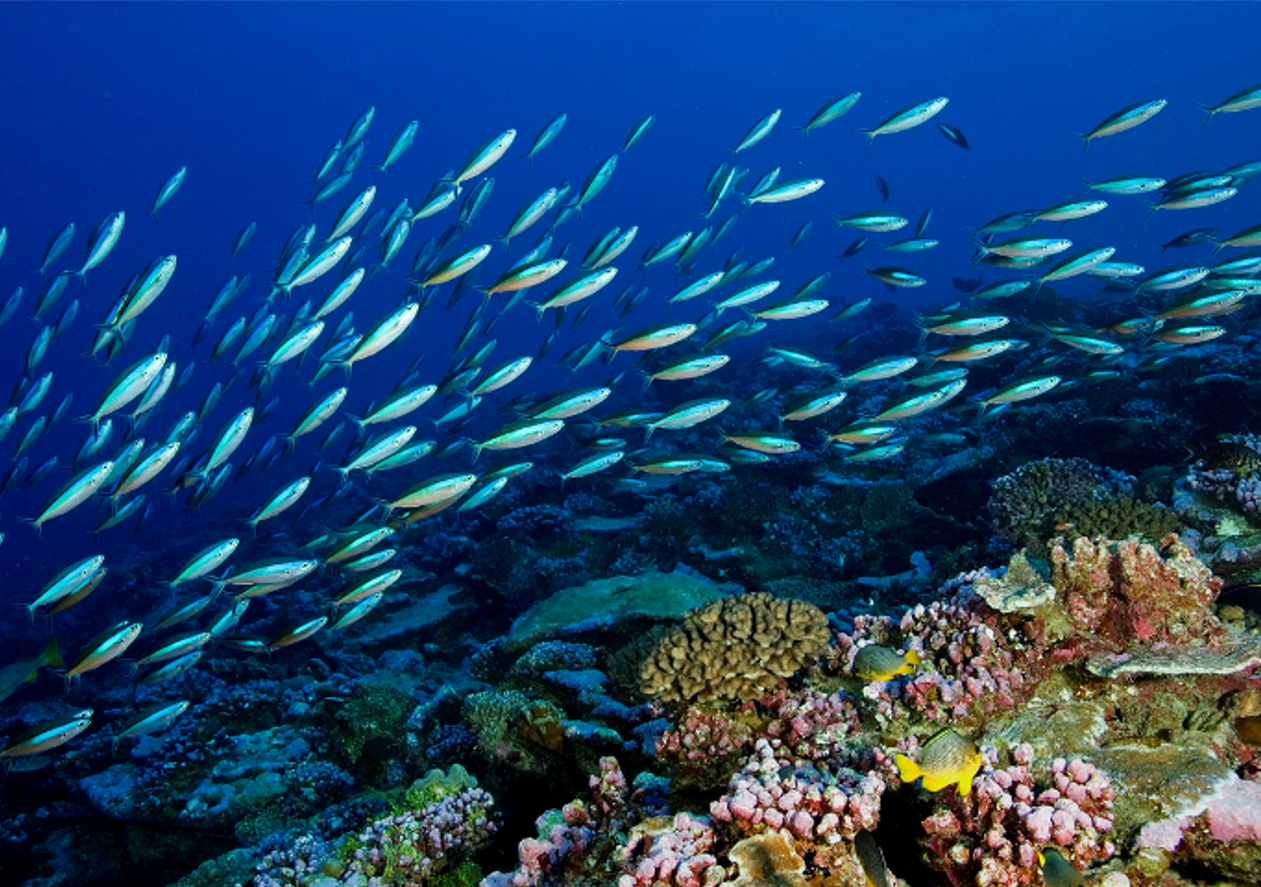
At Palmyra Atoll
