= Taiwanese fried chicken =

Dish in Taiwanese cuisine

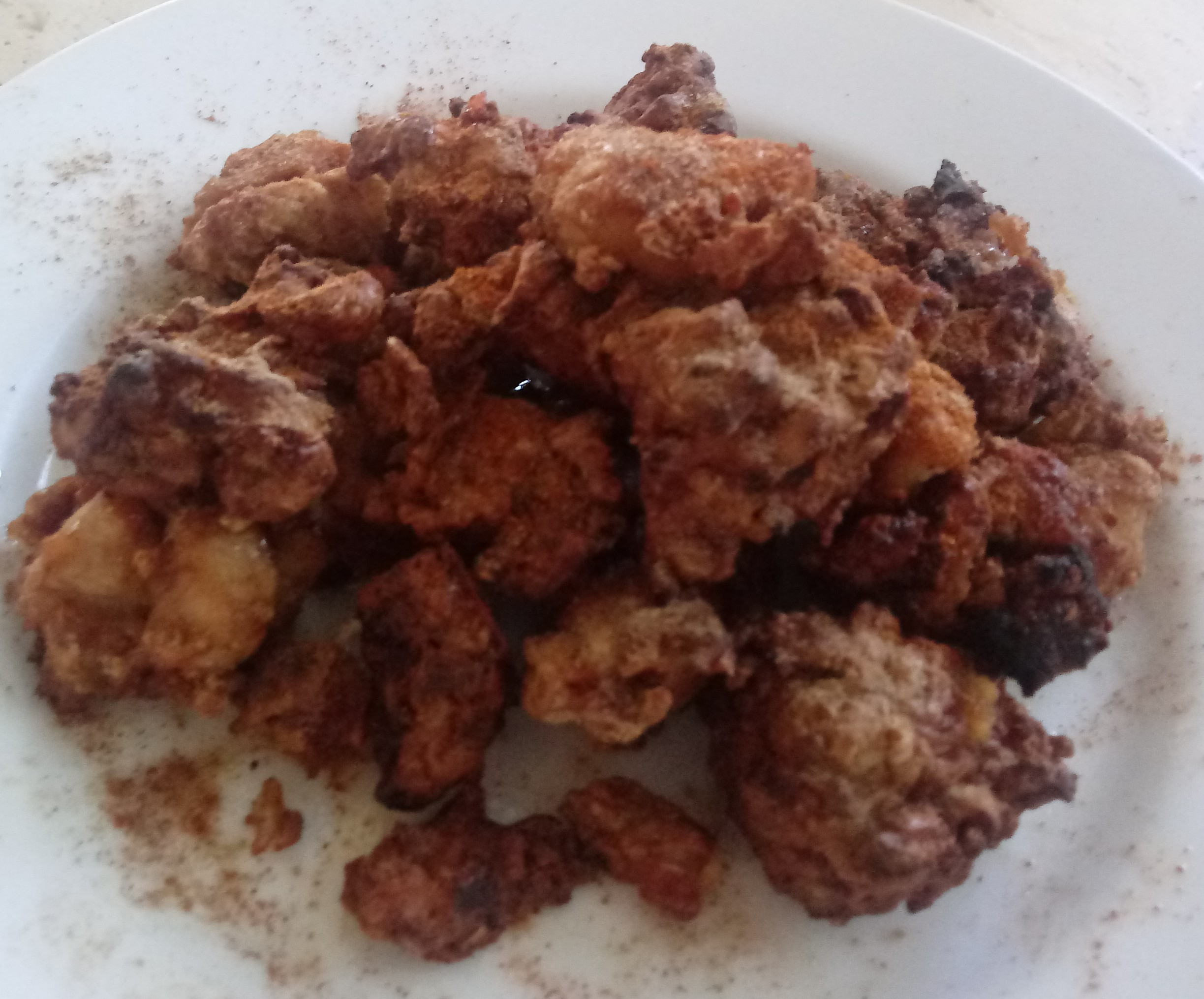
- A plate of homemade Taiwanese fried chicken in California
- Place of origin: Taiwan
- Serving temperature: Hot
- Main ingredients: Chicken, salt, white pepper, Chinese five-spice powder, condiments
- Ingredients generally used: chili powder

Taiwanese fried chicken (Chinese: 鹹酥雞; pinyin: xiánsūjī; Wade–Giles: hsien²su¹chi¹; Pe̍h-ōe-jī: kiâm-so͘-ke; also 鹽酥雞; yánsūjī; 'salty crispy chicken'), westernized as popcorn chicken, is a dish in Taiwanese cuisine commonly found as a street snack. It is popular at the night markets in Taiwan. It consists of bite-sized pieces of chicken, coated and fried with flour and seasoning mixture. Salt and pepper is the staple condiment, while chili powder, lightly fried basil leaves, and garlic bits are added depending on preference.

Since the creation of this dish, it has become a popular fast food or restaurant appetizer in other countries in Asia, as well as among Asian immigrant populations overseas.

== Origins ==
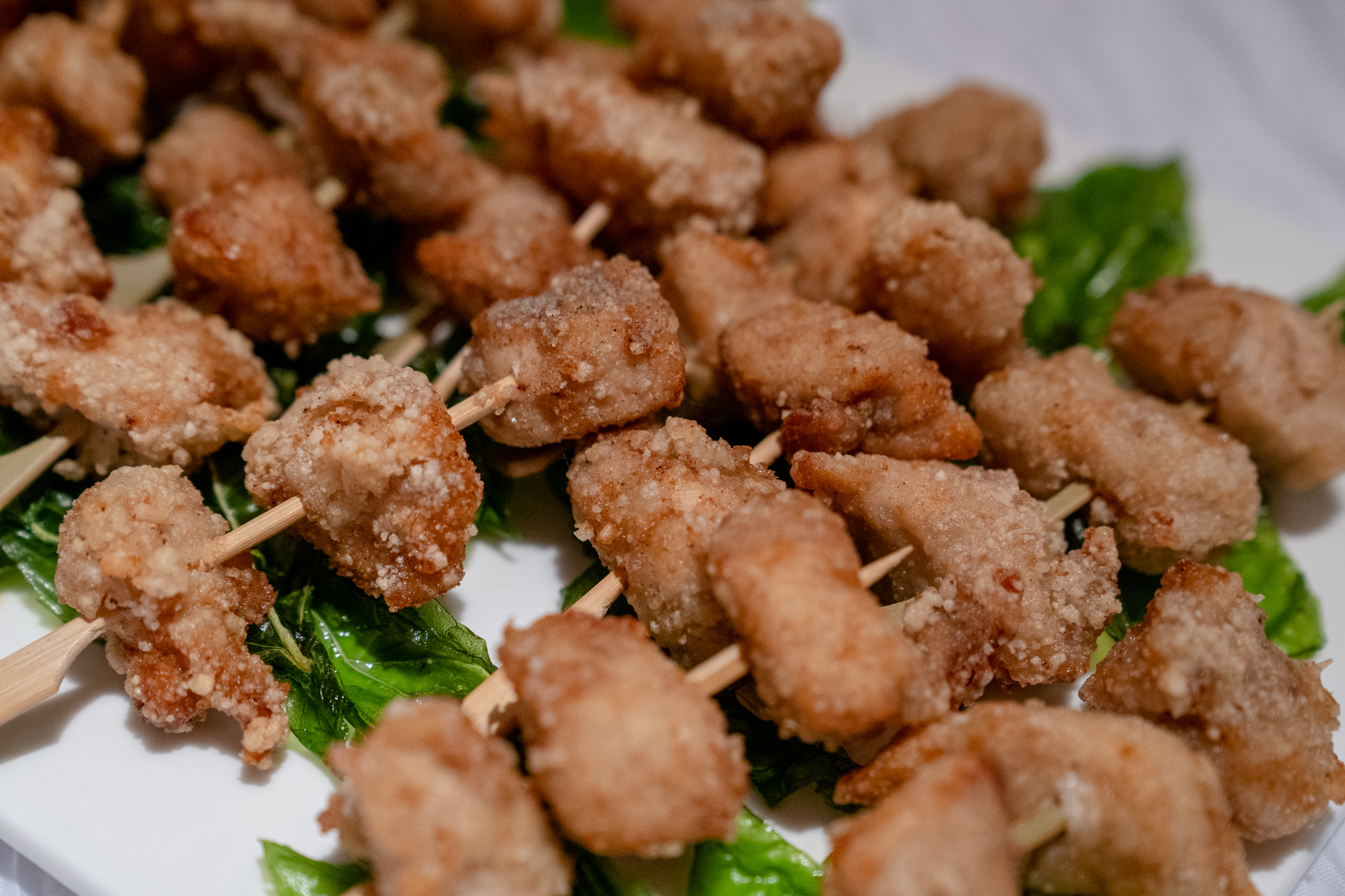
Taiwanese popcorn chicken on skewers

Taiwanese fried chicken is famous for its taste and texture. The dish's history is relatively recent. It evolved rapidly due to stiff competition, and many different varieties have been made. In the early stages of the dish, the fried chicken was merely combined with different levels of chili powder to separate into mild, medium, and extra spicy flavors. Different varieties of the dish change according to trends and use a wide variety of seasonings, such as allspice, seaweed powder, and mustard powder, among many others. Some versions are covered in honey, or filled with cheese, or subject to any number of different preparations.

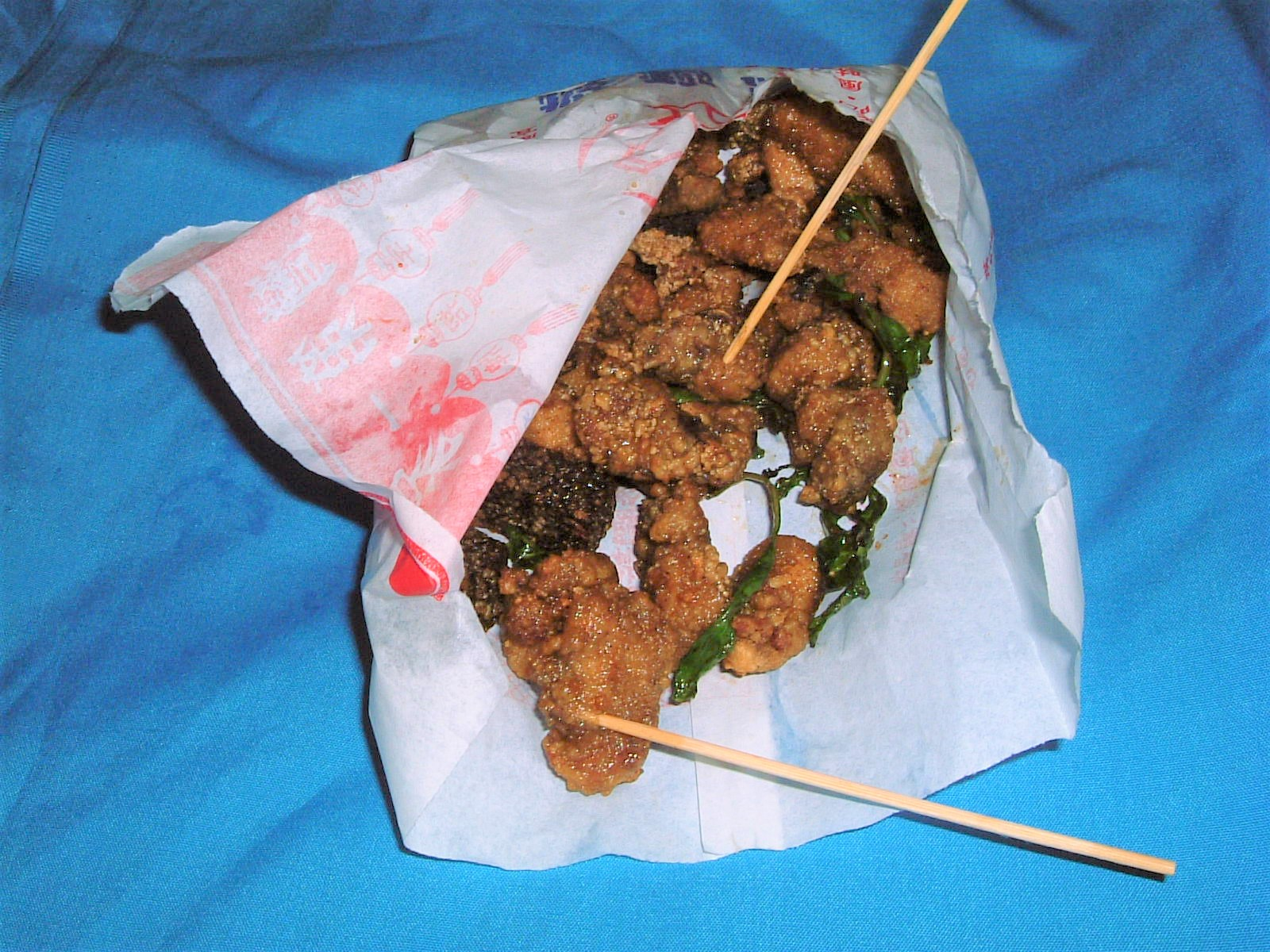
Sold as street food

Rather than being fried in just one pot of oil, it uses two pots of oil with different temperatures in order to optimize the crunchy texture and taste. Some vendors grill the chicken first, then fry it for extra crunch. It uses high-temperature oils to lock in the natural juices of the meat, followed by low temperature oils to complete the cooking process and ensure food safety. Using this method can eliminate common problems, such as chicken that is either not fully cooked or overcooked leading to loss of juiciness and a dry texture. Frying the chickens with one pot of oil often results in a thick layer of fried breading and thin layer of meat, while using two pots can prevent this from happening.

Some vendors fry the dish using the subcutaneous layer of fat on the chicken, which can make improve the fragrance and reduce greasiness in the final product. However, the cost of this method is high, which why it is less common.

== Traditional preparation ==
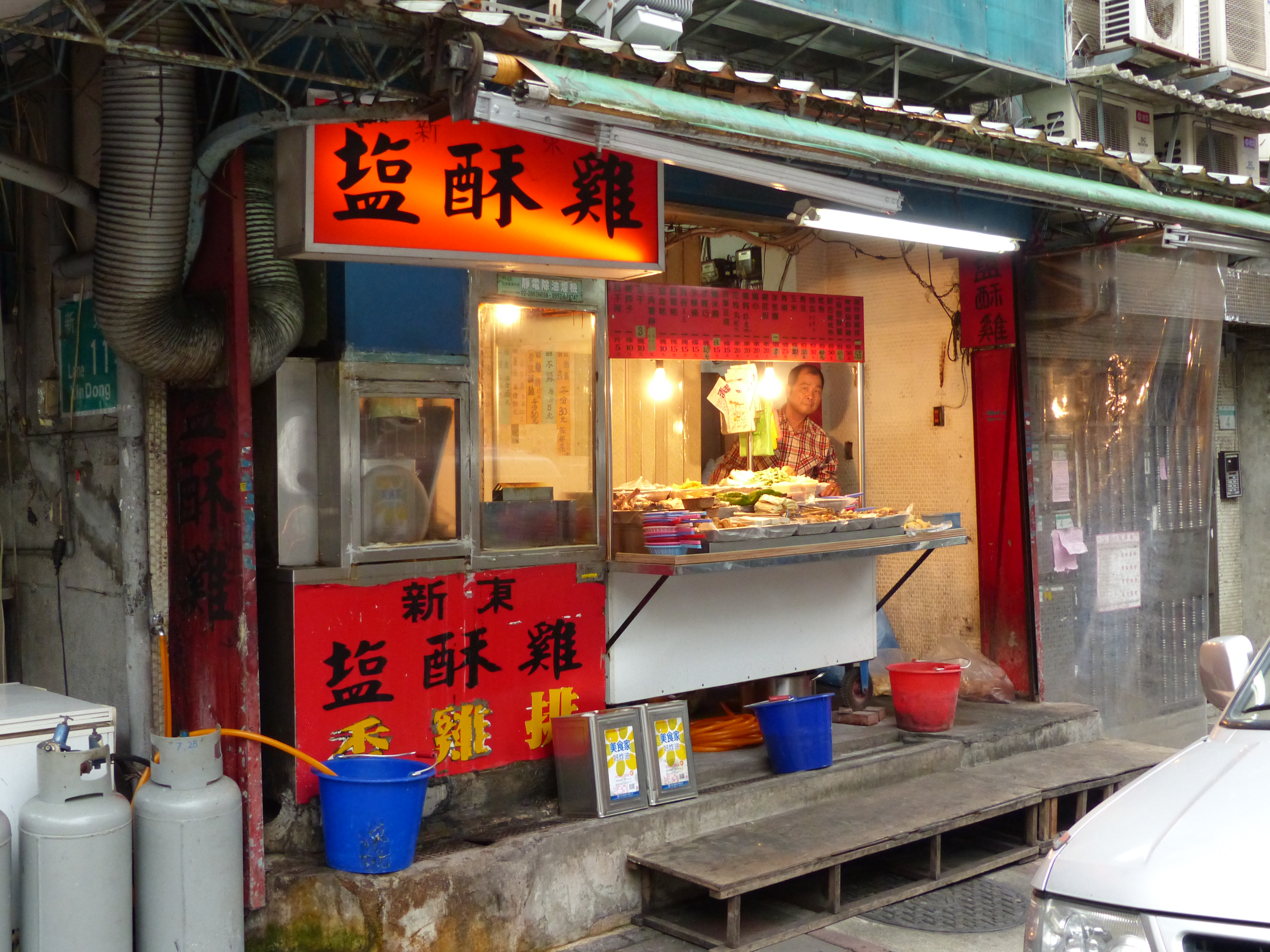
Yansuji stall in Taipei

In general, only diced chicken leg or thigh meat is used, which is marinated in soy sauce, sugar, garlic spread, rice wine, five-spice powder and other spices for at least an hour. After marinating, chicken is dipped in beaten egg and then dredged in flour or sweet potato starch. The chicken pieces are deep-fried until the surface color turns soft yellow. Traditionally, after the chicken is fried, more pepper is added before eating.

== Popularity ==
=== Hong Kong ===
Hong Kong and Taiwan have close ties and people travel a lot between the two, hence the products have long been well known among Hong Kongers, resulting in the country being a major market for the chicken. For this reason, many strive to serve Hong Kong customers authentic Taiwanese fried chicken using high-quality ingredients. There are some famous brands selling Taiwanese food in Hong Kong, such as Hot Star Large Fried Chicken. Ji Guang opened its first store in Hong Kong as part of an Asia expansion plan. In 2016, Hot Star Large Fried Chicken had the largest market share of this industry, with 15 branches.

=== United States ===
Taiwanese fried chicken, and Taiwanese cuisine in general, has grown increasingly popular in the United States.

== See also ==
- Barbecue chicken
- Karaage
- Taiwanese fried chicken cutlet
