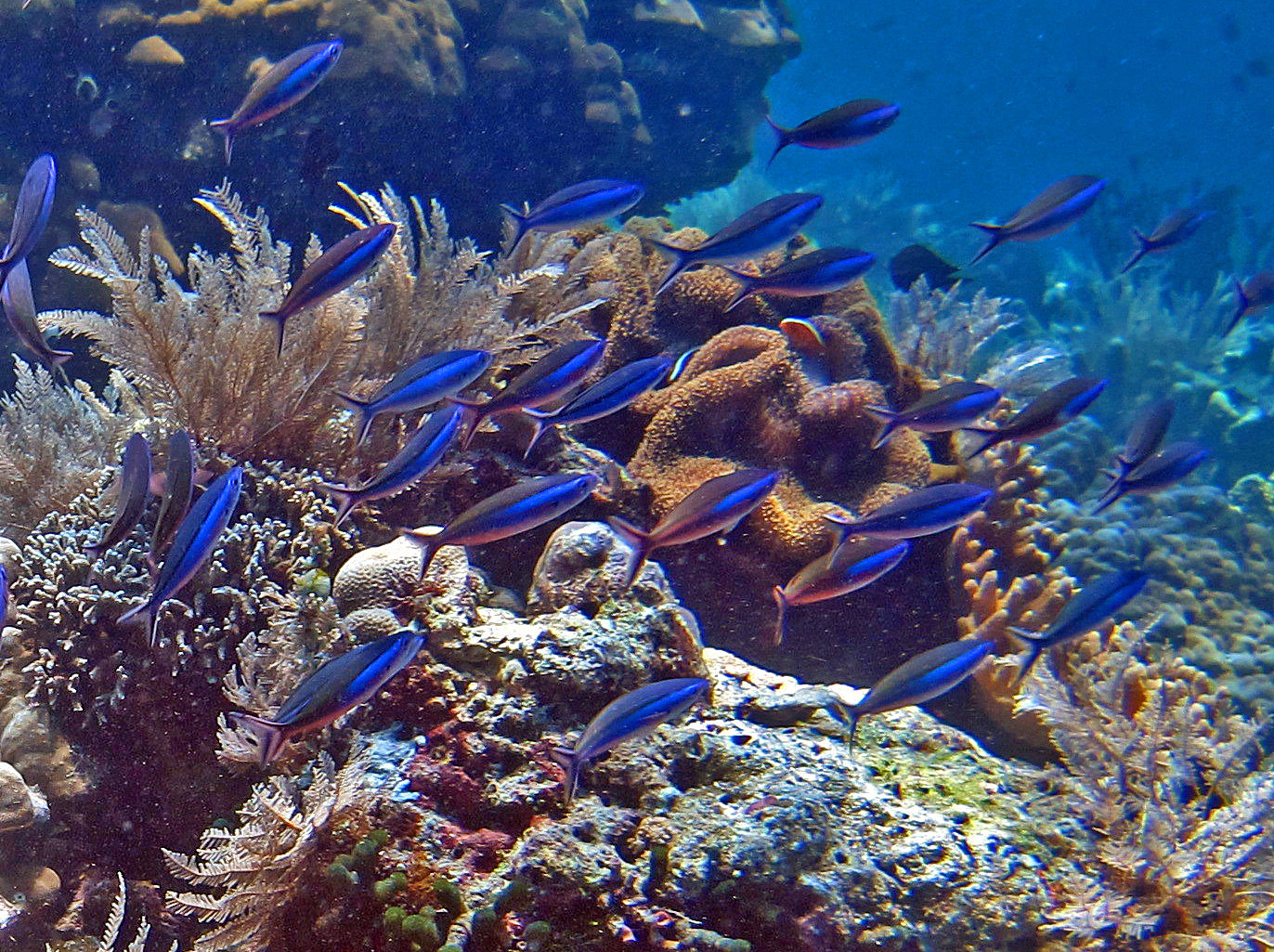
- Pterocaesio tile at Bunaken, Sulawesi

Scientific classification
- Kingdom: Animalia
- Phylum: Chordata
- Class: Actinopterygii
- Order: Acanthuriformes
- Family: Lutjanidae
- Subfamily: Lutjaninae
- Genus: Pterocaesio; Bleeker, 1876

Type species
- Caesio multiradiatus Steindachner, 1861

Synonyms
- Clupeolabrus Nichols, 1923; Liocaesio Bleeker, 1876; Pisinnicaesio Carpenter, 1987; Squamosicaesio Carpenter, 1987

= Pterocaesio =

Genus of ray-finned fishes

Pterocaesio is a genus of marine ray-finned fish, fusiliers belonging to the family Lutjanidae. They are native to the Indian Ocean and the western Pacific Ocean.

== Taxonomy ==
Pterocaesio was described as a genus in 1876 by the Dutch ichthyologist Pieter Bleeker with Franz Steindachner's Caesio multiradiatus as the type species. This taxon was subsequently shown to be a synonym of Caesio tile which had been described by Georges Cuvier in 1830. The generic name is a compound of ptero meaning "fin" and the genus name Caesio. Bleeker did not give an explanation of his name but it may be because the type species P. tile has a higher number of rays in the dorsal fin. 21, compared to 13-18 in Caesio. Three subgenera have been proposed for Pteroceasio.

=== Species ===
Currently, 12 species in this genus are recognized, and have been divided into subgenera by some authorities as follows:

- Subgenus Pterocaesio
  - Pterocaesio tile (Cuvier, 1830) (dark-banded fusilier)
- Subgenus Pisinnicaesio Carpenter 1987
  - Pterocaesio chrysozona (Cuvier], 1830) (goldband fusilier)
  - Pterocaesio digramma (Bleeker, 1864) (double-lined fusilier)
  - Pterocaesio pisang (Bleeker, 1853) (banana fusilier)

Subgenus Squamosicaesio Carpenter 1987

  - Pterocaesio capricornis J. L. B. Smith & M. M. Smith, 1963 (capricorn fusilier)
  - Pterocaesio flavifasciata G. R. Allen & Erdmann, 2006 (yellowstripe fusilier)
  - Pterocaesio lativittata Carpenter, 1987 (wide-band fusilier)
  - Pterocaesio marri L. P. Schultz, 1953 (Marr's fusilier)
  - Pterocaesio monikae G. R. Allen & Erdmann, 2008 (Cenderawasih fusilier)
  - Pterocaesio randalli Carpenter, 1987 (Randall's fusilier)
  - Pterocaesio tessellata Carpenter, 1987 (one-stripe fusilier)
  - Pterocaesio trilineata Carpenter, 1987 (three-stripe fusilier)

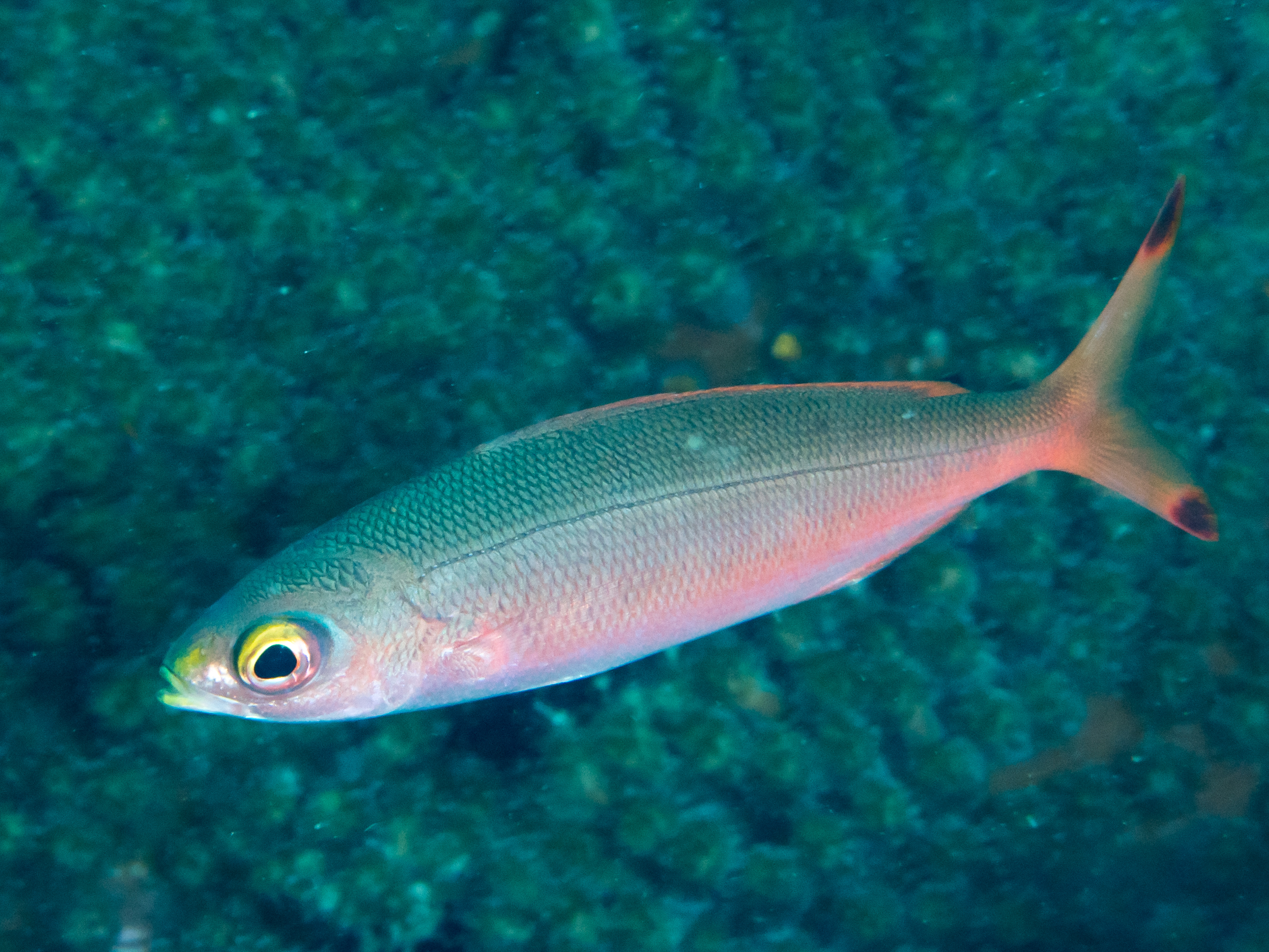
Banana fusilier (Pterocaesio pisang)

== Characteristics ==
Pterocaesio fusiliers are characterised by having fusiform, elongated bodies which show moderate lateral compression. There are small conical teeth in the jaws and there may, or may not, be similar teeth in the vomer and palatines. The margin of the gill cover forms a flap near its top. The dorsal fin is continuous and has 10 or 11 spines and 14-16 soft rays, in some species this is 10-12 spines and 19-22 soft rays. The anal fin has 3 spines and 11-13 soft rays and the pectoral fin rays number 17-24. The flanks may be unmarked, there may be one or more horizontal stripes or they can show a large blotch over the base of the pectoral fin. The caudal fin can have black tips to the lobes or a dark streak in the middle of each lobe.

== Distribution and habitat ==
Pterocaesio fusiliers are found in coastal waters of the Indo-West Pacific, although they are absent from the Persian Gulf and the northern Arabian Sea, mainly remaining in the vicinity of coral reefs.

== Biology ==
Pterocaesio fusiliers are schooling fishes, often joining in mixed species schools with congeners and with slender fusiliers (Gymnocaesio gymnoptera). These school forage in midwater for zooplankton. Their strategy for reproduction is characterised by apparently attaining sexual maturity at a young age, high fertility and an extended spawning season. They gather in large aggregations to spawn and the timing of the aggregations is governed by the lunar cycle.

== Fisheries ==
Pterocaesio fusiliers are not very important food fish. Where fisheries land them they are caught using drive-in nets, gill nets, traps, by trawling and handlining. The landed fish are sold fresh and preserved as salt fish. Tuna fisheries may catch numbers of both juveniles and adults of some species to use as bait. baitfish for tuna fisheries.
