= Chicken tatsuta =

Japanese McDonald's burger

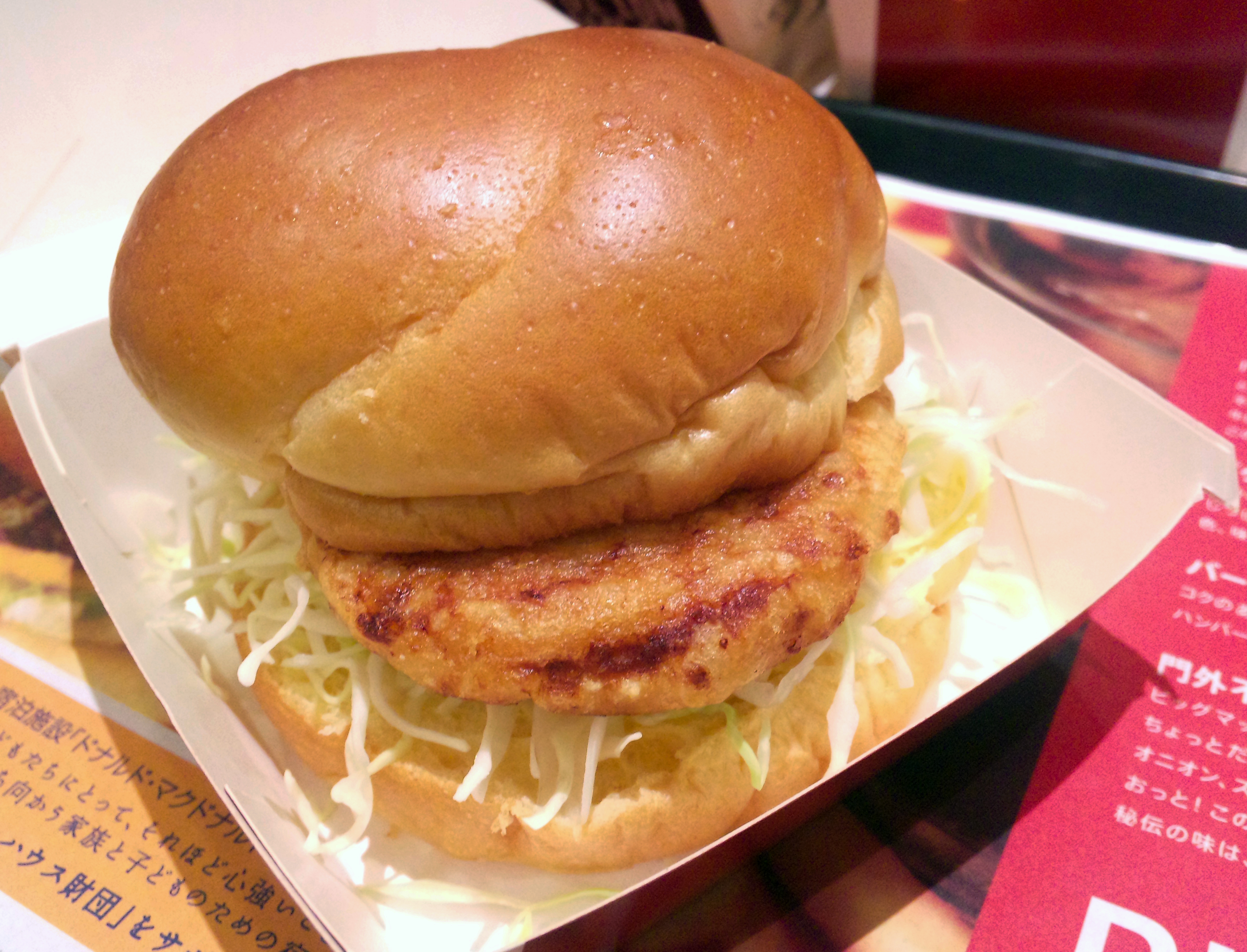
Chicken tatsuta

Chicken tatsuta (チキン タツタ, chikin-tatsuta) is a Japanese-style fried chicken burger trademarked by McDonald's Japan.

Tatsuta-age is a type of karaage. The chicken is marinated then sprinkled with Japanese katakuri-ko (potato starch) before frying.

== See also ==
- Tonkatsu
- Japanese cuisine
- Fried chicken
