= Karaage =

Japanese cooking technique

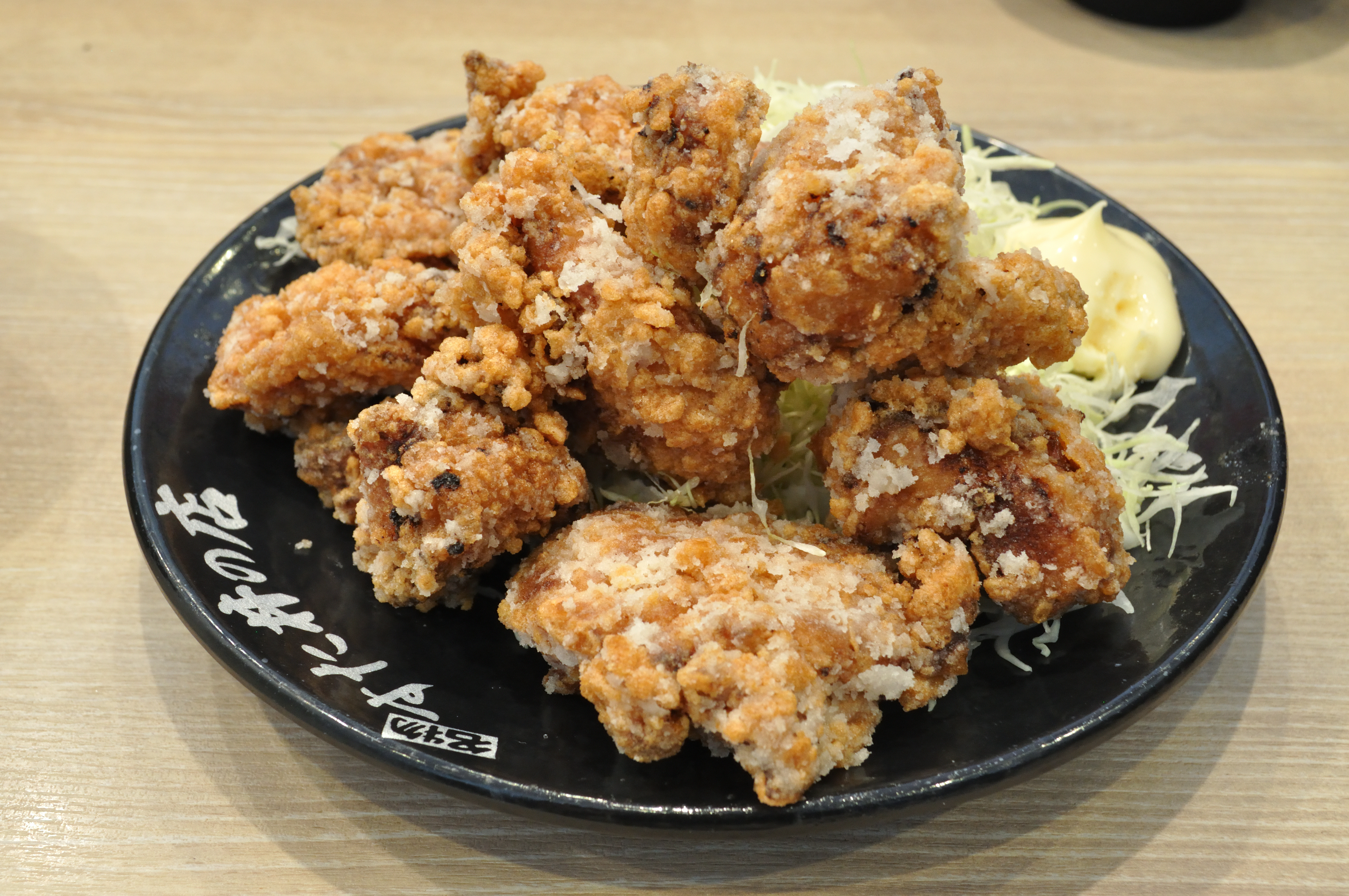
Chicken karaage

Karaage (唐揚げ, 空揚げ, or から揚げ, karaage; [kaɾaːɡe] lit. 'Chinese deep-fry') is a Japanese cooking technique in which small pieces of meat or fish are marinated, dredged with a starch, and deep fried in oil. The usual meat is chicken, but may also be other meats, fish, or tofu. Karaage may be served alone or with rice and shredded cabbage.

The marinade typically includes sake, soy sauce, ginger juice, and scallions.

The process is different from other Japanese frying techniques, which do not marinate the food: su-age 'naked fry' is not coated with starch or batter; koromo-age 'batter fry', the technique used for tempura, uses a batter.

== Name ==
Kara-age means "Chinese frying", but kara means "empty" when spelled with the kanji 空, so the name is often thought of as "dry frying", that is, without batter. There exists considerable disagreement among newspapers and publishers in Japan about the preferred kanji, leading some to write it phonetically as からあげ.

The chicken version may be called tatsuta-age (竜田揚げ) or more specifically toriniku tatsuta-age (鶏肉竜田揚げ). Some consider them to be distinct dishes. McDonald's Japan offers a tatsuta sandwich (チキン タツタ).

== History ==
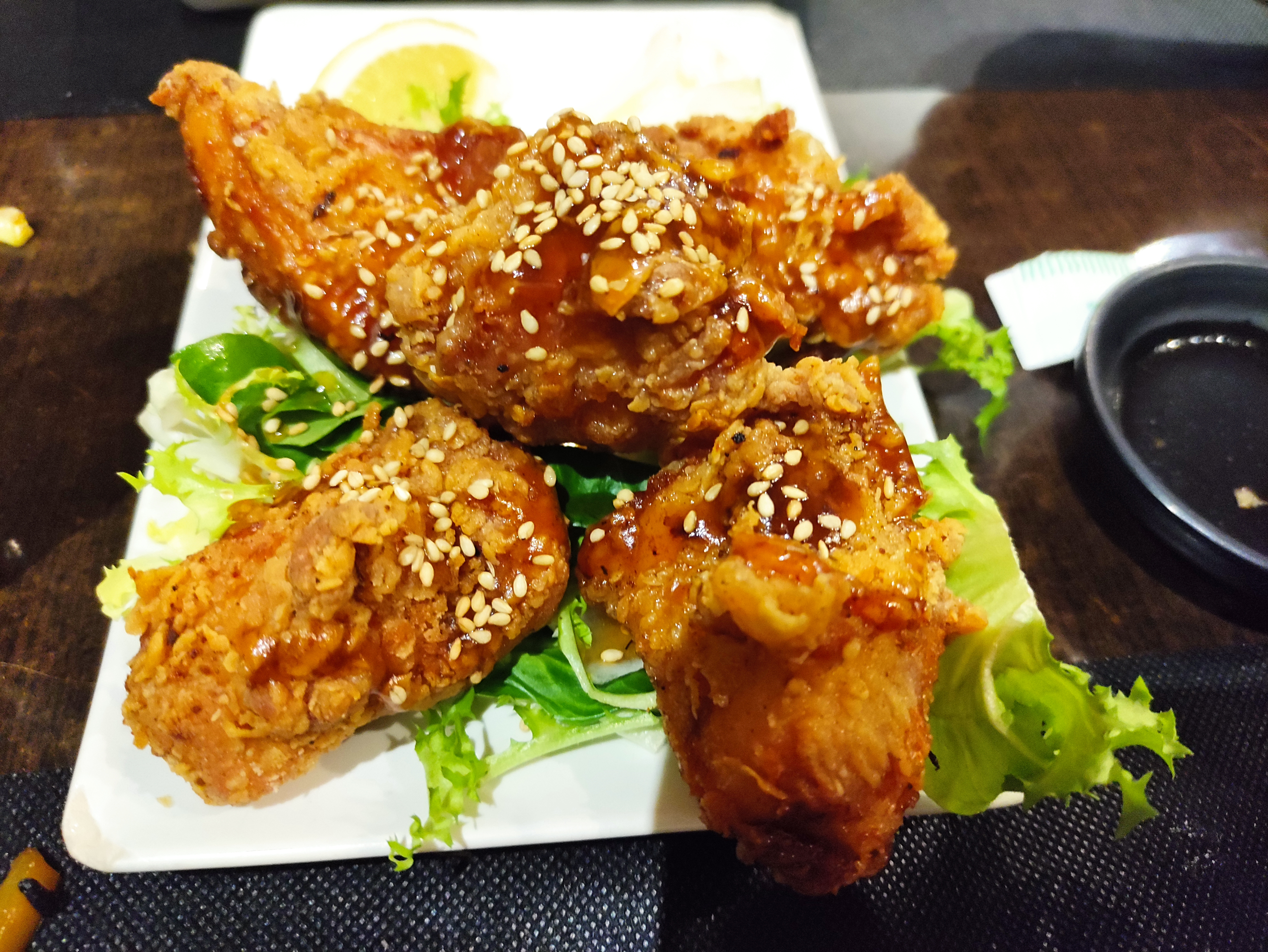
Chicken karaage with white sesame

The first references to a style of frying called karaage (then written as 空揚) were in the Genroku period at the end of the 17th century. Chicken karaage was popularized as a "Chinese-style" restaurant food (using the characters 唐揚, where 唐 means Tang) in the 1930s.

Karaage by itself usually refers to the chicken version, the most common application of karaage cooking style since making it at home became more popular after World War II. The post-war increase in the popularity of karaage is said to have begun in Ōita Prefecture in neighboring cities Usa and Nakatsu. At the annual Karaage Festival in Nakatsu, over 60 different shops participate to provide unique versions of the dish. Shops which advertise "Nakatsu karaage" can be found throughout Japan.

In Japan, chicken karaage is commonly available in convenience stores such as Lawson, FamilyMart, and 7-Eleven as a fast-food item. It is also readily available in food stands throughout Japan.

== Regional karaage ==
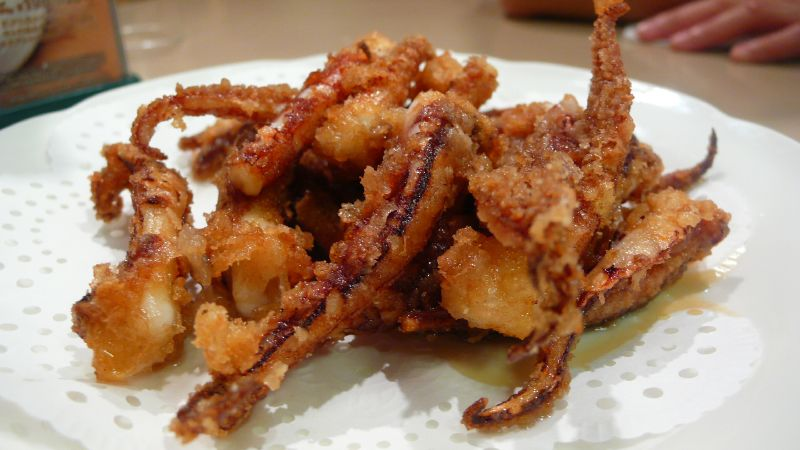
Geso (squid tentacle) karaage

Since karaage has spread throughout Japan, there have been many regional takes on the dish, the most notable ones including:

- Zangi – Hokkaido prefecture's version of karaage, made with a marinade and served with a spicy dipping sauce.
- Tebasaki – Nagoya's version of karaage, made with bone in chicken wings, sprinkled with sesame seeds and basted with a special sauce.
- Chicken nanban – Miyazaki prefecture’s version of karaage, dipped in sweet vinegar and topped with tartar sauce.
- Gurukun no kara-age – Okinawa prefecture’s version of karaage. Gurukun is Okinawa's official and most popular fish, often called a "banana fish" in English; it is a fish fried whole and served with lemon.
- Dakgangjeong – Korea's take on fried chicken, very similar to karaage, but usually made with milk and a sweet/spicy sauce consisting of soy sauce, rice wine, red chili pepper paste, honey, and seasonings.
- Fugu no kara-age – A version of karaage popular in Yamaguchi prefecture. Shimonoseki is known as the capital of fugu and many restaurants serving fugu karaage can be found around the city. The flesh, organs, and bones of the blowfish are deep-fried.
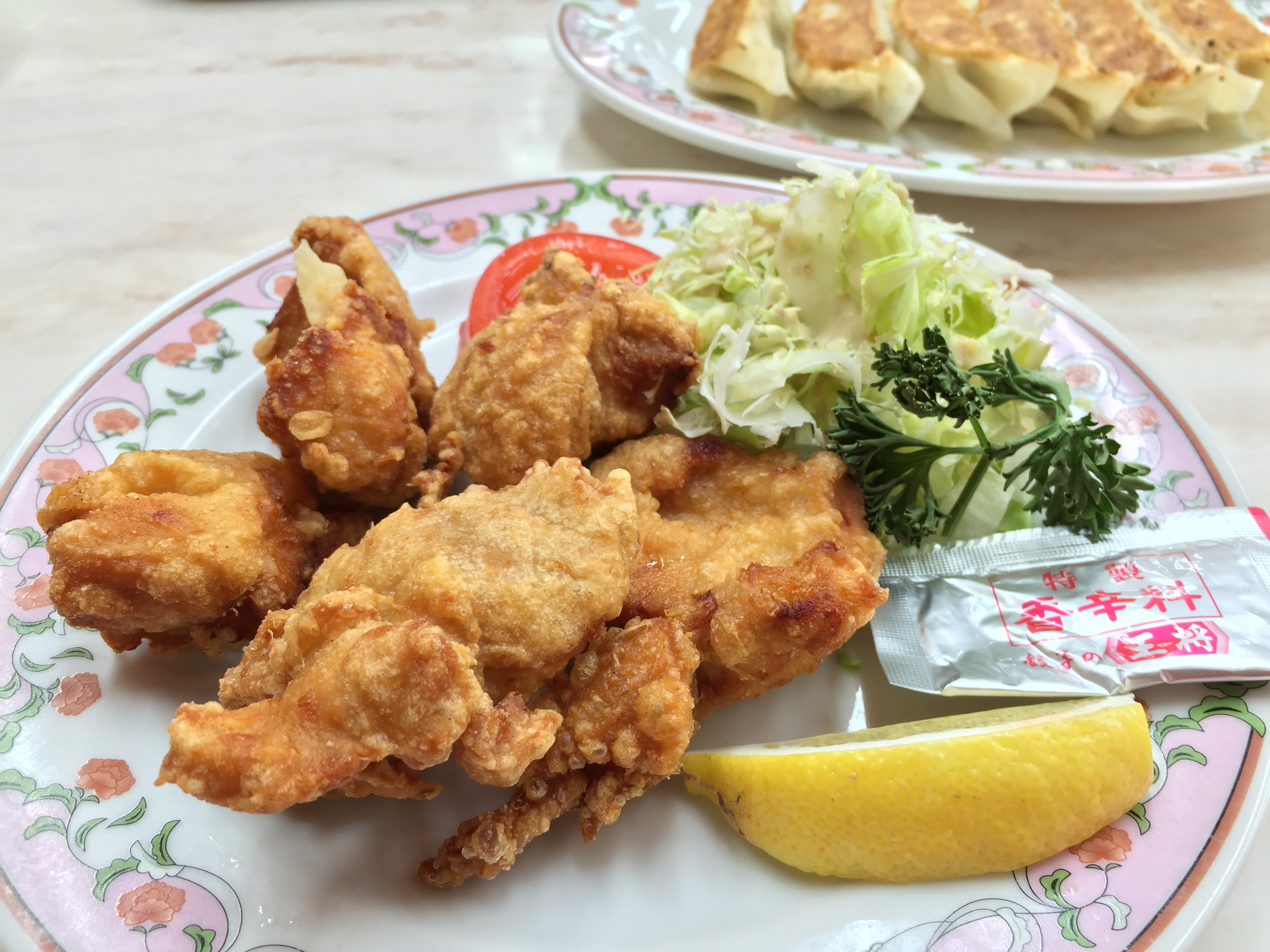
Chicken karaage at Gyoza no Ohsho

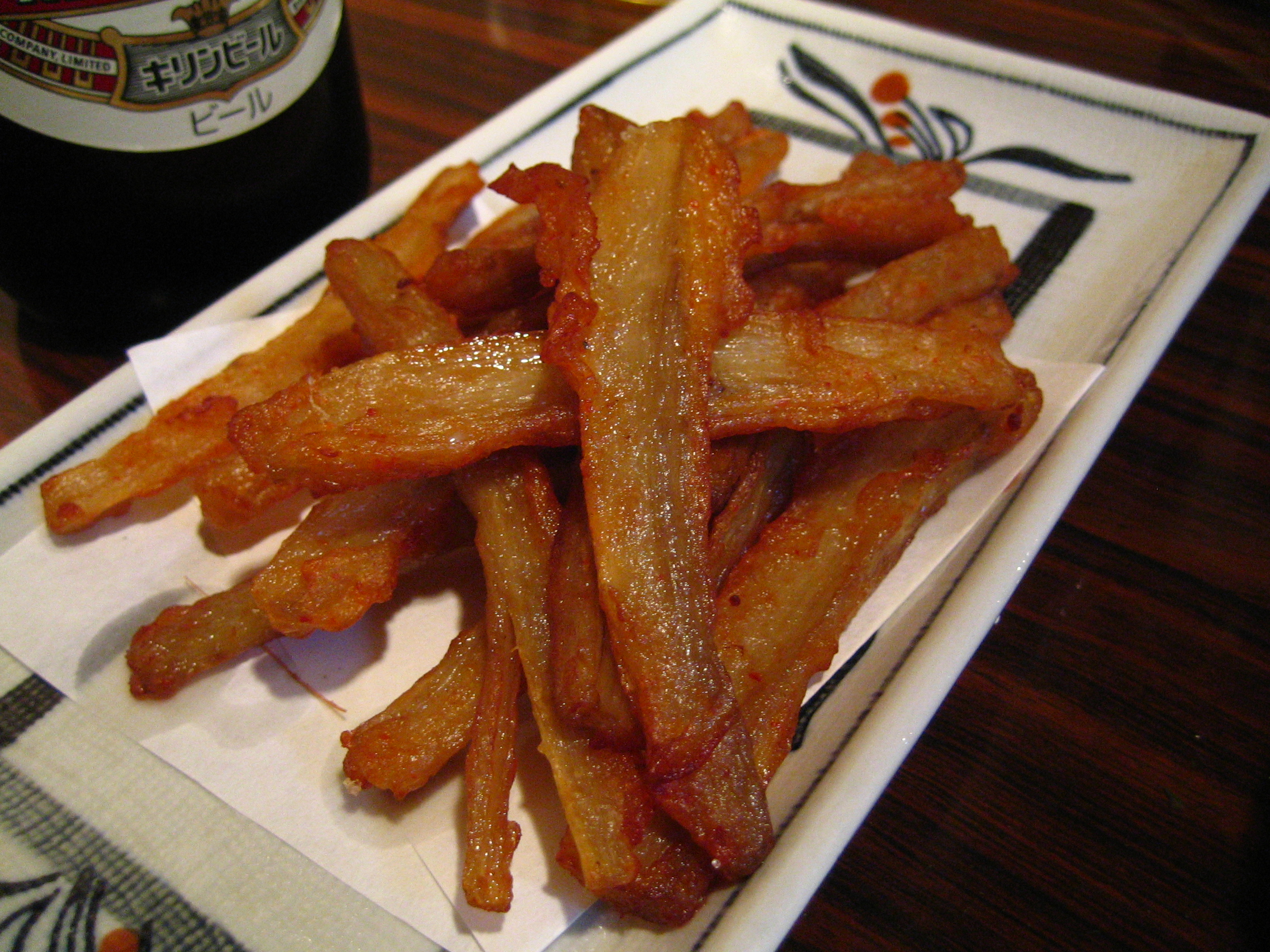
Gobō karaage

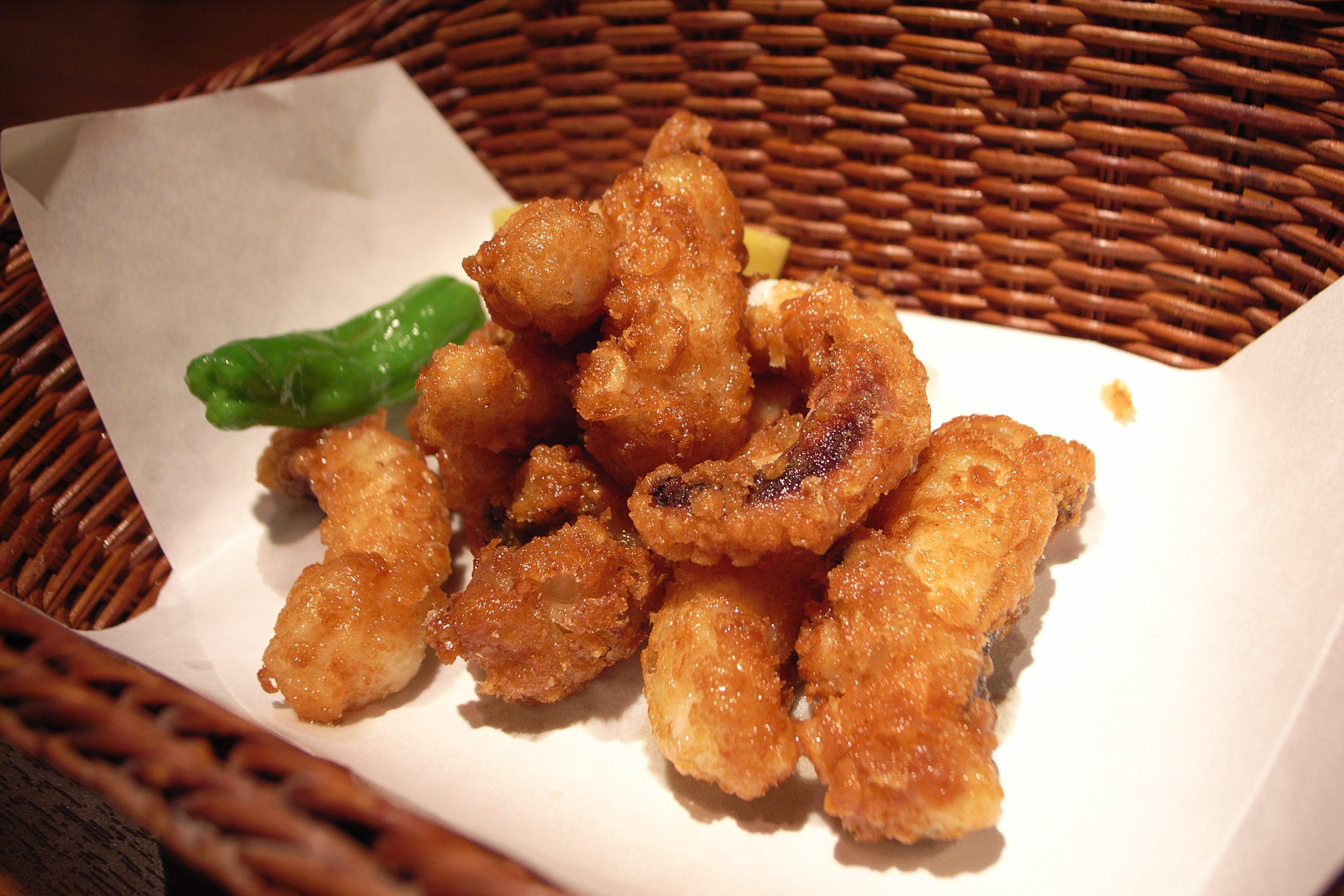
Octopus karaage

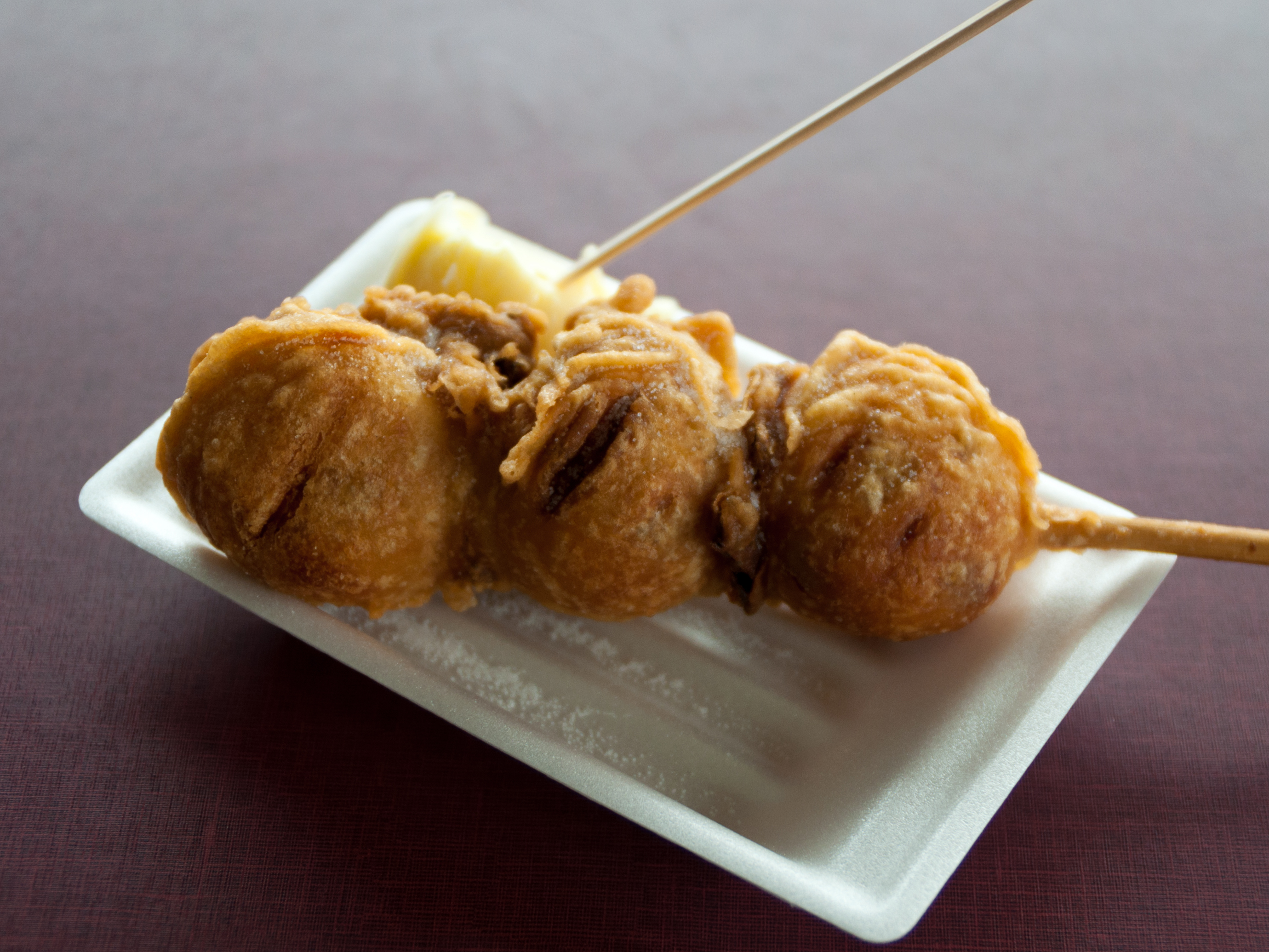
Potato karaage

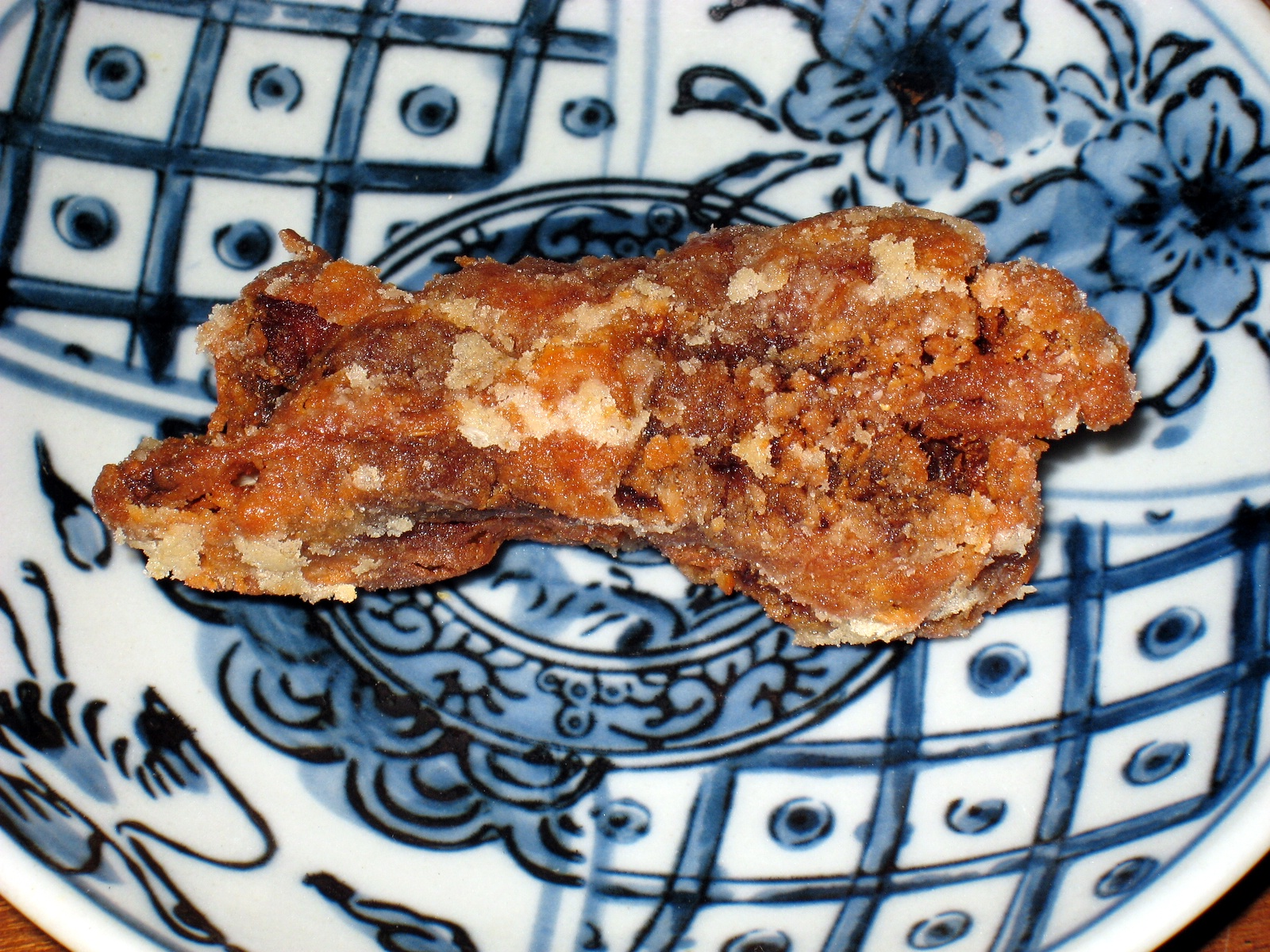
Fugu karaage

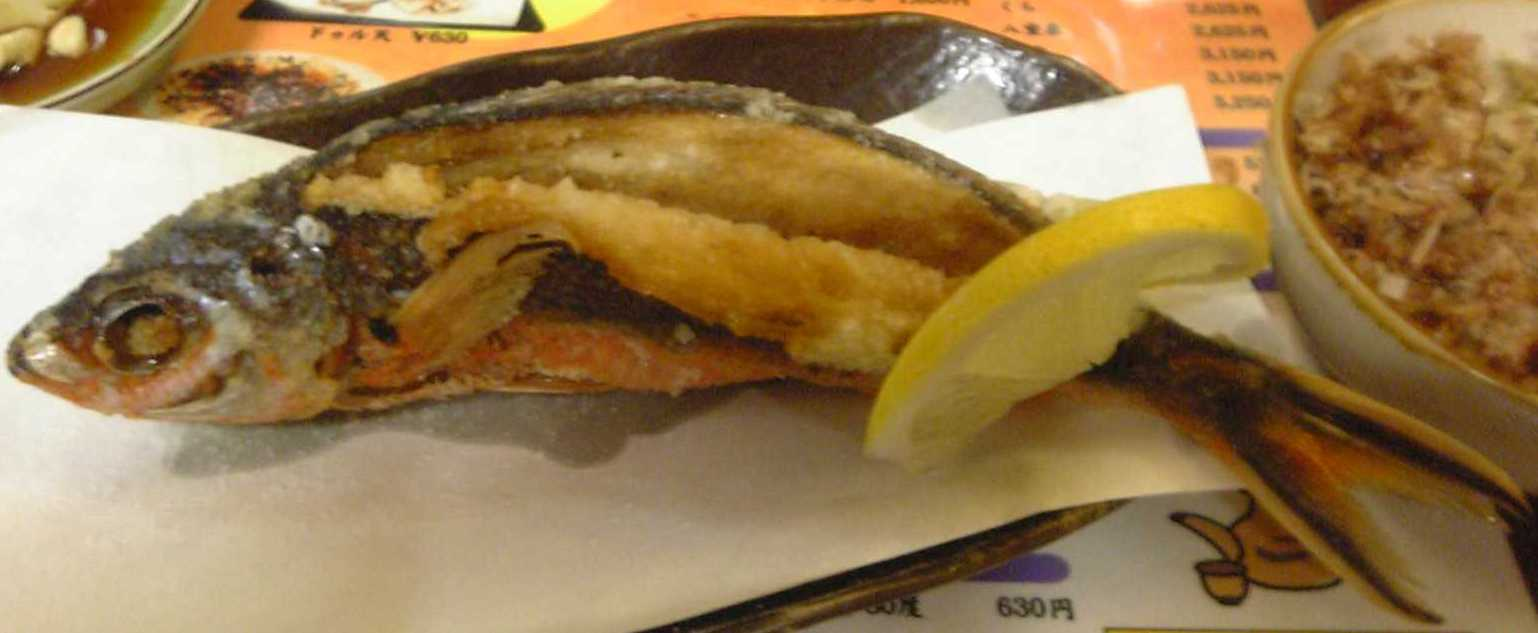
"Bananafish" karaage

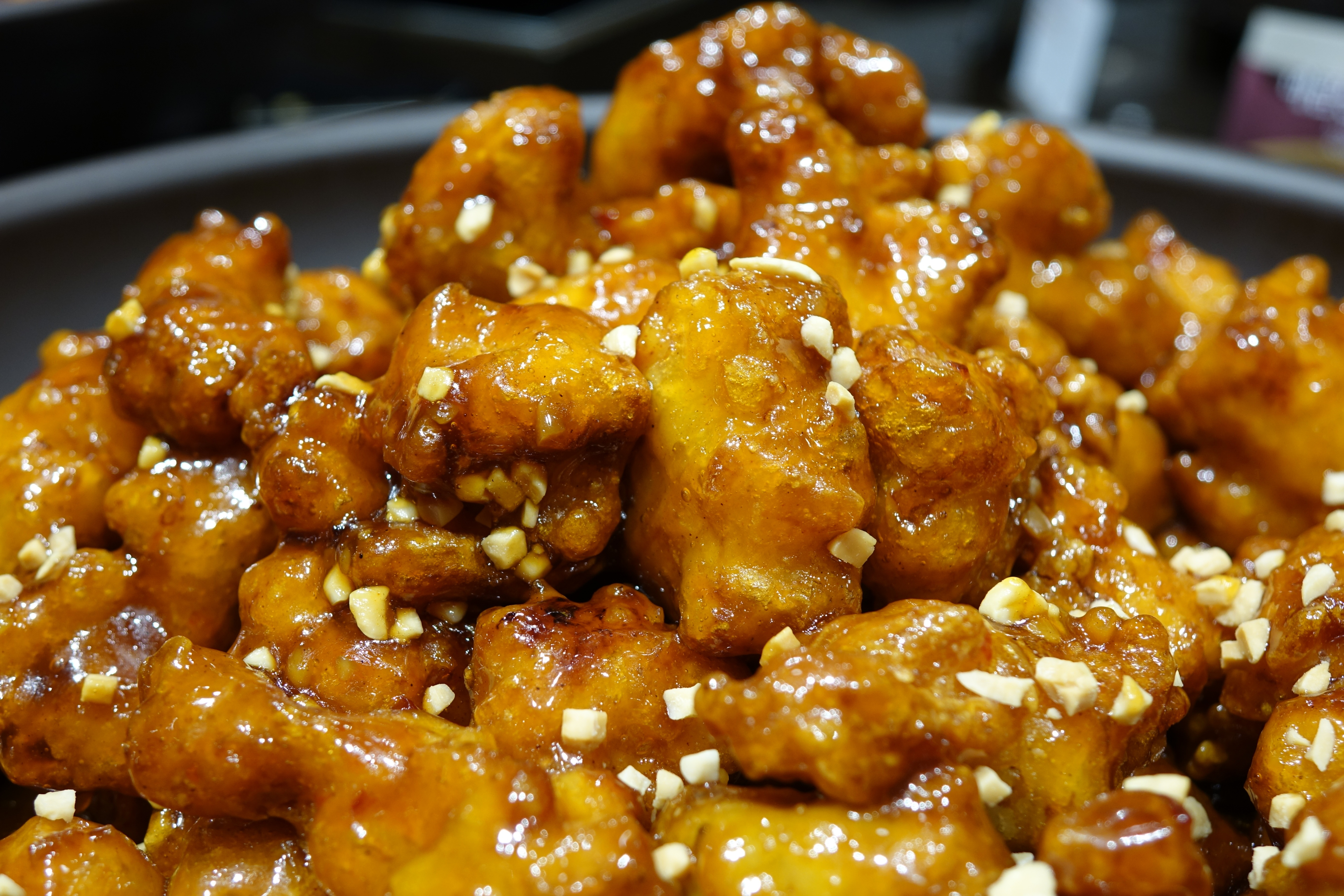
Dakgangjeong, a similar style of fried chicken consumed in Korea

== Karaage in the media ==
- Karaage has become embedded in Japanese cuisine and has made several TV appearances. Probably the most notable appearance has been in the anime/manga series Shokugeki no Soma, a show about a young aspiring chef who sticks to his roots in family restaurant food.
- Another notable mention was by Anthony Bourdain. Bourdain sang praises for the Japanese fried dish in an interview, saying that he always stopped by Lawson to pick up karaage when he visited Japan.
- The dish of the Japan Air Self-Defense Force is deep-fried chicken karaage, such as Okinawan-style deep-fried chicken. It has been used to promote the JASDF.

== See also ==
- Fried chicken
- List of cooking techniques
- List of deep fried foods
- Taiwanese fried chicken
