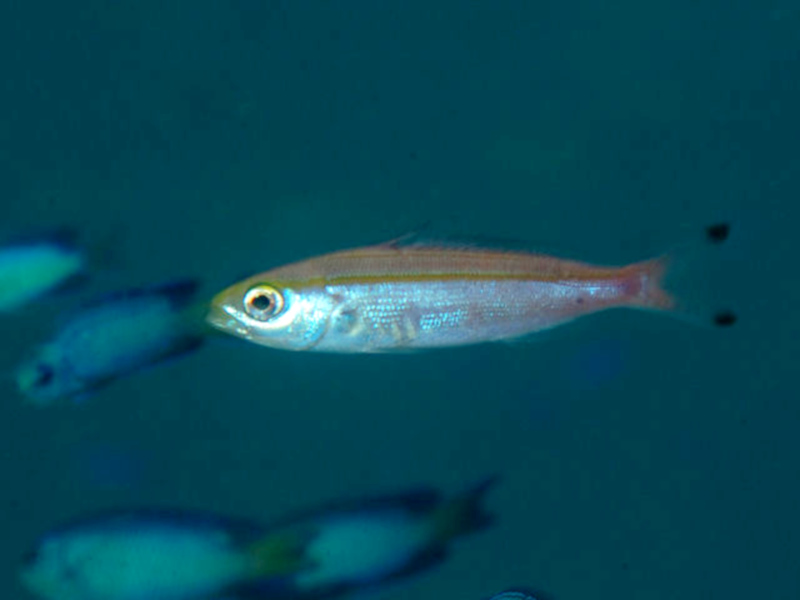

Conservation status
- Least Concern (IUCN 3.1)

Scientific classification
- Kingdom: Animalia
- Phylum: Chordata
- Class: Actinopterygii
- Order: Acanthuriformes
- Family: Lutjanidae
- Genus: Pterocaesio
- Species: P. marri

Binomial name
- Pterocaesio marri Schultz, 1953

Synonyms
- Pterocaesio kohleri Schultz, 1953

= Pterocaesio marri =

Species of fish

Pterocaesio marri, Marr's fusilier, bigtail fusilier, blacktip fusilier, bananafish or twinstripe fusilier is a species of marine ray-finned fish, a fusilier belonging to the family Caesionidae. It is widespread around reefs in the Indo-West Pacific region.

== Taxonomy ==
Pterocaesio marri was first formally described in 1953 by the American ichthyologist Leonard Peter Schultz with the type localities given as a lagoon a quarter mile off Amen Island in Bikini Atoll in the Marshall Islands. In his 1987 review of the Caesionidae, Kent E. Carpenter placed this species within the subgenus Squamosicaesio, of which it is the type species. The specific name honours John C. Marr of the U.S. Fish and Wildlife Service, who had oversight of the commercial fisheries at Bikini Atoll.

== Description ==
Pterocaesio marri has a fusiform and elongated body which is moderately laterally compressed. There are small conical teeth in the jaws but none on the vomer and palatines. The dorsal fin contains 10-11 spines and 14-16 soft rays while the anal fin has 3 spines and 11-13 soft rays. There are scales on both the dorsal and anal fins. There are 2-24 rays in the pectoral fins. This species attains a maximum total length of 35 cm (14 in). The overall colour is blue with dark tips to the lobes of the caudal fin and two thin yellow to brownish stripes along the flanks, the lowest stripe largely running along the lateral line.

== Distribution and habitat ==
Pterocaesio marri has a wide range in the Indo-West Pacific. It is occurs along the coast of East Africa from Somalia south to South Africa, although it is absent from the Red Sea and the Persian Gulf. It is found east across the Indian Ocean into the Pacific Ocean as far east as the Marquesas Islands. It has also been recorded in New Caledonia, Fiji and Tonga and south to the northern Great Barrier Reef of Queensland and the reefs in the Coral Sea, as well as Christmas Island. This species occurs at depths between 1 and 35 m (3 ft 3 in and 114 ft 10 in) on reefs and around oceanic islands.

== Biology ==
Pterocaesio marri forms schools in midwater which forage for zooplankton. They are oviparous laying large numbers of small pelagic eggs.

== Fisheries ==
Pterocaesio marri is subject to heavy fishing pressures in parts of its range, such as the Philippines. Fishers use drive-in nets in western Palawan but it is also taken using gill nets and fish traps in other parts of its range. It is sometimes used by the Indian Ocean and West Pacific tuna fisheries as bait.

== As food ==
Pterocaesio marri is often served as fried fish in Okinawa Prefecture, Japan.
