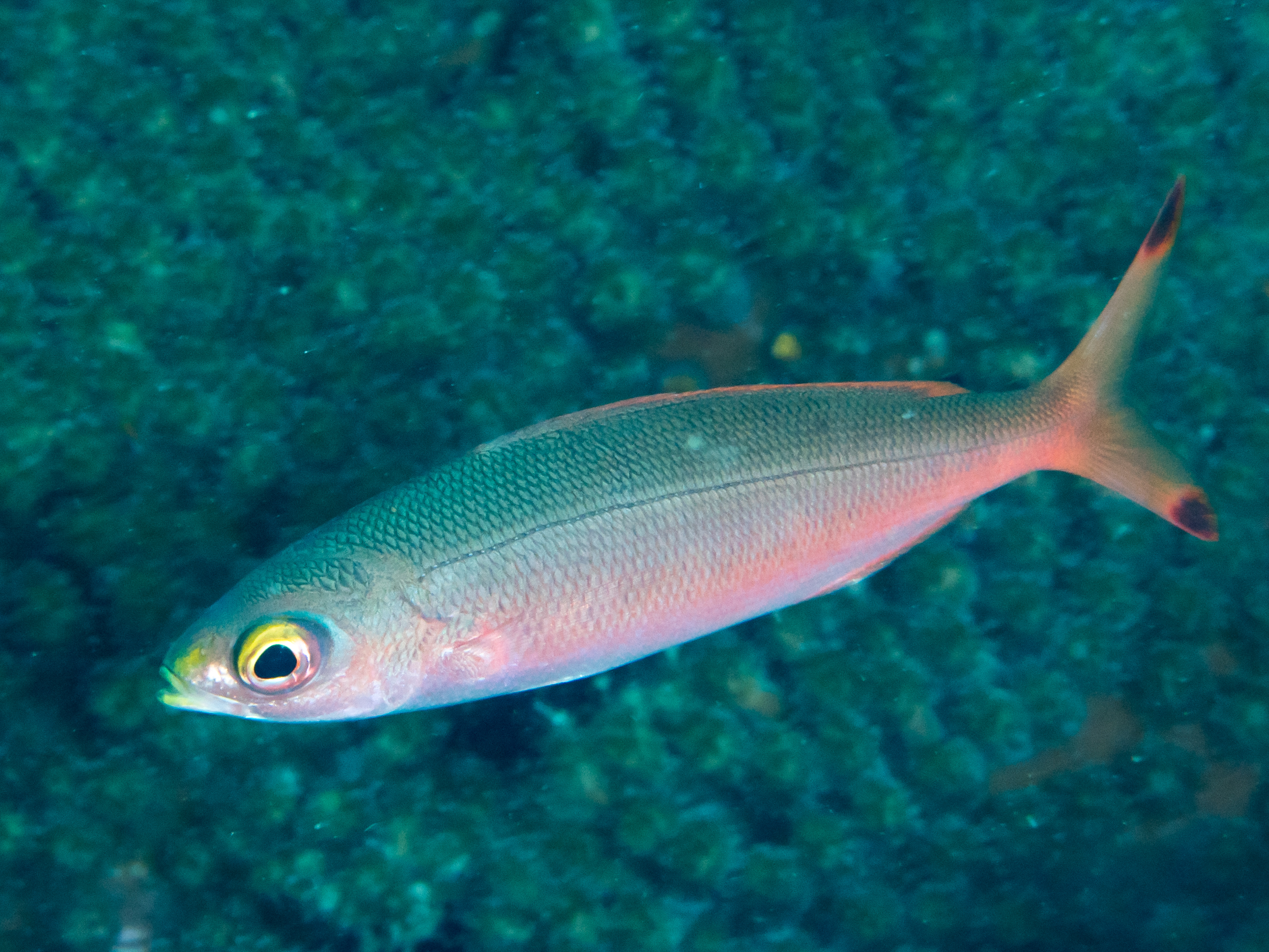

Conservation status
- Least Concern (IUCN 3.1)

Scientific classification
- Kingdom: Animalia
- Phylum: Chordata
- Class: Actinopterygii
- Order: Acanthuriformes
- Family: Lutjanidae
- Genus: Pterocaesio
- Species: P. pisang

Binomial name
- Pterocaesio pisang (Bleeker, 1853)

Synonyms
- Caesio pisang Bleeker, 1853

= Pterocaesio pisang =

Species of fish

Pterocaesio pisang, the banana fusilier or ruddy fusilier, is a species of marine ray-finned fish, a fusilier belonging to the family Caesionidae. It is widespread around reefs in the Indo-West Pacific region.

== Taxonomy ==
Pterocaesio pisang was first formally described as Caesio pisang in 1853 by the Dutch ichthyologist Pieter Bleeker with the type localities given as Ambon Island and Jakarta in Indonesia. In his 1987 review of the Caesionidae, Kent E. Carpenter placed this species within the subgenus Pisinnicaesio. The specific name pisang is derived from the local name for this species in Jakarta, Ikan Pisang pisang, ikan means "fish" and pisang means "banana,", an apparent reference to the shape of this fish.

== Description ==
Pterocaesio pisang has a fusiform and elongated body which is moderately laterally compressed. There are small conical teeth in the jaws and on the vomer and palatines. The dorsal fin contains 10–11 spines and 14–16 soft rays while the anal fin has 3 spines and 11–13 soft rays. There are scales on both the dorsal and anal fins. There are 18–20 rays in the pectoral fins. This species attains a maximum total length of 21 cm (8.3 in). The banana fusilier has a yellowish snout and upper eye, the back and upper flanks are greyish-blue shading to pink on the lower flanks and belly. The tips of the caudal fin lobes are dark red. There are no stripes along its flanks, but there is a clear black lateral line.

== Distribution and habitat ==
Pterocaesio pisang has a wide Indo-Pacific distribution. It is found along the coast of East Africa from southern Somalia to Mozambique, with a seemingly isolated population around Socotra, but it is absent from the Red Sea and the Persian Gulf. In the Pacific it extends east as far as Fiji, north to the Ryukyu Islands south to Australia where it is found from Scott Reef of Western Australia, the Ashmore Reef in the Timor Sea and along the northern Great Barrier Reef as far south as the waters of Tully, Queensland. This species is found at depths between 1 and 100 m (3 ft 3 in and 328 ft 1 in) but are commonest at depths lower than 30 m (98 ft). It occurs around coastal, lagoon and seaward reefs.

== Biology ==
Pterocaesio pisang forms schools, sometimes joining in mixed species schools with congeners. These schools forage for zooplankton in midwater. It is an oviparous species which spawns by laying large numbers of small pelagic eggs.

== Fisheries ==
Pterocaesio pisang may be subjected to heavy pressure from fishing in some parts of its range, such as the Philippines, but elsewhere it is of much less importance to fisheries. It is used as a fish for human consumption in many parts of its range but it is also caught to be used as bait in other fisheries, such as tuna fisheries.
