= Den Fujita =

Japanese businessman (1926–2004)

- Born: March 3, 1926
- Died: April 21, 2004 (aged 78)
- Occupation: Businessman
- Known for: Founder of McDonald's Japan

Den Fujita (藤田 田, Fujita Den, March 3, 1926 – April 21, 2004) was a Japanese businessman. He was the founder of McDonald's Japan.

== Background ==
Fujita was born in Osaka, Japan to a Christian mother and father who worked in a foreign company. Fujita, who was entirely ethnically Japanese, was reared differently from most other Japanese children. With a command of the English language, he served as a translator during high school. However, after World War II, Fujita found his life altered by the death of his father and the destruction of his house. Fujita was educated at the University of Tokyo law school and after graduating in 1951, he decided to work at the importing business he started while attending the university.

== McDonald's Japan ==
After his first McDonald's meal in 1967, Fujita was amazed by its efficiency and popularity. After selling imported bags and shoes, Fujita seized on the opportunity to start McDonald's franchises in Japan in 1971. His strategy for selling McDonald's to the Japanese people involved the following statement: "The reason Japanese people are so short and have yellow skins is because they have eaten nothing but fish and rice for two thousand years... if we eat McDonald's hamburgers and potatoes for a thousand years we will become taller, our skin become white, and our hair blonde."

He opened his first McDonald's in Mitsukoshi department store in Ginza, an upscale district in Tokyo, Japan. However, while McDonald's Japan opened its first restaurant in 1971, McDonald's Japan did not begin television advertising and radio advertising until 1973. McDonald's Japan now has 3,800 restaurants, earning revenue of approximately $4 billion a year (60% of the hamburger market). Much of the success was due to the Japanese styled offerings such as the Teriyaki McBurger and Chicken Tatsuta. After building McDonald's presence in Japan and building a net worth of about $1 billion, Fujita retired on March 5, 2003. His ambitions, however, did not recede with age as he predicted that there would be 10,000 McDonald's in Japan by 2010. In December 2003, McDonald's paid $57 million (estimated) for canceling its contract with Fujita & Co. (Fujita's consulting company) along with a $24 million retirement bonus. Fujita's family held a 25% stake in McDonald's Japan until selling it to Longreach private equity fund in 2005. At the time the shares had a market value of $674 million.

== Other roles ==
Fujita served on the board of Softbank, whose Japanese founder, Masayoshi Son, once idolized Fujita as a boy. He served as vice-chairman of Toys 'R' Us Japan. Fujita wrote eight books on business strategy. His first book, The Jewish Way of Doing Business, explained that Jews had taken over the business world and exhorted his readers to use Jewish business methods to become rich themselves. The book was also part autobiography, in which Fujita drew parallels between antisemitism and the discrimination he himself faced because of his Kansai dialect. (He also believed that Jews had settled in Osaka some 1,000 years ago, which was why people from the area were craftier businessmen.) Published the year after Fujita opened his first McDonald's restaurant in Ginza, the book was an immediate success and went on to sell over a million copies.

== Death ==
At the age of 78, Den Fujita died of heart failure on April 21, 2004. Two days earlier, McDonald's CEO Jim Cantalupo had died of a heart attack. After his death, Japanese media wrote about his estate and entrepreneur-advocates subsequently questioned the government about inheritance tax that his heirs had to pay. All his personal property and investments, which were left over from his earnings after paying income taxes, was subject to Japan's inheritance tax. Tax office data showed that Fujita left US$462 million to his family.

== Awards and honors ==
- Business Week: The Stars of Asia Managers (2001)
- Forbes: World's Richest People (1999 - )
- Blue Ribbon Award for business achievement from emperor Hirohito (1986)
