= Banana (disambiguation) =

Banana is the common name for flowering plants of the genus Musa and for the fruit they produce.

Banana or bananas may also refer to:

== In nature ==
- Ensete ventricosum (Ethiopian banana, false banana, enset), an important foodcrop in Ethiopia
- Nymphoides aquatica (banana plant), an aquatic species known for its unusual root structure
- Strelitzia nicolai (wild banana), a banana-like plant with an erect woody stem
- Banana spider

== Places ==
=== United States ===
- Banana, Florida, an unincorporated community
- Banana Lake, Florida
- Banana River, Florida

=== Elsewhere ===
- Banana, Cape Verde, a settlement on Santiago Island
- Banana, Democratic Republic of the Congo, a small seaport in Kongo Central Province
- Banana, Kiribati, a settlement on Kiritimati Island
- Banana Island (disambiguation)
- Shire of Banana, a local government area in Queensland, Australia
  - Banana, Queensland, Australia, a small town in the Shire of Banana
- Banana belt, any segment of a geographic region with generally warmer climates

== Arts and entertainment ==
=== Film and television ===
- Bananas (film), a 1971 comedy film directed by and starring Woody Allen
- Bananaz, a 2008 British documentary by Ceri Levy
- Bananas!*, a 2009 Swedish documentary directed by Fredrik Gertten
- Banana, a 2010 short film from the Despicable Me franchise
- Banana (film), a 2015 comedy-drama film directed by Andrea Jublin
- The Bananas (TV series), a 1969 Canadian children's television series
- Banana (TV series), a 2015 British anthology series by Russell T. Davies
- "The Banana" (The Amazing World of Gumball), a season 2 episode

=== Music ===
- Banana (band), a former Yugoslav pop rock band
- Bananas (Deep Purple album), a 2003 album
- Bananas (Malcolm Middleton album), a 2018 album
- The Velvet Underground & Nico, a 1967 rock album sometimes referred to as the "Banana Album"
- "Banana" (Anitta song) (with Becky G), a track from the 2019 album Kisses by Anitta
- "Banana" (Conkarah song), a 2019 song by Conkarah featuring Shaggy
- "Bananas (Who You Gonna Call?)", a 1998 single by Queen Latifah
- "Bananas", a track from the 2008 album Inherit by Free Kitten
- "Day-O (The Banana Boat Song)", a traditional Jamaican folk song
- "Banana", a skit from the 2005 album Arular by M.I.A.

=== Games ===
- Banana (1986 video game), a video game released on the Family Computer in 1986 in Japan
- Banana (2024 video game), a clicker game released through Steam in 2024
- Banana (gamer), Chinese competitive Dota 2 player
- Banana, the currency of the Donkey Kong franchise

=== Other arts and entertainment ===
- WWBN ("Banana 101.5"), a rock music radio station in Michigan
- Bananas (literary magazine), a British literary magazine from 1975 until 1979
- Banana (magazine), an Asian-American themed magazine
- Bananas Comedy Club, two venues for stand-up comedy in the northeastern United States

== People ==
- Banana (name), a list of people with the given name, surname, pen name or stage name
- Banana (slur), an Asian person living in a Western country who has lost touch with their Asian cultural identity
- Robert "Bananas" Foster, a member of the American electronic band Freezepop

== Other uses ==
- Banana equivalent dose, an informal measurement of ionizing radiation exposure
- Savannah Bananas, an barnstorming baseball team in the Banana Ball Championship League
- Banana', a dialect of the Bamayo language of Borneo, Indonesia
- Build Absolutely Nothing Anywhere Near Anything, an acronym used to describe the attitude of people opposed to land development
- Barium sodium niobate, a chemical compound whose simple name in the materials science community is banana

== See also ==
- Banana boat (disambiguation)
- Banana fish (disambiguation)
- Banana Joe (disambiguation)
- Banana Man (disambiguation)
- Banana republic (disambiguation)
- Banana Split (disambiguation)
- Anana (disambiguation)
- Bana (disambiguation)
- Banan (disambiguation)
- Banani (disambiguation)
- Going bananas (disambiguation)
- Joseph Bonanno (1905–2002), Italian-American Mafia boss also known as "Joe Bananas"
- Antonio Caponigro (1912–1980), American mobster also known as "Tony Bananas"
- Bannana, a genus of goblin spiders from China
- Banania, a chocolate drink
- Bananya, a Japanese animated television series
