= Giant herring =

Giant herring is a common name for several fishes and may refer to:

- Chanos chanos
- Elops hawaiensis
- Elops machnata
- Elops saurus
- Tenualosa toli
