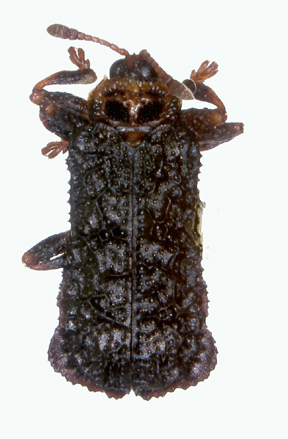
- Octotoma plicatula

Scientific classification
- Kingdom: Animalia
- Phylum: Arthropoda
- Clade: Pancrustacea
- Class: Insecta
- Order: Coleoptera
- Suborder: Polyphaga
- Infraorder: Cucujiformia
- Family: Chrysomelidae
- Subfamily: Cassidinae
- Tribe: Chalepini
- Genus: Octotoma; Dejean, 1836

= Octotoma =

Genus of beetles

Octotoma is a genus of tortoise beetles and hispines in the family Chrysomelidae. There are about 12 described species in Octotoma.

== Species ==
These species belong to the genus Octotoma:

Species	Taxon name and author	Habitat	Notes	ITIS ID
Octotoma brasiliensis	Octotoma brasiliensis (Julius Weise, 1921)	Brazil		841433
Lantana leafminer	Octotoma championi (Joseph Sugar Baly, 1886)	Texas, Belize, Costa Rica, El Salvador, Guatemala, Honduras, Nicaragua, Panama	Larvae have been recorded feeding on Lantana camara, Lantana hispida and Lantana trifolia, while adults feed on Mentha, Origanum and Sesamum species.	719970
Octotoma crassicornis	Octotoma crassicornis (Julius Weise, 1910)	Brazil		841434
Octotoma gundlachii	Octotoma gundlachii (Christian Suffrian, 1868)	Cuba	Introduced to Hawaii, but is not established there. They have been recorded feeding on Lantana species.	841437
Octotoma intermedia	Octotoma intermedia (Charles L. Staines, 1989)	Tamaulipas		841438
Octotoma marginicollis	Octotoma marginicollis (Walther Horn, 1883)	United States, Mexico	They have been recorded feeding on Perezia thurberi. Adults have been collected on Fraxinus species.	719971
Octotoma nigra	Octotoma nigra (Erich Uhmann, 1940)	Bahia		841435
Trumpet creeper leaf miner	Octotoma plicatula (Johan Christian Fabricius, 1801)	United States	Have been recorded feeding on Campsis radicans. Adults have been collected on Aesculus and Lespedeza species, Fraxinus americana, Fraxinus pennsylvanica, Ligustrum vulgare and Chionanthus virginicus.	719972
Octotoma puncticollis	Octotoma puncticollis (Charles L. Staines, 1994)	Guatemala		844878
Lantana leaf beetle	Octotoma scabripennis (Félix Guérin-Méneville, 1844)	El Salvador, Guatemala, Honduras, Mexico, Nicaragua	Introduced into Australia, the Cook Islands, Fiji, Ghana, Guam, Hawaii, India, New Caledonia, the Solomon Islands and South Africa to kill the invasive Lantana camara plant.	187785
Octotoma variegata	Octotoma variegata (Erich Uhmann, 1954)	Bahia		841436
