= A. nana =

A. nana may refer to:

- Acanthiza nana, the Yellow Thornbill, a passerine bird species usually found in Australia
- Acourtia nana, the dwarf desertpeony, a plant species in the genus Acourtia found in the Sonoran Desert
- Agriocnemis nana, a species of Coenagrionid damselfly from South and Southeast Asia
- Amorpha nana, the dwarf indigo, dwarf indigobush, dwarf false indigo, fragrant indigo-bush, fragrant false indigo or dwarf wild indigo, a perennial shrub species native to North America
- Aratinga nana, the Olive-throated Parakeet, a bird species
- Aristolochia nana, the tiny pelican flower, a plant species in the genus Aristolochia

== Synonyms ==
- Amygdalus nana, a synonym for Prunus tenella, the dwarf Russian almond, a deciduous tree species

== Other uses ==
- Nana (surname), for people abbreviated as "A. Nana"

== See also ==
- Nana (disambiguation)
- Anana (disambiguation)
