= Banana Joe (disambiguation) =

Joe Montione (born 1954), better known as Banana Joe, is an American radio personality.

Banana Joe may also refer to:

- Banana Joe (character), a character from The Amazing World of Gumball
- Banana Joe (film), a 1982 Italian action-comedy film
- Banana Joe V Tani Kazari, a toy Affenpinscher dog and championship winner

== See also ==
- Joe Bananas (1905–2002), American organized crime boss
- Joe Bananas, aka Ol' Dirty Bastard (1968–2004), American rapper
- Joseph A. Bonanno, American optometrist
