= Bananafish =

Bananafish or banana fish may refer to:

- "A Perfect Day for Bananafish", a short story by J. D. Salinger
- Banana Fish, a manga series by Akimi Yoshida
- Bananafish Magazine, an underground culture magazine

== Music ==
- "Bananafishbones", a song by The Cure from The Top
- "Bananafish no Hamabe to Kuroi Niji", a song by Galileo Galilei from See More Glass
- "Banana Fish", a song by Shonen Knife from Burning Farm

== Species ==
- Albula neoguinaica and Albula vulpes, two species of bonefishes
- Double-lined fusilier, or banana fish
- Elops hawaiensis, or banana fish
- Elops machnata, or banana fish
- Horseface loach, or banana-root fish
- Pterocaesio pisang, or banana fusilier
- Bonefish, or banana fish
