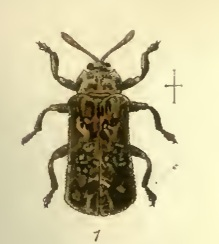

Scientific classification
- Kingdom: Animalia
- Phylum: Arthropoda
- Class: Insecta
- Order: Coleoptera
- Suborder: Polyphaga
- Infraorder: Cucujiformia
- Family: Chrysomelidae
- Genus: Octotoma
- Species: O. marginicollis

Binomial name
- Octotoma marginicollis Horn, 1883

= Octotoma marginicollis =

Species of beetle

Octotoma marginicollis is a species of leaf beetle in the family Chrysomelidae. It is found in Central America and North America, where it has been recorded from the United States (Arizona, California, New Mexico, Texas, Utah) and Mexico (Coahuila, Guanajuato, Jalisco, Morelos, Tamaulipas).

== Biology ==
They have been recorded feeding on Perezia thurberi. Adults have been collected on Fraxinus species (including Fraxinus greggii, Fraxinus velutina and Fraxinus attenuata), Baccharis bigelovii, Baccharis glutinosa, Brickellia californica, Brickellia floribunda, Viguiera cordiflua and Monarda menthaefolia.
