= Banana spider =

Banana spider may refer to:

- Cupiennius, a South and Central American genus of spiders
- Phoneutria, also known as Brazilian wandering spiders, a related South and Central American genus of extremely venomous spiders
- Golden silk orb-weaver (Nephila), a widespread genus of large but rather harmless spiders, noted for their large durable webs
- Argiope appensa, a black and yellow spider on several islands in the Western Pacific Ocean
- Trichonephila clavipes, a species of the genus Trichonephila indigenous to continental North and South America
- Banana spider myth, an urban legend regarding huntsman spiders

== See also ==
- Bannana, a genus of goblin spiders from China
