= Octotoma championi =

Scientific classification
- Kingdom: Animalia
- Phylum: Arthropoda
- Clade: Pancrustacea
- Class: Insecta
- Order: Coleoptera
- Suborder: Polyphaga
- Infraorder: Cucujiformia
- Family: Chrysomelidae
- Genus: Octotoma
- Species: O. championi

Binomial name
- Octotoma championi Baly, 1886

Species of beetle

Octotoma championi, known generally as the lantana leafminer or lantana leaf beetle, is a species of leaf beetle in the family Chrysomelidae. It is native to Central America and North America, where it has been recorded from the United States (Texas), Belize, Costa Rica, El Salvador, Guatemala, Honduras, Nicaragua and Panama. It has been introduced to Australia, Fiji, Hawaii and South Africa.

== Biology ==
Larvae have been recorded feeding on Lantana camara, Lantana hispida and Lantana trifolia, while adults feed on Mentha, Origanum and Sesamum species.
