= Senegalese ladyfish =

Conservation status
- Data Deficient (IUCN 3.1)

Scientific classification
- Kingdom: Animalia
- Phylum: Chordata
- Class: Actinopterygii
- Order: Elopiformes
- Family: Elopidae
- Genus: Elops
- Species: E. senegalensis

Binomial name
- Elops senegalensis Regan, 1909

Species of ray-finned fish

The Senegalese ladyfish (Elops senegalensis) is a species of ray-finned fish in the family Elopidae, and it's native to the coastal waters of the eastern Atlantic Ocean from Mauritania to the Democratic Republic of the Congo. It is often confused with the West African ladyfish, Elops lacerta, and can be distinguished only by the number of gill rakers on the lower part of the first gill arch, and the number of scales on the lateral line.

The Senegalese ladyfish grows to a maximum total length of 90 cm and a maximum weight of 5.9 kg.

== Threats ==
This species uses estuarine areas and hypersaline lagoons; changes in the quality of these habitats may affect this species' population dynamics. Although this species may not be closely associated with any single habitat, it may be adversely affected by development and urbanization.
