= Octotoma puncticollis =

Scientific classification
- Kingdom: Animalia
- Phylum: Arthropoda
- Class: Insecta
- Order: Coleoptera
- Suborder: Polyphaga
- Infraorder: Cucujiformia
- Family: Chrysomelidae
- Genus: Octotoma
- Species: O. puncticollis

Binomial name
- Octotoma puncticollis Staines, 1994

Species of beetle

Octotoma puncticollis is a species of beetle of the family Chrysomelidae. It is found in Guatemala.
