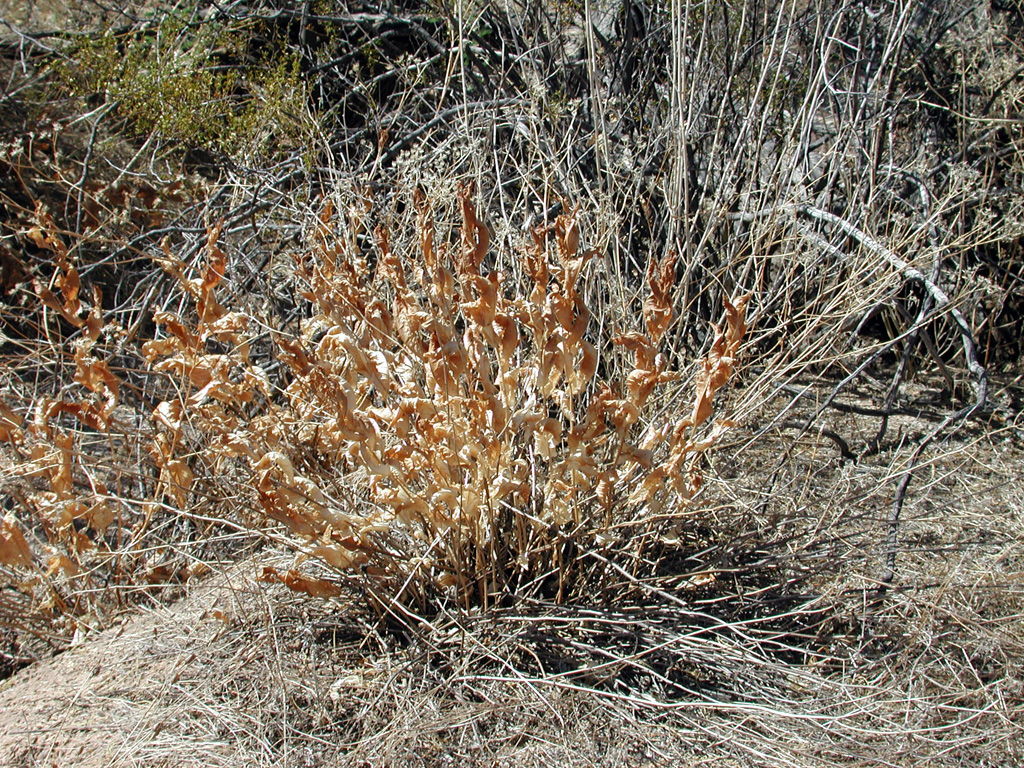
- Dormant phase

Conservation status
- Secure (NatureServe)

Scientific classification
- Kingdom: Plantae
- Clade: Tracheophytes
- Clade: Angiosperms
- Clade: Eudicots
- Clade: Asterids
- Order: Asterales
- Family: Asteraceae
- Genus: Acourtia
- Species: A. wrightii

Binomial name
- Acourtia wrightii (A. Gray) Reveal & King

Synonyms
- Perezia arizonica A.Gray; Perezia schaffneri A.Gray; Perezia wrightii A.Gray

= Acourtia wrightii =

Species of flowering plant

Acourtia wrightii, common name brownfoot, is a North American species of plant in the family Asteraceae. It is native to the southwestern United States (Texas, New Mexico, Arizona, southern Utah, southern Nevada) and northern Mexico (Chihuahua, Coahuila, Durango, Nuevo León, San Luis Potosí, Sonora, Zacatecas).

It is used by the Kayenta Navajo for difficult labor and as a postpartum medicine. The Hualapai also use it medicinally; in that they apply a poultice of the woolly "cotton" from the plant to open, bleeding wounds, and the Pima use it as a styptic.
