= Banana republic (disambiguation) =

A banana republic is a country dependent on a single, limited-resource export.

Banana republic may also refer to:

== Music ==
- Banana Republic (album), by Francesco De Gregori and Lucio Dalla (1979)
- "Banana Republic" (song), a 1980 single by The Boomtown Rats
- "Banana Republics", a song by Steve Goodman, Jim Rothermel, and Steve Burgh (1976)

== Film ==
- Bananas (film), a 1971 comedy film by Woody Allen, set in a fictional banana republic
- Bananas!*, a 2009 Swedish documentary

== Other uses ==
- Banana Republic, an American chain of clothing stores
- Republica de los Bananas, a fictional country in the board game Junta

== See also ==
- Banana (disambiguation)
