= Pineapple (disambiguation) =

The pineapple is a tropical plant, and also refers to the edible fruit it bears.

Pineapple may also refer to:

== Music ==
- "Pineapple" (Ty Dolla Sign song), 2018
- "Pineapple" (Karol G song), 2018
- "Pineapple", a song by Jah Wobble from The Legend Lives On... Jah Wobble in "Betrayal", 1980
- "Pineapple", a song by Karol G from Ocean, 2019
- "Pineapple", a song by New World Sound, 2014
- "Pineapple", a song by Sparks from Indiscreet, 1975
- "Pineapple", a song by Takanashi Kiara from Point of View, 2023

== Other uses ==
- The Pineapple, a folly building in Scotland
- Pineapple grenade, nickname for the U.S. Mk 2 hand grenade
- Pineapple, a 2008 film featuring Skye McCole Bartusiak
- A community card variation of poker
- A member of the Pi Alpha Phi fraternity
- A nickname for the Our Gang character played by Eugene Jackson
- Australian fifty-dollar note, as a slang term

== See also ==
- Anana (disambiguation)
- Pine (disambiguation)
- Apple (disambiguation)
