= Banan =

Banan may refer to:

- Banan, Chongqing, a district of Chongqing Municipality, China
- Banan District, Battambang, a district in Battambang Province, Cambodia
- Banan, Syria, a town in Aleppo Governorate, Syria
- Gholam Hossein Banan, an Iranian traditional music vocalist
- Banan (sports ground), a former sports ground in Landskrona, Scania, Sweden

== See also ==
- Banana (disambiguation)
- Banani (disambiguation)
