= Banana Split (disambiguation) =

A banana split is a dessert that includes a banana and ice cream.

"Banana Split" or "Banana Splits" can also refer to:

- Banana Sundae, a Filipino comedy gag show known from 2008 to 2011 as Banana Split
- Banana Split (film), a 2018 American comedy film
- "Le Banana Split", a 1979 song by Belgian pop singer Lio
- The Banana Splits, a fictional musical group featured on the 1968–1970 American TV show The Banana Splits Adventure Hour
  - "The Tra La La Song (One Banana, Two Banana)", the theme song for the series, sometimes referred to as "Banana Splits (Tra La La Song)"
- Banana Split, a submission hold in Brazilian Jiu-Jitsu and wrestling

== See also ==
- Banana boat (food), a dessert involving banana, chocolate and marshmallow
