= Acourtia hintoniorum =

Scientific classification
- Kingdom: Plantae
- Clade: Tracheophytes
- Clade: Angiosperms
- Clade: Eudicots
- Clade: Asterids
- Order: Asterales
- Family: Asteraceae
- Genus: Acourtia
- Species: A. hintoniorum

Binomial name
- Acourtia hintoniorum B.L.Turner (1994)

Species of plant

Acourtia hintoniorum is a species of plant in the genus Acourtia found in Nuevo León, Mexico.

== Description ==
The plants have many leaves, with leaves becoming smaller in size going up the stem, and which do not overlap very much. The leaves at the midstem are elliptic to ovate-elliptic, as well as serrated. The flower heads are very large, and form cymes of 1-5 heads, giving way to many florets around purple corollas.

== Discovery ==
This species was discovered at the side of a road. It was first collected by Dr. Guy L. Nesom in 1989, who misidentified it as Acourtia tomentosa, which is only known from southern Puebla, Mexico. Billie L. Turner was the first to notice this discrepancy and described it as a new species. Essentially the differentiation is that Acourtia hintoniorum is taller with less wide leaves than A. tomentosa.
