= Banani =

Banani may refer to:

== People ==
- Bruno Banani (luger), a Tongan Olympian

== Places ==
- Banani (neighbourhood)
- Banani, Mali a village
- Banani Model Town, a neighbourhood of Dhaka, Bangladesh
- Banani Lake, Dhaka, Bangladesh

== Other uses ==
- Bruno Banani, a German fashion company
- Banani International Secondary School, Chisamba, Zambia
- Banani railway station, Dhaka
- Banáni, 2023 Czech crime comedy television series

== See also ==
- Al-Bannani (1727-1780) Moroccan Islamic jurist
- Banana (disambiguation)
- Banan (disambiguation)
