= Octotoma intermedia =

Scientific classification
- Kingdom: Animalia
- Phylum: Arthropoda
- Class: Insecta
- Order: Coleoptera
- Suborder: Polyphaga
- Infraorder: Cucujiformia
- Family: Chrysomelidae
- Genus: Octotoma
- Species: O. intermedia

Binomial name
- Octotoma intermedia Staines, 1989

Species of beetle

Octotoma intermedia is a species of beetle of the family Chrysomelidae. It is found in Mexico (Tamaulipas).
