= Octotoma gundlachii =

Scientific classification
- Kingdom: Animalia
- Phylum: Arthropoda
- Class: Insecta
- Order: Coleoptera
- Suborder: Polyphaga
- Infraorder: Cucujiformia
- Family: Chrysomelidae
- Genus: Octotoma
- Species: O. gundlachii

Binomial name
- Octotoma gundlachii Suffrian, 1868

Species of beetle

Octotoma gundlachii is a species of beetle of the family Chrysomelidae. It is native to Cuba and was introduced to Hawaii, but is not established there.

== Biology ==
They have been recorded feeding on Lantana species.
