= Octotoma nigra =

Scientific classification
- Kingdom: Animalia
- Phylum: Arthropoda
- Class: Insecta
- Order: Coleoptera
- Suborder: Polyphaga
- Infraorder: Cucujiformia
- Family: Chrysomelidae
- Genus: Octotoma
- Species: O. nigra

Binomial name
- Octotoma nigra Uhmann, 1940

Species of beetle

Octotoma nigra is a species of beetle of the family Chrysomelidae. It is found in Brazil (Bahia).
