= Octotoma brasiliensis =

Scientific classification
- Kingdom: Animalia
- Phylum: Arthropoda
- Class: Insecta
- Order: Coleoptera
- Suborder: Polyphaga
- Infraorder: Cucujiformia
- Family: Chrysomelidae
- Genus: Octotoma
- Species: O. brasiliensis

Binomial name
- Octotoma brasiliensis Weise, 1921

Species of beetle

Octotoma brasiliensis is a species of beetle of the family Chrysomelidae. It is found in Brazil.
