= Anana =

Anana or Ananas or variation may refer to:

== Plants ==
- Pineapple (Ananas comosus), also known as "anana" and "ananas" in different languages
- Ananas, a plant genus, that includes pineapple

== Places ==
- Ananás, Tocantins, Brazil, a village
- Añana, Álava, Spain, a village and a valley
- Cuadrilla de Añana, Álava, Spain

== Religion and mythology ==
- Anana (Mandaeism), clouds or female consorts in Mandaeism

== Other uses ==
- Thelenota ananas, the pineapple sea cucumber, an animal
- Boletellus ananas, the pineapple bolete, a mushroom
- Physopyxis ananas, a catfish

== See also ==
- Pineapple (disambiguation)
- Banana (disambiguation)
- A. nana (disambiguation)
