= Elops eutawanus =

Elops eutawanus Temporal range: Santonian

Scientific classification
- Kingdom: Animalia
- Phylum: Chordata
- Class: Actinopterygii
- Division: Teleostei
- Order: Elopiformes
- Family: Elopidae
- Genus: Elops
- Species: †E. eutawanus

Binomial name
- †Elops eutawanus Schwarzhans et al., 2018

Extinct species of fish

Elops eutawanus is an extinct species of Elops that lived during the Santonian stage of the Late Cretaceous epoch.

== Distribution ==
Elops eutawanus fossils are known from the Eutaw Formation of Alabama.
