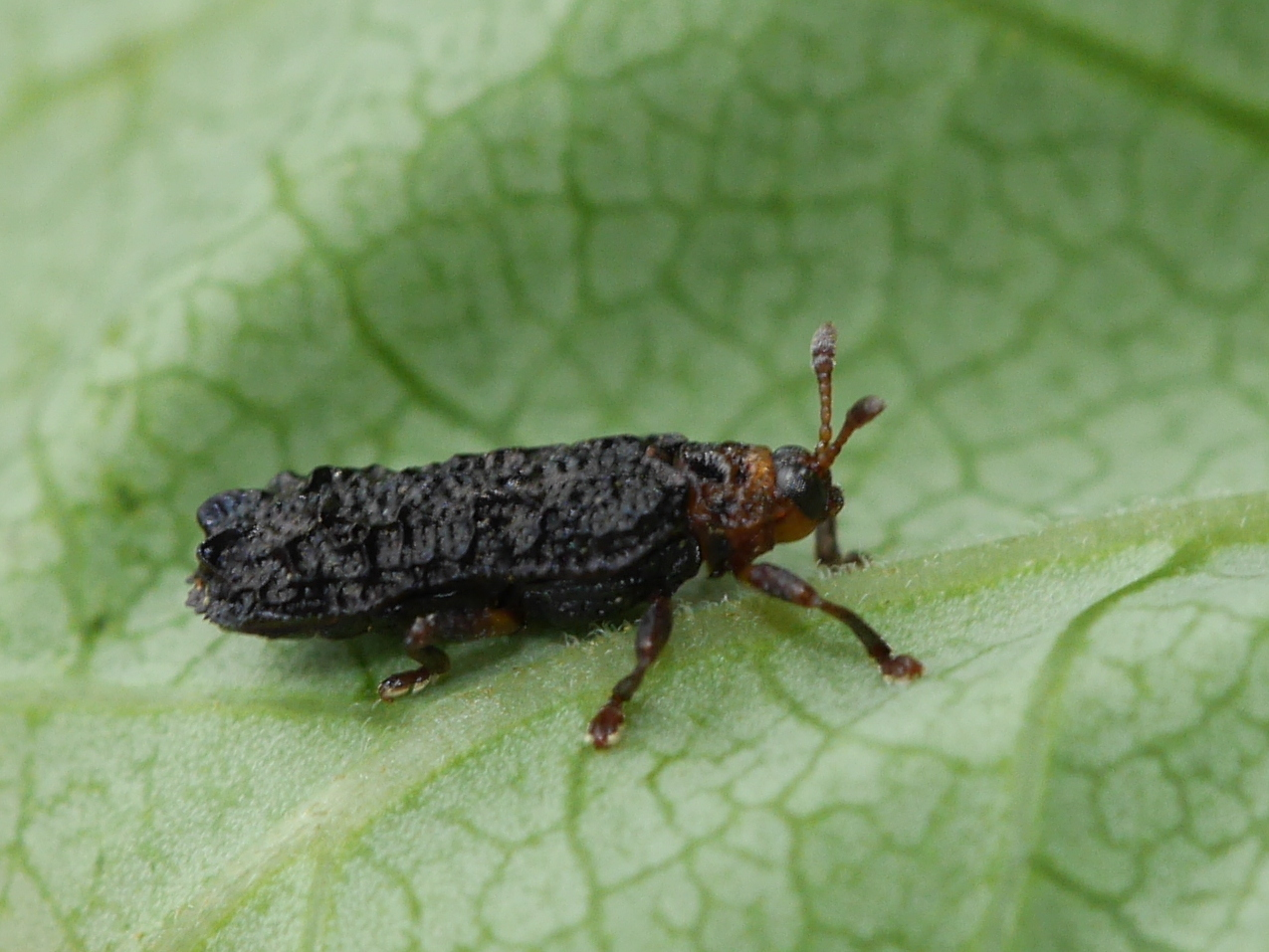

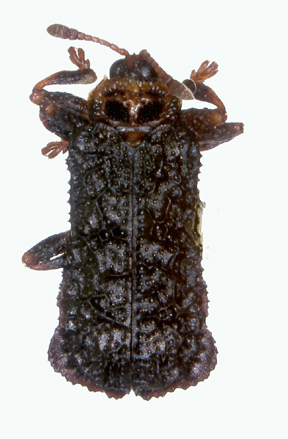

Scientific classification
- Kingdom: Animalia
- Phylum: Arthropoda
- Class: Insecta
- Order: Coleoptera
- Suborder: Polyphaga
- Infraorder: Cucujiformia
- Family: Chrysomelidae
- Genus: Octotoma
- Species: O. plicatula

Binomial name
- Octotoma plicatula (Fabricius, 1801)

Synonyms
- Hispa plicatula Fabricius, 1801

= Octotoma plicatula =

Species of beetle

Octotoma plicatula, the trumpet creeper leaf miner, is a species of leaf beetle in the family Chrysomelidae. It is found in North America, where it has been recorded from the United States (Alabama, Arkansas, Delaware, District of Columbia, Florida, Georgia, Illinois, Indiana, Kansas, Kentucky, Louisiana, Maryland, Michigan, Mississippi, Missouri, North Carolina, Ohio, Oklahoma, South Carolina, Tennessee, Texas, Virginia, West Virginia).

== Biology ==
They have been recorded feeding on Campsis radicans. Adults have been collected on Aesculus and Lespedeza species, Fraxinus americana, Fraxinus pennsylvanica, Ligustrum vulgare and Chionanthus virginicus.
