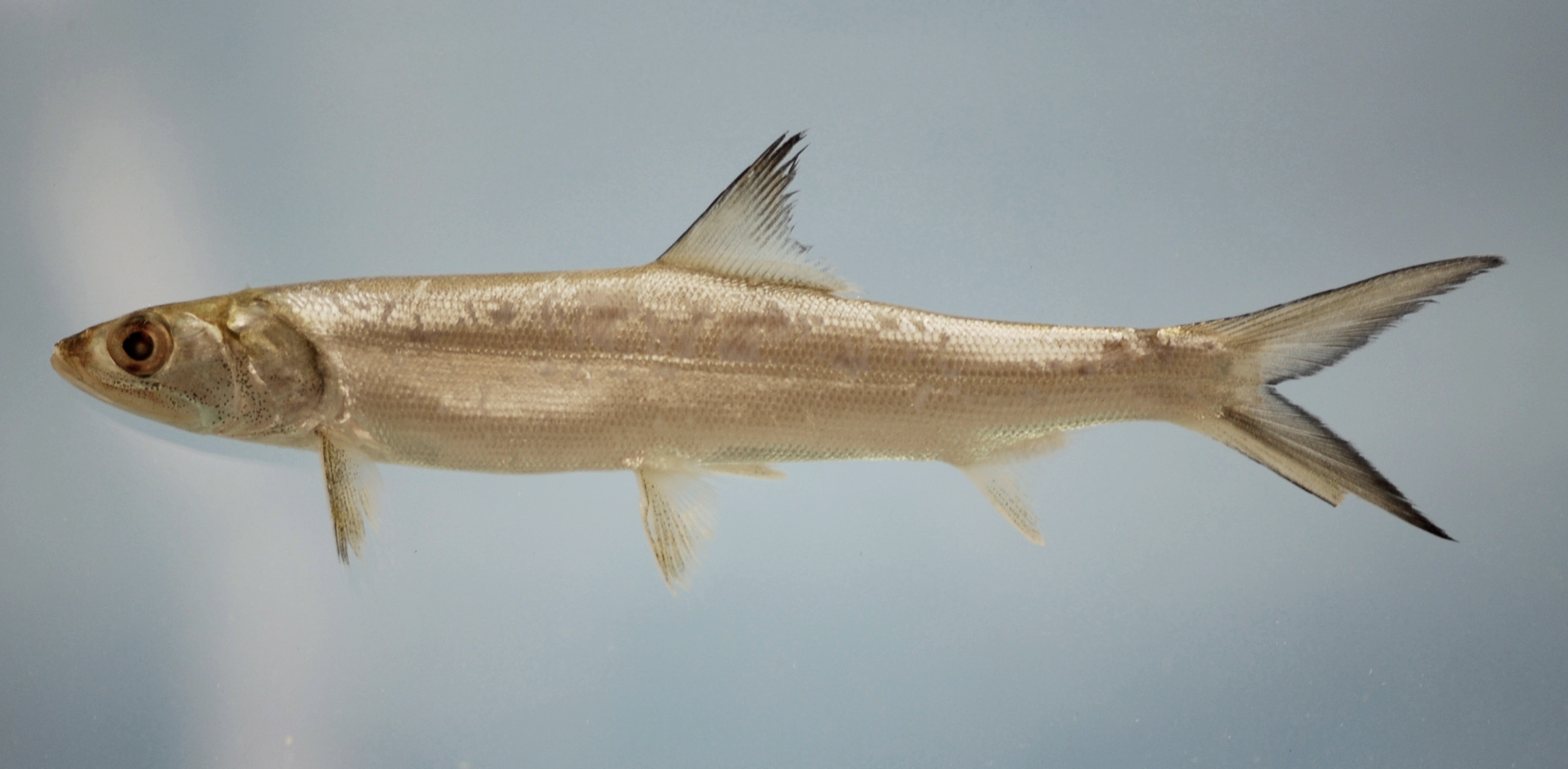
- Elops saurus

Scientific classification
- Kingdom: Animalia
- Phylum: Chordata
- Class: Actinopterygii
- Division: Teleostei
- Order: Elopiformes
- Family: Elopidae
- Genus: Elops; Linnaeus, 1766

Species
- See text

= Elops =

Elops Temporal range: Early Cretaceous (Aptian) to present

Genus of fishes

Elops is a genus of marine ray-finned fish found worldwide, and the only extant member of the ancient family Elopidae. They are commonly known as ladyfish, skipjacks, jack-rashes, or tenpounders.

They are fished, but their bodies are bony, so these fish are not marketed widely for consumption. They are caught and used as bait or may be ground down for fish meal.

== Taxonomy ==
The currently recognized extant species in this genus are:

- Elops affinis Regan, 1909 (Pacific ladyfish)
- Elops hawaiensis Regan, 1909 (Hawaiian ladyfish or giant herring)
- Elops lacerta Valenciennes, 1847 (West African ladyfish or Guinean ladyfish)
- Elops machnata (Forsskål, 1775) (tenpounder)
- Elops saurus Linnaeus, 1766 (ladyfish)
- Elops senegalensis Regan, 1909 (Senegalese ladyfish)
- Elops smithi McBride, Rocha, Ruiz-Carus & Bowen, 2010 (malacho)

The following fossil species are known, all from otoliths:

- †Elops bultyncki Nolf, 2004 - Early Cretaceous (Aptian) of Spain
- †Elops eutawanus Schwarzhans et al., 2018 - Late Cretaceous (Santonian) of Alabama, USA
- †Elops miiformis Lin et al., 2016 - Middle Eocene (Lutetian) of France
- †Elops ramaekersii Schwarzhans, 1985 - Paleocene or early Eocene of Ellesmere Island, Canada)
- ?†Elops undulatus Stinton, 1966 - early Eocene of England

Excluding these fossil otoliths, the earliest fossil remains of Elops are known from the Early Oligocene of Germany.

Phylogenetic analyses indicate that, in contrast to the ancient nature of the group, the modern species diversity within Elops originates from a relatively recent evolutionary radiation.

== Description ==
The ladyfish are a coastal-dwelling fish found throughout the tropical and subtropical regions, occasionally venturing into temperate waters. Spawning takes place at sea, and the fish larvae migrate inland entering brackish waters. Their food is smaller fish and crustaceans (shrimp). Typically throughout the species, the maximum size is 1 m (3.3 ft) and the maximum weight 10 kg (22 lb). The body is fusiform (tapering spindle shape) and oval in cross-section; being slightly laterally compressed, and the eyes are large and partially covered with adipose eyelids.

Like those of eels, the larvae are leptocephalic - being highly compressed, ribbon-like, and transparent. After initial growth, they shrink and then metamorphose into the adult form.
