= Banana boat =

Banana boat may refer to:

== Transport ==
=== Aircraft ===
- "Banana Boat", nickname for Consolidated B-24 Liberator, an American World War II bomber

=== Vessels ===
- Banana boat (aircraft carrier), an informal RAF slang term
- Banana boat (boat), an unpowered recreational boat
- Banana boat (ship), a ship whose primary role is the transportation of bananas as cargo

== Art, entertainment, and media ==
- Banana Boat, a Polish a cappella group created in 1994
- "Day-O (The Banana Boat Song)", a 1956 traditional Jamaican folk song
- Banana Boat, an alternate slang term related to the phrase Fresh off the boat for newly arrived immigrants
- Banana Boat Team, the nickname for the group of NBA players Carmelo Anthony, LeBron James, Chris Paul and Dwyane Wade

== Brands and enterprises ==
- Banana Boat, a brand of sunscreen manufactured by Sun Pharmaceuticals Corp, a subsidiary of Edgewell Personal Care

== Food, drink, and tableware ==
- Banana boat (food), a campfire dish consisting of a banana stuffed with marshmallow and chocolate
- Banana boat, a liqueur-based cocktail
- Banana boat, a dish used to serve the banana split dessert

== Personal care products ==
- Banana Boat, a brand of sunscreen owned by Edgewell Personal Care
