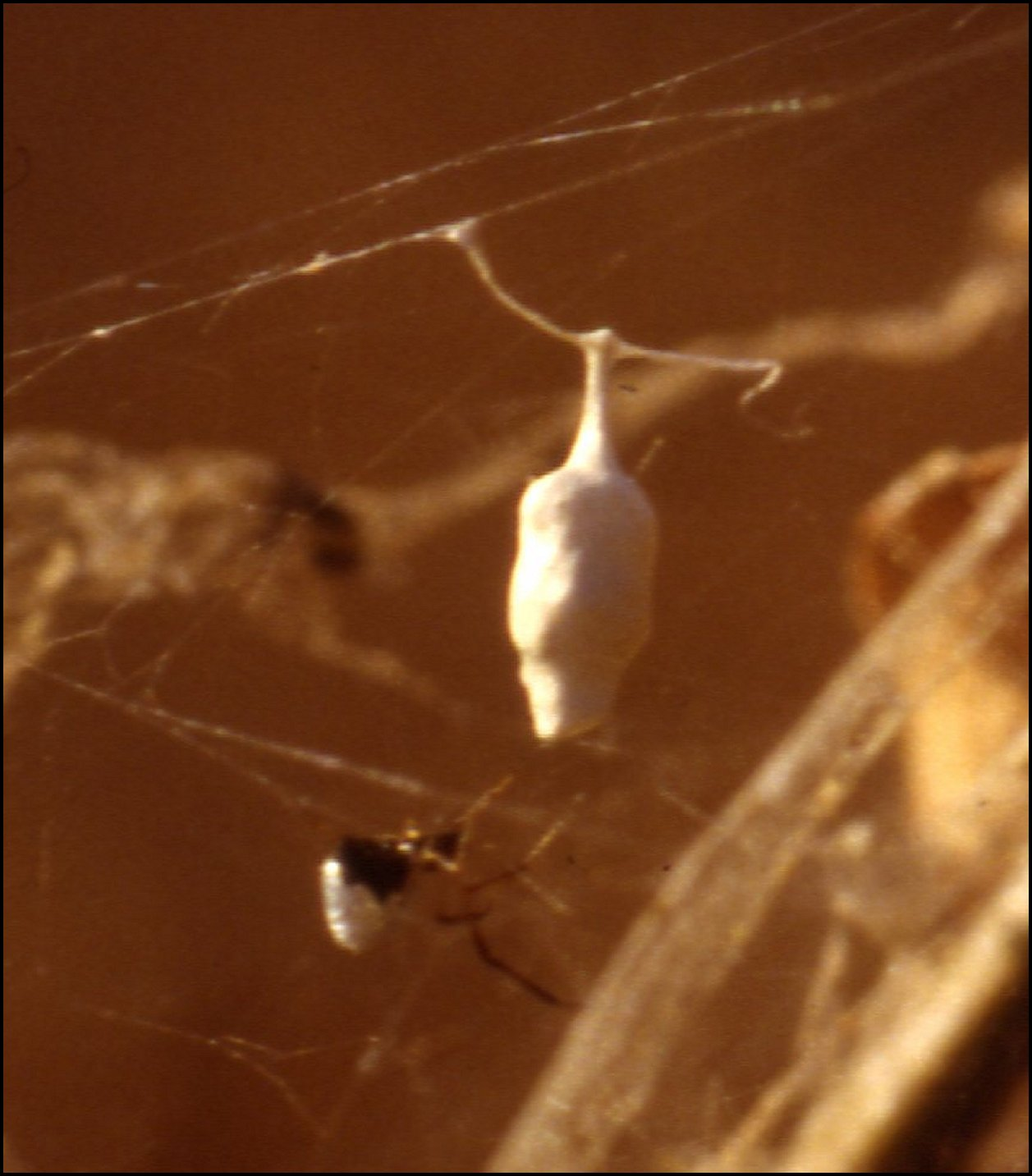

Scientific classification
- Kingdom: Animalia
- Phylum: Arthropoda
- Subphylum: Chelicerata
- Class: Arachnida
- Order: Araneae
- Infraorder: Araneomorphae
- Family: Theridiidae
- Genus: Argyrodes
- Species: A. argentatus

Binomial name
- Argyrodes argentatus O. P-Cambridge, 1880

= Argyrodes argentatus =

Silver comb-footed spider

Species of spider

Argyrodes argentatus is a kleptoparasitic spider.

In Singapore, it is often seen in webs of Nephila antipodiana.

On Guam it can often be found hanging in webs of the much larger spider Argiope appensa: while A. appensa can reach a total length of about 7 cm, A. argentatus females reach only 3mm, and males 2mm at the most.

Like in rats, following copulation the male seals the female's epigyne with a mating plug, preventing the female from further mating.

== Distribution ==
It has been found in China, Japan, Guam, Thailand, Burma, Vietnam, Sri Lanka, the East Indies (Singapore, New Guinea), and Hawaii.

== Name ==
The species name argentatus means "silvery" in Latin.
