= Goin' bananas =

The colloquial term goin' bananas (or going bananas) refers to acting in an erratic or insane manner, often by losing one's temper.

As a title, the term may refer to:

- Goin' Bananas (album), a 1977 album by the group Side Effect
  - "Goin' Bananas", a track from that album
- Goin' Bananas (TV series), a sketch comedy show on Philippine television
- Going Bananas (U.S. series), an American live-action superhero series
- Going Bananas (film), an American comedy movie
- "Going Bananas" (Slinger's Day), a 1986 television episode

== See also ==
- Banana (disambiguation)
- Go Bananas!
- Herbie Goes Bananas
- The Banana Splits
