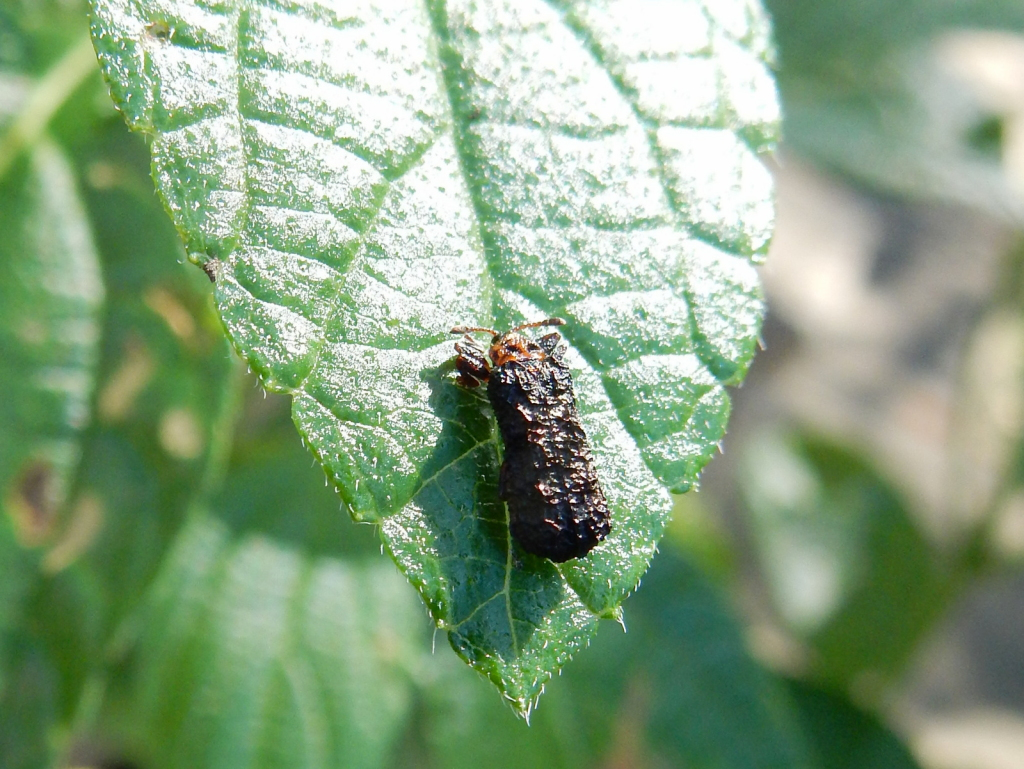

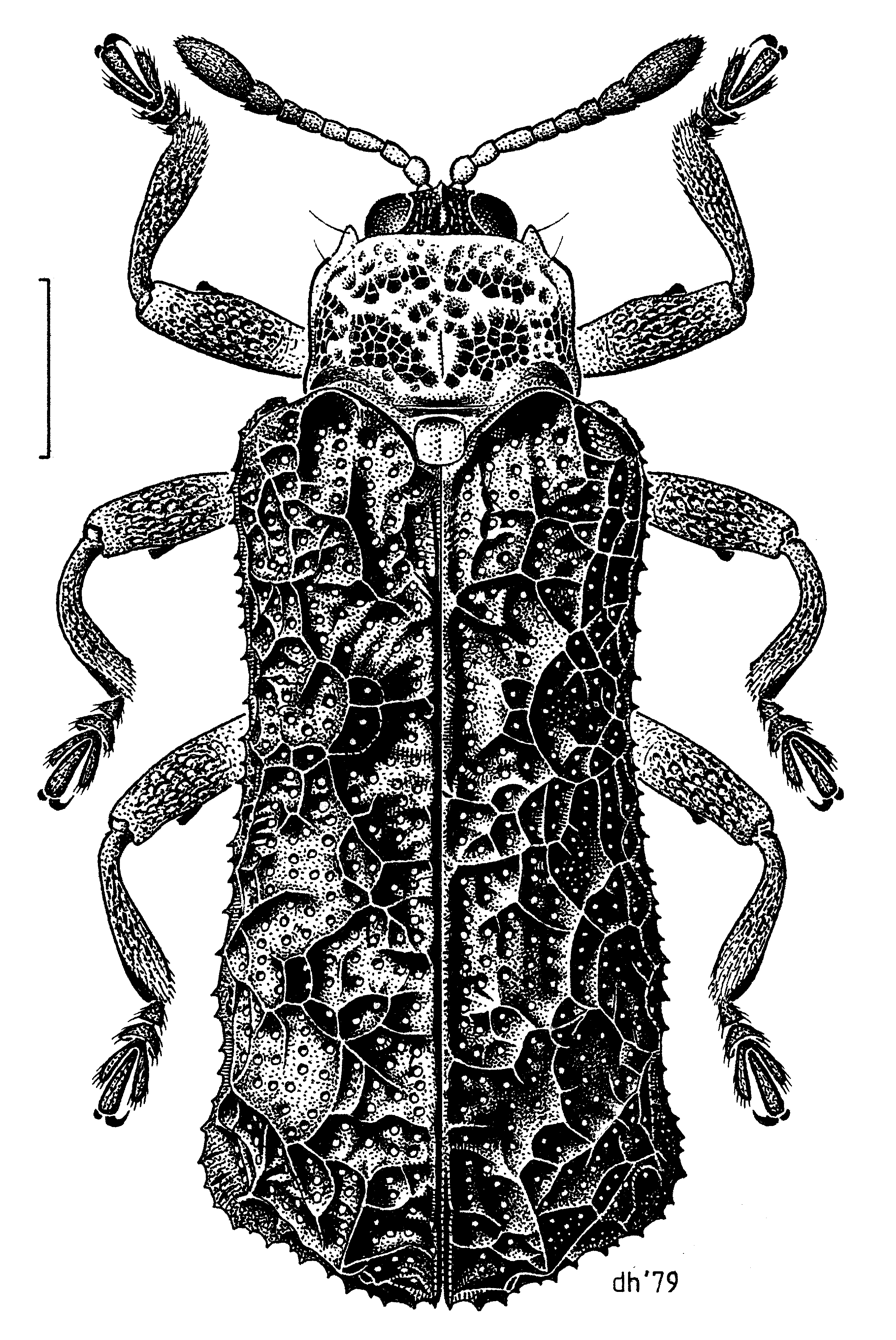

Scientific classification
- Kingdom: Animalia
- Phylum: Arthropoda
- Class: Insecta
- Order: Coleoptera
- Suborder: Polyphaga
- Infraorder: Cucujiformia
- Family: Chrysomelidae
- Genus: Octotoma
- Species: O. scabripennis

Binomial name
- Octotoma scabripennis Guérin-Méneville, 1844

= Octotoma scabripennis =

Species of beetle

Octotoma scabripennis, known as the lantana leafminer and lantana leaf beetle, is a species of beetle in the family Chrysomelidae, originally from Central America (where it has been recorded from El Salvador, Guatemala, Honduras, Mexico and Nicaragua) and introduced into Australia, the Cook Islands, Fiji, Ghana, Guam, Hawaii, India, New Caledonia, the Solomon Islands and South Africa to kill the invasive Lantana camara plant.
