= Banana (name) =

Banana is a name or alias of the following notable people:

Given name

- Banana (video gamer), alias of the Chinese professional Dota player Wang Jiao
- Banana Joe, alias of the American radio personality Joe Montione (born 1954)
- Banana Yaya (born 1991), Cameroonian footballer
- Banana Yoshimoto, pen name of the Japanese writer Mahoko Yoshimoto (born 1964)
- Lowell Levinger, member of The Youngbloods.

Surname

- Anna Banana, alias of the Canadian artist Anne Lee Long (1940–2024)
- Canaan Banana (1936–2003), Methodist minister and first president of Zimbabwe
- Janet Banana (1938–2021), Zimbabwean socialite and wife of Canaan Banana
- Milton Banana, stage name of the Brazilian jazz drummer Antônio de Souza (1935–1998)
