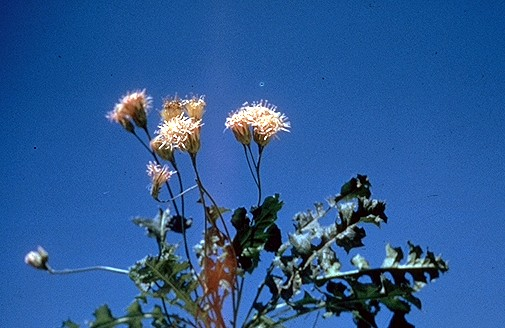

Scientific classification
- Kingdom: Plantae
- Clade: Tracheophytes
- Clade: Angiosperms
- Clade: Eudicots
- Clade: Asterids
- Order: Asterales
- Family: Asteraceae
- Genus: Acourtia
- Species: A. runcinata

Binomial name
- Acourtia runcinata (D.Don) B.L.Turner

Synonyms
- Clarionea runcinata Lag. ex D.Don; Perezia runcinata (Lag. ex D.Don) Lag. ex A.Gray

= Acourtia runcinata =

Species of flowering plant

Acourtia runcinata, the featherleaf desertpeony or desert paeonia, is a North American species of plant in the family Asteraceae. It is native to northern Mexico (Chihuahua, Coahuila, Hidalgo, Nuevo León, San Luis Potosí, Tamaulipas) and also to the state of Texas in the United States.
