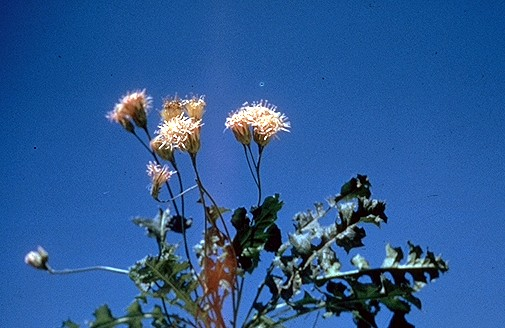
- Acourtia runcinata

Scientific classification
- Kingdom: Plantae
- Clade: Tracheophytes
- Clade: Angiosperms
- Clade: Eudicots
- Clade: Asterids
- Order: Asterales
- Family: Asteraceae
- Subfamily: Mutisioideae
- Tribe: Nassauvieae
- Genus: Acourtia; D.Don

Synonyms
- Perezia section Acourtia (D. Don) A. Gray; Clarionia D.Don

= Acourtia =

Genus of flowering plants

Acourtia is a genus of flowering plants in the family Asteraceae and was first described as a genus in 1830. It includes desertpeonies, such as Acourtia nana (dwarf desertpeony) and Acourtia runcinata (featherleaf desertpeony).

The genus name of Acourtia is in honour of Mary Elizabeth Catherine Gibbs à Court-Repington (1792–1878), an English noblewoman with botanical interests, who married Charles Ashe à Court-Repington.

Plants in this genus are native to the Southwestern United States (from Arizona, California, Nevada, New Mexico, Utah to Texas) and Mesoamerica (in Belize, El Salvador, Guatemala, Honduras and Mexico). They are diverse in appearance. The flowers are usually white, pink, or purple. Their flower heads are usually composed of only disc florets, though some are long and look like ray florets.

== Accepted species ==
81 species (as of January 2022),

- Acourtia bravohollisiana
- Acourtia butandae
- Acourtia caltepecana
- Acourtia carpholepis
- Acourtia carranzae
- Acourtia ciprianoi
- Acourtia cordata
- Acourtia coulteri
- Acourtia cuernavacana
- Acourtia dieringeri
- Acourtia discolor
- Acourtia dissiticeps
- Acourtia dugesii
- Acourtia durangensis
- Acourtia elizabethiae
- Acourtia erioloma
- Acourtia fragrans
- Acourtia fruticosa
- Acourtia gentryi
- Acourtia glandulifera
- Acourtia glomeriflora
- Acourtia gracilis
- Acourtia grandifolia
- Acourtia guatemalensis
- Acourtia hidalgoana
- Acourtia hintoniorum
- Acourtia hondurana
- Acourtia hooveri
- Acourtia huajuapana
- Acourtia humboldtii
- Acourtia intermedia
- Acourtia joaquinensis
- Acourtia lepidopoda
- Acourtia lobulata
- Acourtia longifolia
- Acourtia lozanii
- Acourtia macrocephala
- Acourtia macvaughii
- Acourtia matudae
- Acourtia mexiae
- Acourtia mexicana
- Acourtia michoacana
- Acourtia microcephala
- Acourtia moctezumae
- Acourtia molinana
- Acourtia moschata
- Acourtia nana
- Acourtia nelsonii
- Acourtia nudicaulis
- Acourtia nudiuscula
- Acourtia oaxacana
- Acourtia ovatifolia
- Acourtia oxylepis
- Acourtia palmeri
- Acourtia parryi
- Acourtia patens
- Acourtia pilulosa
- Acourtia pinetorum
- Acourtia platyphylla
- Acourtia platyptera
- Acourtia potosina
- Acourtia pringlei
- Acourtia pulchella
- Acourtia purpusii
- Acourtia reticulata
- Acourtia runcinata
- Acourtia rzedowskii
- Acourtia scapiformis
- Acourtia scaposa
- Acourtia simulata
- Acourtia sinaloana
- Acourtia souleana
- Acourtia tenoriensis
- Acourtia thurberi
- Acourtia tomentosa
- Acourtia turbinata
- Acourtia umbratalis
- Acourtia venturae
- Acourtia veracruzana
- Acourtia wislizeni
- Acourtia wrightii
- Acourtia zacatecana
