= Joseph A. Bonanno =

American optometrist

Joseph A. Bonanno is an American optometrist.

== Biography ==
Bonanno has a B.A in biology from the University of Pennsylvania (1975) and a master's degree in molecular biology (1977) from the University of California, Berkeley where he subsequently was awarded an O.D. (1981), and Ph.D. in physiological optics (1987). He was hired as a postdoc at the Louisiana State University where he worked from 1987 to 1988. Later on, he returned to Berkeley, where for a year he worked in the department of physiology and anatomy. In 1989 he became an assistant professor at the University of California, Berkeley School of Optometry and by 1997 became a professor. In July 1998 he became a faculty member of the Indiana University School of Optometry where as a professor he taught biochemistry and corneal physiology.

From January 2005 to August 2007 he was associate dean, and later held the same position at the Academic Affairs and Student Administration. In 2010, Bonanno became the Dean of the Indiana University School of Optometry.

He is a fellow of the American Academy of Optometry, and a member of the Association for Research in Vision and Ophthalmology and the American Physiological Society.
