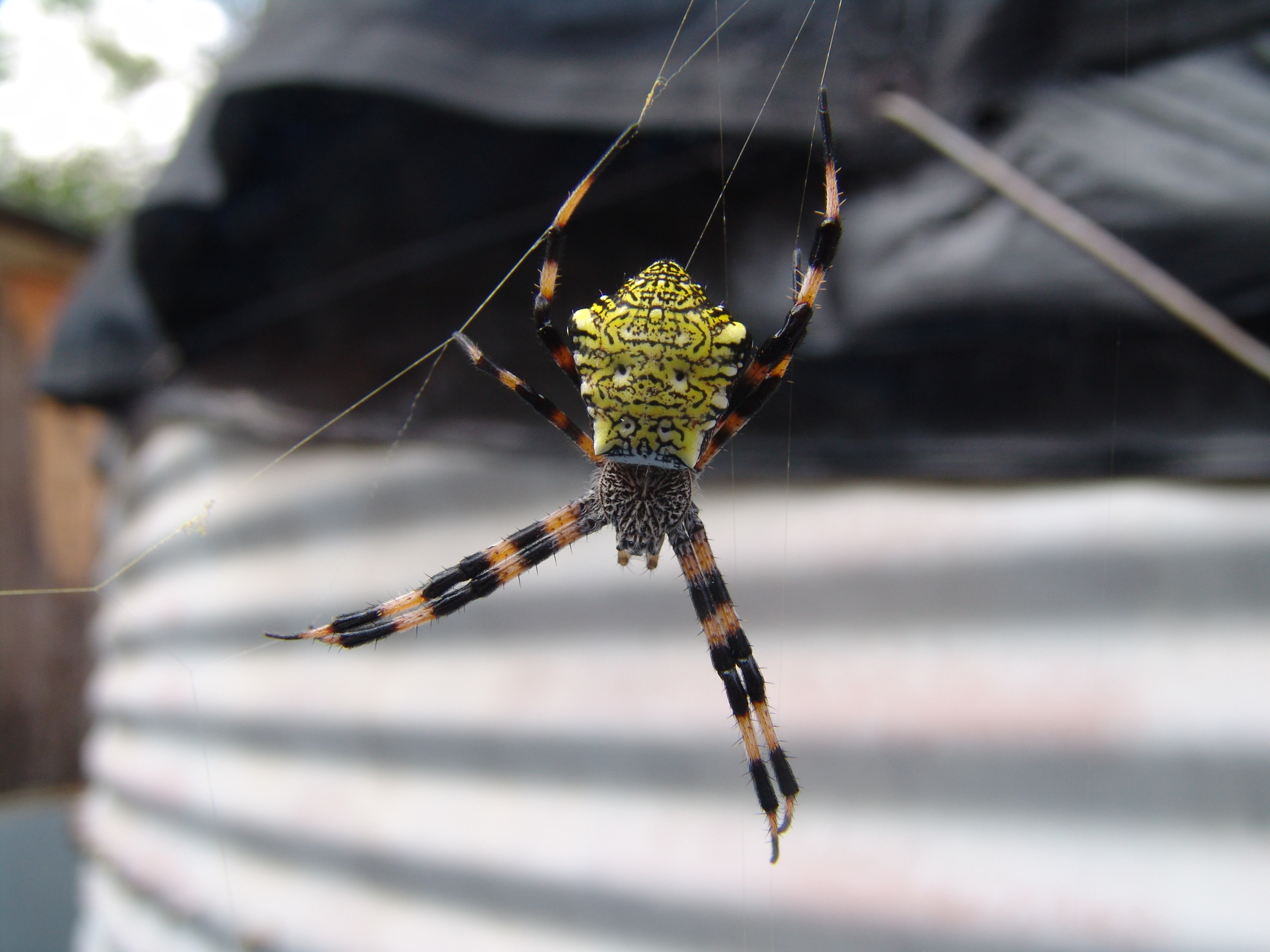
- female on Hawai'i (dorsal side)
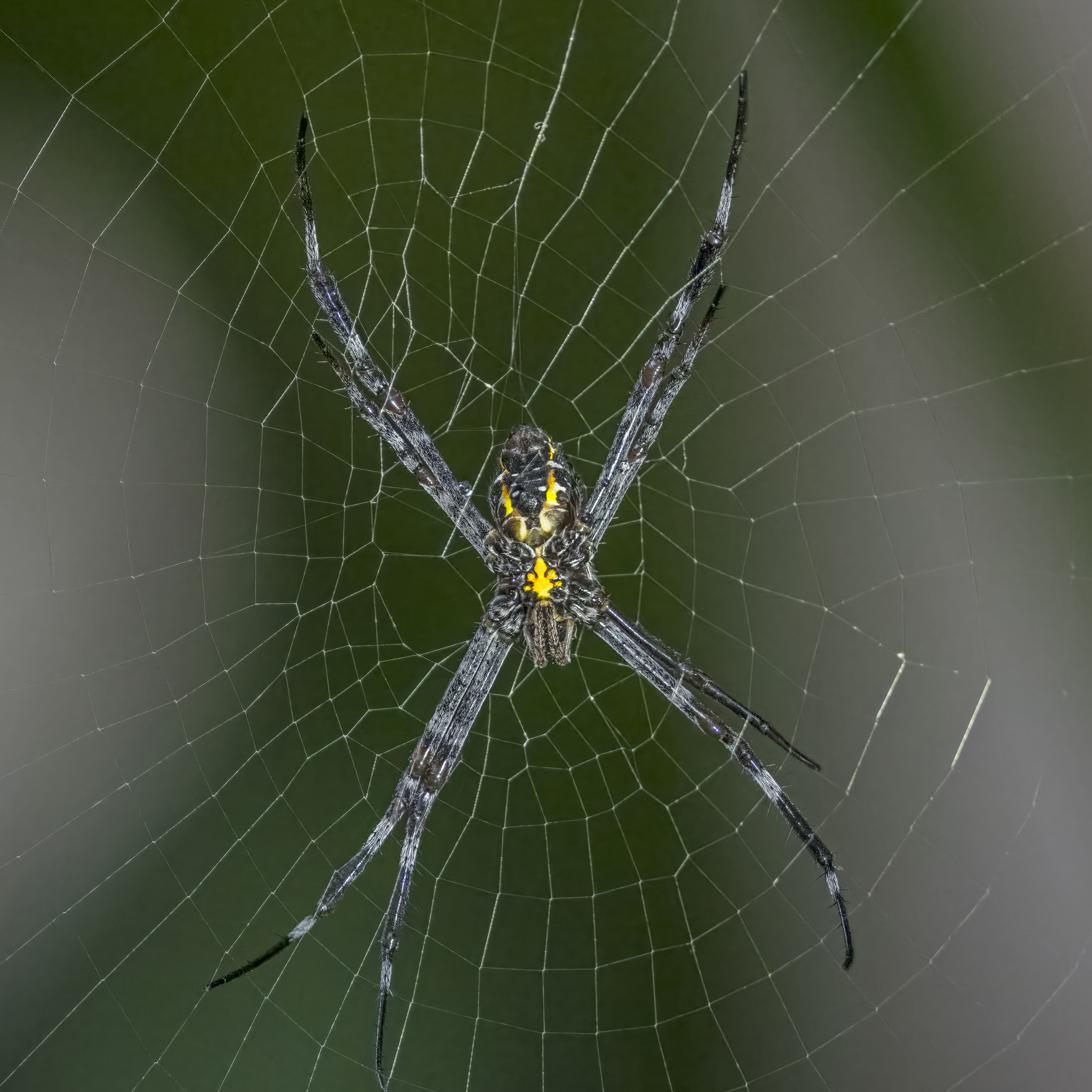
- female on Palau (ventral side}

Scientific classification
- Kingdom: Animalia
- Phylum: Arthropoda
- Subphylum: Chelicerata
- Class: Arachnida
- Order: Araneae
- Infraorder: Araneomorphae
- Family: Araneidae
- Genus: Argiope
- Species: A. appensa

Binomial name
- Argiope appensa (Walckenaer, 1841)

Synonyms
- Epeira appensa Walckenaer, 1841; Epeira crenulata Doleschall, 1857; Argiope chrysorrhoea L. Koch, 1871; Argiope crenulata (Doleschall, 1857); Coganargiope reticulata Kishida, 1936; Argiope schoenigi Marapao, 1965

= Argiope appensa =

Species of spider

Argiope appensa, also referred to as the Hawaiian garden spider or banana spider, is an orb-weaving spider belonging to the family Araneidae.

== Distribution and habitat ==
This species occurs on several islands in the western Pacific Ocean, in Hawaii and from Taiwan, Australia, New Caledonia, New Guinea to Indonesia.

It has been introduced to all main islands of Hawaii. It inhabits a wide variety of habitats, from coasts to upland forests. During the rainy season from June to November, this species is common in sunny edge areas, such as along roadsides and cultivated area.

== Description ==
This species shows an evident sexual dimorphism. The strikingly black and yellow females are 5.1–6.4 cm (2–2.5 in) long, including legs, while the brown males reach only about 1.9 cm (0.75 in).

On Guam, where Argiope appensa is ubiquitous, its web frequently visited by Argyrodes argentatus which steals uneaten food. For broader ecology, after the introduction of the brown tree snake and the subsequent extinction or near-extinction of many of the island's small birds, spider populations on Guam exploded in response to decreasing predation and competition. Nature writer David Quammen has called Argiope appensa "almost certainly one of the larger species" which were encountered in vast numbers during his research trip to Guam for the book The Song of the Dodo.

== Biology ==
Argiope appensa construct webs mainly in bushes, between branches, and in human constructions. The webs are rather large and show a white zig-zag silk decoration developed from one corner to the center of the web. These decorations, usually called stabilimenta, could be a warning device to prevent birds from inadvertently destroying the web.

== Gallery ==
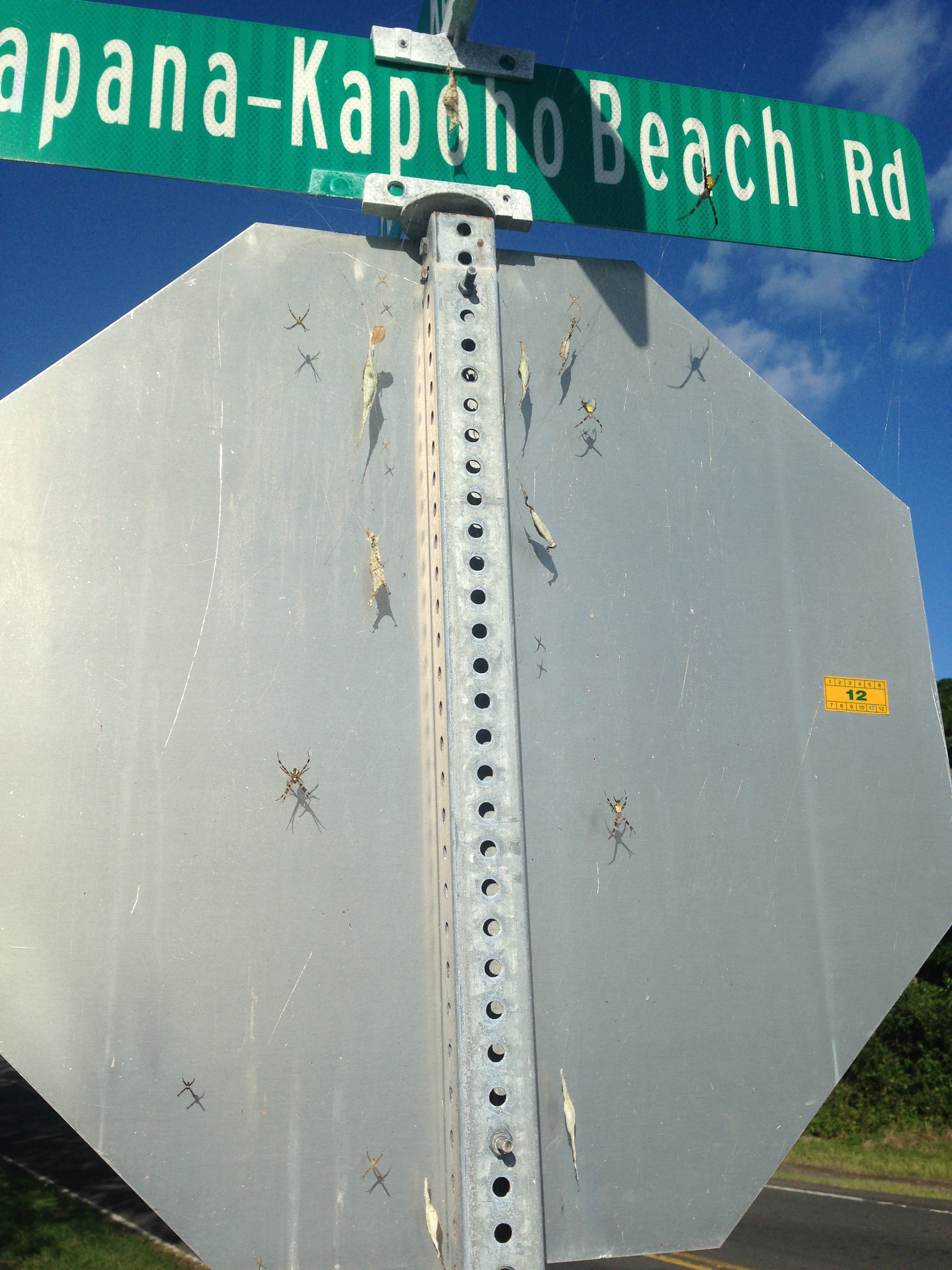
Community of multi-generational Argiope appensa on the Big Island of Hawaii

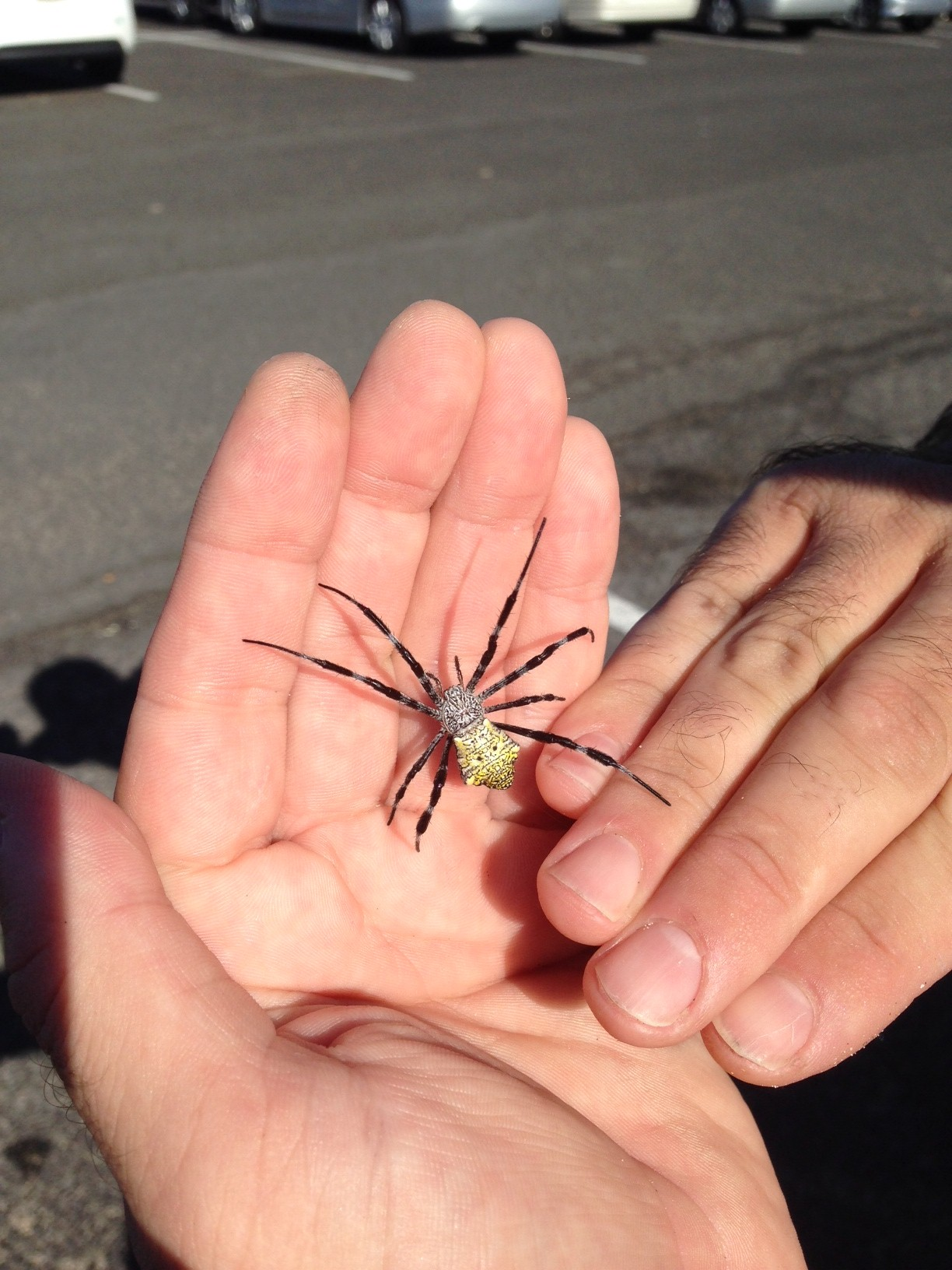
Mature female being handled in Hilo, Hawaii

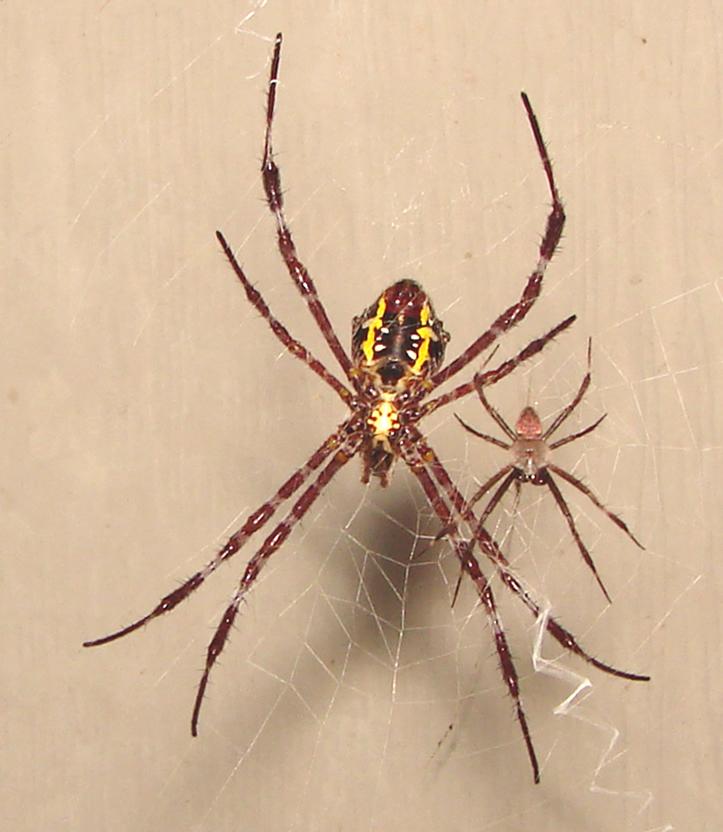
Mature female (ventral view) and male (dorsal)

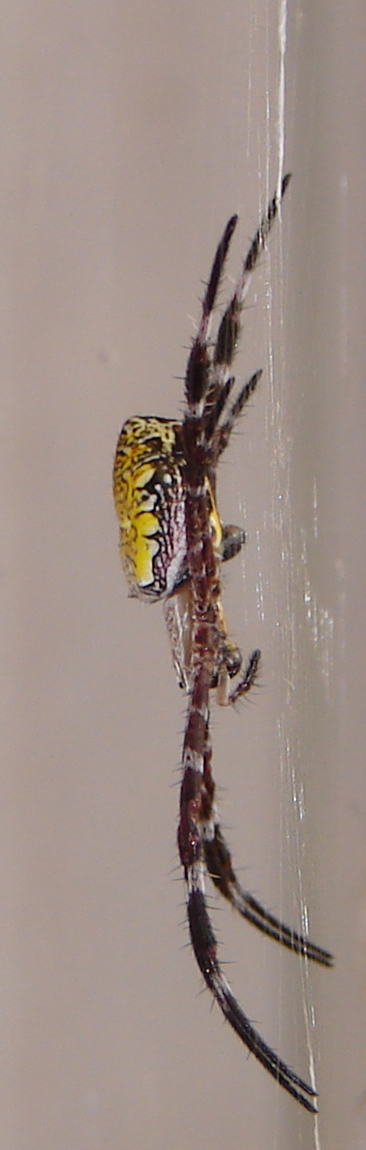
Side view of female

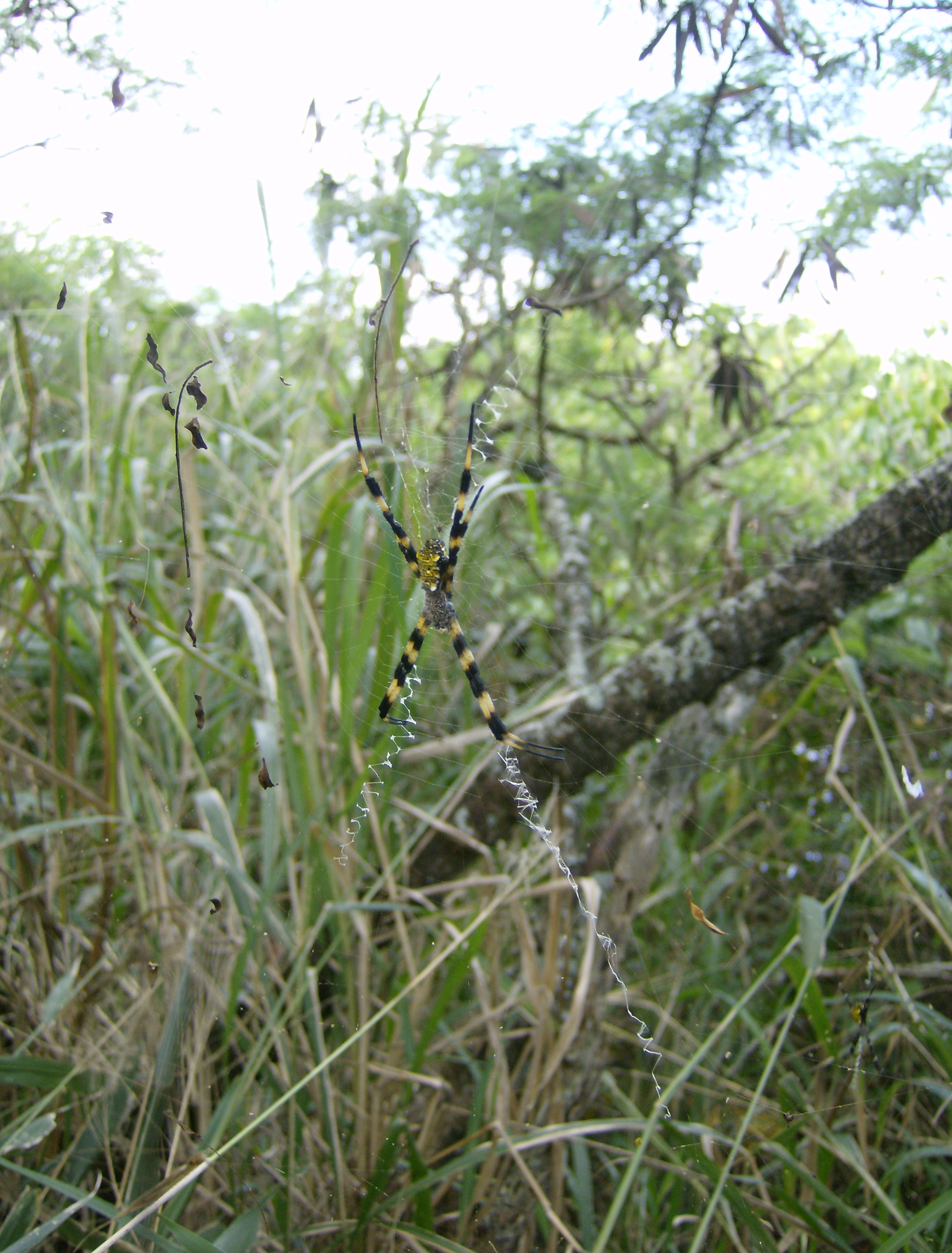
Female in Kauai Jungle, Hawaii

Female of Argiope appensa in Hawaii, ventral view. Video clip

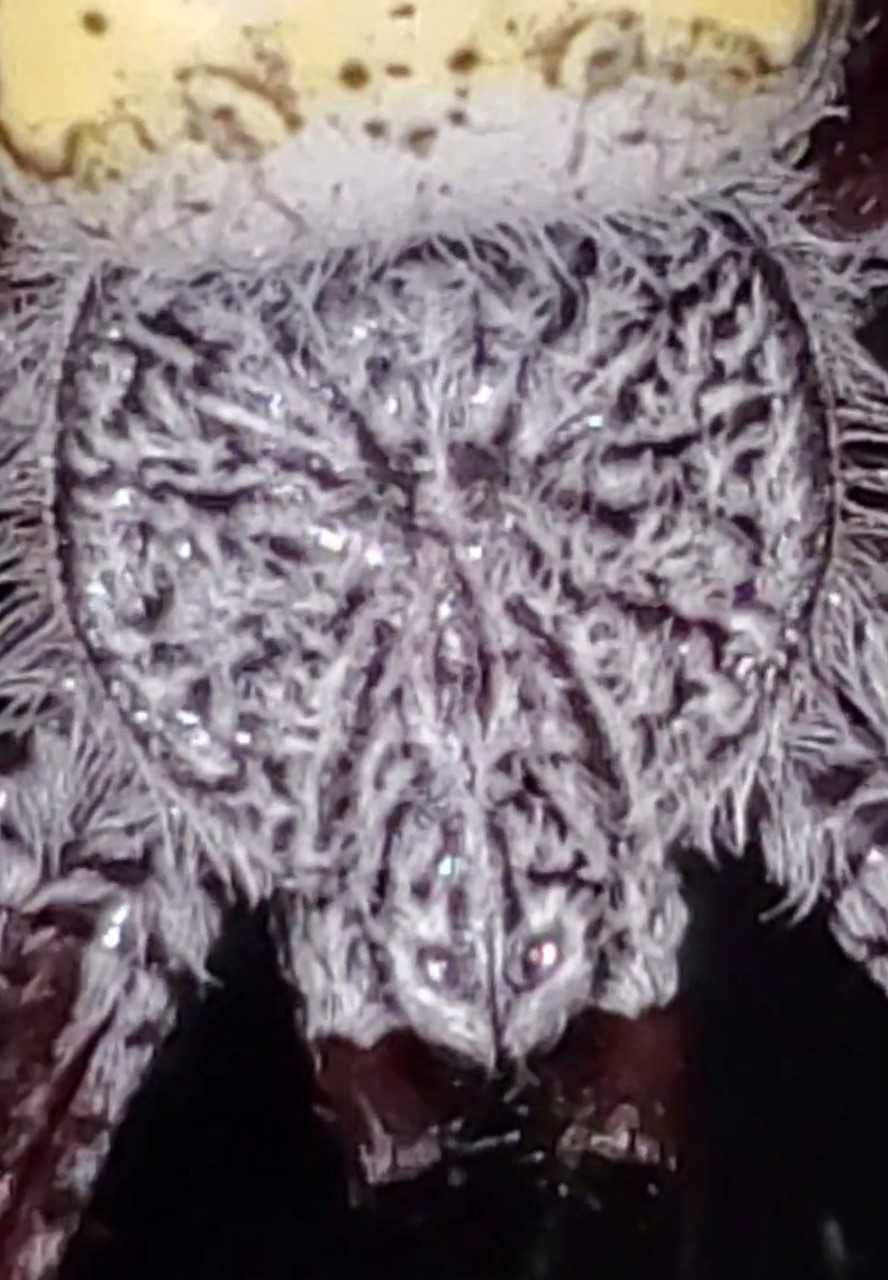
Detail of dorsum of thorax
