= Banana (magazine) =

- Categories: Asian American
- Frequency: Annual
- Founder: Vicki Ho; Kathleen Tso
- Founded: 2014
- Country: United States
- Based in: New York City
- Language: English
- Website: banana-mag.com

Banana is an Asian American themed magazine founded by Vicki Ho and Kathleen Tso. The magazine has its headquarters in Manhattan's Chinatown.

== Origins ==
Banana magazine was established in 2014. In an HuffPost interview, the co-founders of the magazine described the origins of the magazine's title, "The name "Banana" comes from a term common in East Asian communities. "The choice for the name Banana is meant to be an inside joke," the magazine's founders say.

"For anyone who has ever been called a 'banana,' you know that it’s a nickname that has been given to many first-generation Asians growing up in a western world, like us. It’s not meant to be derogatory, but celebratory," they write on the magazine's website."
