= Banana Man =

Banana Man may refer to:

== Comic books, TV and other media ==
- Bananaman, a British comic book and cartoon character
- Bananaman (TV series)
- Banana Man, a comic series created in 2000 most notable for showcasing the early artwork of the talented Chris Caldwell. published by Crack Comics

== Comedy ==
- Banana man, the funny man in a comedy double act
- The Banana Man, an American vaudeville performer
- Bananaman (comedy duo), a Japanese comedy duo

== Music ==
- Banana Man (album) (1997), by Ghoti Hook
- Bananamen, side-project of London group The Sting-rays
- "Banana Man", a song by the band Tally Hall, from their 2005 album Marvin's Marvelous Mechanical Museum

== People ==
- Sam Zemurray (nicknamed "Sam the Banana Man"), a U.S. businessman who made his fortune in the banana trade
- Ray Comfort, Christian evangelist and prominent creationist, derisively nicknamed "Banana Man" after his argument that the banana disproves evolution gained notoriety
- Matt Banahan (nicknamed Banana Man), England rugby winger

== Other ==
- "Hombre Banano" (Banana Man), the nickname of a wall mural painted by Blu
- The Dancing Banana emoticon, an Internet phenomenon also known as "Banana Man"
- In mathematics, the category of Banach analytic manifolds is sometimes denoted by BanAnaMan
- Banana Man, a character in the animated series Adventure Time
