= Banana (2024 video game) =

2024 video game

- Engine: Unity
- Platform: Windows
- Release: 23 April 2024
- Genre: Clicker game
- Mode: Single-player

Banana is a 2024 free-to-play clicker game released through Steam. The game consists of an image of a banana, which increments a counter whenever clicked. Released by a team of four developers in April 2024, Banana is based on an earlier clicker game titled Egg. Like Egg, the game's primary purpose is to periodically grant items to players which can be bought and sold on the Steam Marketplace. Although the vast majority of the banana items only sell for a few U.S. cents, rarer bananas can sell for much higher, with the highest known sale reaching a price of US$1,378.58. The game has generated controversy, with some calling it a scam.

== Gameplay ==
The gameplay of Banana consists of incrementing a counter by clicking an image of a banana on a green background. An achievement, "Click", is unlocked when the game is left open for one minute. The extremely minimal gameplay exists to facilitate the creation of banana Steam items, which are periodically given to players upon playing for one minute and clicking occasionally; clicking repeatedly merely increments the timer, and does not lead to other effects. A common banana item can be obtained every three hours, while rarer bananas can be obtained on an eighteen hour timer. The bananas, like items in other games released through Steam, can be bought and sold on the Steam Marketplace.

== Release and economy ==
The game was released through Steam on 23 April 2024. Created by an international team of four developers, it was heavily based on an earlier game titled Egg; like Banana, the gameplay consists only an image of an egg which can be clicked, periodically generating Steam items, which consist of reskinned bananas. One of the game's developers described Banana as "pretty much a stupid game, a copy of Egg but way worse."

Prices on individual bananas are generally only a few U.S. cents, although some bananas have sold for hundreds of U.S. dollars. An item titled the Special Golden Banana sold on the Steam Marketplace for US$1,378.58, the highest recorded sale price of any item in the game. The game was described as an "infinite money glitch" by a developer. Although free-to-play, Banana features an online store where five different banana variations can be purchased for 25 U.S. cents each. The banana items generated by the game have been compared to non-fungible tokens, although differ due to the lack of a blockchain. Due to the extremely minimal gameplay and low computer resource usage, some players have been able to run large numbers of alternate accounts simultaneously to maximize profit.

Player counts for the game were initially very low after release, not exceeding 300 players during its first week of release. In late May 2024 its player count had exceeded 30,000 active players, becoming the 47th most played game on Steam. By the beginning of June, it had reached 141,000 concurrent players. This number rapidly increased over the following weeks, exceeding 250,000 by June 10. However, the significant botting problems led to inflate player counts — a lead developer stated that around two-thirds of players were bots in early June. By June 14, the number of simultaneously active players reached 420,000, and further rose to 700,000 over the following day, becoming the 2nd most played game on Steam (behind Counter-Strike 2).

The game has generated controversy since its rise on Steam. Both the hosting platform Steam and the game's developers take a percentage of every Banana transaction on the Steam marketplace. Some commentators accused the game of being a scam, which the developers have denied. Carlos Morales of IGN wrote that the game is "not technically a scam", but functions to create an artificial economy through useless items, profitable to both Steam and the game's developers.

== See also ==
- Cookie Clicker
