= Banana Lake =

- Location of Banana LAke in Florida Location of Banana Lake in the USA
- Location: Lakeland, Florida
- Coordinates: 27.9785°N 81.9023°W
- Lake type: natural freshwater lake
- Basin countries: United States
- Max. length: 1.04-mile (1.67 km)
- Max. width: 0.56-mile (0.90 km)
- Surface area: 268 acres (108 ha)
- Average depth: 4 ft (1 m)
- Max. depth: 7 ft (2 m)
- Water volume: 329,100,230 US gallons (1.2457799×10^{9} L)
- Surface elevation: 89 feet (27 m)
- Islands: numerous islets along coasts

Banana Lake or is a 268-acre (1,080,000 m^{2}) natural freshwater lake in southeast Lakeland, Florida. Before 1860 this lake was called Mud Lake. A family homesteaded at the lake and planted bananas, amongst other types of fruit. By 1890 the lake was known by its current name. Banana Lake is in a suburban area. Residential areas and agricultural areas surround it. To the southwest 200 feet (61 m) is Little Banana Lake. Lake Stahl is 400 feet (120 m) to the northwest. Just to the north of Lake Stahl is the Sanlan Golf Course, which also borders Banana Lake.

On the south shore of the lake is Banana Lake Park, which has an address of 5002 Tillery Road. This park contains picnic shelters and tables, a paved walking trail, restrooms, a playground, a boat ramp and a fishing pier. A parking lot is at the west side of the park. Boats can reach Lake Stahl via a canal that connects the two lakes.
