= Banana Island (disambiguation) =

Banana Island, Lagos is an artificial island off the foreshore of Ikoyi, Lagos, Nigeria.

Banana Island may also refer to:

- Banana Island (Johor), an island in Malaysia
- Banana Island (Qatar), an artificial island off the coast of Doha
- Banana Island Provincial Park, a provincial park in British Columbia, Canada
- Banana Islands, a group of islands off the coast of Yawri Bay, Sierra Leone
- one of the Calamian Islands, Philippines
- Hon Chuoi, an island of Cà Mau Province, Vietnam
- Île Banane, a bridge over the Saint-Maurice River, Quebec, Canada
