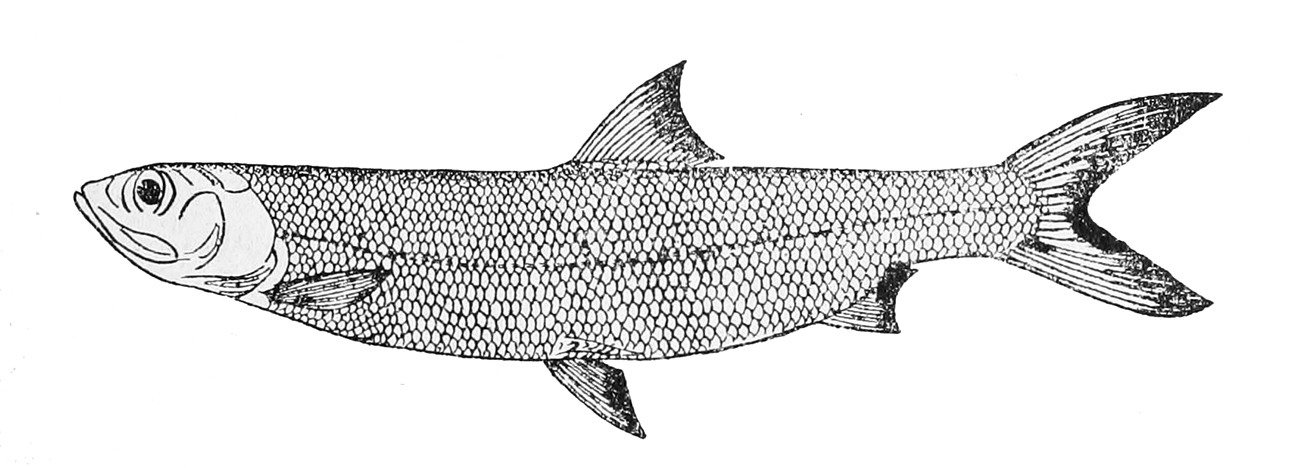

Conservation status
- Least Concern (IUCN 3.1)

Scientific classification
- Kingdom: Animalia
- Phylum: Chordata
- Class: Actinopterygii
- Order: Elopiformes
- Family: Elopidae
- Genus: Elops
- Species: E. lacerta

Binomial name
- Elops lacerta Valenciennes, 1847

Synonyms
- Alloelops lacertus (Valenciennes 1847); Elops congicus Boulenger 1898

= West African ladyfish =

Species of ray-finned fish

The West African ladyfish (Elops lacerate) is a species of ray-finned fish in the family Elopidae. It is native to the coastal waters of the eastern Atlantic Ocean, from Senegal to Angola. It is also known as the Guinean ladyfish. Some have been known to grow to 20 lb (9.1 kg).

== Threats ==
This species uses estuarine areas and hypersaline lagoons; changes in the quality of these habitats may affect this species' population dynamics. Although this species may not be closely associated with any single habitat, it may be adversely affected by development and urbanization.
