= Banana (1986 video game) =

1986 video game

- Cover art
- Developer: Victor Musical Industries
- Publisher: Victor Musical Industries
- Platform: Family Computer
- Release: JP: September 8, 1986
- Genre: Puzzle
- Mode: Single-player

Banana (バナナ) is a fixed screen puzzle video game produced by Victor Musical Industries that was released exclusively for the Family Computer in Japan in 1986.

== Gameplay ==
Before clearing a stage, the player has to retrieve his daughter-in-law.

The player controls a mole which digs through dirt collecting various fruits and vegetables. In most stages, the produce must be collected in a specific order, or the player may become stuck and be forced to restart the stage. During the stages, the player must also retrieve a female mole, referred to in the instruction manual as the player's daughter-in-law. When all objectives are complete, the player must leave through the exit. If the player dies, the character says something along the lines of "I'm beat."

Among the fruits the player must collect are bananas. These are special fruits which give the player one of four items: a bomb, a ladder segment, a rope, or a rock. These may be used to free a stuck player following a misstep. If a player walks under a rock, that rock shakes. When the player moves out from under the rock, the rock and any rocks on top of it fall. The player cannot die from a falling rock, but may become stuck a rock blocks the exit.

There are 105 stages in Banana. Both of the final stages of the game loop from left to right, meaning that it is possible to quickly warp from one part of the level to another. Each stage progressively becomes more difficult. At the end of each stage, the number of steps the player took is totaled. This step count negatively affects the total score.

Players can design their own levels. All the produce that is available in the game can be used and the size of the map can be controlled. With the original Famicom system, players can save their creations to a specially formatted cassette tape. After completing the design, players can immediately play in their new creation.
