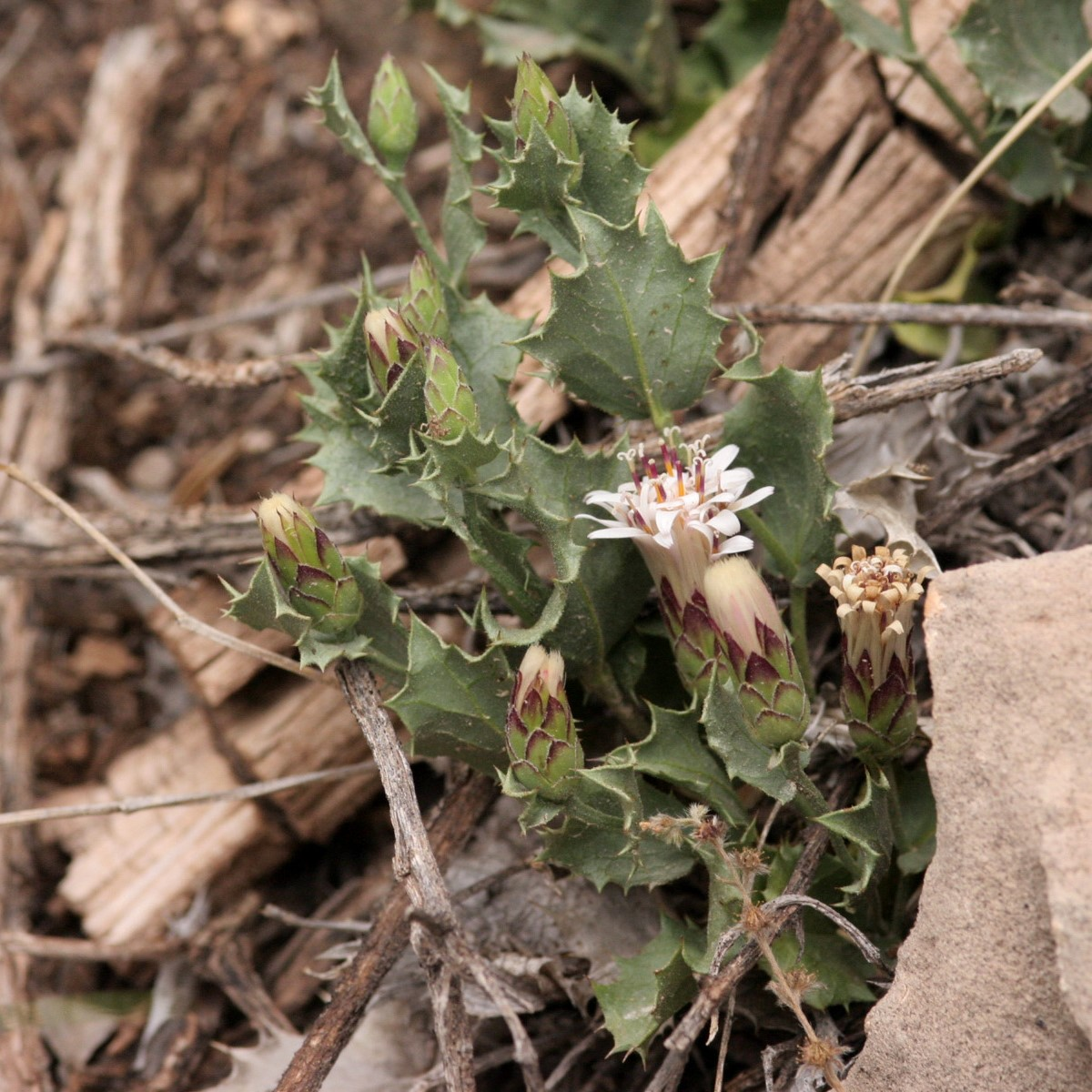

Conservation status
- Secure (NatureServe)

Scientific classification
- Kingdom: Plantae
- Clade: Tracheophytes
- Clade: Angiosperms
- Clade: Eudicots
- Clade: Asterids
- Order: Asterales
- Family: Asteraceae
- Genus: Acourtia
- Species: A. nana

Binomial name
- Acourtia nana (A.Gray) Reveal & R.M.King

Synonyms
- Perezia nana A.Gray

= Acourtia nana =

Species of flowering plant

Acourtia nana, the desert holly or dwarf desertpeony, is a North American species of perennial plants in the family Asteraceae. found in the Sonoran and Chihuahuan Desert regions of the south-western United States (Arizona, New Mexico, Texas) and northern Mexico (Chihuahua, Coahuila, Nuevo León, San Luis Potosí, Sonora, Zacatecas).

Flowers, uncommonly seen, have a scent similar to jasmine or violets.
