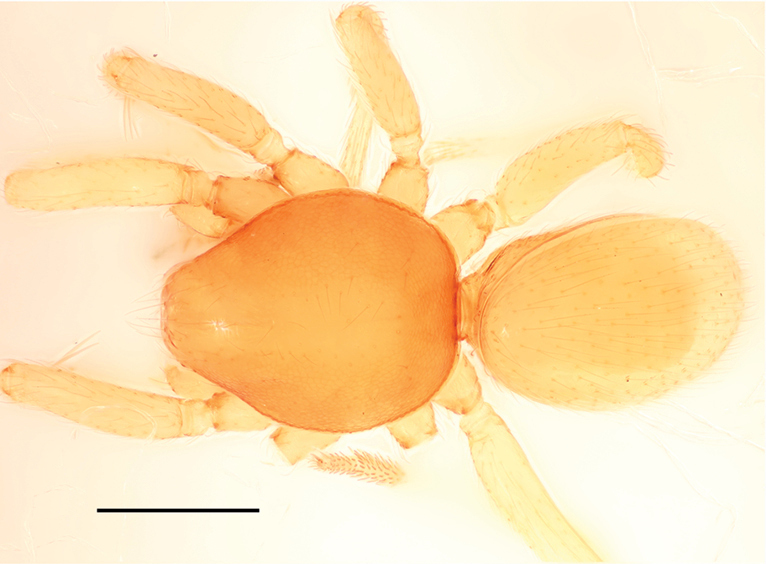
- Bannana crassispina, male specimen

Scientific classification
- Kingdom: Animalia
- Phylum: Arthropoda
- Subphylum: Chelicerata
- Class: Arachnida
- Order: Araneae
- Infraorder: Araneomorphae
- Family: Oonopidae
- Genus: Bannana; Tong & Li, 2015

Species
- Bannana crassispina; Bannana parvula
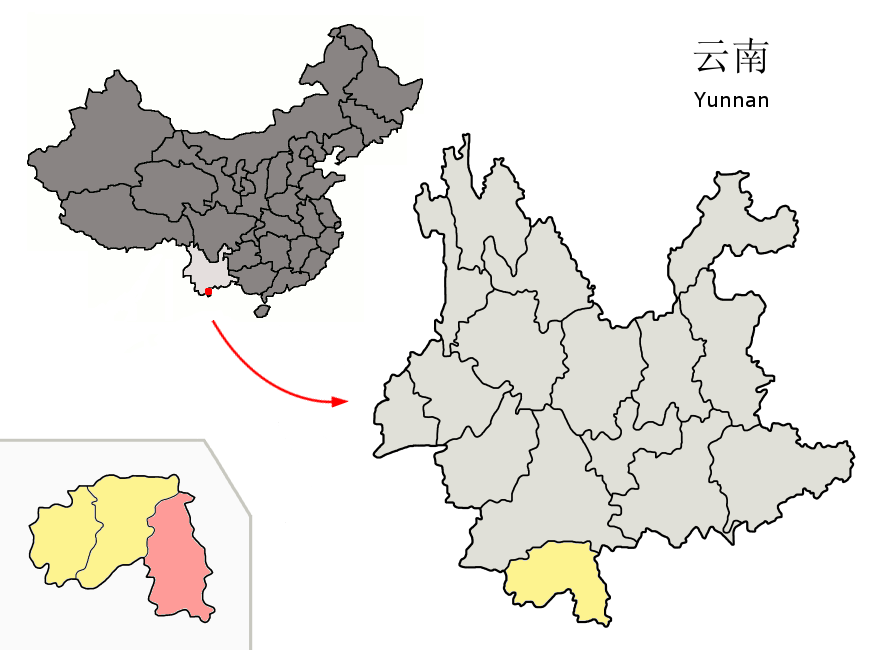
- Location of Mengla County (pink) within Xishuangbanna (yellow) and Yunnan (light grey)

= Bannana =

Genus of spiders

Bannana is a genus of goblin spiders (family Oonopidae) native to Xishuangbanna prefecture, Yunnan Province, China, where it lives in the leaf-litter of tropical rainforest. There are two known species: Bannana crassispina and B. parvula, both described in 2015. Individuals are pale yellow and unpatterned, and range from around 1.0 to 1.8 mm in body length, with females being slightly larger than males. The eyes are reduced or entirely absent. Known only from a nature reserve in Xishuangbanna, Bannana belongs to a group of Asian goblin spiders known as the "Dysderoides complex", that ranges from China to Pakistan and south to Indonesia.

== Description ==
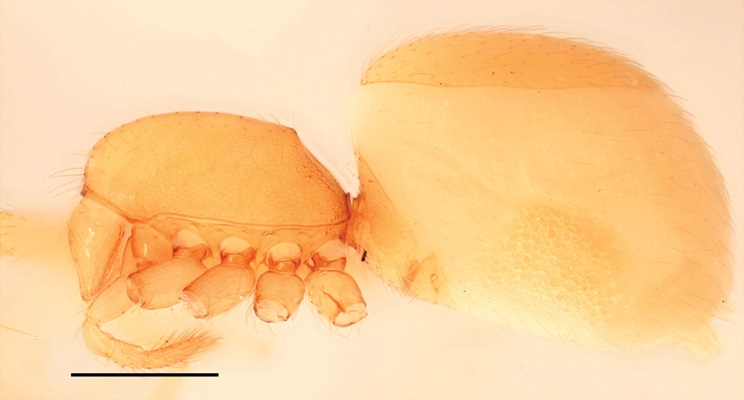
Side view of female B. crassispina specimen showing sclerotized abdominal scutum. Scale bar=0.4 mm

Species of Bannana are generally similar in overall appearance, although B. parvula is smaller. The body color is yellow, without pattern. Eyes are absent or highly reduced, visible only as remnants in B. crassispina. The cephalothorax or prosoma is broadly oval when viewed from above, and the abdomen or opisthosoma is somewhat oval-shaped, and rounded at the rear. A strongly hardened plate (scutum) covers the upper abdominal surface.

B. crassipina males are around 1.5 mm in body length (tip of the cephalothorax to end of the abdomen), while females are slightly larger at 1.8 mm. B. parvula are smaller, with males and females measuring around 1.0 and 1.1 mm, respectively. In addition to size, male B. crassispina can be distinguished from male B. parvula by the presence of two large bristles (setae) on the palpal tibiae (the penultimate segments of the pedipalps) and two rows of setae on the sternum (the ventral portion of the cephalothorax). Females can be distinguished by a relatively smaller abdominal scutum in B. crassispina.

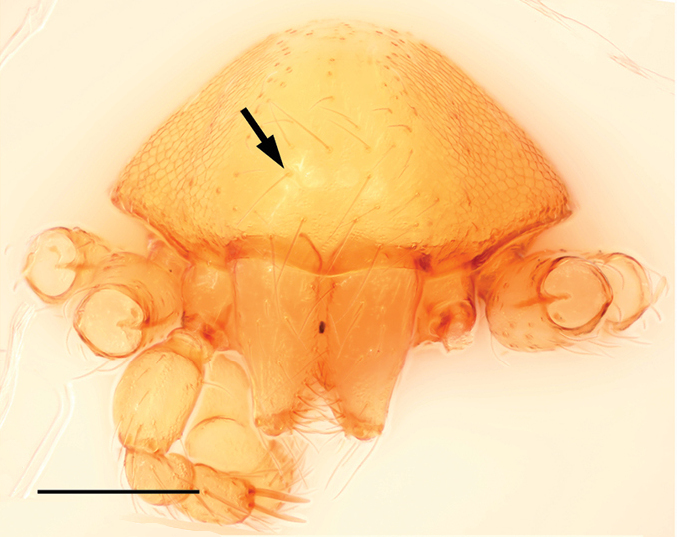
B. crassispina has reduced eyes (arrow).

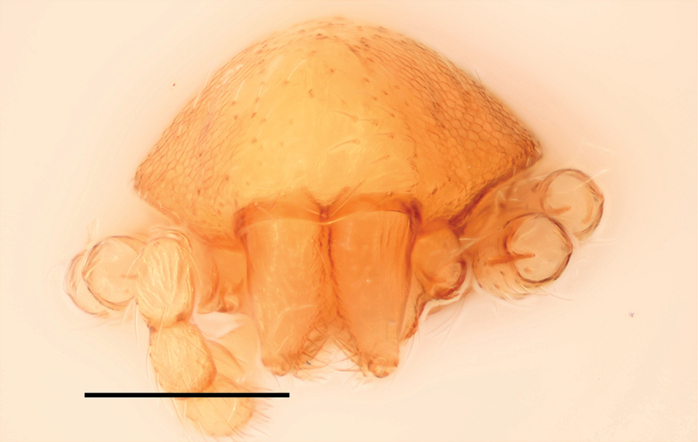
B. parvula lacks eyes completely.

Scale bars=0.2 mm

== Distribution and habitat ==
Bannana spiders are known from Menglun Nature Reserve, in Xishuangbanna's Mengla County, where they are found in leaf litter of tropical rainforest at elevations around 640 m (2,100 ft) above sea level. Specimens have been collected by pitfall trapping and by manually sorting through litter.

== Etymology ==
The genus name Bannana is derived from the last few letters of the word "Xishuangbanna". The specific name crassispina is derived from Latin crassus ("thick") and spinus ("bristle"), referring to two thick bristles on the tibiae of male pedipalps, while the specific name parvula, from Latin parvus ("small"), refers to the smaller size of this species. Both species, as well as the genus, were named in 2015 by Chinese biologists Yanfeng Tong and Shuqiang Li.

== Classification ==
Bannana spiders are in the family Oonopidae, a large family of spiders with over 1,500 species worldwide. Within the Oonopidae, Bannana is placed in a lineage called the "Dysderoides complex", which also contains the genera Dysderoides, Himalayana, and Trilacuna, and spans a large part of Asia from Pakistan to China and south to Sumatra. The "Dysderoides complex" is united by shared similarities of the mouth parts and male reproductive structures. Morphologically, Bannana is very similar to Dysderoides, which also has reduced eyes.
