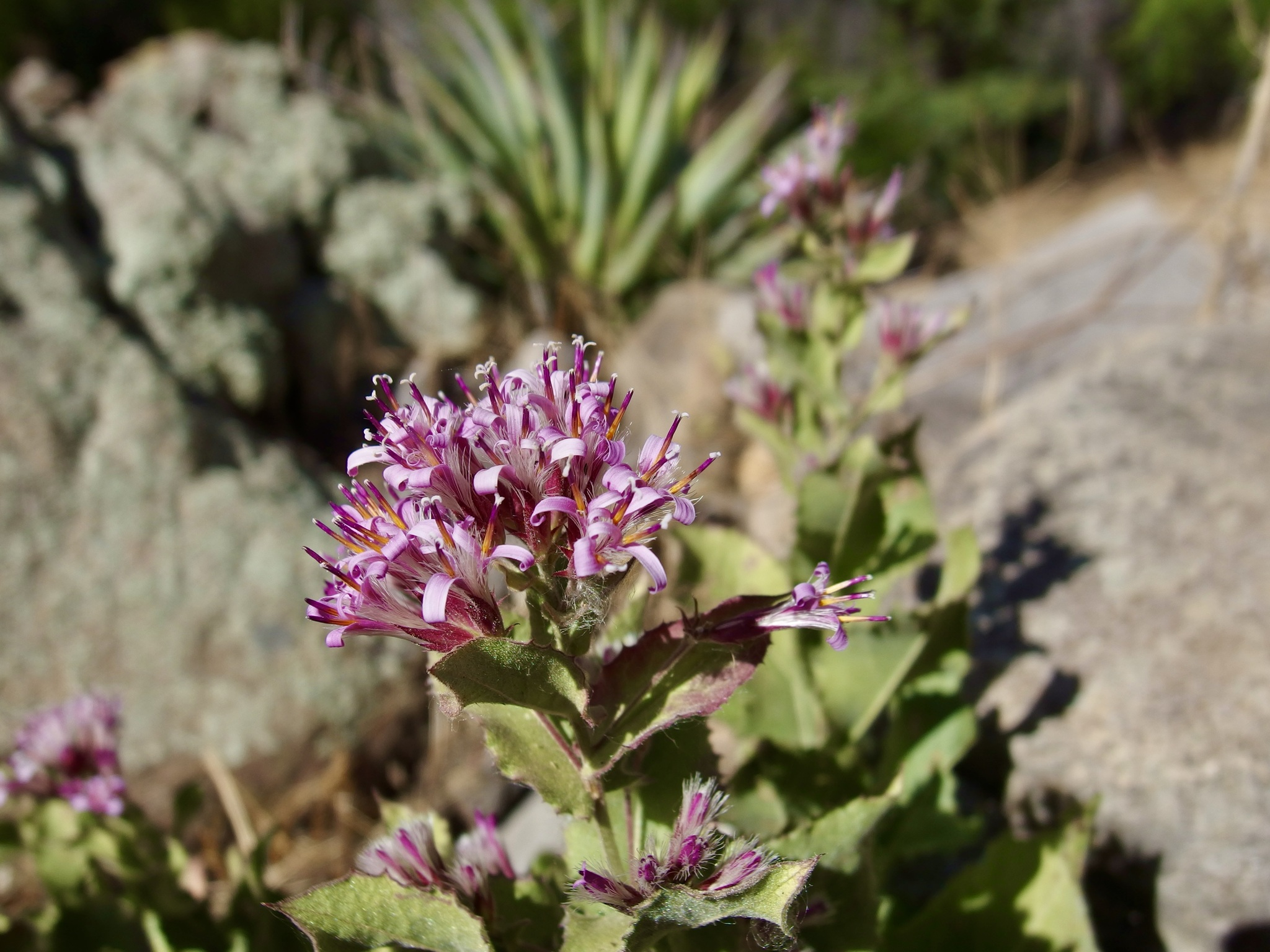

Scientific classification
- Kingdom: Plantae
- Clade: Tracheophytes
- Clade: Angiosperms
- Clade: Eudicots
- Clade: Asterids
- Order: Asterales
- Family: Asteraceae
- Genus: Acourtia
- Species: A. thurberi

Binomial name
- Acourtia thurberi (A. Gray) Reveal & R.M. King

Synonyms
- Perezia thurberi A.Gray

= Acourtia thurberi =

Species of flowering plant

Acourtia thurberi, or Thurber's desertpeony, is a North American species of plant in the family Asteraceae. It is native to the Sonoran and Chihuahuan Desert regions in northern Mexico (Chihuahua, Sonora, Durango) and the southwestern United States (Arizona, New Mexico).
