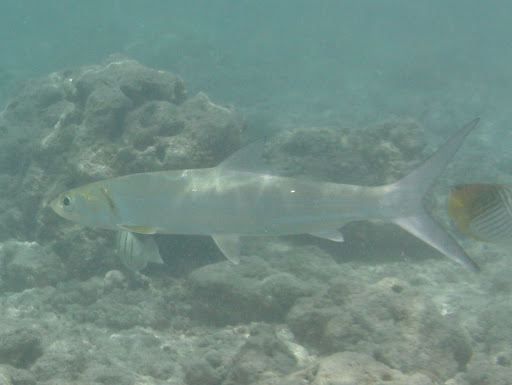

Conservation status
- Data Deficient (IUCN 3.1)

Scientific classification
- Kingdom: Animalia
- Phylum: Chordata
- Class: Actinopterygii
- Order: Elopiformes
- Family: Elopidae
- Genus: Elops
- Species: E. hawaiensis

Binomial name
- Elops hawaiensis Regan, 1909

Synonyms
- Elops australis Regan 1909; Gularus australis (Regan 1909)

= Elops hawaiensis =

Species of fish

The Hawaiian ladyfish (Elops hawaiensis), also known as the Hawaiian tenpounder or banana fish, is a species of ray-finned fish in the family Elopidae. It is sometimes referred to as the giant herring, though it is not closely related to the true herrings of the family Clupeidae. Its Hawaiian name is awa 'aua. It is native to the west central Pacific Ocean, and the current classification may in fact consist of several species.

== Description ==
With an elongated body, enormous eyes, and a formidable mouth, Elops hawaiensis is a striking sight to behold. Its head and body gleam with a silvery-white sheen, almost like polished metal, with a captivating bluish tint glistening along the back. The eyes, with their inky black pupils, are surrounded by transparent, glass-like tissue. The tips of the dorsal and caudal fins are tinged with a striking black, giving them a dramatic flair. The pectoral, pelvic, and anal fins are partially see-through, bathed in a delicate yellowish hue that catches the light in a mesmerizing way.

When hooked, it performs an acrobatic display reminiscent of a tarpon, leaping out of the water with impressive force. Despite its size, reaching up to 24 inches and 22 pounds, its flesh is dry and bony, rarely consumed except when transformed into fishcakes. This enigmatic fish continues to intrigue and challenge anglers across its vast range, captivating the imagination of those who encounter it.

== Distribution and habitat ==
Elops hawaiensis has an impressive distribution, found in the waters of Australia, Hawaii, and the Philippines. In Australia, this species thrives in both tropical and subtropical waters. On the east coast, its range stretches down to the bustling city of Sydney, while on the west coast, it reaches as far south as the scenic town of Albany. Even in the relatively quiet waters of South Australia, a few specimens have made their appearance, adding to the intrigue of this widespread species.

In the mysterious waters of the Eastern Indian Ocean, stretching all the way to Japan, Hawaii, and Polynesia, an elusive predator prowls.This fascinating creature avoids shallow bays and harbors, preferring the deeper waters where it hunts other fish with precision.

== Threats ==
This species uses estuarine areas and hypersaline lagoons; changes in the quality of these habitats may affect this species' population dynamics. Although this species may not be closely associated with any single habitat, it may be adversely affected by development and urbanization.
