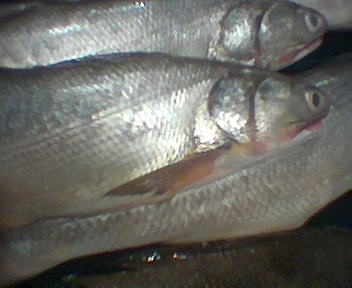

Conservation status
- Least Concern (IUCN 3.1)

Scientific classification
- Kingdom: Animalia
- Phylum: Chordata
- Class: Actinopterygii
- Division: Teleostei
- Order: Elopiformes
- Family: Elopidae
- Genus: Elops
- Species: E. machnata

Binomial name
- Elops machnata (Forsskål, 1775)

Synonyms
- Argentina machnata Forsskål 1775; Elops indicus Swainson 1839; Elops capensis Smith 1838-47; Elops purpurascens Richardson 1846

= Elops machnata =

Species of ray-finned fish

Elops machnata, the tenpounder, is a species of ray-finned fish in the family Elopidae in the order Elopiformes (tarpons and tenpounders). This species is found in coastal regions of the Indian Ocean.

== Possible threats ==
This species uses estuarine areas and hypersaline lagoons; changes in the quality of these habitats may affect this species' population dynamics. Although this species may not be closely associated with any single habitat, it may be adversely affected by development and urbanization.
