= Banana boat (food) =

Dessert made of banana

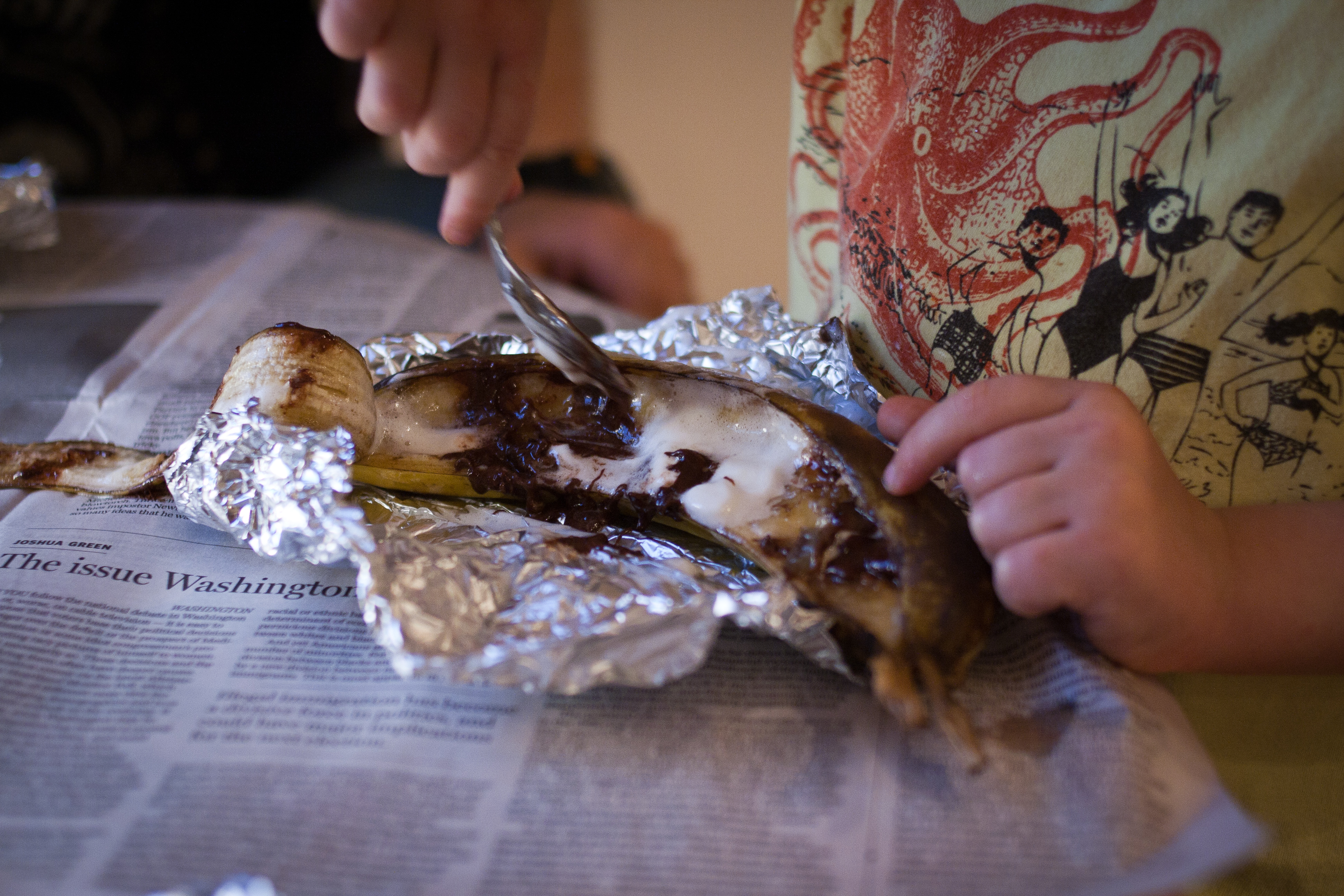
- Main ingredients: Banana, chocolate, marshmallows

A banana boat is a traditional campfire treat consisting of a banana cut lengthwise and stuffed with marshmallow and chocolate, then wrapped in aluminium foil and cooked in the embers left over from a campfire. Sometimes the banana boat is topped with caramel sauce prior to cooking. The banana boat is sometimes referred to as a hybrid between a banana split and a s'more.

== See also ==
- S'more
- Sundae
- List of stuffed dishes
