= Banana Joe =

American actor

Joe Montione
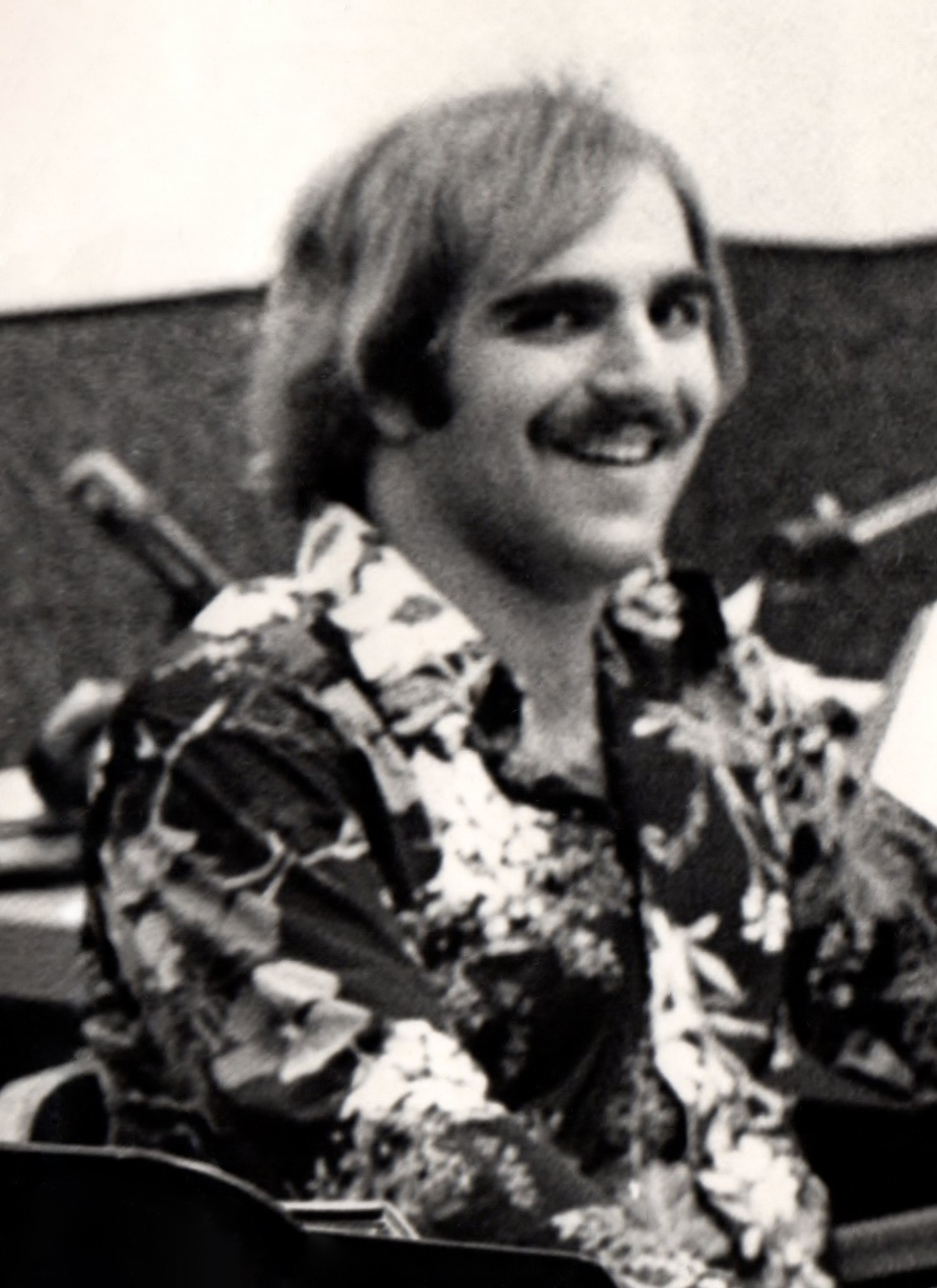
- Born: January 21, 1954; Hartford, Connecticut, U.S.
- Died: September 11, 2021 (aged 67); Los Angeles, California, U.S.
- Occupation: radio personality.

Joe Montione, commonly referred to as Banana Joe, (January 21, 1954 – September 11, 2021) was a radio personality.

== Early career ==
Montione grew up in Pittston, PA, about 100 miles north of Philadelphia. He first worked as a DJ at King's College station WRKC-FM. He then began his commercial DJ career at WILK-AM Wilkes-Barre, eventually being hired at Philadelphia's WFIL. He also worked at other stations, including Y100/Miami, CHUM/Toronto, WLOF/Orlando and in 1979 moving to Los Angeles to work at KHJ radio.

== Later career ==
Montione later returned to Pennsylvania at WILK radio/Wilkes-Barre as Program Director/Afternoon Drive personality. It was there he formed an investment group, and in 1983 purchased WHTF-FM York, PA, and in 1984 bought WTLQ-FM/Wilkes-Barre-Scranton, PA.

After selling his interest in both stations in 1988, Montione moved back to Los Angeles. In 1991 he premiered the Banana Joe Flashback show on KIIS-FM. Montione also became National Programming/Marketing Director for Premiere Radio Networks and launched a station in Denver and later at WUSA Tampa and KTXQ in Dallas. Joe returned to Los Angeles in 2003, forming the Banana Joe Radio Group launching Internet station Flashbacktop40.com in 2005. In addition to FT40, Montione is Senior VP for satellite replacement company Synchronicity.co, featuring new platforms and automation systems for radio. The 70s, 80s, 90s Hits format that make up Flashback Top-40, is now in syndication to terrestrial radio in addition to the online version.
