= Lantana trifolia =

Scientific classification
- Kingdom: Plantae
- Clade: Tracheophytes
- Clade: Angiosperms
- Clade: Eudicots
- Clade: Asterids
- Order: Lamiales
- Family: Verbenaceae
- Genus: Lantana
- Species: L. trifolia

Binomial name
- Lantana trifolia L., 1753

Species of plant

Lantana trifolia is a species of shrub in the family of Verbenaceae which is native to Central and South America but also has been introduced in parts of Sub-Saharan Africa and South/Southeast Asia. It bears beautiful flowers and small edible fruit. Its roots and leaves have been used in traditional ethnomedicines against a large variety of diseases.
