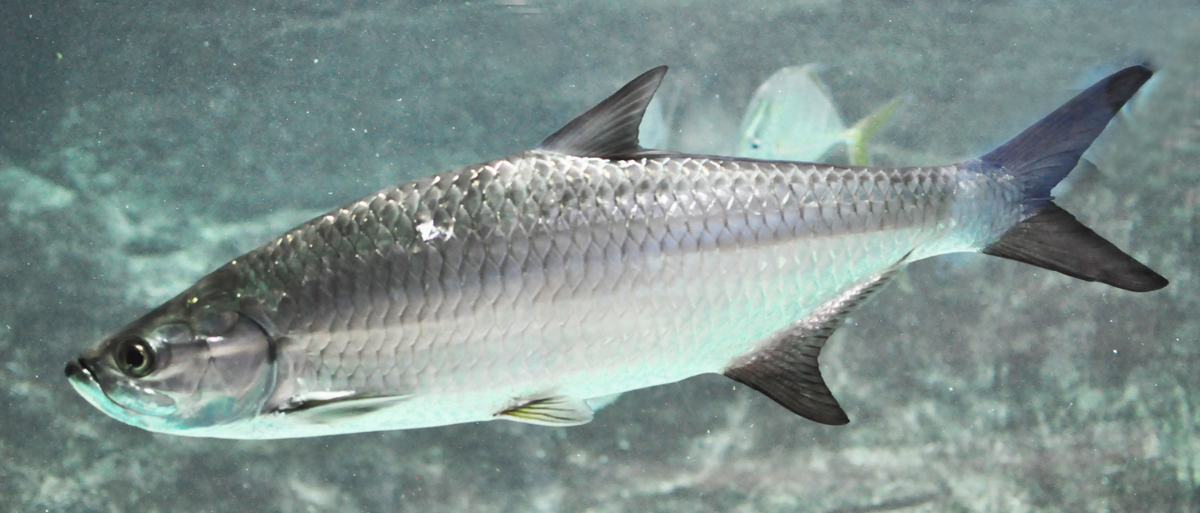
- Atlantic tarpon
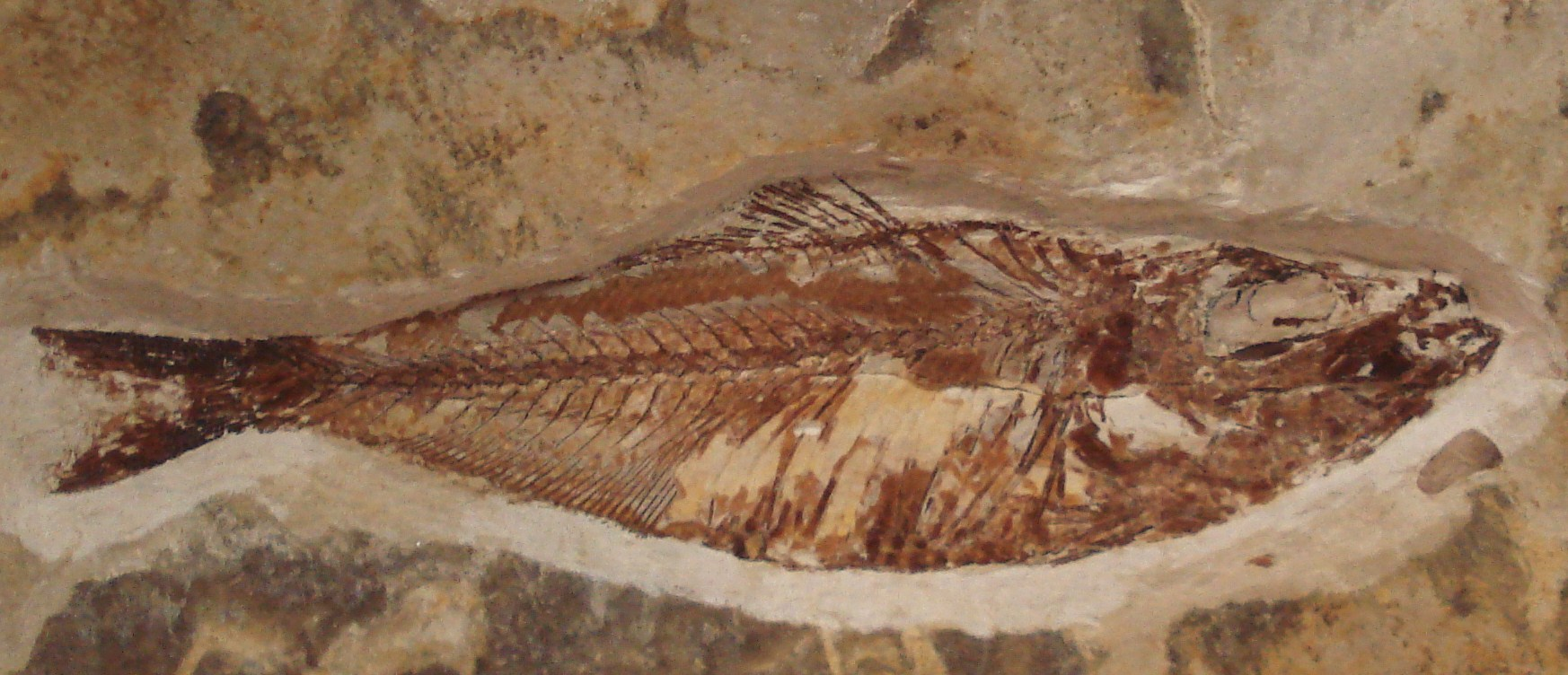
- Fossil specimen of Sedenhorstia

Scientific classification
- Kingdom: Animalia
- Phylum: Chordata
- Class: Actinopterygii
- Order: Elopiformes
- Family: Megalopidae; D. S. Jordan, 1923

= Megalopidae =

Megalopidae Temporal range: Early Cretaceous–present

Family of fishes

Megalopidae is an ancient family of ray-finned fish, one of two living members of the order Elopiformes. It contains a single living genus (Megalops, the tarpons) with two species, and several extinct genera dating back to the Early Cretaceous. They likely diverged from their closest relatives, the Elopidae, during the Late Jurassic.

== Taxonomy ==
The following genera belong to this family:

- Genus Megalops Lacépède, 1803 (=†Starrias Jordan, 1925) - Late Cretaceous (Campanian) or Late Oligocene to present
- Genus †Arratiaelops Taverne, 1999 - Early Cretaceous (Valanginian) of Belgium & England
- Genus †Brouweria de Beaufort, 1926 - Early Miocene of Sulawesi, Indonesia
- Genus †Elopoides Wenz, 1965 - Early Cretaceous (Albian) of France
- Genus †Ikawaihere Gottfried et al., 2026 - Paleogene of the Chatham Islands, New Zealand
- Genus †Paratarpon Bardack, 1970 - Late Cretaceous (Campanian) of Alberta, Canada
- Genus †Promegalops Casier, 1966 - Early Eocene of England
- Genus †Protarpon Forey, 1973 - Late Paleocene to Early Eocene of Morocco & England
- Genus †Sedenhorstia White & Moy-Thomas, 1941 - Late Cretaceous (Cenomanian to Campanian) of Lebanon and Germany
