= Daitingichthys =

Daitingichthys Temporal range: Early Tithonian

Scientific classification
- Kingdom: Animalia
- Phylum: Chordata
- Class: Actinopterygii
- Order: Elopiformes
- Genus: †Daitingichthys; Arratia, 1987
- Species: †D. tischlingeri

Binomial name
- †Daitingichthys tischlingeri Arratia, 1987

Extinct genus of fishes

Daitingichthys ("Daiting fish") is an extinct genus of prehistoric marine ray-finned fish that lived during the Late Jurassic period. It contains a single species, D. tischlingeri from the early Tithonian-aged Mörnsheim Formation of the Solnhofen Limestone, Germany. It is thought to be a stem-elopiform, related to modern ladyfish and tarpons.
