= Coryphaenopsis =

Coryphaenopsis Temporal range: Turonian

Scientific classification
- Domain: Eukaryota
- Kingdom: Animalia
- Phylum: Chordata
- Class: Actinopterygii
- Order: Elopiformes
- Genus: †Coryphaenopsis; Frič & Bayer, 1902
- Species: †C. brevis

Binomial name
- †Coryphaenopsis brevis Frič & Bayer, 1902

Extinct genus of fishes

Coryphaenopsis is an extinct genus of prehistoric marine ray-finned fish that lived during the Late Cretaceous. It contains a single species, C. brevis, known from the Turonian of the Czech Republic. It was an elopiform related to modern tarpons and ladyfish.

== See also ==
- Prehistoric fish
- List of prehistoric bony fish
