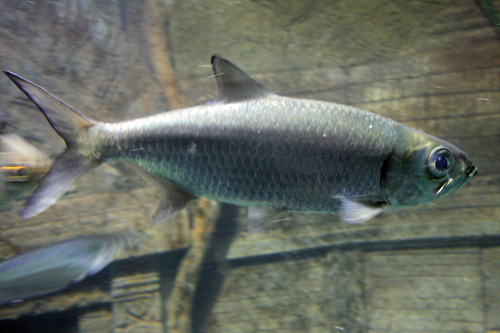

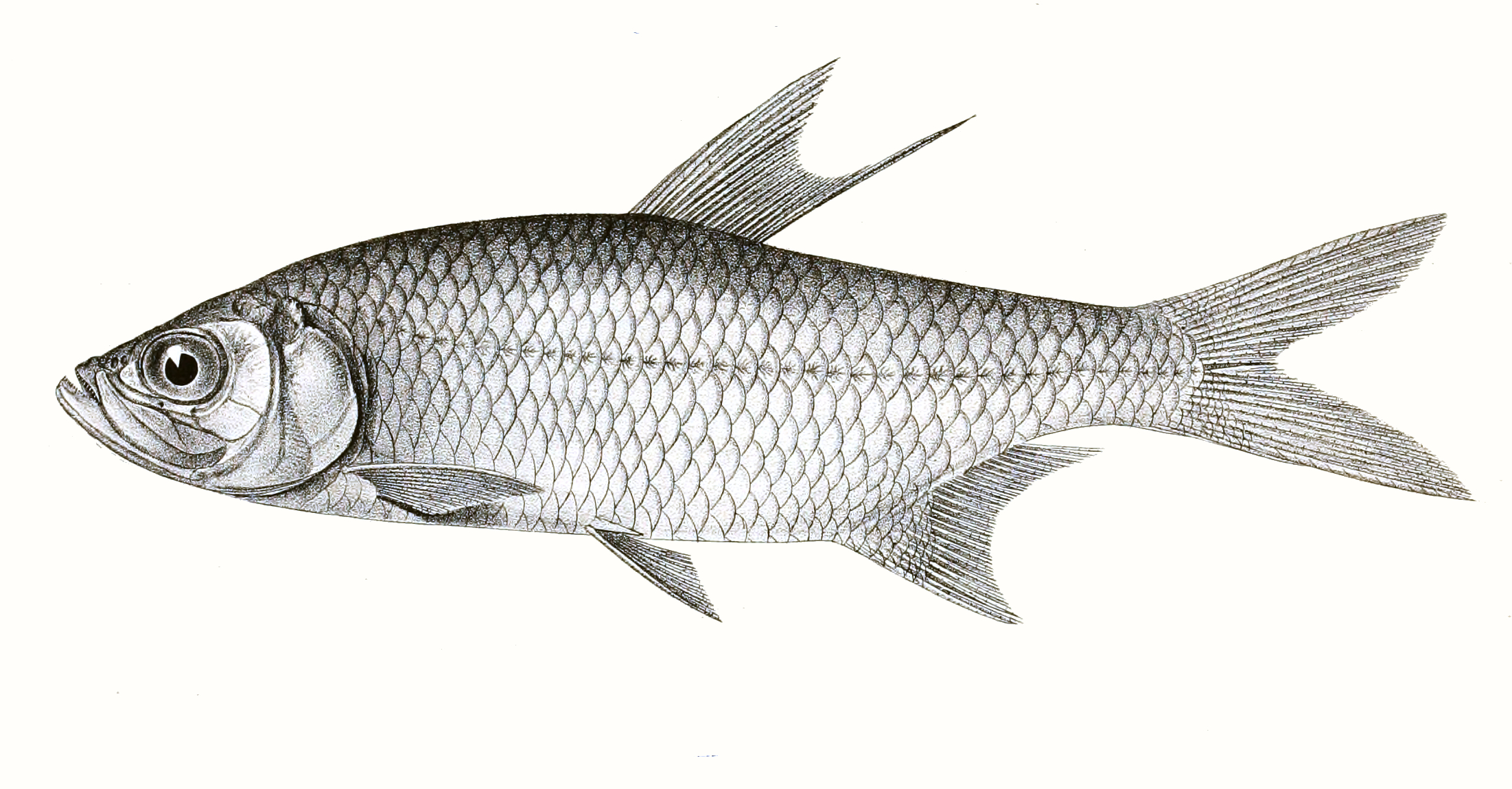

Conservation status
- Data Deficient (IUCN 3.1)

Scientific classification
- Kingdom: Animalia
- Phylum: Chordata
- Class: Actinopterygii
- Order: Elopiformes
- Family: Megalopidae
- Genus: Megalops
- Species: M. cyprinoides

Binomial name
- Megalops cyprinoides (Broussonet, 1782)

Synonyms
- Clupea cyprinoides Broussonet 1782; Elops cyprinoides (Broussonet 1782); Clupea thrissoides Bloch & Schneider 1801; Cyprinodon cundingus Hamilton 1822; Elops cundingus (Hamilton 1822); Megalops cundingus (Hamilton 1822); Megalops curtifilis Richardson 1846; Megalops filamentosus Lacepède 1803; Megalops indicus Valenciennes 1847; Megalops macrophthalmus Bleeker 1851; Megalops macropterus Bleeker 1866; Megalops oligolepis Bleeker 1866; Megalops setipinnis Richardson 1846; Megalops staigeri Castelnau 1878

= Indo-Pacific tarpon =

Indo-Pacific tarpon Temporal range: Holocene

Species of fish

The Indo-Pacific tarpon (Megalops cyprinoides), also known as the oxeye herring or simply herring due to its superficial resemblance to the true herrings, of which it is not a member, is the smaller of the two species of tarpon and lives in Indo-Pacific waters.

== Description ==
In appearance, it is like the much larger Atlantic tarpon, M. atlanticus - olive-green on top, and silver on the sides. The large mouth is turned upwards; the lower jaw contains an elongated, bony plate. The last ray of the dorsal fin is much longer than the others, reaching nearly to the tail. It is capable of filling its swim bladder with air and absorbing oxygen from it. Those living in fresh water tend to be smaller than the ones living in saltwater, growing just over 50 cm (20 in), while saltwater examples grow over 1 m (3.3 ft). They live upwards of 44 years and mature within two. They complete their metamorphosis from their larval stage in 10 days.

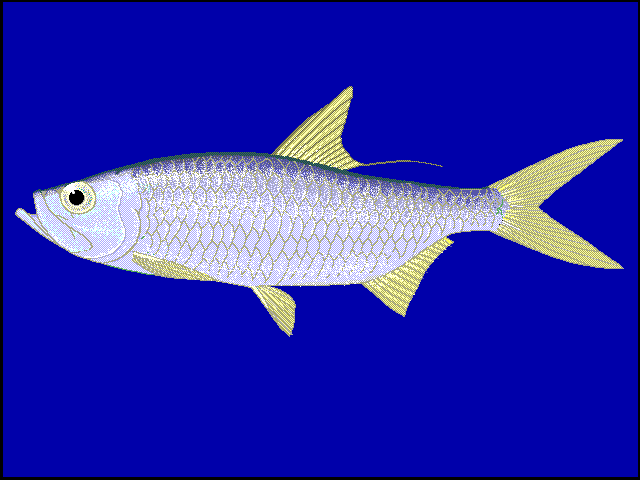

== Diet and behavior ==
They are opportunistic, feeding on smaller fish, crustaceans, and even plants rarely. In salt water, they mainly feed on prawns and herring, but also many other small fish. In fresh water, no significant difference in their food habits is seen; they eat freshwater prawns and bony bream, mainly.

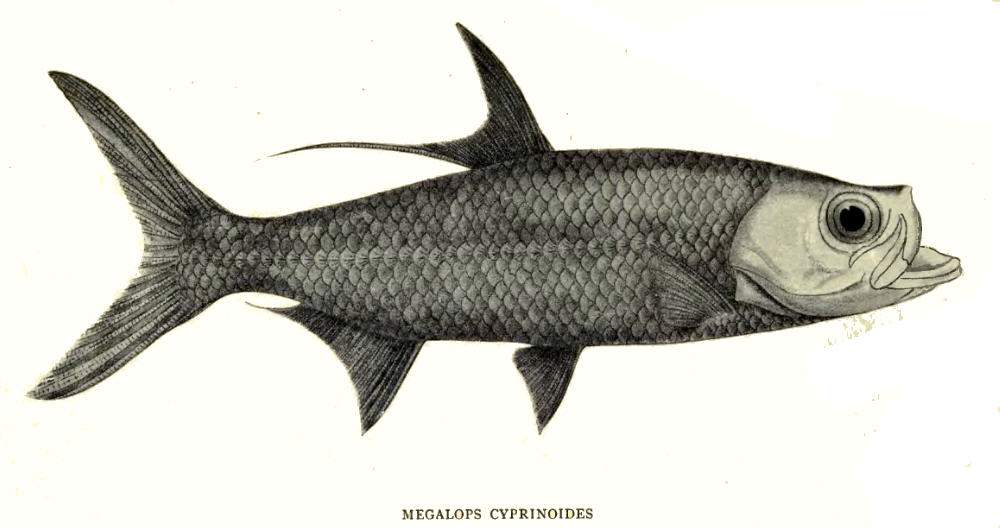

The Indo-Pacific tarpon migrates between the open sea and inland rivers. As with all Elopiformes, it spawns mainly offshore. Juveniles of the species stay inshore and migrate to coastal areas while maturing to spawn. Typically, they spawn twice a year. At sea, the larvae migrate inland and are leptocephalic (flattened, transparent and eel-like). Unlike the barramundi, they are able to breed in fresh and salt water.

They are found at depths to 50 m (160 ft), but are commonly found by the surface in shallow, inshore waters. They inhabit coral reefs, mangroves, swamps, rivers, lakes, reservoirs, floodplains, and canals. In Papua New Guinea, they are reportedly found under large mats of Salvinia molesta.

== Distribution ==
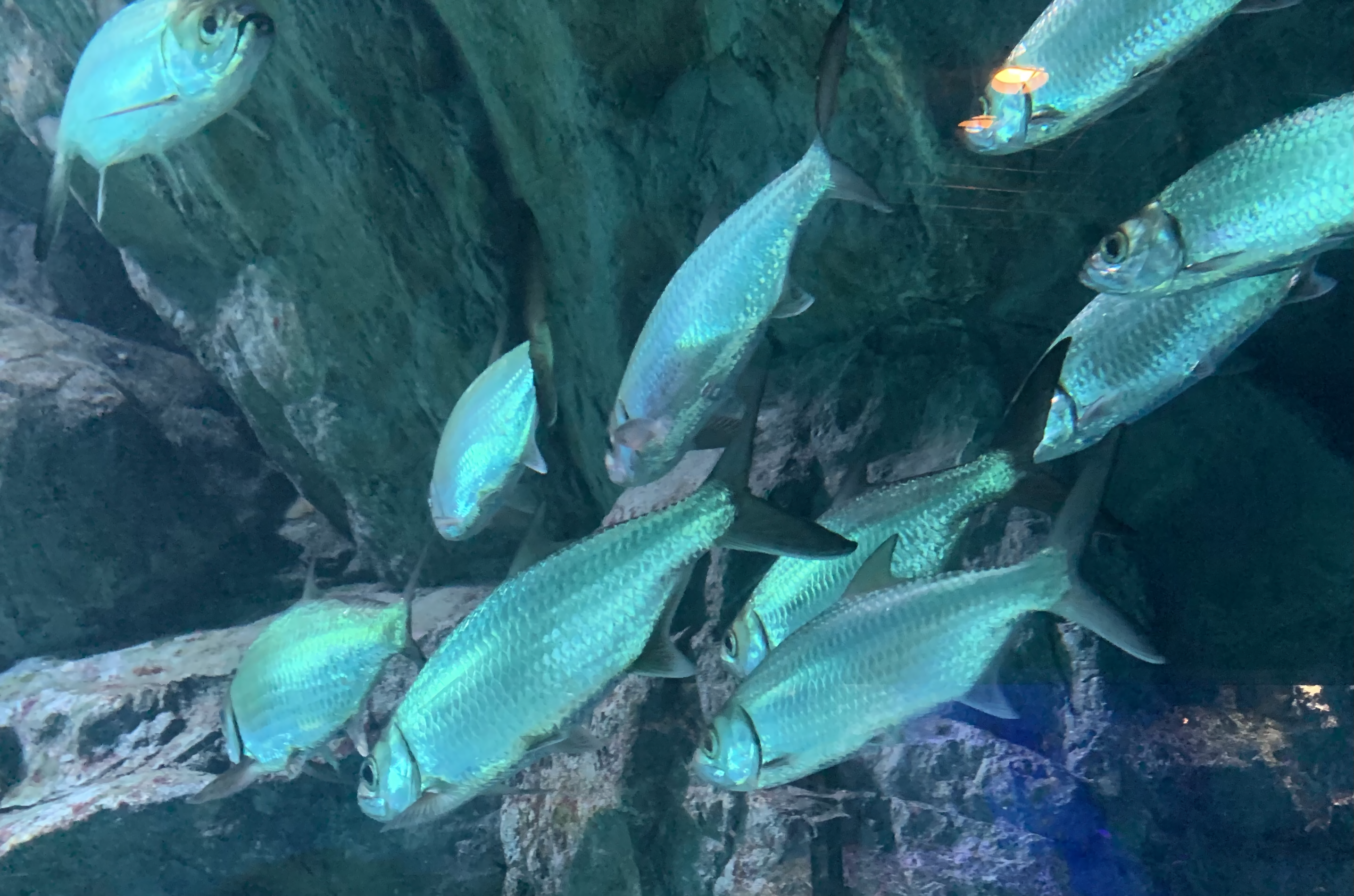
Swim in a flock

The Indo-Pacific tarpon is found from the coasts of East Africa and the Arabian Peninsula to the coastal waters of South Asia, Southeast Asia, southern Japan, French Polynesia, and southern Australia. Their usual habitat is in coastal waters, estuaries and many miles upstream (from the estuaries) in freshwater rivers and lakes. They are amphidromus, i.e. they migrate from the river to the sea, and from the sea to the river. The tarpon lives in many tropical areas of Australia in the tropical, coastal, and brackish waters of the Indo-Pacific Ocean in both fresh and salt water. They are widely distributed from Australia, Japan, South and Southeast Asia and North Africa. Data are deficient on their population, as their commercial landings and human disturbances are unknown, but they are known to be extremely common throughout their range. Over 300 specimens are found in museums.

== Local names ==
In Bengal, South Asia, they are known as koral fish (নানচিল কোরাল). In Indonesia, they were called ikan bulan (moon fish). In Vietnam it is called the cá cháo lớn, "large congee fish". In Odisha, India, the local name is Pani akhia .
