= Elops smithi =

Conservation status
- Data Deficient (IUCN 3.1)

Scientific classification
- Kingdom: Animalia
- Phylum: Chordata
- Class: Actinopterygii
- Order: Elopiformes
- Family: Elopidae
- Genus: Elops
- Species: E. smithi

Binomial name
- Elops smithi McBride, C. R. Rocha, Ruiz-Carus & Bowen, 2010

Species of ray-finned fish

The malacho or Southern ladyfish, (Elops smithi) is a species of ray-finned fish in the genus Elops, the only genus in the monotypic family Elopidae.

== Description ==
Elops smithi like other species in its genus, has a long, slender, round body covered with silvery scales. The mouth is terminal and the tail is deeply forked. Identification of all seven Elops species requires counting the number of gillrakers and vertebrae.

== Distribution ==
Elops smithi is distributed in the western South Atlantic Ocean from as far south as Rio de Janeiro, Brazil, to the Caribbean Sea, Bahamas, and the southwestern Gulf of Mexico.

Leptocephali and juveniles are also collected along the eastern seaboard of North America, the northern and eastern Gulf of Mexico, and Bermuda, but these represent waifs or vagrants, and do not support a population of adults.

Its distribution overlaps with the ladyfish (Elops saurus) in the southeast US and the southern Gulf of Mexico.

== Biology ==
Like other members of Elopidae, E. smithi is a pelagic fish that spawns in the sea, but little is known about this marine phase. The larvae, which are transparent and laterally compressed, are dispersed inshore and enter embayments, where they reside for two to three years before moving offshore. The juveniles are euryhaline, or tolerant to a wide range of salinity, so these embayments may be low-salinity estuaries or hypersaline lagoons. Subadults move into the lower reaches of the embayments, eventually leaving in association with maturation for offshore, marine habitats. Diets in the Caribbean region are dominated by engraulidid fish and penaeid shrimp.

== Fishery ==
Malacho were used as bait in commercial fisheries in Cuba. In the southeast U.S., the malacho is a small (< 1-2%) but unrecognized component of the commercial and recreational catch. Recreational landings occurring in Puerto Rico should be attributed to Elops smithi where this species is considered a popular sportfish. This species is likely caught in subsistence fisheries elsewhere in its range.

== Threats ==
Elops species use estuarine areas and hypersaline lagoons; changes in the quality of these habitats may affect this genus' population dynamics. Although not closely associated with any single habitat, it may be adversely affected by development and urbanization.
