= Ikawaihere =

Ikawaihere Temporal range: Late Paleocene or Early Eocene

Scientific classification
- Kingdom: Animalia
- Phylum: Chordata
- Class: Actinopterygii
- Order: Elopiformes
- Family: Megalopidae
- Genus: †Ikawaihere
- Species: †I. koehleri

Binomial name
- †Ikawaihere koehleri Gottfried et al., 2026

Extinct genus of megalopid ray-finned fish

Ikawaihere is an extinct genus of megalopid ray-finned fish, related to modern tarpon, that lived in Zealandia during the Dannevirke epoch of the Palaeogene period. It contains a single species, I. koehleri from the Late Paleocene or Early Eocene-aged Red Bluff Tuff Formation of Pitt Island in the Chatham Islands. The genus name comes from ika, the Moriori word for fish, and Waihere Bay, the type locality of the specimen. The specific epithet honors its discoverer, Dr. Richard Koehler of the University of Otago.

== Discovery ==
The type specimen represents a three-dimensionally preserved, nearly complete individual about 1.2 metres (3.9 ft) in length. It was discovered in 1999 eroding out of a cliff 40 metres (130 ft) above sea level by Richard Koehler, and excavation required a tall ladder to be carried across several kilometers of rough terrain to the cliff face. Efforts to describe the fish stalled after the passing of Koehler, which left its locality information uncertain, until Koehler's field notebooks were donated to the University of Otago by his family members.

Although invertebrate fossils from the Red Bluff Tuff Formation have been known since the 1840s, Ikawaihere is the first vertebrate fossil to be described from the formation. The exceptional preservation of the specimen suggests an extremely rapid burial by volcanic tuff.

== Description ==
Ikawaihere koehleri, the type species, is distinguished from other megalopids in possessing an elongate body, a relatively low-profile head, a high and strongly developed coronoid process of the mandible, an enlarged median gular, an extra series of anamestic bones in the cheek region, and the continuation of the lateral line scales as a tapering lobe that extend onto the base of the caudal fin.
