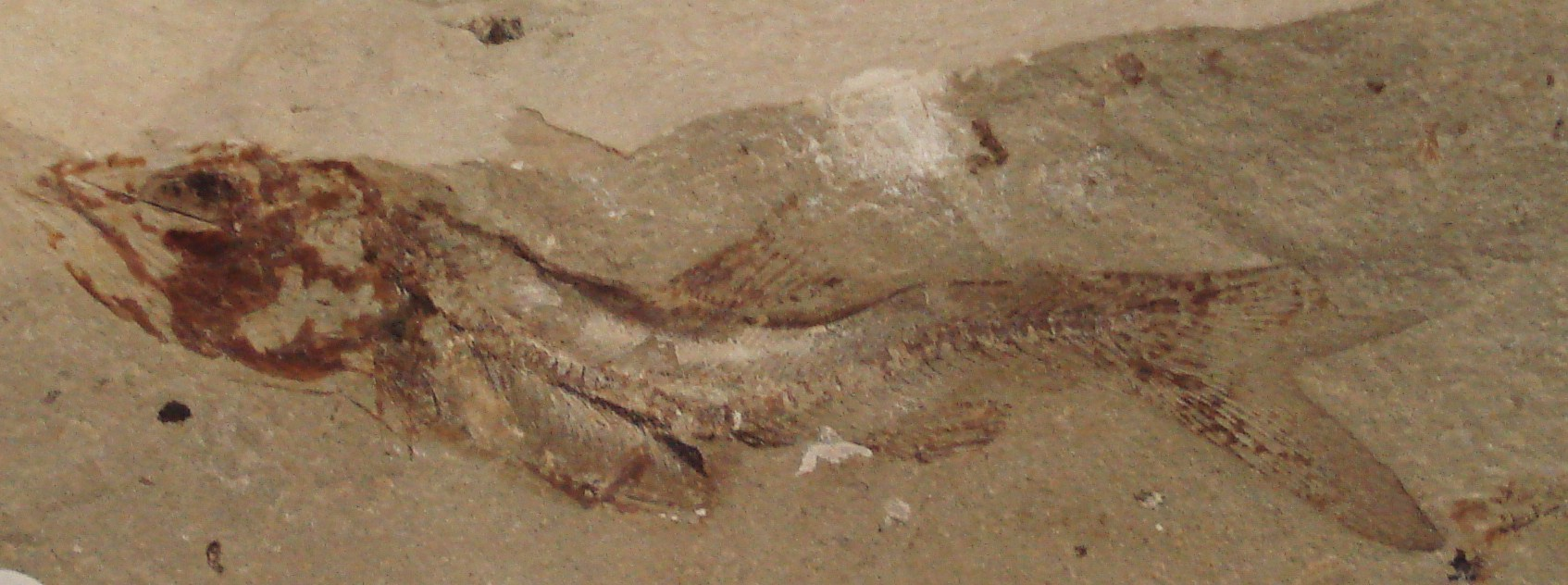
- Specimen of D. gardneri

Scientific classification
- Kingdom: Animalia
- Phylum: Chordata
- Class: Actinopterygii
- Order: Elopiformes
- Family: Elopidae
- Genus: †Davichthys; Forey, 1973

Type species
- †Osmeroides dubius Davis, 1887

Species
- †D. dubius (Davis, 1887); †D. gardneri Forey, 1973; †D. lacostei (Arambourg, 1954)

= Davichthys =

Davichthys Temporal range: Cenomanian to Santonian

Extinct genus of fishes

Davichthys is an extinct genus of prehistoric marine ray-finned fish related to modern ladyfish. It is known from the Late Cretaceous of southern Europe, the Middle East, and North Africa. It is one of the earliest known elopids.

== Taxonomy ==
The following species are known:

- †D. dubius (Davis, 1887) - Late Santonian of Lebanon (Sahel Alma) (=Osmeroides dubius Davis, 1887)
- †D. gardneri Forey, 1973 - Late Cenomanian of Lebanon (Sannine Formation)
- †D. lacostei (Arambourg, 1954) - Late Cenomanian of Italy (Scaglia Variegata Alpina Formation, Scaglia Bianca Formation) including Sicily (Argille Varicolori Formation), and Morocco (Jbel Tselfat) (=Holcolepis lacostei Arambourg, 1954)

== Description ==
This fish was usually less than 15 centimeters long, and its appearance must have been very similar to that of the modern Elops . Like the latter, Davichthys had an elongated body with an oval cross-section, slightly flattened laterally. The eyes were rather large, while the mouth had robust jaws. The dorsal fin and the anal fin were rather small; the ventral fins were inserted far back, under the dorsal. The pectoral fins were placed low on the body. The caudal fin was very broad and strongly forked.

== See also ==
- Prehistoric fish
- List of prehistoric bony fish
