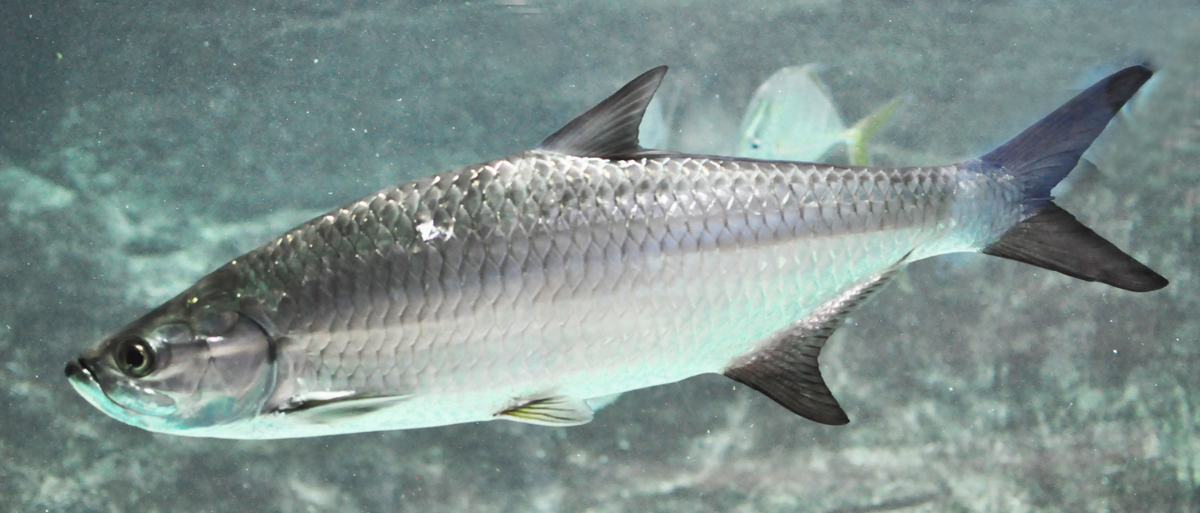

Conservation status
- Vulnerable (IUCN 3.1)

Scientific classification
- Kingdom: Animalia
- Phylum: Chordata
- Class: Actinopterygii
- Division: Teleostei
- Order: Elopiformes
- Family: Megalopidae
- Genus: Megalops
- Species: M. atlanticus

Binomial name
- Megalops atlanticus Valenciennes, 1847

Synonyms
- Tarpon atlanticus (Valenciennes 1847); Clupea gigantea Shaw 1804; Megalops giganteus (Shaw 1804); Megalops elongatus Girard 1859; Amia subargentea Browne 1789

= Atlantic tarpon =

Atlantic tarpon Temporal range: Miocene-recent,

Species of fish

The Atlantic tarpon (Megalops atlanticus) is a ray-finned fish that inhabits coastal waters, estuaries, lagoons, and rivers. It is also known as the silver king. It is found in the Atlantic Ocean, typically in tropical and subtropical regions, though it has been reported as far north as Nova Scotia and the Atlantic coast of southern France, and as far south as Argentina. As with all elopiformes, it spawns at sea. Its diet includes small fish and crustaceans.

The tarpon has a reputation for great aerobatics, attaining astonishing size, and having impressive armored scales. It is generally considered to be of poor food quality, but it is highly valued as a game fish by recreational fishermen.

== Description ==
Atlantic tarpon evolved approximately 18 million years ago and are one of the oldest living fish.

It has been recorded at up to 2.5 m (8 ft 2 in) in length and weighing up to 161 kg (355 lb). Males rarely weigh more than 100 pounds.

A tarpon is capable of filling its swim bladder with air, like a primitive lung. This gives it a predatory advantage when oxygen levels in the water are low. In appearance, it is greenish or bluish on top and silver on the sides. The large mouth is turned upwards and the lower jaw contains an elongated, bony plate. The last ray of the dorsal fin is much longer than the others, reaching nearly to the tail.

== Behavior ==
The Atlantic tarpon's most significant predators are sharks and humans.

The diet of the Atlantic tarpon changes as the fish grows with those in the leptocephalus stage absorbing nutrients directly from the water, those in the juvenile stage eating zooplankton and other small prey, and adults primarily consuming fish, crabs, and shrimp.

== Relationship with humans ==
The scales of Atlantic tarpon have been used as nail files and for decorative purposes since pre-history. Their crushed up scales also feature in traditional medicine, particularly in Brazil.

An Atlantic tarpon is depicted in the fresco on the ceiling of the Sistine Chapel completed by Michelangelo around 1510.

The Atlantic tarpon was first described scientifically by zoologist Achille Valenciennes in 1847 as Megalops atlanticus, Megalops being inspired by their large eyes.

The tarpon is the official state saltwater fish of the American state of Alabama.

Atlantic tarpon adapt well to urban and suburban environments due to their tolerance for boat traffic and low water quality. Around humans Atlantic tarpon are primarily nocturnal.

While the Atlantic tarpon is rarely consumed in the United States, subsistence and commercial fisheries exist in a number of countries. Both their meat and roe are consumed.

=== Game fishing ===
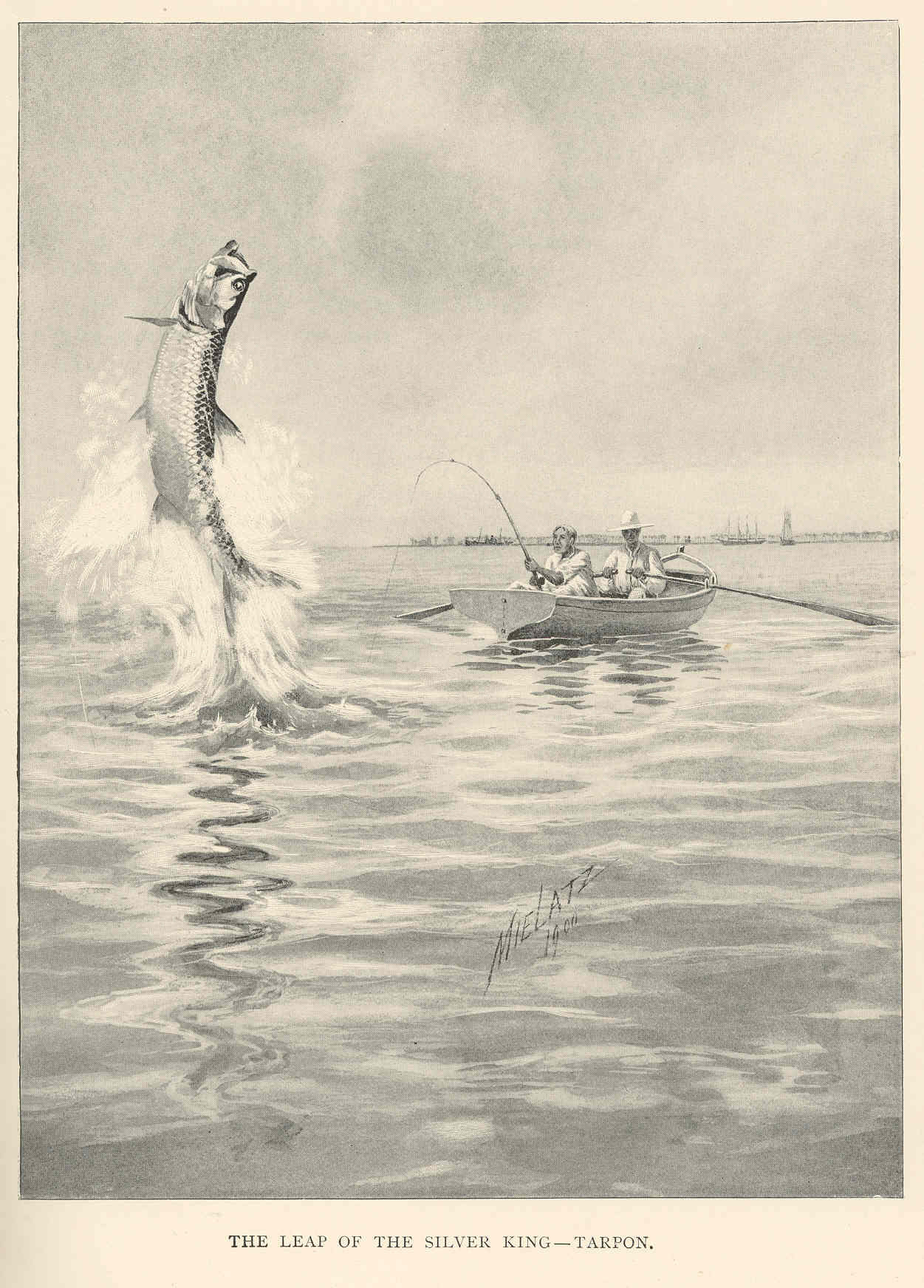
The Leap of the Silver King -- Tarpon (depicts early sport fishing for Atlantic tarpon)

Tarpons are considered one of the great saltwater game fishes, not only because of their size and their accessible haunts, but also because of their fighting spirit when hooked; they are very strong, making spectacular leaps into the air. They are the largest species targeted by fly fishermen in shallow water. The flesh is undesirable, commonly described as being smelly and bony. In Florida and Alabama, a special permit is required to kill and keep a tarpon, so most tarpon fishing there is catch and release. In Texas they are a revered game fish with only potential state records (fish over 75 inches) allowed to be kept. Atlantic tarpon are a mainstay of Florida's fishing guides with many of them specializing in fly fishing for them. Tarpon in Florida were historically taken with harpoons but hook and line fishing for them by out of state anglers began in 1885 or so.

Tarpon are also known by English speaking anglers as "The Silver King."

== Geographical distribution and migration ==
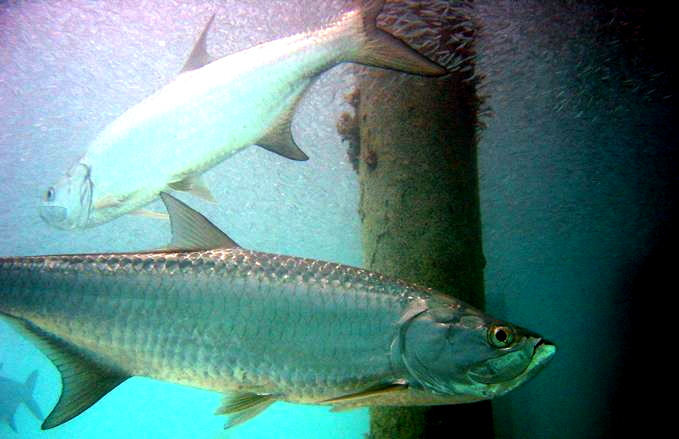
Atlantic tarpon

Since tarpons are not commercially valuable as a food fish, very little has been documented concerning their geographical distribution and migrations. They inhabit both sides of the Atlantic Ocean. Their range in the eastern Atlantic has been reliably established from Senegal to the Congo. Tarpons inhabiting the western Atlantic are principally found to populate warmer coastal waters primarily in the Gulf of Mexico, Florida, and the West Indies. Nonetheless, they are regularly caught by anglers at Cape Hatteras and as far as Nova Scotia, Bermuda, and south to Argentina. In the Gulf of Mexico there are two distinct populations divided by the Mississippi River Delta.

Atlantic tarpon are highly migratory and often cross international boundaries. This introduces challenges in management and conservation.

Scientific studies indicate schools have routinely migrated through the Panama Canal from the Atlantic to the Pacific and back for over 80 years. Since tarpons tolerate a wide range of salinity and are opportunistic feeders, their migrations are limited only by water temperatures. They prefer water temperatures of 22 to 28 °C (72 to 82 °F); below 16 °C (61 °F) they become inactive, and temperatures under 4 °C (39 °F) can be lethal. A large tarpon community is found in the Rio San Juan and Lake Nicaragua. In the Pacific a population has become established in Costa Rica. In 2024, it was recorded in northern Peru.

Atlantic tarpon breed in spawning aggregations in the open ocean. Atlantic tarpon share a unique larval stage known as a leptocephalus with bonefish, ladyfish, and eels. Unlike the larvae of other fish these larvae do not eat as their long slender bodies have very low energy requirements. While larvae the Atlantic tarpon's teeth grow pointed forward to keep debris out of their mouth. The leptocephali develop into juveniles which make their way inshore, often into stagnant water with a very low oxygen content which can't be tolerated by most of their predators. When they are about three years old Atlantic tarpon migrate from these backwater habitats to a variety of nearshore ones, growing rapidly but primarily in length as opposed to girth. At around eight years of age an Atlantic tarpon reaches its sexual maturity and begins to gain girth as well as length. Growth rates also diverge at this point with males growing much slower than females. Sexually mature Atlantic tarpon will begin migrating to join spawning aggregations.

== Gallery ==
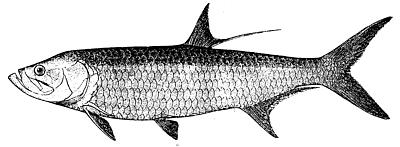
Illustration of an Atlantic Tarpon

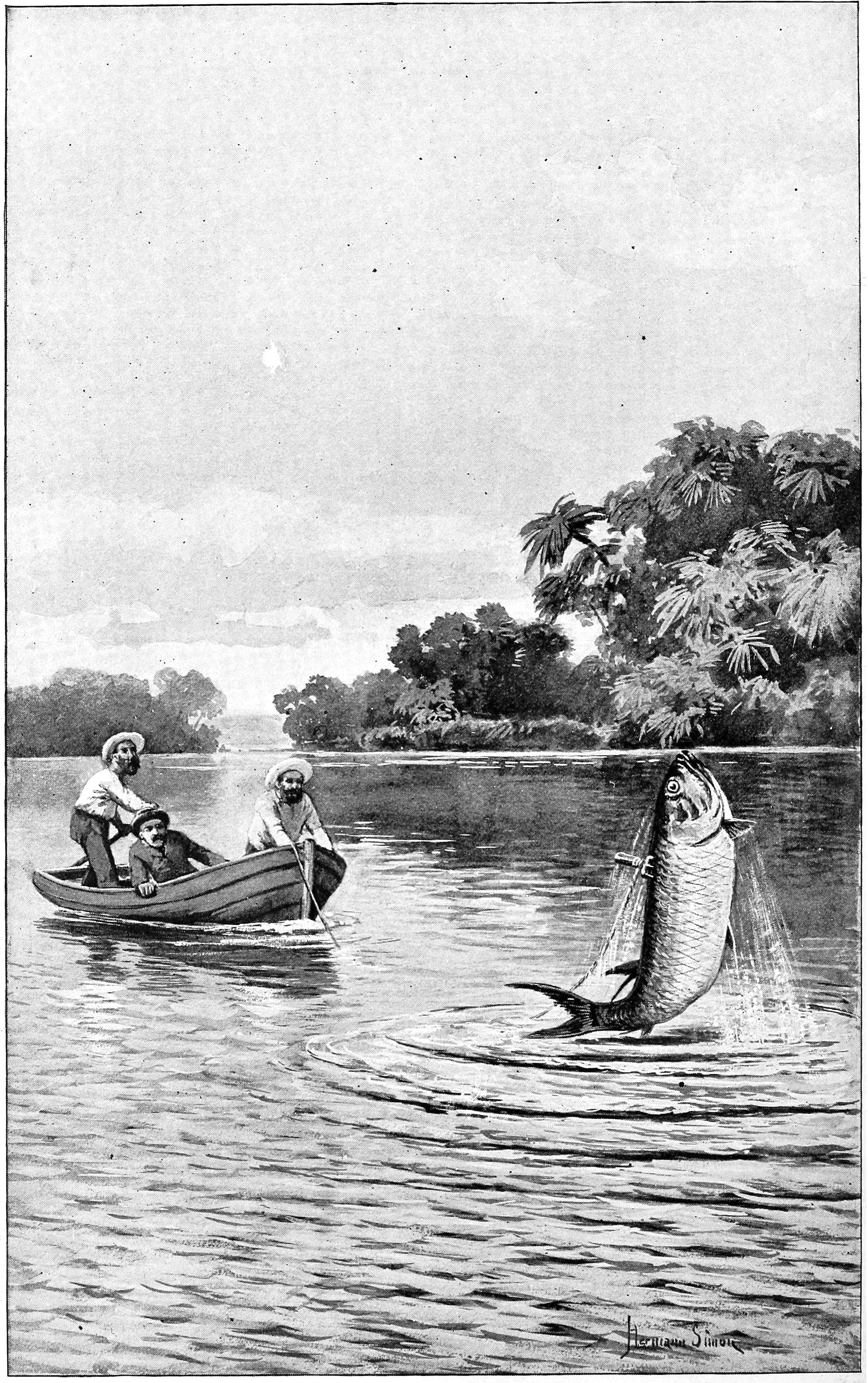
The Leap of the Silver King, by Hermann Simon

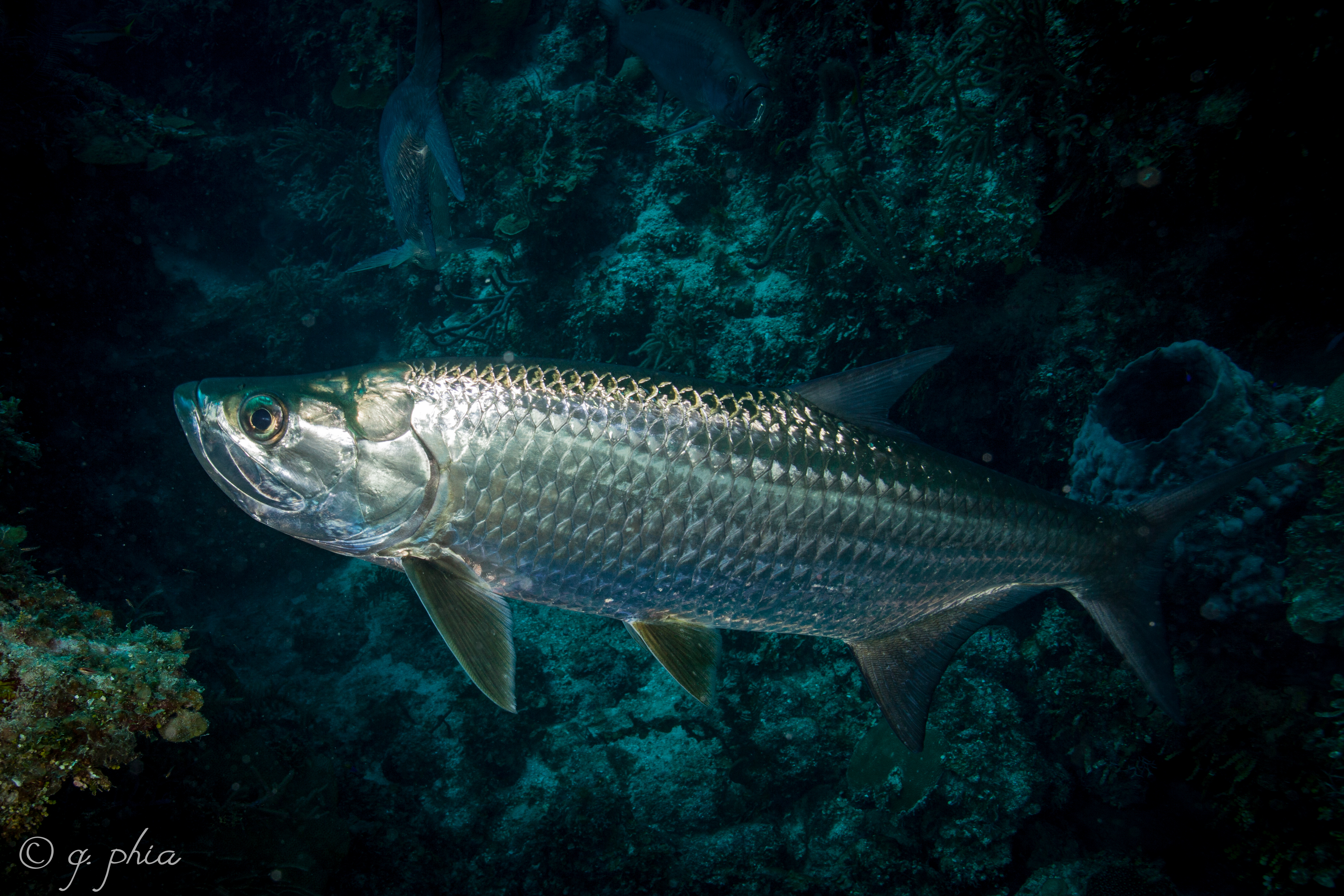
2017, Cuba

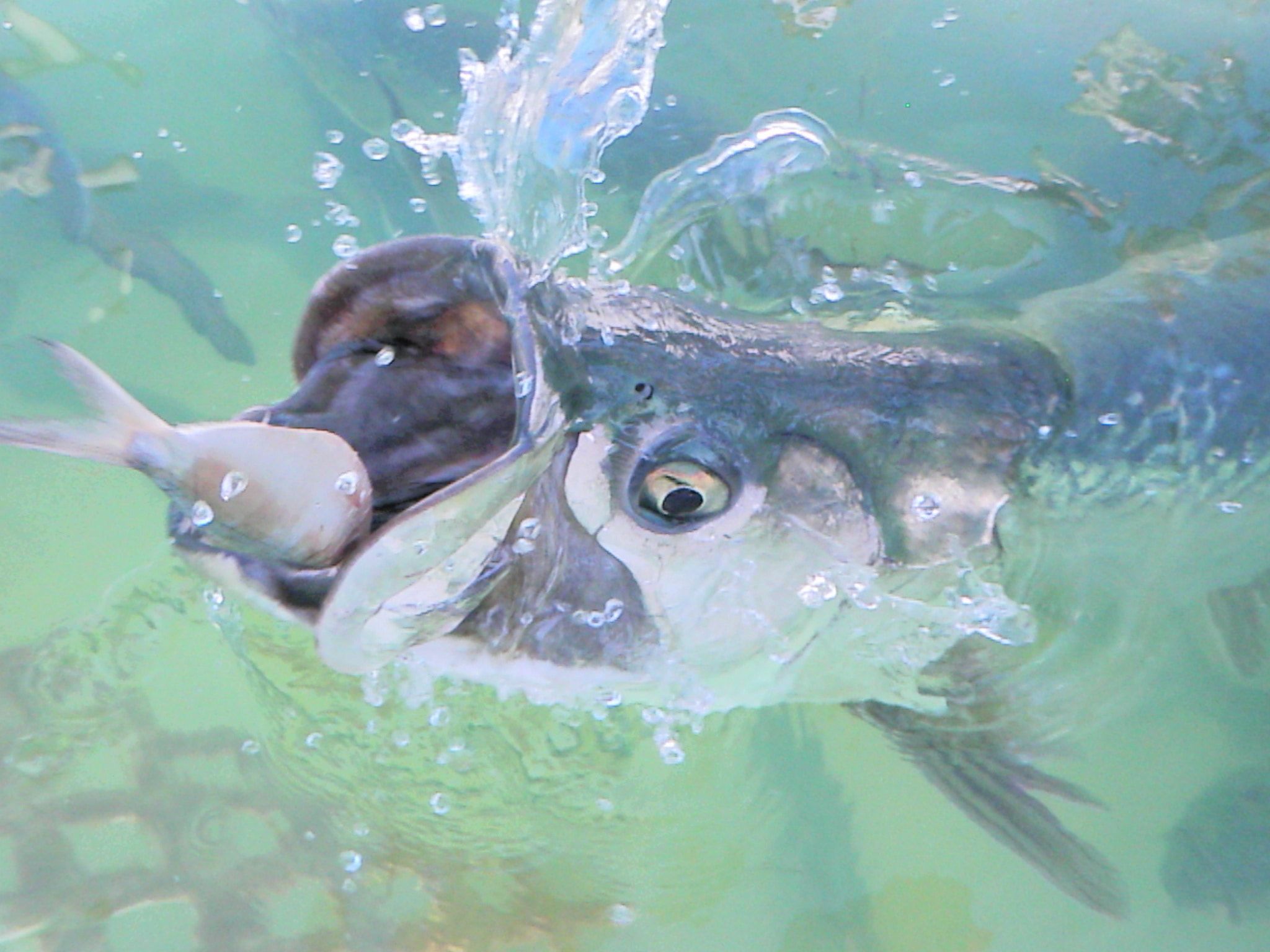
Atlantic tarpon eating

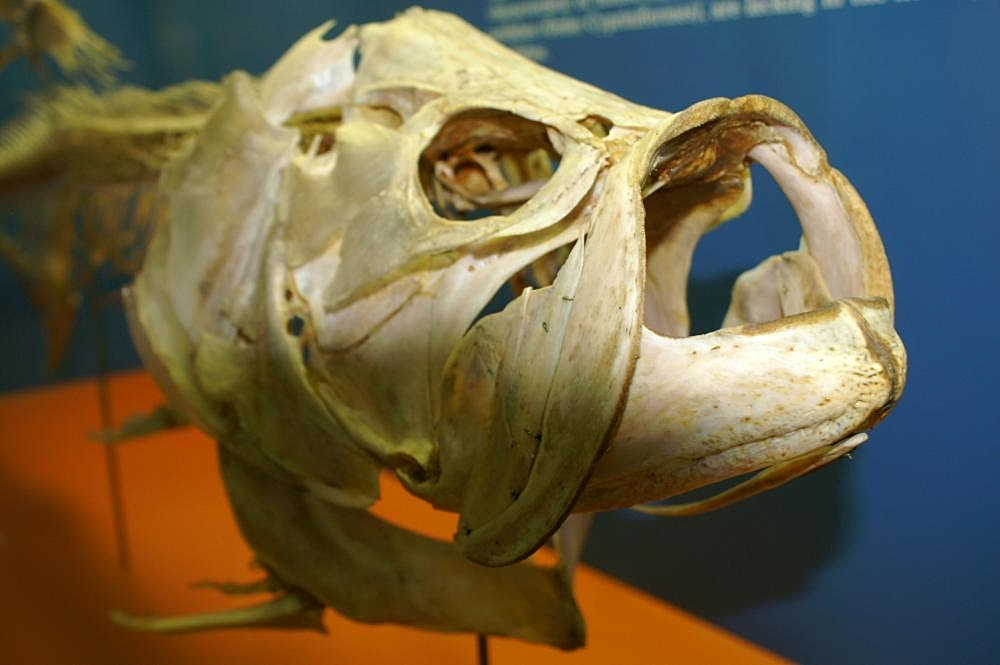
Megalops atlanticus skull

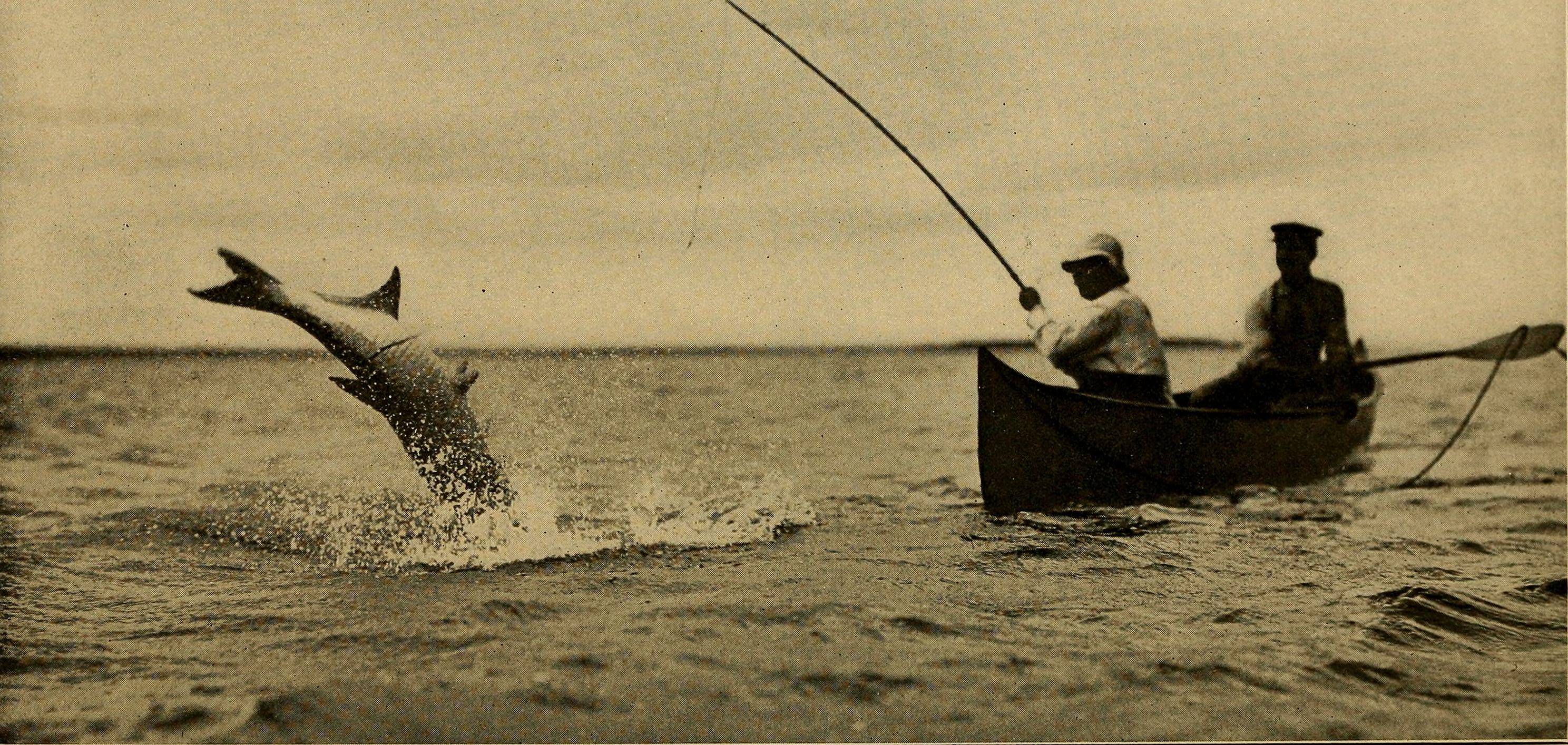
Atlantic tarpon fishing with a fishing guide from a canoe in Florida in 1885

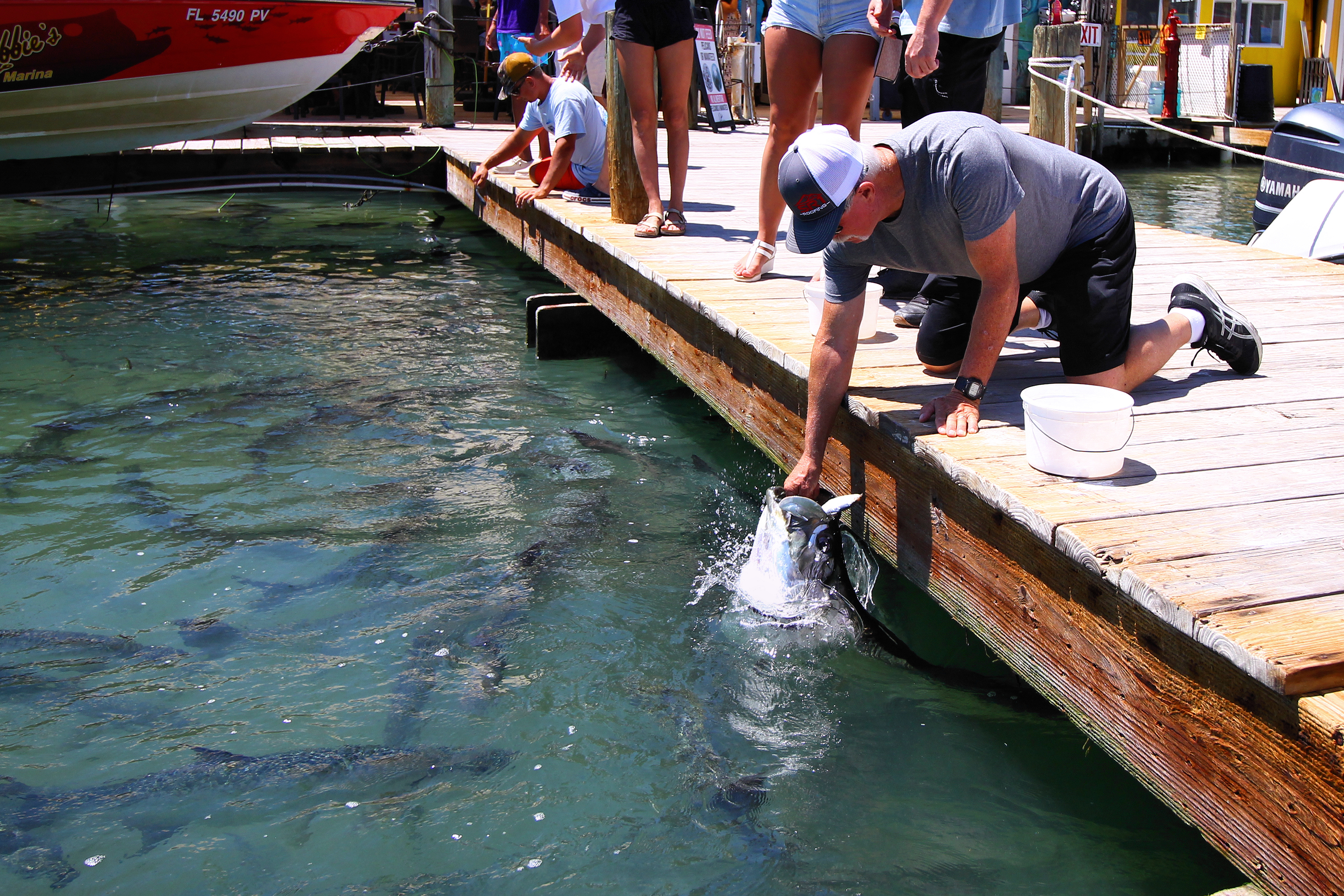
Tourists hand feeding Atlantic tarpon in Islamorada, Florida

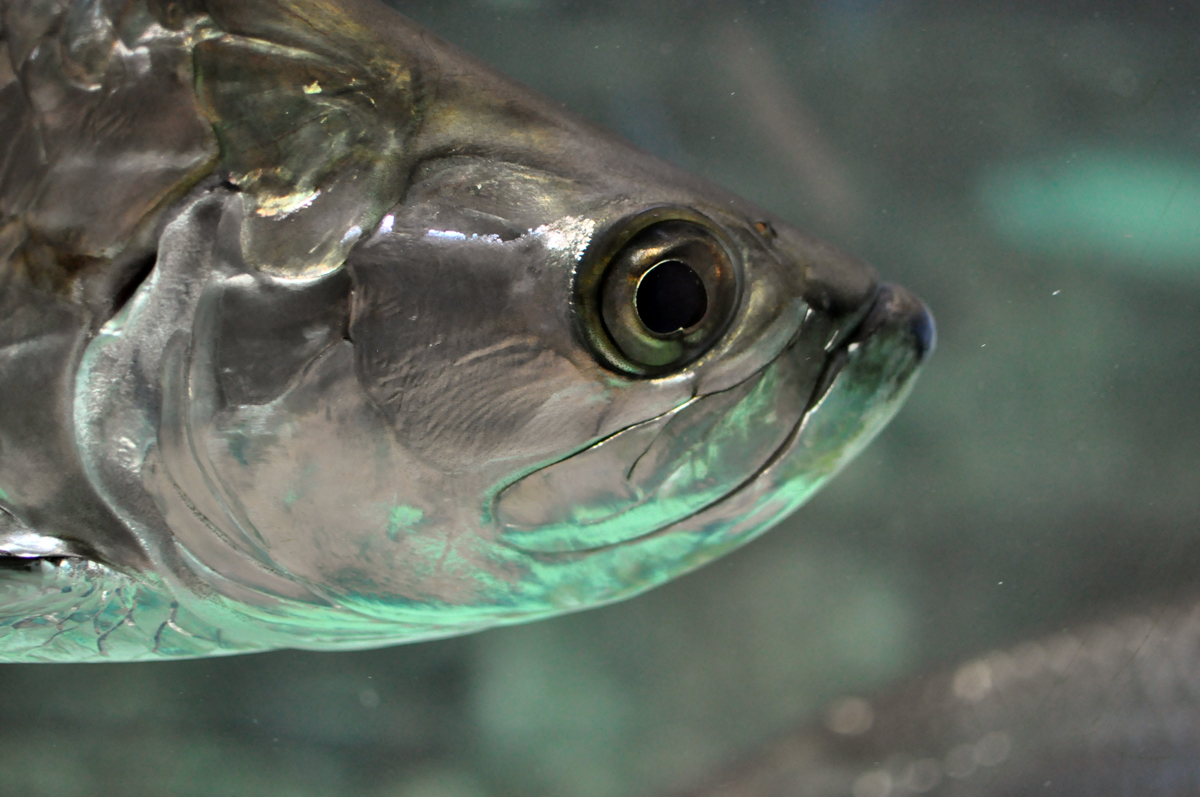
closeup of face

== See also ==
- Flats fishing
- Indo-Pacific tarpon
- Milkfish
