= Hendrik Albertus Brouwer =

Dutch geologist

Hendrik Albertus Brouwer (20 September 1886 – 18 September 1973) was a Dutch geologist who specialized in petrology and explored South Africa and the Dutch colonies in Indonesia.

Brouwer was born in Medemblik, the son of Egbertus L. Brouwer and Hendrika Poutsma. After schooling in Haarlem he went to the Technical University in Delft to study mine engineering and obtained a diploma in 1908. He received a doctoral degree for a dissertation on South African nepheline syenites in 1910. He became a professor of geology at the Delft Technical University in 1918 and during his career he travelled to Brazil, North America, South Africa and parts of southeast Asia to conduct studies on rocks. He also edited the first volume of a series on Practical Hints to Scientific Travellers in 1925. He became a professor at the University of Amsterdam in 1928, succeeding Eugène Dubois and worked there until his retirement in 1956.

An extinct genus of tarpon relative, Brouweria, is named after him due to him discovering the first known specimens. His brother was the mathematician L. E. J. Brouwer.
