= Eoprotelops =

Eoprotelops Temporal range: Kimmeridgian, 153 Ma

Scientific classification
- Domain: Eukaryota
- Kingdom: Animalia
- Phylum: Chordata
- Class: Actinopterygii
- Order: Elopiformes
- Family: †Protelopidae
- Genus: †Eoprotelops; Saint-Seine, 1949
- Species: †E. vireti

Binomial name
- †Eoprotelops vireti Saint-Seine, 1949

Extinct genus of fishes

Eoprotelops ("dawn Protelops") is an extinct genus of prehistoric marine ray-finned fish, most likely a basal elopiform, from the Late Jurassic. It contains a single species, E. vireti, from the Kimmeridgian-aged paleontological site of Cerin, France.

== See also ==
- Prehistoric fish
- List of prehistoric bony fish
