= Elopoides =

Elopoides Temporal range: Late Albian

Scientific classification
- Kingdom: Animalia
- Phylum: Chordata
- Class: Actinopterygii
- Order: Elopiformes
- Family: Megalopidae
- Genus: †Elopoides; Wenz, 1965
- Species: †E. tomassoni

Binomial name
- †Elopoides tomassoni Wenz, 1965

Extinct genus of fishes

Elopoides (meaning "similar to Elops") is an extinct genus of prehistoric marine ray-finned fish known from the Early Cretaceous of Europe. It contains a single species, E. tomassoni, known from the late Albian of Aube, France. It is thought to be a stem-group megalopid, making it closely related to modern tarpons.

It is known from a single, complete skull with a well-preserved endocast of the brain, allowing the morphology of the braincase to be compared with other, more basal ray-finned fish. Otoliths may also be preserved.

== See also ==
- Prehistoric fish
- List of prehistoric bony fish
