= Brouweria =

Brouweria Temporal range: Early Miocene
- Reconstruction of B. striata (top) and B. robusta

Scientific classification
- Kingdom: Animalia
- Phylum: Chordata
- Class: Actinopterygii
- Division: Teleostei
- Order: Elopiformes
- Family: Megalopidae
- Genus: †Brouweria de Beaufort, 1926

Type species
- †Brouweria robusta de Beaufort, 1926,

Other species
- †Brouweria striata de Beaufort, 1926

Extinct genus of fishes

Brouweria is an extinct genus of prehistoric marine ray-finned fish related to the modern tarpon. It was named by L.F. de Beaufort (1926) and assigned the family "Elopsidae", though later studies have placed it in the family Megalopidae. It was discovered by geologist Hendrik Albertus Brouwer (of which the genus honors) after rock had been exploded to construct a road, from Miocene rocks near Putanuang Asue (Maros, Sulawesi).

== Description ==
De Beaufort defines the genus by the following; the parietals are known to contact, which separates the supraoccipital from the frontals. Praefrontals are developed, the mouth is large and bordered by the praemaxillary from the in the front and the maxillary from the behind. Teeth are small, if present at all, the opercular series is complete, meta-ecto and ento-pterygoids present. Few vertebrae are known, constricting nearer to the middle with a canal to fit the spinal cord. The dorsals are of moderate length, the caudals deeply-fork and only 3 "normal vertebrae" participate through the haemal spines to support the caudals. Cycloid scales and a simple lateral line are also present.

== Classification ==
In the original description, two species were coined: B. striata and B. robusta. The former is a large individual preserving the head and anterior of the body. However, B. striata was tentatively placed into the genus despite scarce evidence for this, as expressed in the original description. Instead, it was placed in Brouweria because it can not fit anywhere else in Elopsidae.

De Beaufort also notes a B. sp., a large individual lacking a head and the anterior portion of the body. In some ways, such as grooves that generally radiate more, this individual can be distinguished from B. robusta. This specimen is about 250 millimeters long but the individual is certainly not below 400 millimeters. B. sp. is tentatively assigned the genus because "it is easier to refer a fossil, which bears a name." The specimens of B. robusta were named Specimen A and Specimen B. It may have lived similarly to other elopsids.

== See also ==
- Prehistoric fish
- List of prehistoric bony fish
