= Tarpon Bay =

Tarpon Bay or Tarpon Bayou may refer to any of several bays in Florida and South Carolina, named for the tarpon fish:

- Tarpon Bay of Sanibel Island, Florida
- Tarpon Bay of Marco Island, Florida
- Tarpon Bays of the Everglades, Florida
- Tarpon Bayou of Pinellas County, Florida
- Tarpon Bay near Myrtle Beach, South Carolina
