= Dinelops =

Dinelops Temporal range: Middle Cenomanian

Scientific classification
- Kingdom: Animalia
- Phylum: Chordata
- Class: Actinopterygii
- Division: Teleostei
- Order: Elopiformes
- Genus: †Dinelops; Woodward, 1907
- Species: †D. ornatus

Binomial name
- †Dinelops ornatus Woodward, 1907

Extinct genus of fishes

Dinelops ("terrible Elops") is an extinct genus of marine ray-finned fish from the Late Cretaceous. It contains a single species, D. ornatus, from the Cenomanian of England (English Chalk). It was initially and often continues to be classified (alongside Osmeroides) in the Osmeroididae, a family of extinct elopomorph fish that are placed in either the Albuliformes or Elopiformes. However, other studies place Osmeroides in the Albuliformes and Dinelops in the Elopiformes.

== See also ==
- Prehistoric fish
- List of prehistoric bony fish
