= Antofagastaichthys =

Antofagastaichthys Temporal range: Oxfordian

Scientific classification
- Kingdom: Animalia
- Phylum: Chordata
- Class: Actinopterygii
- Division: Teleostei
- Genus: †Antofagastaichthys; Arratia, 1986
- Species: †A. mandibularis

Binomial name
- †Antofagastaichthys mandibularis Arratia, 1986

Extinct genus of ray-finned fishes

Antofagastaichthys is an extinct genus of ray-finned fish that lived in what is now Chile during the Oxfordian stage of the Late Jurassic epoch. It contains one species, A. mandibularis, which is known from several fragmentary specimens discovered in the El Profeta Formation of Antofagasta Province.

The relationships of Antofagastaichthys to other fishes is uncertain; it has been compared to both Pachyrhizodontoidei (an extinct group of basal teleosts mostly known from the Cretaceous) and the extant order Elopiformes (which includes the modern ladyfish and tarpons).
