= Echinelops =

Echinelops Temporal range: Early Oligocene

Scientific classification
- Domain: Eukaryota
- Kingdom: Animalia
- Phylum: Chordata
- Class: Actinopterygii
- Order: Elopiformes
- Genus: †Echinelops; Murray & Hoşgör, 2012

Type species
- †Echinelops ozcani Murray & Hoşgör, 2012

Extinct genus of fishes

Echinelops is an extinct genus of elopiform ray-finned fish known from the Early Oligocene of eastern Anatolia, Turkey. It was first named by Alison M. Murray and Izzet Hoşgör in 2012 and the type species is Echinelops ozcani.
