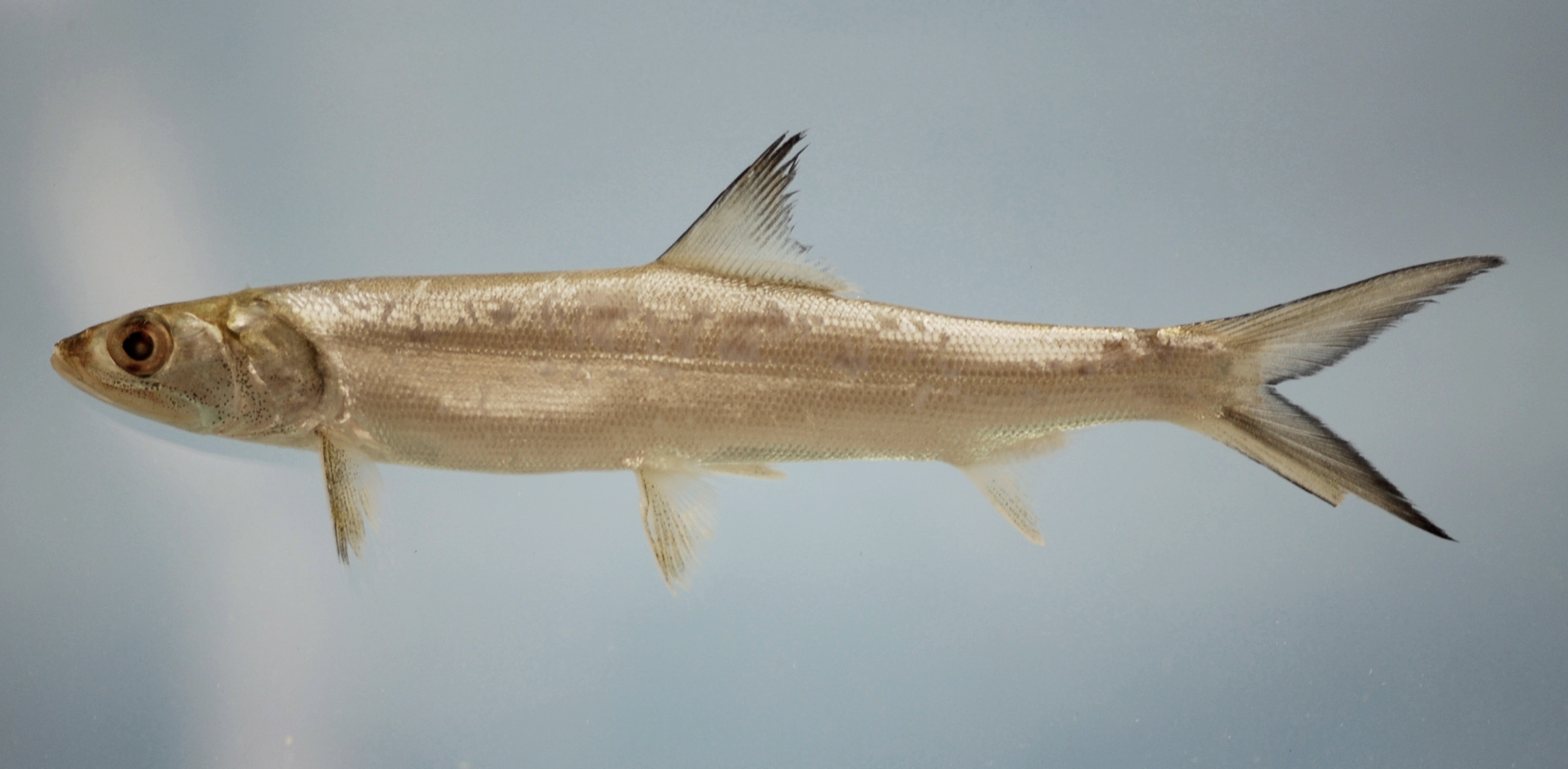

Conservation status
- Least Concern (IUCN 3.1)

Scientific classification
- Kingdom: Animalia
- Phylum: Chordata
- Class: Actinopterygii
- Division: Teleostei
- Order: Elopiformes
- Family: Elopidae
- Genus: Elops
- Species: E. saurus

Binomial name
- Elops saurus Linnaeus, 1766

Synonyms
- Ellops saurus Minding 1832; Argentina carolina Linnaeus 1766; Harengus minor bahamensis Catesby 1771; Mugilomorus annacarolinus Lacépède 1803; Trichonotus annacarolinus (Lacépède 1803); Elops inermis Mitchill 1814

= Elops saurus =

Species of fish

The ladyfish or tenpounder (Elops saurus) is a species of fish in the genus Elops, the only genus in the monotypic family Elopidae.

== Description ==
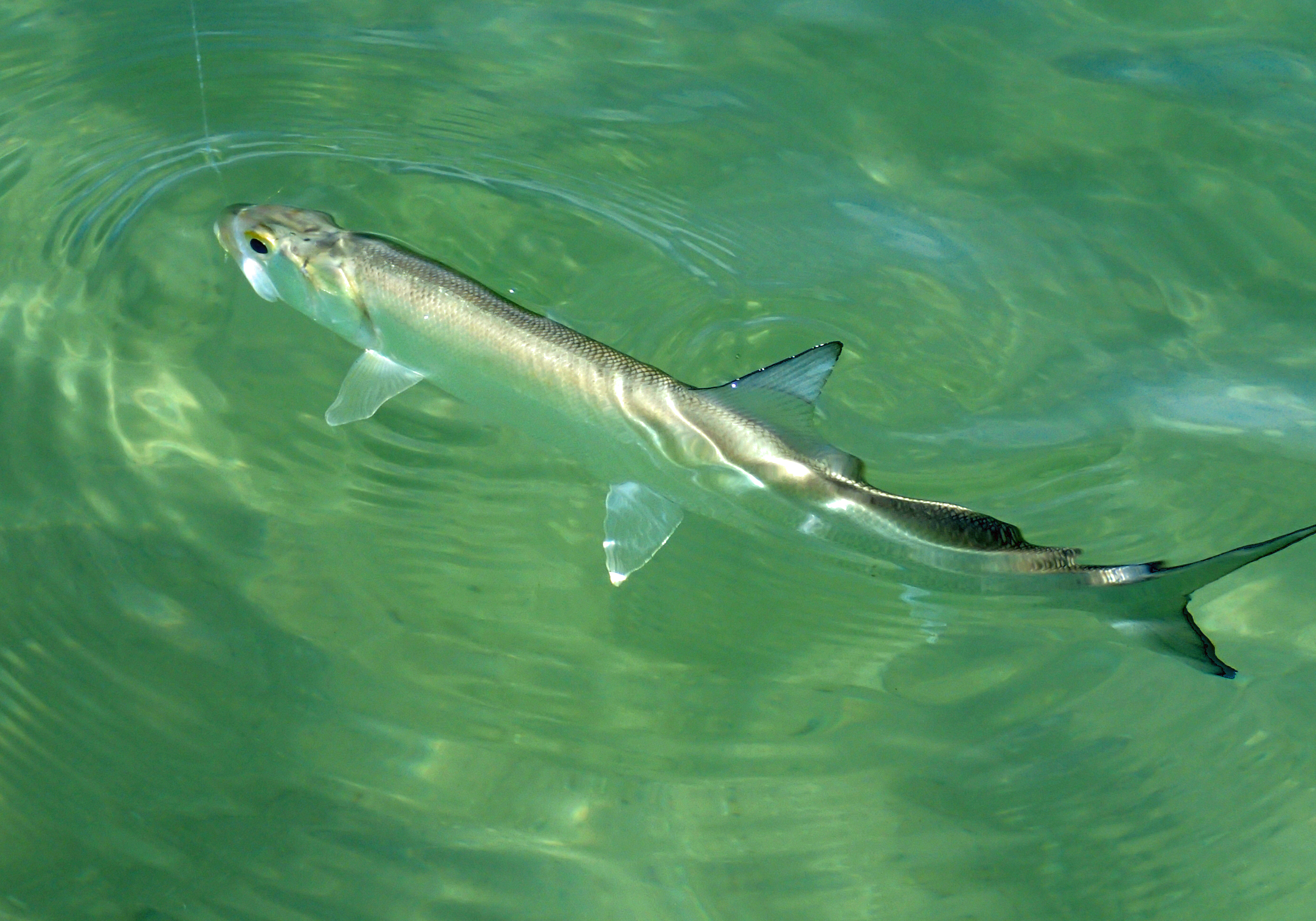
Ladyfish Elops saurus, Fort Desoto County Park, Tampa Bay, November 2016

Like other species in its genus, the ladyfish has a long, slender, rounded body covered with silvery scales. Its mouth is terminal and the tail is deeply forked. The species can be distinguished by counting the number of gill rakers and vertebrae.

== Distribution ==
The ladyfish is distributed in the western North Atlantic Ocean from New England to Florida, and the Gulf of Mexico. Its distribution overlaps with the malacho (Elops smithi) in the southeast US and the southern Gulf of Mexico.

== Biology ==
Like other members of the Elopidae, the ladyfish is a pelagic fish that spawns in the sea, but little is known about this marine phase. The larvae, which are transparent and laterally compressed, are dispersed inshore and enter embayments, where they live for 2 to 3 yr. The juveniles are euryhaline, or tolerant to a wide range of salinity, so these embayments may be low-salinity estuaries or hypersaline lagoons. Subadults move into the lower reaches of the embayments, and upon maturation, proceed to offshore, marine habitats.

== Threats ==
This species uses estuarine areas and hypersaline lagoons; changes in the quality of these habitats may affect this species' population dynamics. Although this species may not be closely associated with any single habitat, it may be adversely affected by development and urbanization.
