= Esocelops =

Esocelops Temporal range: Lower Eocene

Scientific classification
- Kingdom: Animalia
- Phylum: Chordata
- Class: Actinopterygii
- Division: Teleostei
- Order: Elopiformes
- Family: Elopidae
- Genus: †Esocelops; Woodward, 1901
- Species: †E. cavifrons

Binomial name
- †Esocelops cavifrons Woodward, 1901 ex Agassiz, 1845

Extinct genus of fishes

Esocelops (portmanteau of Esox + Elops) is an extinct genus of prehistoric marine elopid ray-finned fish that lived during the Eocene. It contains a single species, E. cavifrons, known from the Early Eocene of England (London Clay).

It was initially named, but not described, by Agassiz (1845) as Eurygnathus cavifrons, with Eurygnathus later being found to be both preoccupied by a beetle and synonymous with Enchodus. Woodward (1901) officially described it in the genus Esocelops, retaining Agassiz's original species name.

== See also ==
- Prehistoric fish
- List of prehistoric bony fish
