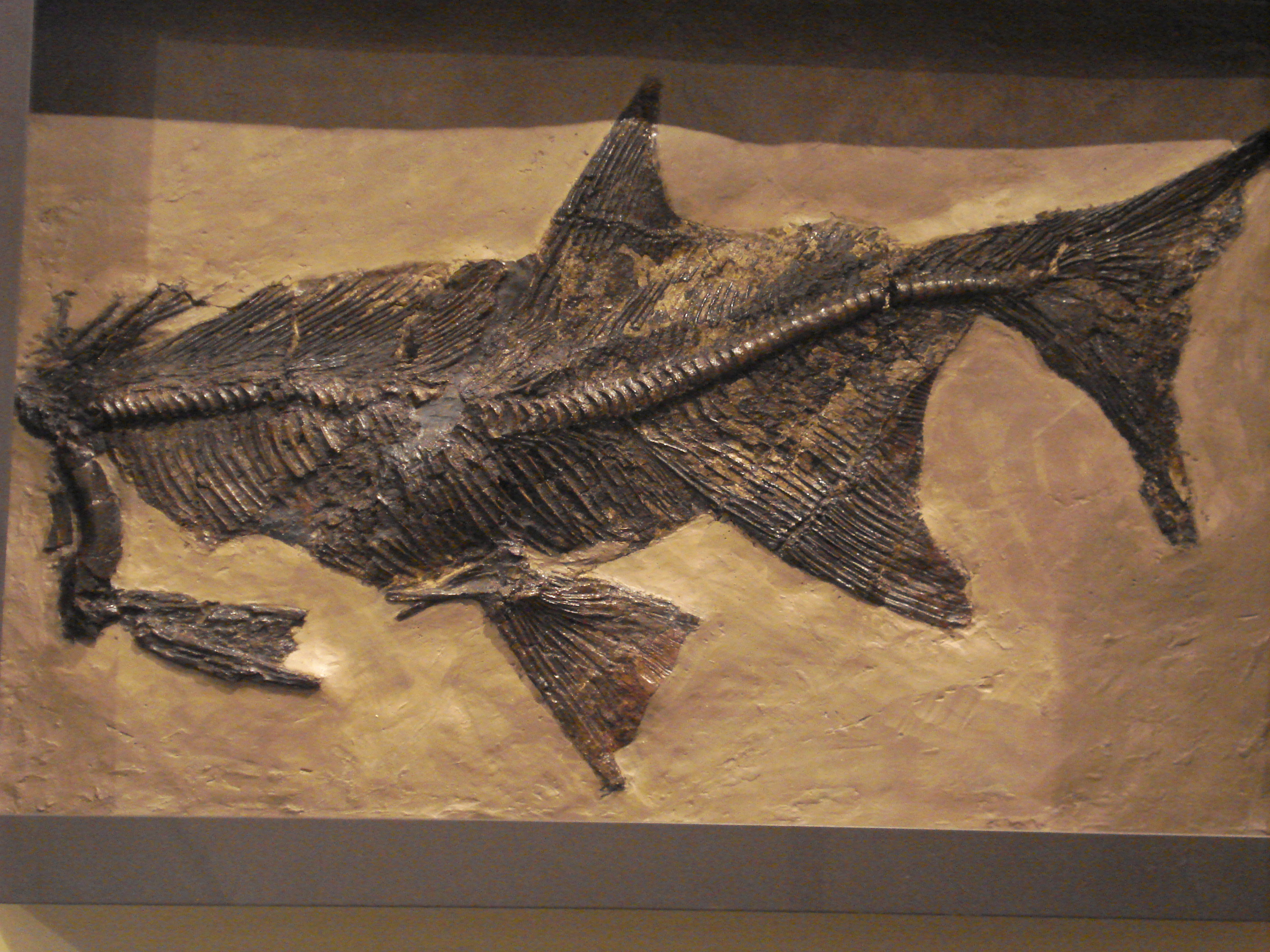
- Holotype skeleton

Scientific classification
- Domain: Eukaryota
- Kingdom: Animalia
- Phylum: Chordata
- Class: Actinopterygii
- Order: Elopiformes
- Family: Elopidae
- Genus: †Paratarpon

= Paratarpon =

Paratarpon Temporal range: Campanian

Extinct genus of fishes

Paratarpon is an extinct genus of prehistoric bony fish that lived during the Campanian.

== See also ==
- Prehistoric fish
- List of prehistoric bony fish
