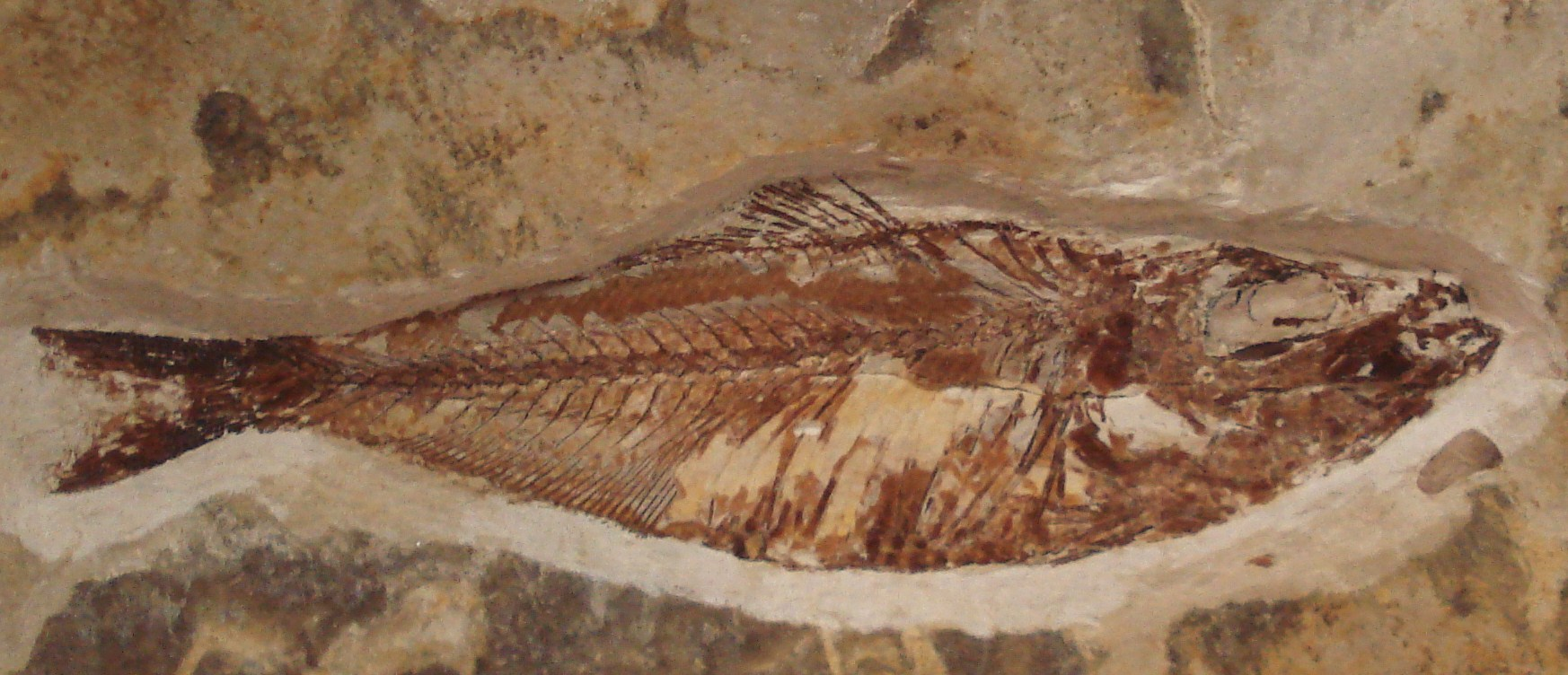
- Sedenhorstia dayi fossil

Scientific classification
- Domain: Eukaryota
- Kingdom: Animalia
- Phylum: Chordata
- Class: Actinopterygii
- Order: Elopiformes
- Genus: †Sedenhorstia; White & Moy-Thomas, 1941

= Sedenhorstia =

Sedenhorstia Temporal range: Cenomanian - Campanian

Extinct genus of fishes

Sedenhorstia is an extinct genus of prehistoric bony fish that lived from the Cenomanian to Campanian.

== See also ==
- Prehistoric fish
- List of prehistoric bony fish
