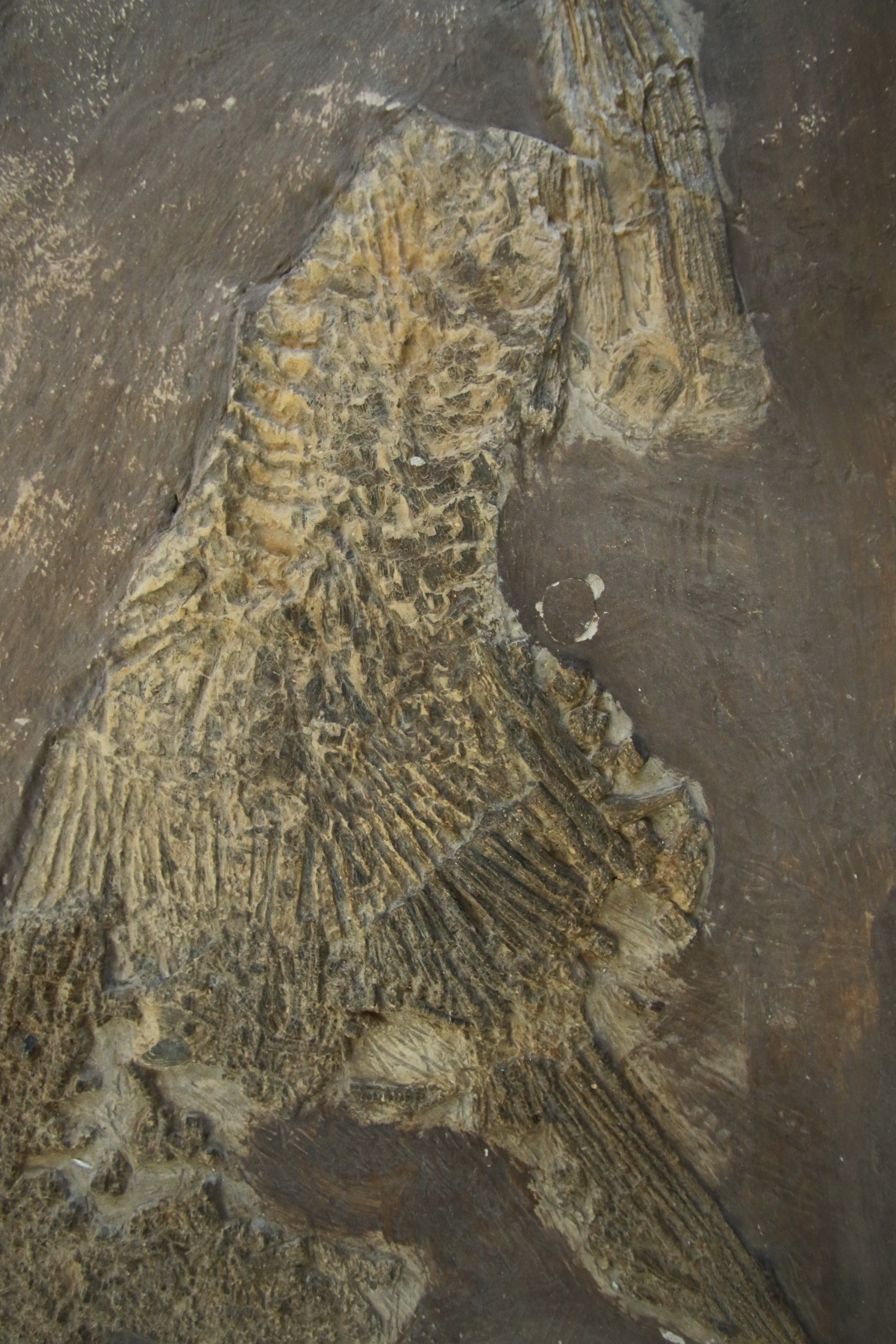

Scientific classification
- Domain: Eukaryota
- Kingdom: Animalia
- Phylum: Chordata
- Class: Actinopterygii
- Order: Elopiformes
- Genus: †Lyrolepis; Romanowski, 1886

= Lyrolepis =

Lyrolepis Temporal range: Bartonian-Early Oligocene ~38–30 Ma

Extinct genus of fishes

Lyrolepis is an extinct genus of prehistoric ray-finned fish found in the Eocene Adaev Formation of Kazakhstan and the Pshekha Formation of Georgia.

== See also ==
- Prehistoric fish
- List of prehistoric bony fish
