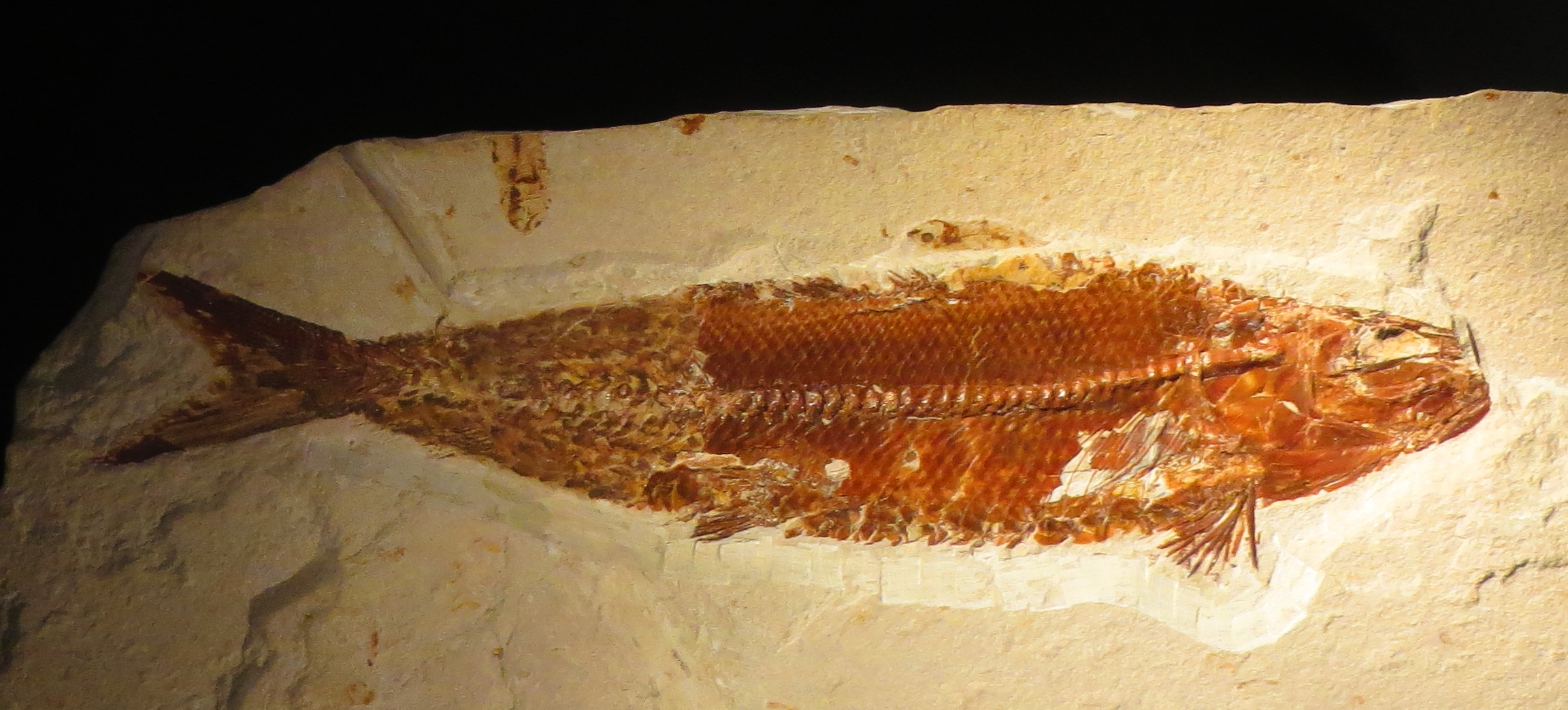
- Specimen of O. sardinoides

Scientific classification
- Kingdom: Animalia
- Phylum: Chordata
- Class: Actinopterygii
- Order: Elopiformes
- Genus: †Osmeroides; Agassiz, 1835

= Osmeroides =

Osmeroides Temporal range: Cenomanian

Extinct genus of fishes

Osmeroides is an extinct genus of prehistoric ray-finned fish from the Cretaceous.

== See also ==
- Prehistoric fish
- List of prehistoric bony fish
