= Protarpon =

Protarpon Temporal range: Lower Eocene

Scientific classification
- Domain: Eukaryota
- Kingdom: Animalia
- Phylum: Chordata
- Class: Actinopterygii
- Order: Elopiformes
- Genus: †Protarpon; Forey, 1973

Extinct genus of fishes

Protarpon is an extinct genus of prehistoric bony fish that lived during the lower Eocene.

== See also ==
- Prehistoric fish
- List of prehistoric bony fish
