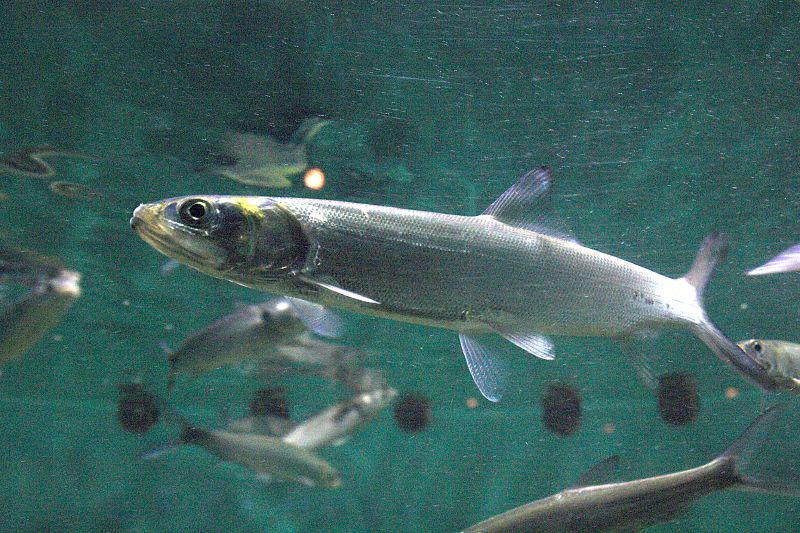
- Elops saurus
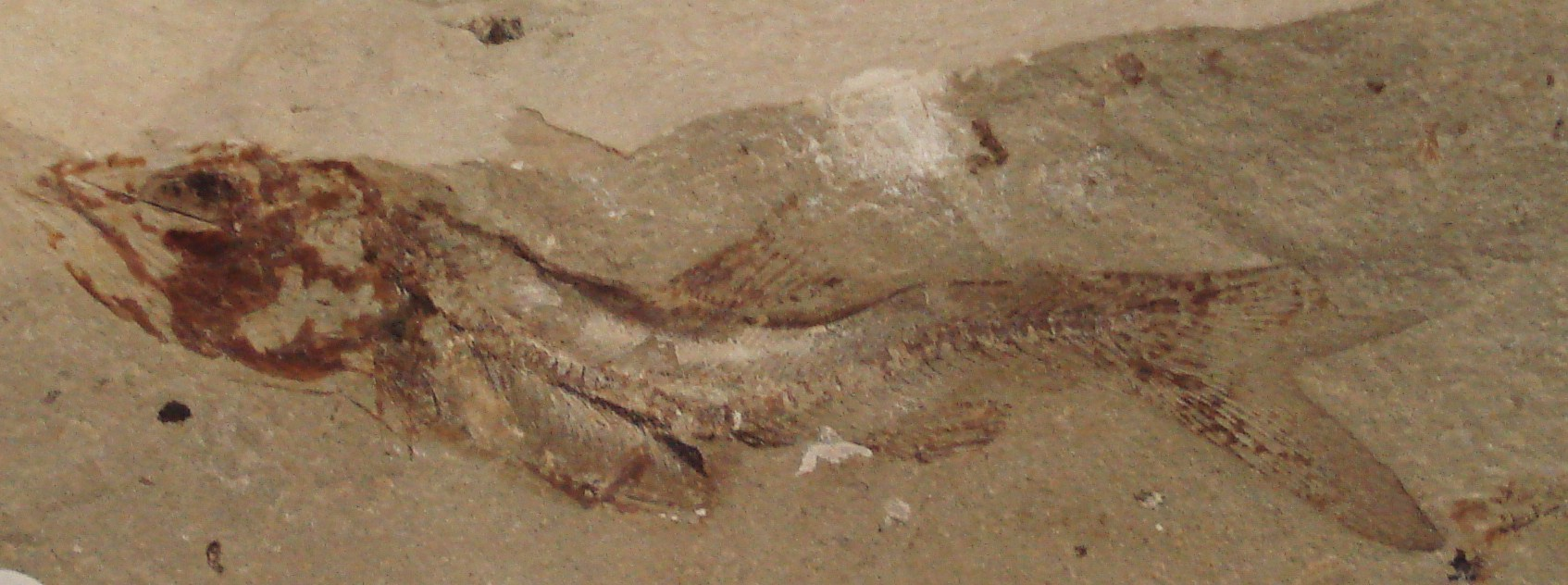
- Davichthys, a fossil elopid from the Late Cretaceous

Scientific classification
- Kingdom: Animalia
- Phylum: Chordata
- Class: Actinopterygii
- Order: Elopiformes
- Family: Elopidae; Bonaparte, 1832

Type species
- Elops saurus Linnaeus, 1766

Genera
- See text

Synonyms
- Elopina Günther 1868; Siagonotes Duméril 1805

= Elopidae =

Elopidae Temporal range: Late Jurassic to present

Genus of fishes

The Elopidae are an ancient family of ray-finned fish, one of two living members of the order Elopiformes. They containing a single living genus, Elops, and many extinct genera dating back to the Late Jurassic, when the earliest stem-group elopids are known. They appear to have diverged from their closest relatives, the Megalopidae, during the Jurassic.

== Etymology ==
The name comes from the Ancient Greek ἔλοψ (élops), variant of ἔλλοψ (éllops), referring to a kind of serpent or serpentlike sea fish. Compare the name of the unrelated family Elapidae.

== Taxonomy ==
The following genera are known:

- Elops Linnaeus 1766 non Bonaparte 1831 non Commerson ex Lacépède, 1801 - Early Cretaceous (Aptian) to present
- †Ctenodentelops Forey et al., 2003 - Late Cretaceous (Cenomanian) of Lebanon
- †Davichthys Forey 1973 - Late Cretaceous (Cenomanian to Santonian) of Europe and the Middle East
- †Elopsomolos Arratia, 2000 - Late Jurassic (Kimmeridgian) of Germany
- †Esocelops Woodward, 1901 - Early Eocene of England
- †Ichthyemidion Arratia, 1995 - Early Cretaceous of Spain
- †Italoelops Taverne & Capasso, 2024 - Early Cretaceous (Aptian) of Italy
- †Kipalelops Taverne, 1976 - Late Cretaceous of the Democratic Republic of the Congo
- †Landanaelops Taverne & Smith, 2026 - Middle Paleocene of Angola
- †Lyrolepis Romanowski 1886 non Rechiger, 1943 - Oligocene of North Caucasus, Russia
- †Nardoelops Taverne & Capasso, 2012 - Late Cretaceous (Campanian or Maastrichtian) of Italy
- ?†Opisthopteryx Pictet & Humbert, 1866 - Santonian of Lebanon
- ?†Palelops Applegate, 1970 - Late Cretaceous of Alabama, USA
- †Protelops Laube, 1885 - Cenomanian of England
- ?†Sauropsidium Costa, 1850 - Early Cretaceous of Italy
- ?†Thrissopteroides von der Marck, 1873 - Late Cretaceous of Germany and Lebanon

== See also ==
- Tarpon
