= Promegalops =

Promegalops Temporal range: Lower Eocene

Scientific classification
- Kingdom: Animalia
- Phylum: Chordata
- Class: Actinopterygii
- Division: Teleostei
- Order: Elopiformes
- Genus: †Promegalops; Casier, 1966

Extinct genus of fishes

Promegalops is an extinct genus of prehistoric bony fish that lived during the lower Eocene.

== See also ==
- Prehistoric fish
- List of prehistoric bony fish
