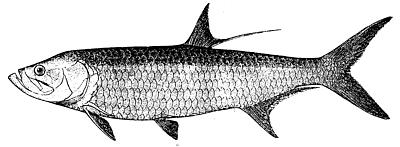
- Tarpon, Megalops sp.

Scientific classification
- Kingdom: Animalia
- Phylum: Chordata
- Class: Actinopterygii
- Superorder: Elopomorpha
- Order: Elopiformes; P. H. Greenwood, D. E. Rosen, S. H. Weitzman, and G. S. Meyers, 1966

Type species
- Elops saurus Linnaeus, 1766

Families
- Elopidae; Megalopidae

Synonyms
- Elopoidei sensu de Figueiredo et al. 2012; Megalopiformes

= Elopiformes =

Elopiformes Temporal range: Middle Jurassic–recent

Order of fishes

The Elopiformes /ˈɛləpɪfɔːrmiːz/ are the order of ray-finned fish including the tarpons, tenpounders, and ladyfish, as well as a number of extinct types. They have a long fossil record, easily distinguished from other fishes by the presence of an additional set of bones in the throat.

They are related to the order of eels, although the adults superficially resemble very large or giant herrings in appearance. The larvae, however, are leptocephalic, looking very similar to those of eels.

== Classification ==
Although many fossil forms are known, the order is relatively small today, containing just two genera and nine species:

- Order Elopiformes Gosline 1960
  - Genus ?†Dinelops Woodward, 1907
  - Family †Anaethaliidae Gaudant 1968 [Anaethalionidae Gaudant 1967]
    - Genus †Daitingichthys Arratia 1987
    - Genus †Anaethalion White 1938 [Aethalion von Münster 1842 non Lepeletier & Serville 1828]
    - Genus †Holcolepis von der Marck 1868 [Macrolepis von der Marck 1863 non Rafinesque 1815; Rhabdolepis von der Marck 1863 non Troschel 1857; Petalolepis Geints 1868]
  - Suborder Elopoidei
    - Genus †Antofagastaichthys Arratia 1986
    - Genus †Arratiaelops Taverne 1999
    - Genus †Coryphaenopsis Frič & Bayer 1902
    - Genus †Ctenodentelops Forey et al. 2003
    - Genus †Echinelops Murray & Hoşgör 2012
    - Genus †Ectasis Jordan & Gilbert 1919
    - Genus †Elopidarum
    - Genus †Elopsomolos Arratia 2000
    - Genus †Eurygnathus Agassiz 1845 non Blackburn 1888 non Davis 1887 non Wollaston 1854 [Esocelops Woodward 1901]
    - Genus †Goulmimichthys Cavin 1995
    - Genus †Hypsospondylus Gorjanovic-Kramberger 1885
    - Genus †Irenichthys Jakovlev 1968
    - Genus †Laminospondylus Springer 1957
    - Genus †Tingitanichthys Taverne 1996
    - Genus †Paraelops Silva Santos 1971
    - Genus †Ichthyemidion Poyato-Ariza 1995
    - Family †Protelopidae de Saint Seine 1949
      - Genus †Eoprotelops Saint-Seine 1949
      - Genus †Protelops Laube 1885
    - Family Elopidae Bonaparte 1832/Valenciennes 1847 (ladyfish, tenpounders)
      - Genus †Flindersichthys Longman 1932
      - Genus †Histialosa Gervais 1855
      - Genus †Lyrolepis Romanowski 1886 non Rechiger 1943
      - Genus †Nardoelops Taverne & Capasso 2012
      - Genus †Opisthopteryx Pictet & Humbert 1866
      - Genus †Palelops Applegate 1970
      - Genus †Parasyllaemus
      - Genus †Sauropsidium Costa 1850 [Hyptius Costa 1864]
      - Genus †Thrissopteroides von der Marck 1873
      - Genus †Davichthys Forey 1973
      - Genus †Naiathaelon Poyato-Ariza & Wenz 1994
      - Genus Elops Linnaeus 1766 non Bonaparte 1831 non Commerson ex Lacépède 1801 [Helops Müller 1835 non Brandt & Ratzeburg 1833 non Agassiz 1846 non Browne 1789; Ellops Minding 1832 non Gistel 1848; Alloelops (Nybelin 1979); Elops (Alloelops) Nybelin 1979; Elops (Gularus) Whitley 1940; Gularus (Whitley 1940); Mugilomorus Lacépède 1803; Trichonotus Rafinesque 1815 non Bloch & S Schneider 1801; Harengus Catesby 1771 non Geoffroy 1767 non Klein 1775 ex Walbaum 1792 non De Garsault 1764] (seven species, one of which was described in 2010)
    - Family Megalopidae Jordan 1882 (Tarpons)
      - Genus †Broweria de Beaufort, 1926
      - Genus †Elopoides Wenz 1965
      - Genus †Paratarpon Bardack 1970
      - Genus †Promegalops Casier 1966
      - Genus †Protarpon Forey 1973
      - Genus †Sedenhorstia White & MoyThomas 1941 [Microcoelia Marck 1863 non Guenee 1852 non Lindley 1830 non Agardh 1876]
      - Genus †Starrias Jordan 1925
      - Genus Megalops Lacépède 1803 [Amia Browne 1756 ex Browne 1789 non Gronow 1763 ex Gray 1854 non Meuschen 1781 non Linnaeus 1766; Brisbania de Castelnau 1878; Cyprinodon Hamilton 1822 non Lacépède 1803; Oculeus Commerson ex Lacépède 1803; Tarpon Jordan & Evermann 1896] (two species)
