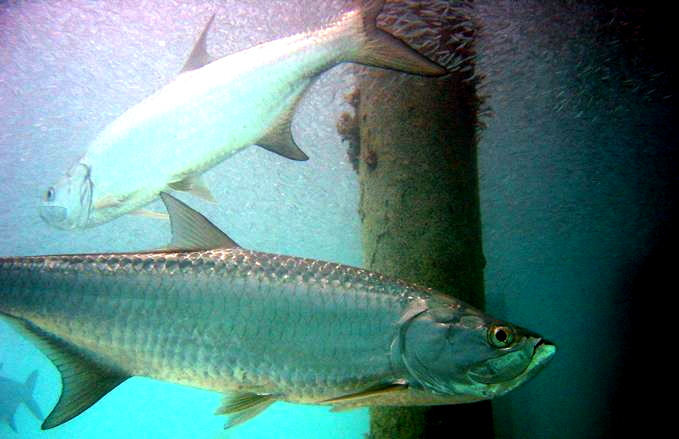
- Atlantic tarpon

Scientific classification
- Kingdom: Animalia
- Phylum: Chordata
- Class: Actinopterygii
- Division: Teleostei
- Order: Elopiformes
- Family: Megalopidae
- Genus: Megalops; Valenciennes, 1847

Species
- M. atlanticus Valenciennes, 1847; M. cyprinoides (Broussonet, 1782)

Synonyms
- Amia Browne 1756 ex Browne 1789 non Gronow 1763 ex Gray 1854 non Meuschen 1781 non Linnaeus 1766; Brisbania de Castelnau 1878; Cyprinodon Hamilton 1822 non Lacépède 1803; Oculeus Commerson ex Lacépède 1803; Tarpon Jordan & Evermann 1896

= Tarpon =

Tarpon Temporal range: Late Oligocene–present Possible Cretaceous records

Family of fishes (Megalopidae)

Tarpon are fish of the genus Megalops. They are the only extant members of the family Megalopidae. Of the two species, one (M. atlanticus) is native to the Atlantic, and the other (M. cyprinoides) to the Indo-Pacific Oceans.

== Species and habitats ==
The two species of tarpon are M. atlanticus (Atlantic tarpon) and M. cyprinoides (Indo-Pacific tarpon):

- M. atlanticus is found on the western Atlantic coast from Virginia to Brazil, throughout the Caribbean and the coast of the Gulf of Mexico. Tarpon are also found along the eastern Atlantic coast from Senegal to South Angola.
- M. cyprinoides is found along the eastern African coast, throughout Southeast Asia, Japan, Tahiti and Australia.

Both species are found in marine and freshwater habitats, usually ascending rivers to access freshwater marshes. They are able to survive in brackish water, waters of varying pH and habitats with low dissolved O_{2} content due to their swim bladders, which they use primarily to breathe. They can also rise to the surface and take gulps of air, giving them a short burst of energy. The habitats of tarpon vary greatly with their developmental stages. Stage-one larvae are usually found in clear, warm, oceanic waters, relatively close to the surface. Stage-two and -three larvae are found in salt marshes, tidal pools, creeks and rivers. Their habitats are characteristically warm, shallow, dark bodies of water with sandy mud bottoms. Tarpon commonly ascend rivers into fresh water. As they progress from the juvenile stage to adulthood, they often return to the ocean's open waters, though many remain in freshwater habitats.

=== Fossil species ===
Fossils of this genus go back to the Late Oligocene of Australia, and potentially the Late Cretaceous of Mississippi, US. Potential fossil remains are known from the Early Cretaceous (Albian) of Mexico, though these may just be indeterminate megalopids.

- †M. lissa Stinton, 1957 - Late Oligocene to Middle Miocene of Australia. Known only from fossil otoliths.
- †?M. nolfi Schwarzhans & Stringer, 2020 - Late Cretaceous (Campanian) of Mississippi, US. Known only from fossil otoliths.
- †M. vigilax (Jordan, 1927): A fossil species from California dating to the Miocene.

Other former fossil species from the Eocene are now placed in the fossil genera Promegalops and Protarpon.

== Physical characteristics ==
Tarpon grow to about 4–8 ft (1.2–2.4 m) long and weigh 60–280 lb (27–127 kg). They have dorsal and anal soft rays and bluish or greenish backs. Tarpons possess shiny, silvery scales that cover most of their bodies, excluding the head. They have large eyes with adipose eyelids and broad mouths with prominent lower jaws that jut out farther than the rest of the face.

=== Reproduction and lifecycle ===
Tarpon breed offshore in warm, isolated areas. Females have high fecundity and can lay up to 12 million eggs at once. They reach sexual maturity once they are about 75–125 cm (30–50 in) in length. Spawning usually occurs in late spring to early summer. Their three distinct levels of development usually occur in varying habitats. Stage one, or the leptocephalus stage, is completed after 20–30 days. It occurs in clear, warm oceanic waters, usually within 10–20 m (33–66 ft) of the surface. The leptocephalus shrinks as it develops into a larva; the most shrunken larva, stage two, develops by day 70. This is due to a negative growth phase followed by a sluggish growth phase. By day 70, the juvenile growth phase (stage three) begins, and the fish grows rapidly until sexual maturity.

=== Diet ===
Stage-one developing tarpon do not forage for food but instead absorb nutrients from seawater using integumentary absorption. Stage-two and -three juveniles feed primarily on zooplankton, insects and small fish. As they progress in juvenile development, especially those developing in freshwater environments, their consumption of insects, fish, crabs and grass shrimp increases. Adults are strictly carnivorous and feed on midwater prey; they hunt nocturnally and swallow their food whole.

=== Predation ===
The main predators of Megalops during stage-one and early stage-two development are other fish, depending on their size. Juveniles are subject to predation by other juvenile Megalops and piscivorous birds. They are especially vulnerable to birds such as ospreys or other raptors when they come to the surface for air due to the rolling manner in which they move to take in air, as well as the silver scales lining their sides. Adults occasionally fall prey to sharks, porpoises, crocodiles, and alligators.

=== Swim bladder ===
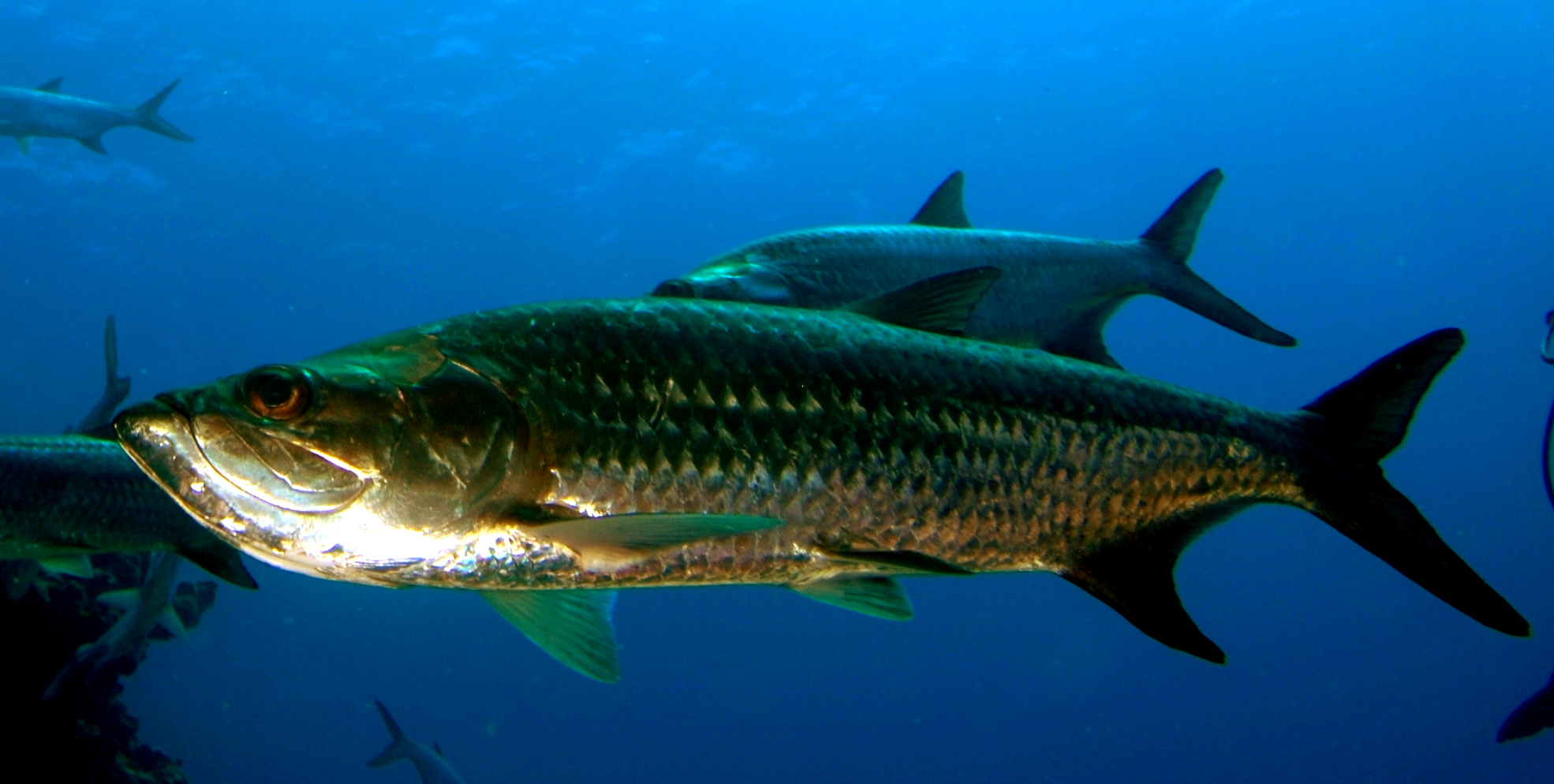
Tarpon swimming

The swim bladder of Megalops can be used as an accessory respiratory organ, in addition to controlling the buoyancy. It arises dorsally from the posterior pharynx, and the respiratory surface is coated with blood capillaries with a thin epithelium over the top. This is the basis of the alveolar tissue found in the swim bladder and allows Megalops to breathe air. This trait is essential due to the mangrove and marsh ecosystems the fish use as nursery habitats, which often have stagnant waters low in oxygen. The young fish will also ride the water into remote semi-landlocked ponds during storms and king tides, where they will stay from one to three years. These ponds, some of which are brackish or freshwater, often become so low in oxygen that tarpons and snooks are the only fish able to survive in these environments. The juveniles therefore face fewer competitors and predators, but need to breathe atmospheric oxygen to survive. The ability to breathe air is retained in the adults. Even if they live in more oxygenated marine coastal habitats, they have high rates of aerobic metabolism and also occasionally occur in hypoxic waters. These fish are obligate air breathers and will die without sufficient access to the surface. Gas exchange occurs at the surface through a rolling motion commonly associated with tarpon sightings. This breathing is believed to be mediated by visual cues, and the frequency of breathing is inversely correlated to the dissolved O_{2} content of the water in which they live.

== Megalops and humans ==
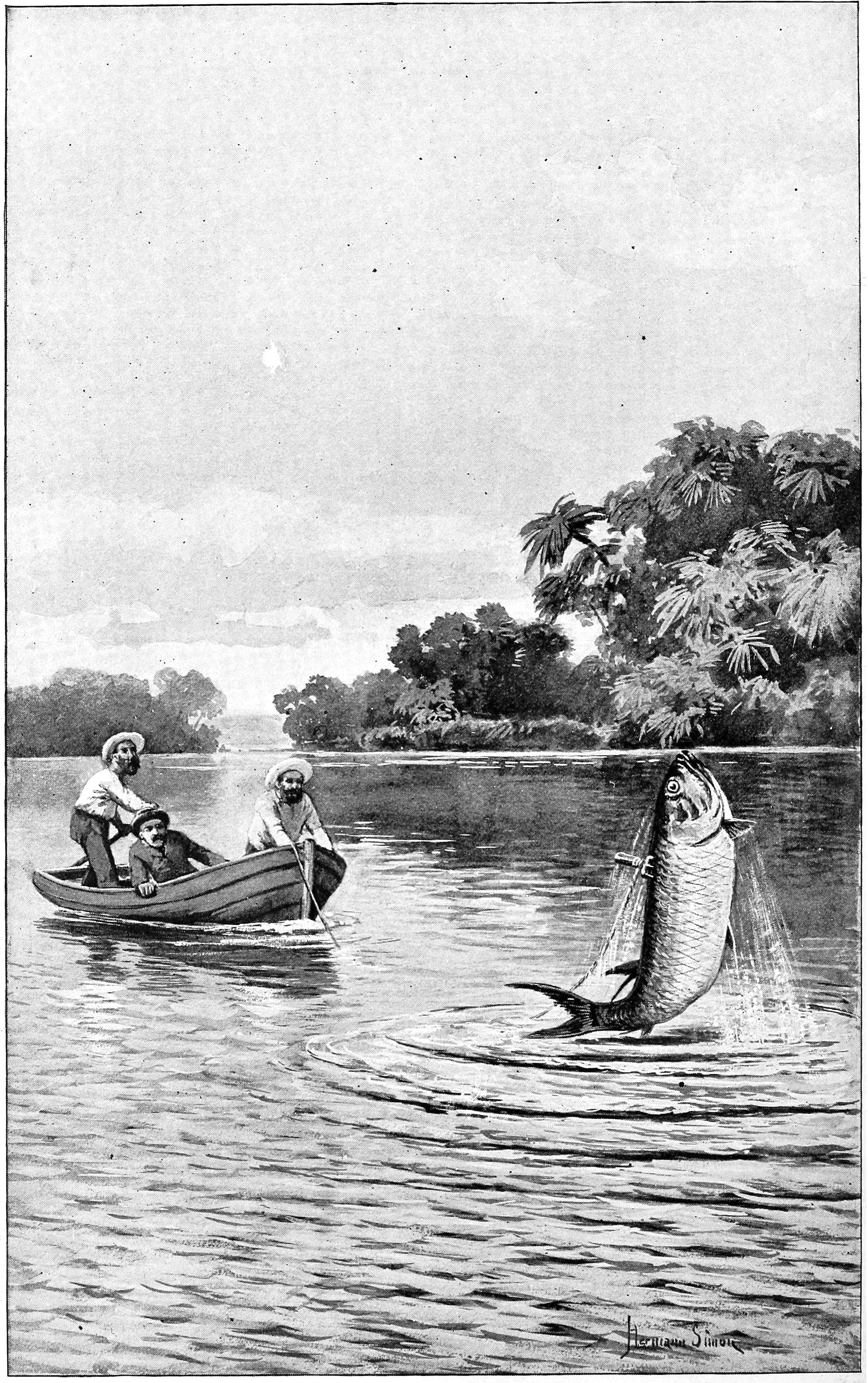
A speared tarpon leaps from the water in an 1894 illustration by Hermann Simon.

Tarpon are considered some of the greatest saltwater game fishes, prized not only because of their great size but also because of their fight and spectacular leaping ability. After the International Game Fish Association took responsibility for fly fishing records in salt water (1978), fly fishing for tarpon became increasingly popular, despite declining populations (correlated with the decline of freshwater rivers flowing into the seas around Florida.) Tarpon meat is not desirable, so most are released after being caught. Numerous tournaments are focused on catching tarpon.

The Atlantic tarpon adapts well to water bodies in urban and suburban environments due to their tolerance for boat traffic and low water quality. Around humans, Atlantic tarpon are primarily nocturnal.

== Geographical distribution and migration ==
Since tarpon are not commercially valuable as a food fish, very little has been documented concerning their geographical distribution and migrations. They inhabit both sides of the Atlantic Ocean, and their range in the eastern Atlantic has been reliably established from Senegal to the Congo. Tarpon inhabiting the western Atlantic are principally found to populate warmer coastal waters, primarily in the Caribbean, Gulf of Mexico, Florida, and the West Indies. Nonetheless, tarpon are regularly caught by anglers at Cape Hatteras and as far north as Nova Scotia, Bermuda, and south to Argentina. Scientific studies indicate that schools of tarpon have routinely migrated through the Panama Canal from the Atlantic to the Pacific and back for over 70 years. However, they have not been found to breed in the Pacific Ocean. Nevertheless, anecdotal evidence from tarpon fishing guides and anglers would tend to validate this notion, as over the last 60 years, many small juvenile tarpon as well as mature giants have been caught and documented principally on the Pacific side of Panama at the Bayano River, the Gulf of San Miguel and its tributaries, Coiba Island in the Gulf of Chiriquí, and Piñas Bay in the Gulf of Panama. In 2024, the tarpon has been recorded in northern Peru.

Since tarpon tolerate wide ranges of salinity throughout their lives and eat almost anything dead or alive, their migrations seemingly are only limited by water temperatures. Tarpon prefer water temperatures of 72 to 82 °F (22 to 28 °C); below 60 °F (16 °C) they become inactive, and temperatures under 40 °F (4 °C) can be lethal.

== See also ==
- Nelma, the "Tarpon of the Tundra"
